= McEwens =

British department store

Coordinates: 56.3952442°N 3.42742°W

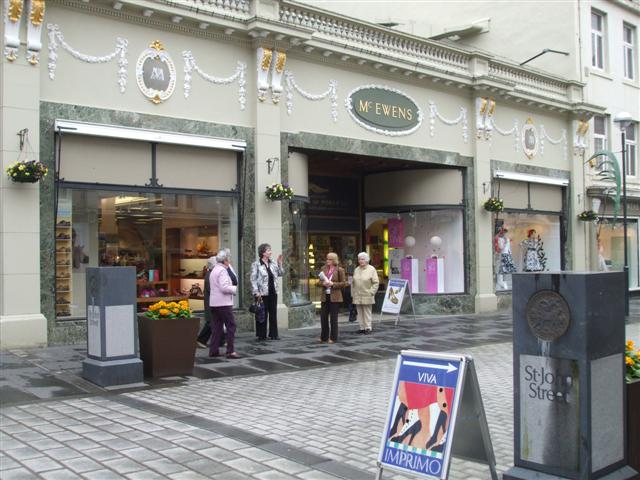
- McEwens in 2008
- Type: Private company
- Industry: Retail
- Genre: Department store
- Founded: 1868 (158 years ago)
- Founder: James McEwen
- Defunct: 2016 (10 years ago)
- Headquarters: 56 St John Street; Perth, Scotland
- Products: Homeware

McEwens (originally known as James McEwen & Co.) was a department store located in the Scottish city of Perth. Specialising in homeware, it was established in March 1868, and was in business for nearly 150 years. It closed in March 2016, along with its branches in Oban and Ballater, with the loss of over 100 jobs. Its store location, at 56 St John Street, was taken over in 2017 by Beales, an English department-store chain, but that has also since closed.

McEwens had a second location in Perth, at 29–37 South Street, a short distance from the St John's Street location.

The store's outbuildings, on Perth's Watergate, were proposed for demolition in 2019, to be replaced by housing.

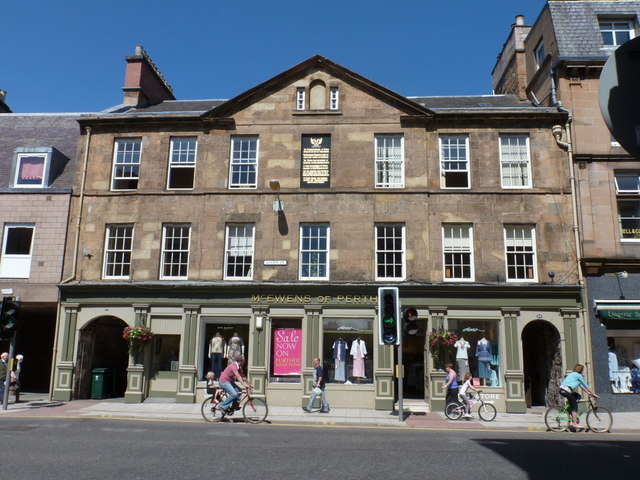
The South Street location, pictured in 2011
