= Vennels of Perth =

Small streets and footpaths in Perth, Scotland

Coordinates: 56.396545°N 3.430360°W

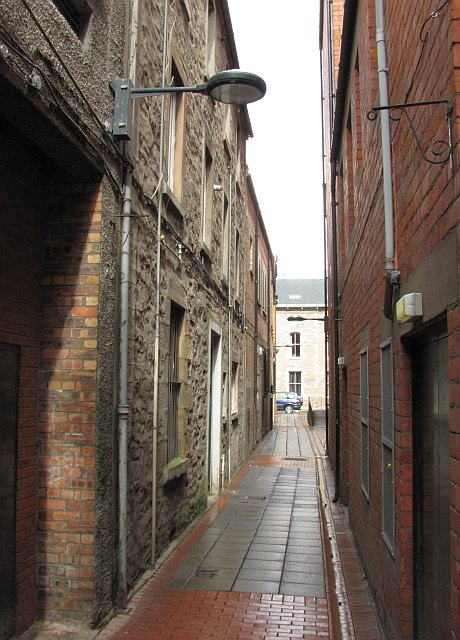
- Cutlog Vennel, which is about 300 feet (91 m) long, is one of several vennels connecting Mill Street and High Street
- Interactive map of Vennels of Perth
- Location: Perth, Perth and Kinross, Scotland

The vennels of Perth are a collection of small medieval streets in the city of Perth, Scotland. Similar to York's Snickelways, vennels are a public right-of-way passageway between the gables of buildings which can, in effect, be a minor street. In Scotland, the term originated in royal burghs created in the twelfth century, the word deriving from the Old French word venelle meaning "alley" or "lane". Unlike a tenement entry to private property, known as a "close", a vennel was a public way leading from a typical high street to the open ground beyond the burgage plots. The Latin form is venella, related to the English word "funnel".

Perth developed from an initial plan of two parallel streets — High Street and South Street — linked by several vennels leading north and south. The names of these vennels have historic origins, and many — such as Cow Vennel and Fleshers Vennel — reflect the trades associated with their foundation. South Street was originally terminated at its eastern end by Gowrie House (the site of today's Perth Sheriff Court). Upon its demolition in the early 19th century, direct access was granted to the river.

In 2018, Perth architect Fergus Purdie put forward a design to revamp a space off of Guard Vennel. If it were to be accepted, it would become a temporary events space. The plan was approved, on a city-wide scale, in March 2019.

== List of Perth's vennels ==
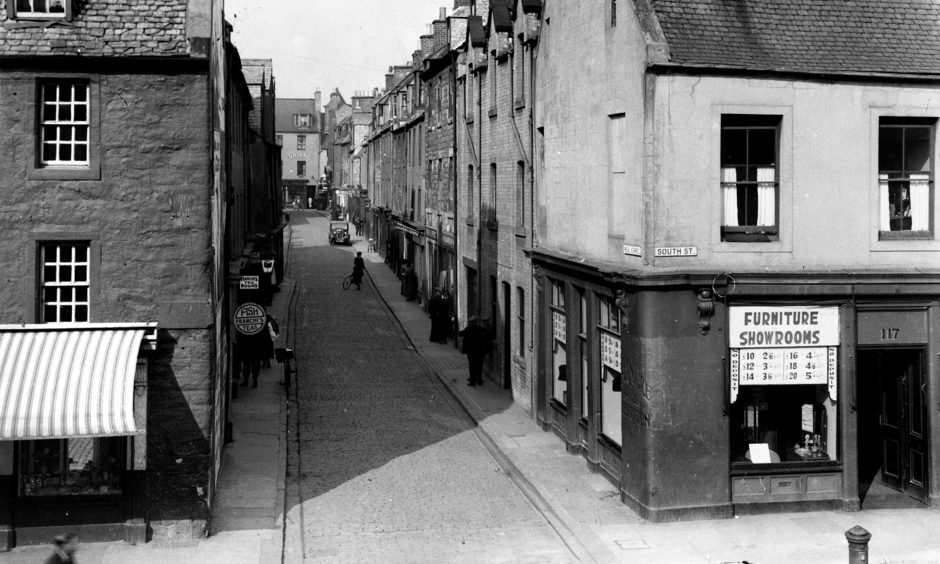
Meal Vennel in the 1950s, now the site of St John's Square

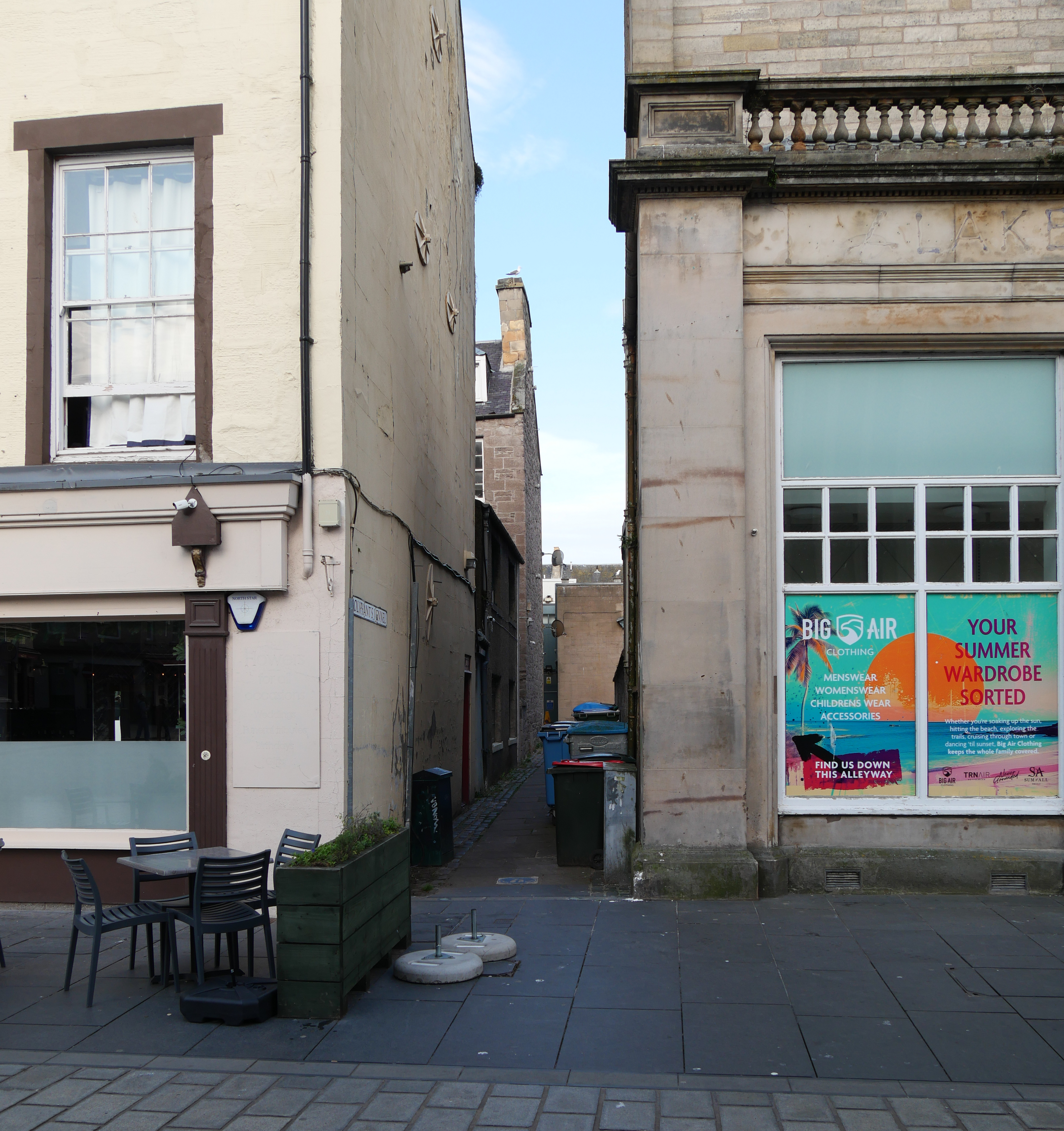
Oliphants Vennel, viewed from St John Street

Below is a list of Perth's vennels (and the streets they connect).

- Baxters Vennel (St John's Place to Watergate) – Baxter is the old Scots name for baker
- Burt's Close
- Cow Vennel (Mill Street to High Street) (Canal Street to South Street) – so named because it is where people would drive their cattle onto the South Inch for grazing
- Cutlog Vennel (Mill Street to 189 High Street)
- Fleshers' (or Flesh) Vennel (formerly Barbers Vennel) (St John's Place to 49 South Street; bounds St John's Kirk to the west)
- Guard Vennel (Mill Street to 105 High Street)
- Horners Lane (South Street to Canal Street)
- Meal Vennel (South Street to 164 High Street). Described in 1907 as "an old thoroughfare, presently the resort of curio dealers, and the happy hunting-ground of collectors". Several labourers lived on the street in 1911. It was also the home of the Central District School
- Oliphants Vennel (44 St John Street to Watergate)
- Ritten Row – one of the Kirk vennels
- Ropemakers Close (South Street to Canal Street)
- Salt Vennel – one of the Kirk vennels
- St Ann’s Lane (formerly School Vennel) (South Street to St John’s Place). From 1560, St Ann’s Lane (or School Vennel as it was known then) lead to the Perth Grammar School. The school was demolished in 1652 by Cromwell and rebuilt in 1773. It then transferred to Perth Academy on Rose Terrace in 1807. The buildings were converted into a theatre in 1810 but burned down in 1823. St Ann's Chapel was situated between the Grammar School and St John’s Kirk.
- Water Vennel (formerly South Boat Vennel) (Tay Street to 83 Watergate)
- Weaver Vennel (from and to South Street)
- North Boat Vennel (53 Watergate to Tay Street). Prior to the construction of Tay Street and Perth Bridge the Vennel was used as access to the river for boats to come and go from, typically ferries.

== See also ==
- Snickleway – Small streets and alleys in York, England

== Bibliography ==
- Perth: Street by Street: A Geographical and Historical Tour Around Perth's 600-plus Streets, Roads, and Vennels, Paul Philippou ISBN 0956337422
