= The Love of James the First, of Scotland =

Painting by John Everett Millais

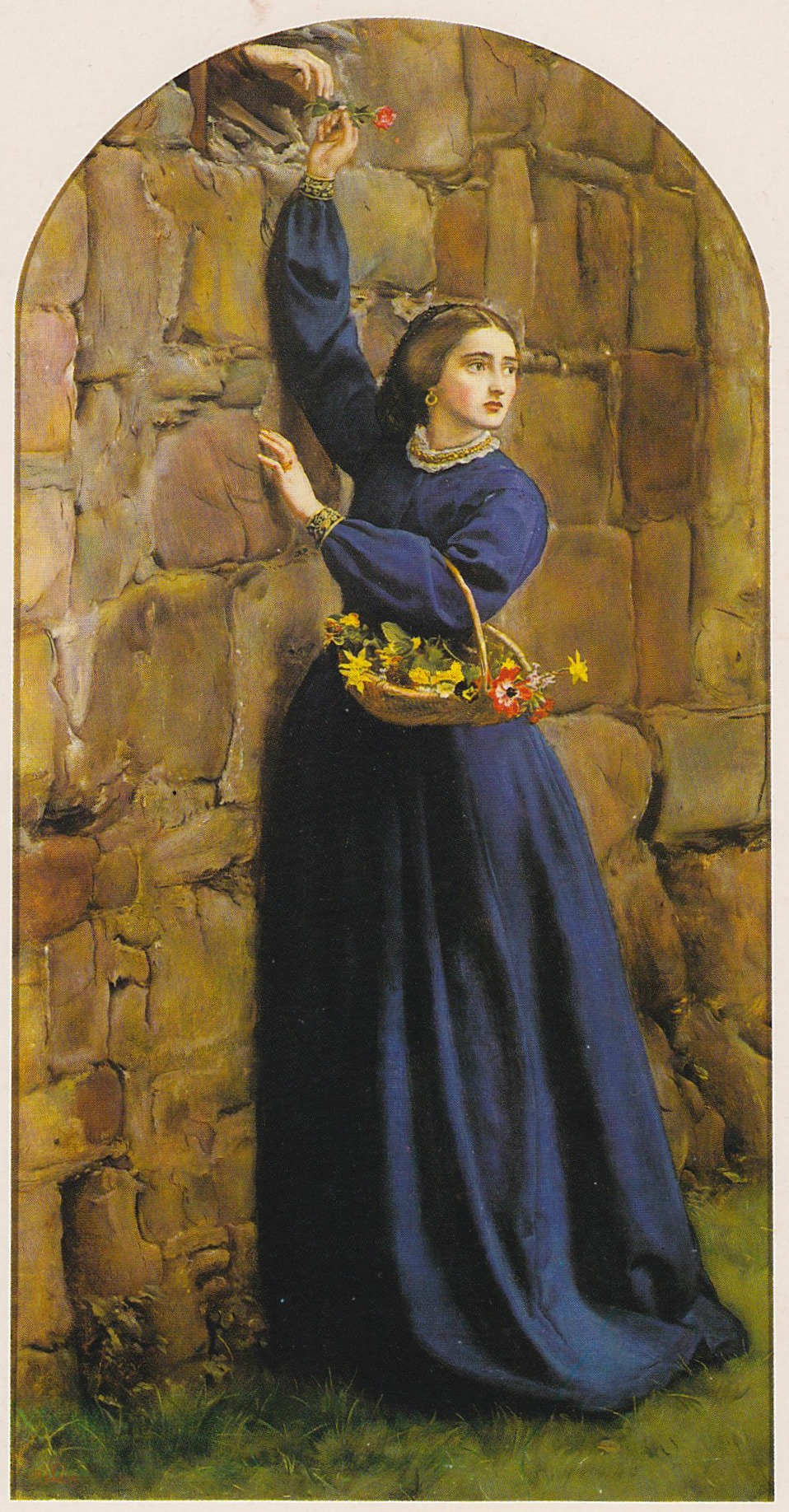
- Artist: John Everett Millais
- Year: 1858–59
- Type: oil on canvas
- Dimensions: 104.1 cm × 53.3 cm (41.0 in × 21.0 in)
- Location: Private collection

The Love of James the First, of Scotland (sometimes styled as The Love of James I of Scotland) is an 1858–59 oil painting by the English artist John Everett Millais. It shows a woman in a blue gown with a basket of flowers over one arm, reaching up to pass a flower to a hand reaching out from a piercing in the sturdy stone wall of a building.

== The painting ==
Millais based the painting on a historical event. King James I of Scotland (1394–1437) was held prisoner in Windsor Castle for some years. Legend had it that he fell in love with Lady Joan Beaufort, who used to walk in the castle garden below his window; his only means of communicating with her was by passing letters and objects through the bars of the grated window.

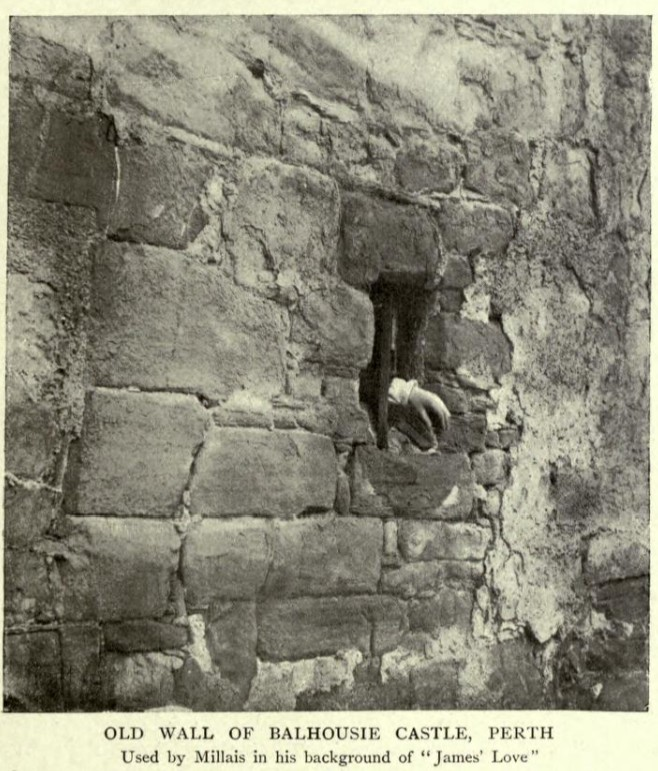
John Everett Millais. Reference photograph for The Love of James the First, of Scotland taken at Balhousie Castle, 1858 or earlier. Published in The Life and Letters of John Everett Millais by John Guille Millais, 1899, Volume 1, p. 361.

Millais painted the picture during 1858 and 1859 (signed with his monogram and dated 1859). A wall at "the picturesque old ruin" of Balhousie Castle was used for the wall in the painting. (Note: The wall probably no longer exists, as the original Balhousie Castle dating from 1631 was 'restored' (in fact, virtually rebuilt), and extensively remodelled on a larger scale between 1862 and 1864 in the Scottish Baronial style by the architect David Smart.) A reference photograph was taken, with the model's hand dropping a love-letter from the window. Millais' model for the painting was Miss Eyre, of Kingston, whose sister, Miss Mary Eyre, he also painted the following year as The Bride — a girl with passion flowers in her hair.

In 1859 the painting was exhibited at the Royal Academy Exhibition of 1859, catalogue number 482, alongside Millais' Spring (1856–59) and The Vale of Rest (1858–59).

It was also exhibited in a special Winter Exhibition at the Royal Academy, London, held between January and March 1898, which featured many collected works of the late Millais. It was hung under the title The Love of James I, of Scotland (1859), catalogue number 27. At this time it was owned by Charles Churchill, Esq. In his publication Millais and his Works, With Special Reference to Exhibition at the Royal Academy 1898, Marion Spielmann was not very enthusiastic about the painting:

The colour - the pure blue of the lady's dress the dominant note - is as strong, and the handling as incisive as ever; but the picture can hardly be considered among Millais's most successful efforts. In spite of passages of great beauty, the picture is not an attractive one.

Its present ownership and location is not in public record.

== See also ==
- List of paintings by John Everett Millais
