= Albert Lister Peace =

British organist

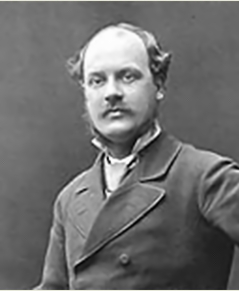
- Born: 26 January 1844; Huddersfield, England
- Died: 14 March 1912 (aged 68); Liverpool, England
- Occupations: classical organist, author, arranger, editor, composer
- Organizations: Glasgow Cathedral; St. George's Hall, Liverpool

Albert Lister Peace (26 January 1844 – 14 March 1912) was a British organist, arranger, composer, editor and author who first played the organ professionally at the age of nine. He went on to become the organist for Glasgow Cathedral (1879–1897), and St. George's Hall, Liverpool (1897–1912) (as successor to W. T. Best). He was also the University of Glasgow organist between 1870 and 1880.

WorldCat states he had 81 works in 109 publications.

== Early life ==
Peace was born on 26 January 1844 in Huddersfield, England. He learned to play the organ at an early age, becoming the organist of Holmfirth parish church at the age of nine.

== Career ==
Upon his appointment to Liverpool's St George's Hall, the Music Teachers National Association described Peace as "one of the finest interpreters of the organ classics that England has ever seen".

=== Kinnoull Parish Church ===
In April 1896, Peace was guest of honour at Kinnoull Parish Church for the unveiling of the congregation's new electric organ, the product of Hope–Jones Organ Company of Birkenhead. The organ cases were designed by local architect David Smart.

== Death ==
Peace died in 1912, aged 68, in Liverpool, England. He is buried in the graveyard of St Helens Church, Sefton, Merseyside.
