= James Smart (architect) =

Scottish architect (1847–1903)

- Born: 1847; Perth, Perthshire, Scotland
- Died: 22 February 1903 (aged 55)
- Occupation: Architect

James Smart (1847 – 22 February 1903) was a Scottish architect, prominent in the first half of the 19th century. He designed several notable buildings in Perthshire, several of which are now of listed status.

== Life and career ==
Smart was born in 1847 to James Smart and Ann Stewart. His father's brother was noted architect David Smart, whose career choice he opted to pursue. James had become a partner with his uncle in the firm D & J Stewart by 1887. The partnership had dissolved by 1895, possibly due to a family rift from the readmittance of James's son, John Walker Smart, to the practice. John was articled to his father in 1888, before gaining further experience with Edinburgh's Peddie & Kinnear four years later, followed by stints at McLuckie & Walker in Stirling and Dundee's Thomas Martin Cappon. He went on to work in Winnipeg, Canada.

David kept his office in Perth's Victoria Buildings at 42 Tay Street, with James opening his own business at 28 York Place, later becoming James Smart & Son.

== Death ==
Smart died on 22 February 1903, aged 55. He had been living at The Brae on Perth's Glasgow Road.

=== Selected notable works ===
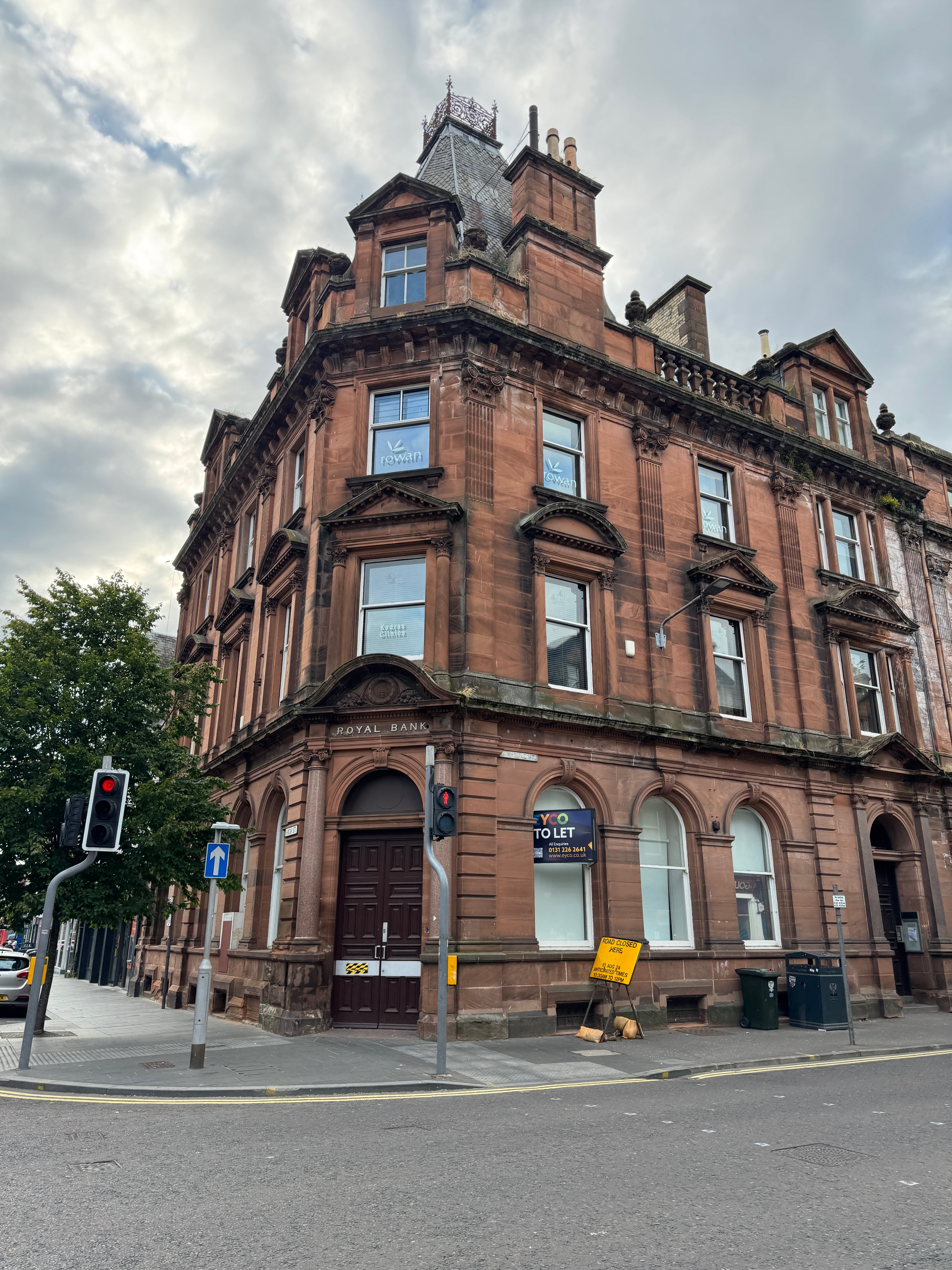
- Royal Bank of Scotland Buildings, 4 Kinnoull Street, Perth (2024)
  Blairgowrie Methodist Church (1887) – now Category B listed
- Union Street Public Hall, Coupar Angus (1887) – now Category C listed
- St Leonard's Church, Perth (1891; additions) – now Category B listed
- 6–12 Kinnoull Street, Perth (1895) – now Category C listed
- 33 St John Street, Perth (1898) – now Category B listed
- Royal Bank of Scotland Buildings, Perth (1899) – now Category B listed
