= Autumn Leaves (painting) =

Painting by John Everett Millais

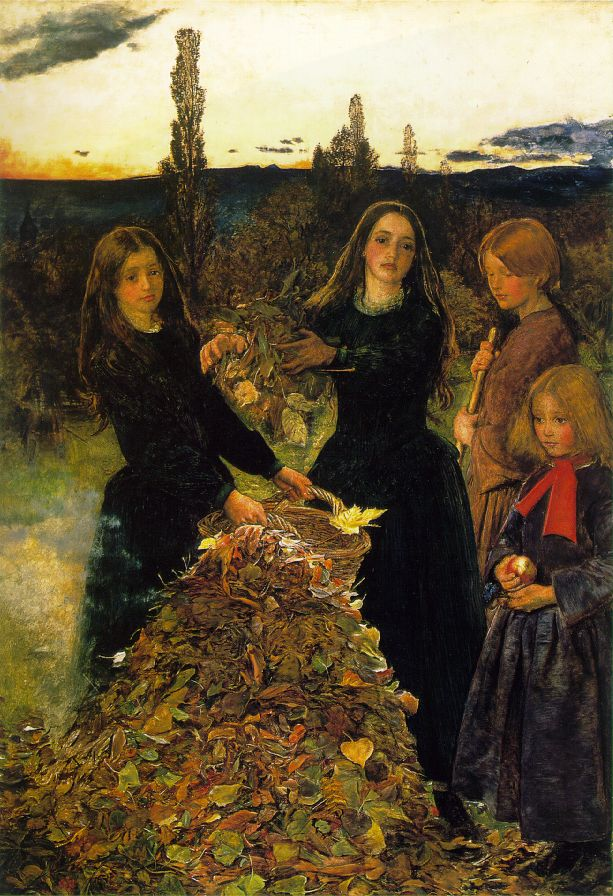
- Artist: John Everett Millais
- Year: 1855–56
- Medium: Oil on canvas
- Dimensions: 104 cm × 74 cm (41 in × 29 in)
- Location: Manchester City Art Gallery, Manchester

Autumn Leaves (1855–56) is a painting by John Everett Millais exhibited at the Royal Academy Exhibition of 1856. It was described by the critic John Ruskin as "the first instance of a perfectly painted twilight." Millais's wife Effie wrote that he had intended to create a picture that was "full of beauty and without a subject".

== The painting ==
The painting was begun in the autumn of 1855 and finished in April 1856. picture depicts four girls in the twilight collecting and raking together fallen leaves in a garden. The painting was done in the garden of Annat Lodge in Perth, Scotland, where the Millais family was living at the time, a location now occupied by Rodney Gardens. They are making a bonfire, but the fire itself is invisible, only smoke emerging from between the leaves. The two girls on the left, modelled on Millais's sisters-in-law Alice and Sophie Gray, are portrayed in middle-class clothing of the era; the two on the right are in rougher, working class clothing.

The painting has been seen as one of the earliest influences on the development of the aesthetic movement.

A sculpture in Rodney Gardens, known as "Millais Viewpoint", recreates the view through two lower corners of a picture frame, made of stone.

== Interpretations ==
The painting has typically been interpreted as a representation of the transience of youth and beauty, a common theme in Millais's art. Malcolm Warner argues that Millais was influenced by the poetry of Tennyson, at whose house he had once helped to rake together autumn leaves. Warner suggests that lines from Tennyson's song "Tears, Idle Tears" in The Princess (1847) may have influenced him:

Tears, idle tears, I know not what they mean.
Tears from the depth of some divine despair
Rise in the heart, and gather to the eyes,
In looking on the happy Autumn-fields,
And thinking on the days that are no more.

The apple held by the youngest girl at the right may allude to the loss of childhood innocence implied by reference to original sin and the expulsion from the Garden of Eden.

After a positive review from F.G. Stephens, Millais wrote to him that he had "intended the picture to awaken by its solemnity the deepest religious reflection. I chose the subject of burning leaves as most calculated to produce this feeling."

== Millais Viewpoint ==
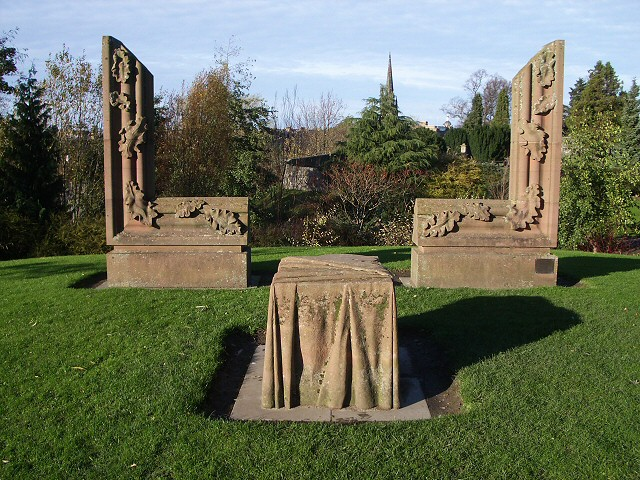
Millais Viewpoint sculpture, Rodney Gardens, Perth

== See also ==
- List of paintings by John Everett Millais
