= The Old Ship Inn =

Public house in Perth, Scotland

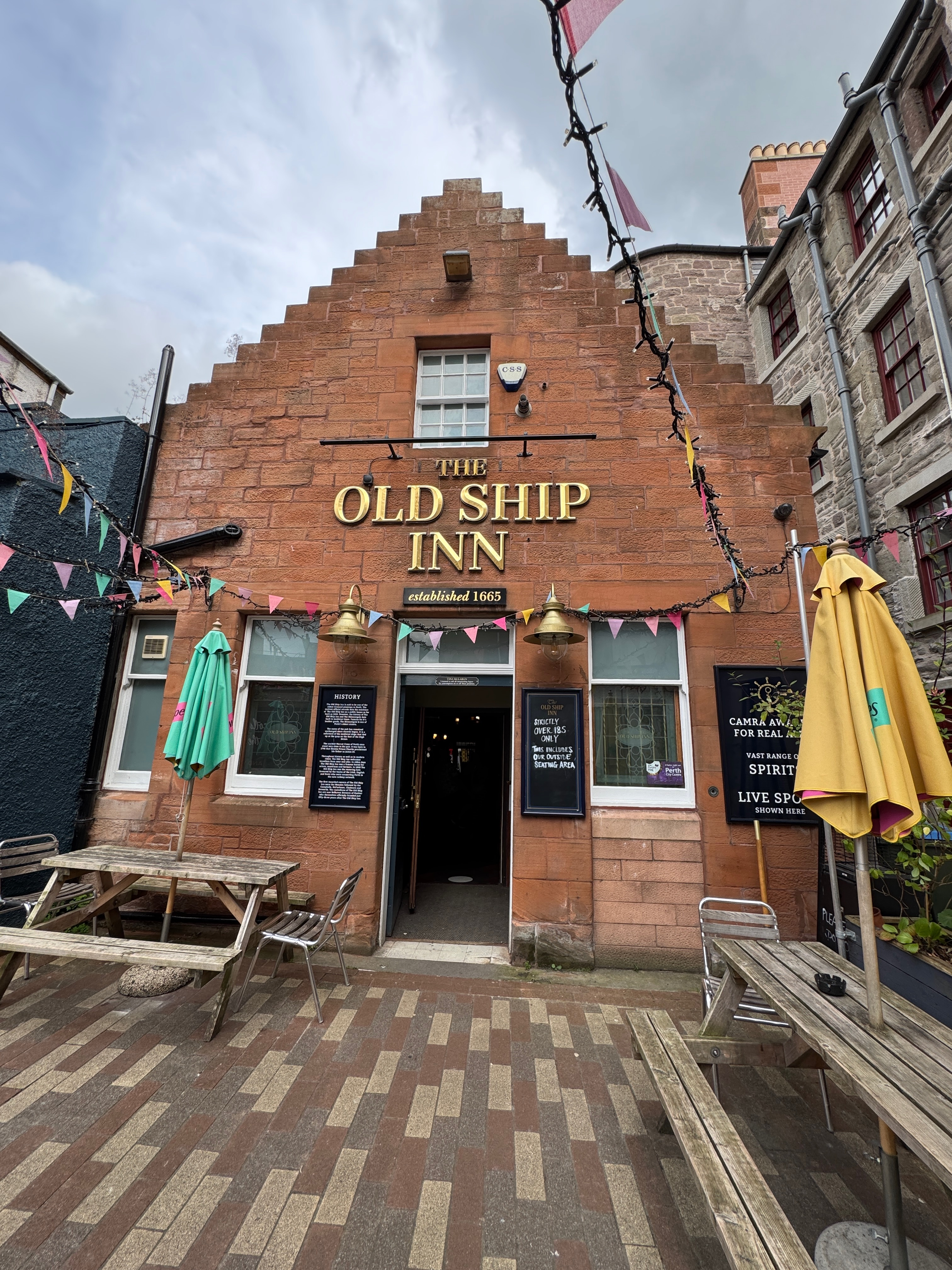
- The pub's Skinnergate entrance, pictured in 2024
- Interactive map of the The Old Ship Inn area

General information
- Type: Public house
- Location: 31 High Street, Perth; Perth and Kinross, Scotland
- Coordinates: 56°23′50″N 3°25′40″W
- Completed: late 19th century

Other information
- Public transit: Perth

Website
- oldshipinnperth.co.uk

The Old Ship Inn is a public house in Perth, Perth and Kinross, Scotland. While the current building is late Victorian, an Old Ship Inn has been on the site since at least 1665. Although its address is given as High Street, its entrance on the medieval Skinnergate is more notable. The inn's name references its proximity to Perth's original harbour, which lay at the end of the High Street.

The inn was close to the original Perth mercat cross, beside which Bonnie Prince Charlie proclaimed James III as his father. The mercat cross was moved when it was rebuilt.

The first recorded owners of the pub were the Menzies. They were followed by the Campbells, the McFarlanes, the Chalmers and the Stewarts.

The pub has been owned by Belhaven Brewery.
