= Queen's Bridge, Perth =

Bridge in Perth, Scotland

Queen's Bridge
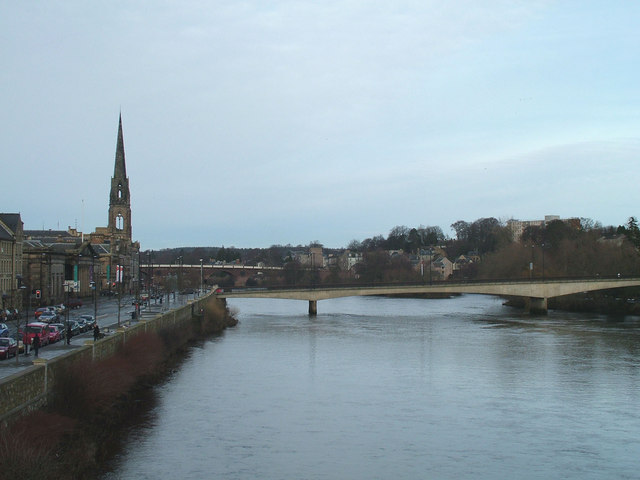
- The bridge in 2004, with Perth Bridge beyond it. Looking north from the Tay Viaduct
- Coordinates: 56°23′42″N 3°25′28″W
- Carries: South Street
- Crosses: River Tay
- Locale: Perth
- Maintained by: Perth and Kinross Council

Characteristics
- Total length: 246 feet (75 m)

History
- Opened: 10 October 1960 (65 years ago)

Location
- Interactive map of Queen's Bridge

Queen's Bridge is a toll-free bridge in the city of Perth, Scotland. It spans the River Tay. It carries both automotive and pedestrian traffic of South Street, one of Perth's three main streets from mediaeval times. It stands about 500 yards (460 m) downstream from Perth Bridge and is 246 feet (75 m) in length.

Queen's Bridge replaced Victoria Bridge, which stood between 1902 and 1958–1959, and was opened by Queen Elizabeth II on 10 October 1960. The pier on the bridge's eastern side is a remnant of the previous structure.

The construction of Victoria Bridge required the demolition of Rodney Lodge, which stood in today's Rodney Gardens.

== Construction ==
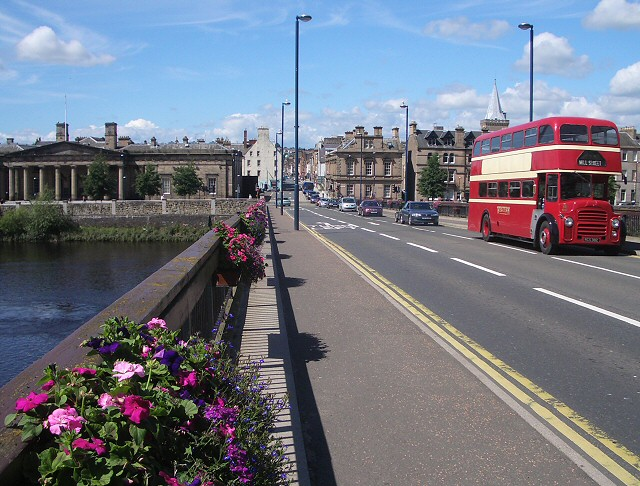
The bridge carries the pedestrian and vehicular traffic of South Street. This view is looking west into Perth

The bridge was erected at a cost of £150,000, the work of Whatlings Ltd and consulting engineers F. A. MacDonald & Partners.

Victoria Bridge was kept open during the construction of the new bridge by having its steel framework raised by 6 feet (2 m), with what would become its successor built beneath it.

== See also ==
- List of bridges in Scotland
