= Kinnoull Parish Church =

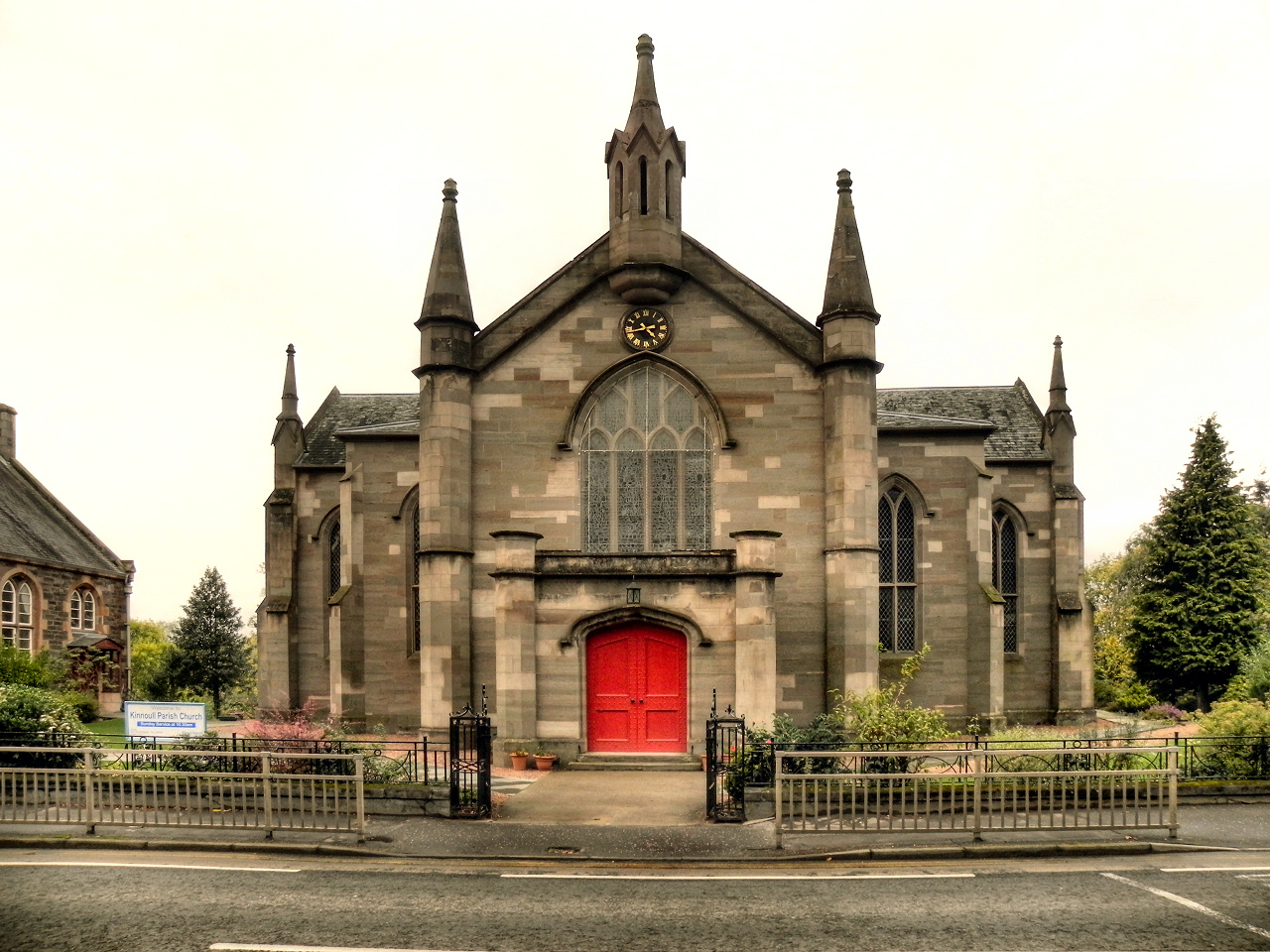
- The main (eastern) facade, which faces Dundee Road (2011)
- Kinnoull Parish Church
- 56°23′45″N 3°25′19″W
- Location: Kinnoull
- Address: Dundee Road, Perth
- Country: Scotland
- Language: English
- Denomination: Church of Scotland
- Website: http://www.kinnoullparishchurch.co.uk/

History
- Dedication: St Constantine

Architecture
- Architect: William Burn
- Completed: 1827 (199 years ago)

Scheduled monument
- Official name: Kinnoull Church
- Type: Ecclesiastical: burial ground, cemetery, graveyard; church
- Designated: 6 March 1997
- Reference no.: SM6627

Kinnoull Parish Church is a Church of Scotland church in the Kinnoull area of Perth, Scotland. A "Kinnoull Church" appears in documents when it was granted to Cambuskenneth Abbey in 1361. It was rebuilt in 1779 but demolished in 1826, after the completion of a church on the Perth side of the River Tay, which flows a short distance behind the church.

Standing on Dundee Road, today's church was built in 1827 to a design by William Burn. The remains of the earlier 1635 church, which is a scheduled monument, can be seen further south on Dundee Road, adjacent to the Rodney Gardens. Included in the historic designation are the remains of the church, the burial aisle, churchyard and its boundary wall and the gravestones within the churchyard.

The Kinnoull family's vault is beneath the floor of the old church, and a monument to George Hay, 1st Earl of Kinnoull, is inside it. It shows Hay "dressed in his Lord Chancellor's robes, standing within an ivy-clad Corinthian portico, with a table on which rests the Great Seal of Scotland. Above is an intricate heraldic panel, supported by fruit, unicorns, shields and spearhead finials."

The most striking feature of the present church is the west-facing Millais window, which was installed in 1870 and consists of fourteen painted glass panels depicting the parables of Jesus. These are interspersed with beautiful flower motifs. The parables are based on woodcuts by Sir John Everett Millais, president of the Royal Academy and second husband of Effie Gray.

The church contains some other fine stained-glass, notably the Strachan window above the east door, which was installed in memory of Rev Dr John Anderson, minister from 1852 to 1897.

The church's pipe organ was unveiled by Dr Albert Lister Peace on 23 April 1896. It was a gift of Mrs Jasmine F. Fuller, of Rosebank. The organ was the work of the Hope–Jones Organ Company of Birkenhead. The organ cases were designed by Perth architect David Smart.

Between 1929 and 1930, the interior of the church was remodelled, which included a major rebuild of the organ. It was further rebuilt in 1957 but proved difficult to tune and maintain and was replaced by a three manual Makin digital instrument in 2008.

== Worship ==
Worship is held each Sunday, with services starting at 10.30 am, which are also livestreamed.

== Notable burials ==
- Effie Gray, wife of the critic John Ruskin and then of the artist John Everett Millais, is buried in the churchyard. Gray's father donated the Millais window, the West window, to the Church in 1870. It is based on designs drawn by Millais, whom Gray left Ruskin for. Gray's 20-year-old son, George, is also buried in the kirkyard

== Gallery ==
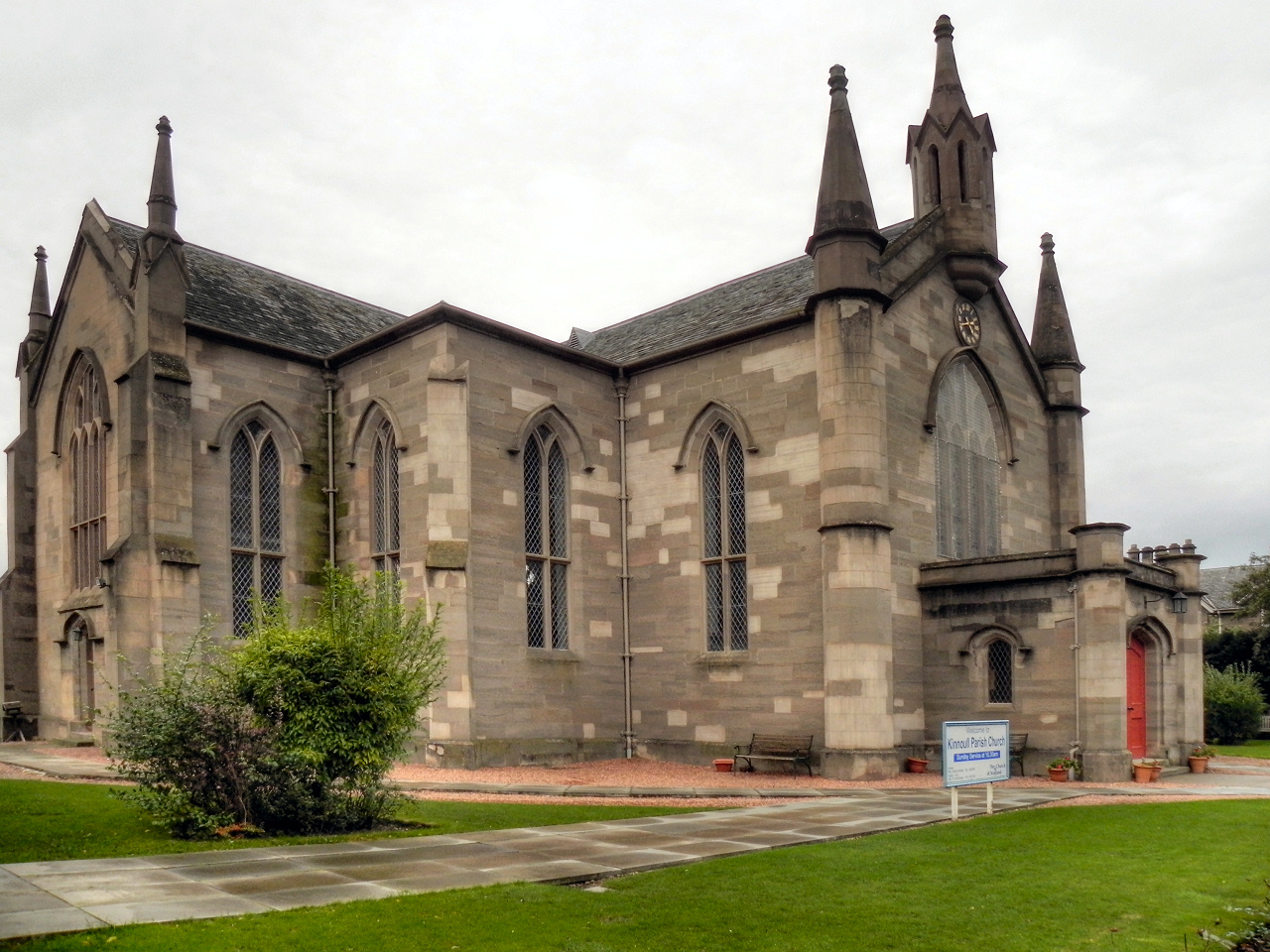
The southeastern corner

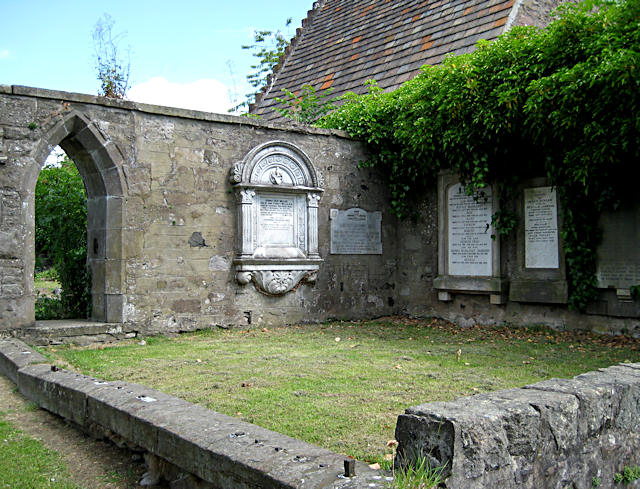
The medieval family graveyard

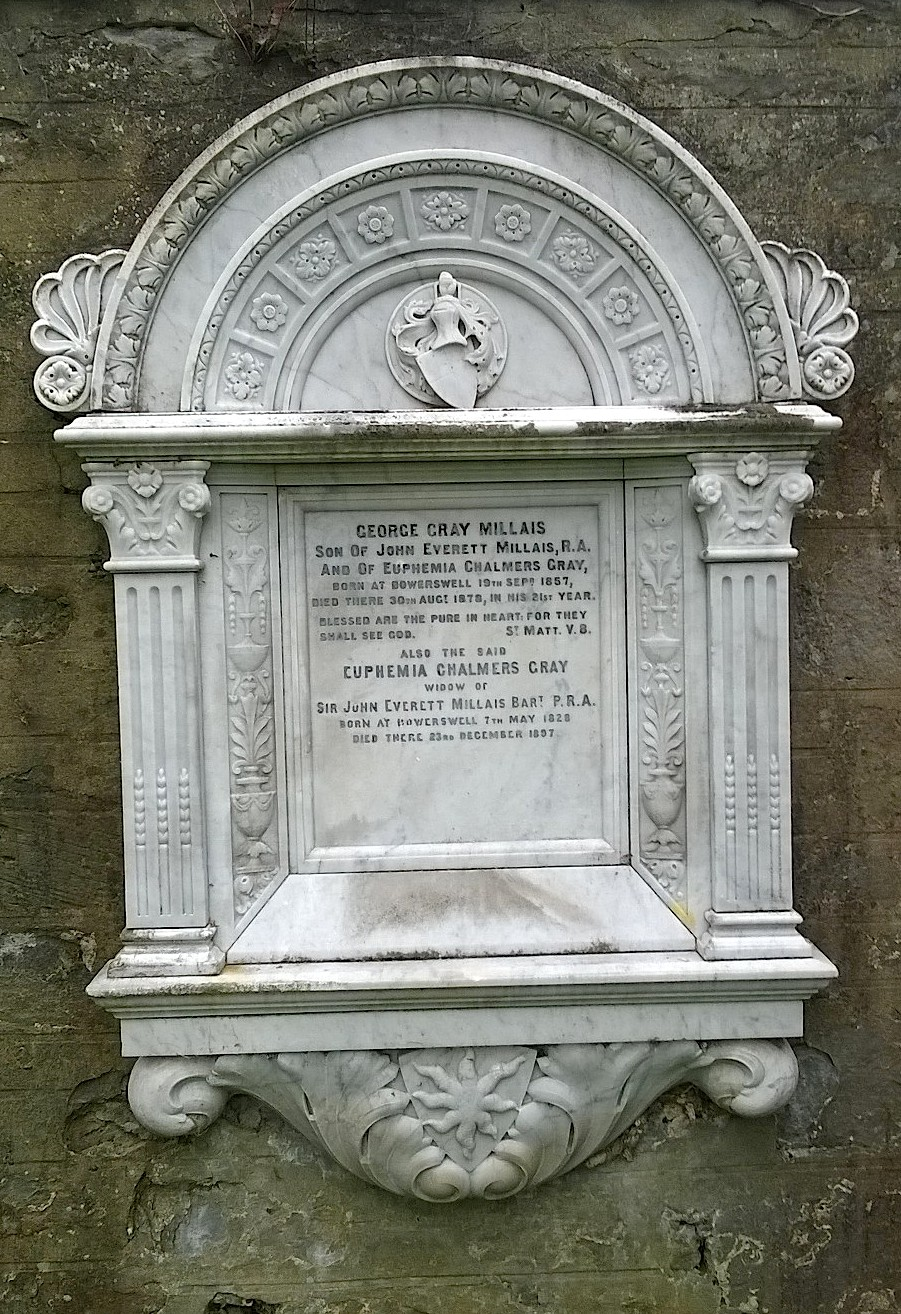
Grave marker of Effie Gray, which is shared with her son, George

== See also ==
- Scheduled monuments in Perth and Kinross
- List of listed buildings in Perth, Scotland
