= Ramada Jarvis =

British hotel chain

Ramada Jarvis Hotels
- Industry: Hospitality
- Founded: 1990
- Founder: John Jarvis
- Defunct: 2011
- Fate: Liquidation
- Headquarters: High Wycombe, England
- Area served: United Kingdom
- Products: Hotels
- Website: www.jupiterhotels.co.uk

Ramada Jarvis was a chain of 4 star and 5 star hotels mostly located throughout the mainland of the United Kingdom, with a few managed internationally. The group's 42 hotels in the UK and five overseas went into liquidation in 2011.

== History ==
The business was founded by former Hilton International Chairman and Chief Executive; John Jarvis in 1990 as Jarvis Hotels. Jarvis quickly purchased the 41-hotel Embassy Hotels chain from Allied-Lyons, initially, for a total of £202 million with the intention of building up a conference and short breaks-focused chain over five years before selling the chain on to a trade buyer. One of the 41 hotels which formed the deal was The Parkway Hotel in Leeds, of which Jarvis' father had once been the manager. The deal was later revised to a total figure of £186 million and completing in July 1990 with backing led by Candover Investments. Eight hotels were quickly placed on the market for sale by Jarvis, including the Royal Oxford Hotel in Oxford, the Royal Hotel in Cardiff and the Salutation Hotel in Perth.

In April 1991, the first of the chain of Sebastian Coe Health Parks opened at the Penns Hall Hotel in Sutton Coldfield. This was the result of a joint venture with Sebastian Coe and was seen as a way of bolstering the short breaks credentials of the hotel group.

Jarvis floated it on the London Stock Exchange in 1996 when it was valued at about £495 million. The company was taken private in 2003 in a management buyout for £159 million.

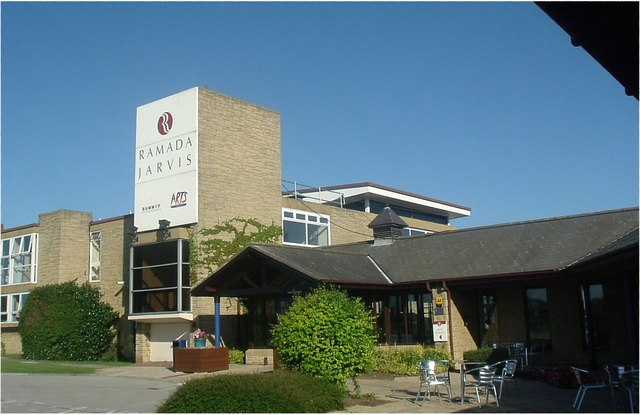
Ramada Jarvis hotel in Wetherby, West Yorkshire; this branch was put under the Mercure brand in 2011.

Ramada Jarvis went into liquidation on 30 September 2011 as a result of a severely restricted cash flow caused by the Group's principal bankers calling in loans before their term. 26 hotels were acquired by Jupiter Hotels Limited, a 50:50 joint venture between Patron capital and West Register, part of the Global Restructuring Group of the Royal Bank of Scotland Group. Those hotels have been re-branded Mercure Hotels under a franchise agreement with Accor. The joint venture investors are injecting £40m, with debt financing of £71m provided by RBS, HSBC and Bank of Ireland, which were the original lenders to Jarvis.

Not all the Ramada Jarvis hotels were included in the Jupiter Hotels deal, so the Ramada Heathrow Airport and the Ramada Glasgow Airport continue to trade as Ramada hotels, each as a franchise. In August 2012 the Ramada Heathrow property was re-branded as a DoubleTree by Hilton. In September 2016 the Ramada Glasgow Airport was rebranded as Courtyard by Marriott. The Ramada Jarvis at Junction 25 of the M1 was privately bought and now operates under the Best Western banner.
