= St John Street, Perth =

Street in Perth, Scotland

St John Street
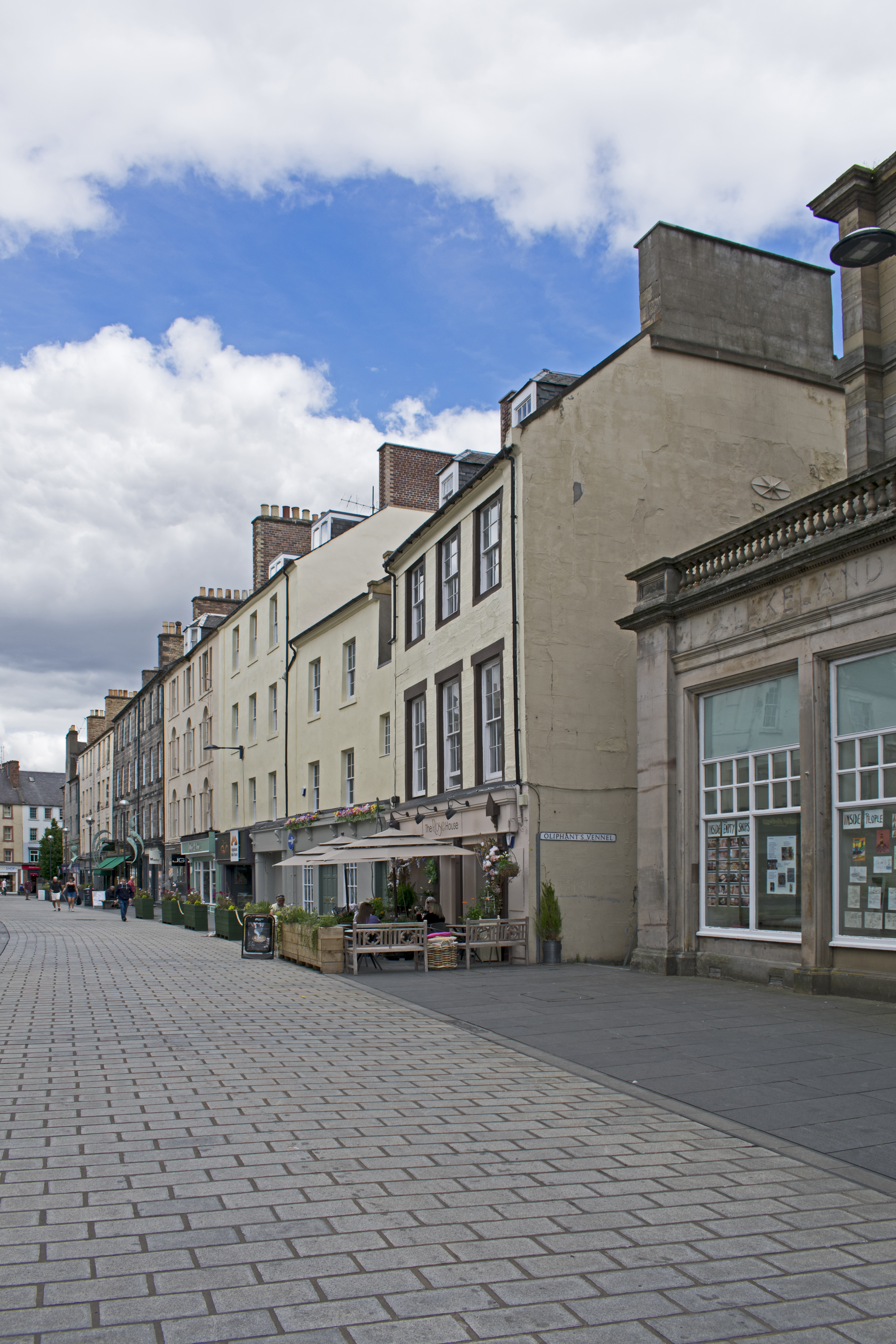
- Looking north to the High Street from beside St John's Kirk in 2022
- Interactive map of St John Street
- Length: 0.11 mi (0.18 km)
- Location: Perth, Perth and Kinross, Scotland
- North end: High Street
- South end: South Street

Construction
- Completed: 12th century

St John Street is an ancient street in the city of Perth, Scotland. It runs for about 0.11 miles (0.18 km) between High Street to the north and South Street to the south. St John's Place and South St John's Place, both formerly part of Kirkside which surrounds the ancient St John's Kirk, are the only junctions on the street, aside from a couple of vennels: Oliphants Vennel and Baxters Vennel, both of which connect St John Street to Watergate (which, along with Skinnergate, is one of the oldest streets in Perth).

St John Street bounds St John's Kirk to the east; Kirkside bounds it to the west.

== Listed buildings and structures ==
Historic Scotland has twenty entries for listed buildings on St John Street. Two are Category A, the rest Category B.

- 1 St John Street (44–46 High Street) (Category B)
- 2–4 St John Street (Category B)
- 3–5 St John Street (Category B)
- 7–13 St John Street (Category B)
- 10–16 St John Street (Category B)
- 15 St John Street (Category B)
- 17–23 St John Street (Category B)
- 18–24 St John Street (Category B)
- 25 St John Street (1–5 St John's Place) (Category B)
- 26–30 St John Street (Category B)
- 32–36 St John Street (Category B)
- 27–33 St John Street (Category B)
- St John's Kirk (St John's Place) (Category A)
- 35–39 St John Street (Category B)
- 38–40 St John Street (Category B)
- 42–44 St John Street (Category B)
- 48–50 St John Street (Category A)
- 58–60 St John Street (Category B)
- 62–70 St John Street (Category B)
- 72–76 St John Street (Category B)

McEwens department store occupied 56 St John Street between 1868 and 2016.
