= St Leonard's Church, Perth =

St Leonard's Church
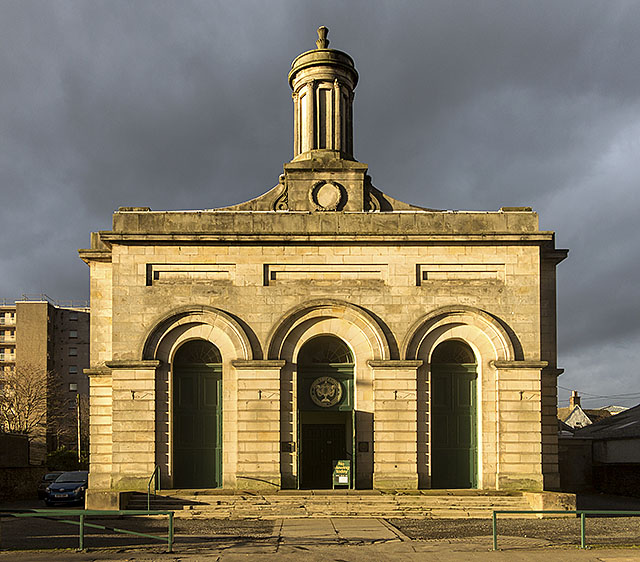
- The building in 2013, when it was an auction house, viewed from Charterhouse Lane
- St Leonard's Church
- 56°23′39″N 3°26′05″W
- Location: King Street, Perth, Perth and Kinross
- Country: Scotland

History
- Status: closed

Architecture
- Functional status: used
- Heritage designation: Category B listed building
- Designated: 20 May 1965
- Architect: William Macdonald Mackenzie
- Completed: 1836 (190 years ago)

St Leonard's Church is a former parish church building located in Perth, Perth and Kinross, Scotland. Standing on King Street, at the head of Charterhouse Lane, it was completed in 1836. It is now a Category B listed building. The church was designed by local architect William Macdonald Mackenzie.

James Smart made additions to the building in 1891, including the apse to the west which includes colourful high Victorian stained glass.

== See also ==
- List of listed buildings in Perth, Scotland
