= Frazer & Sons =

Scottish clothier

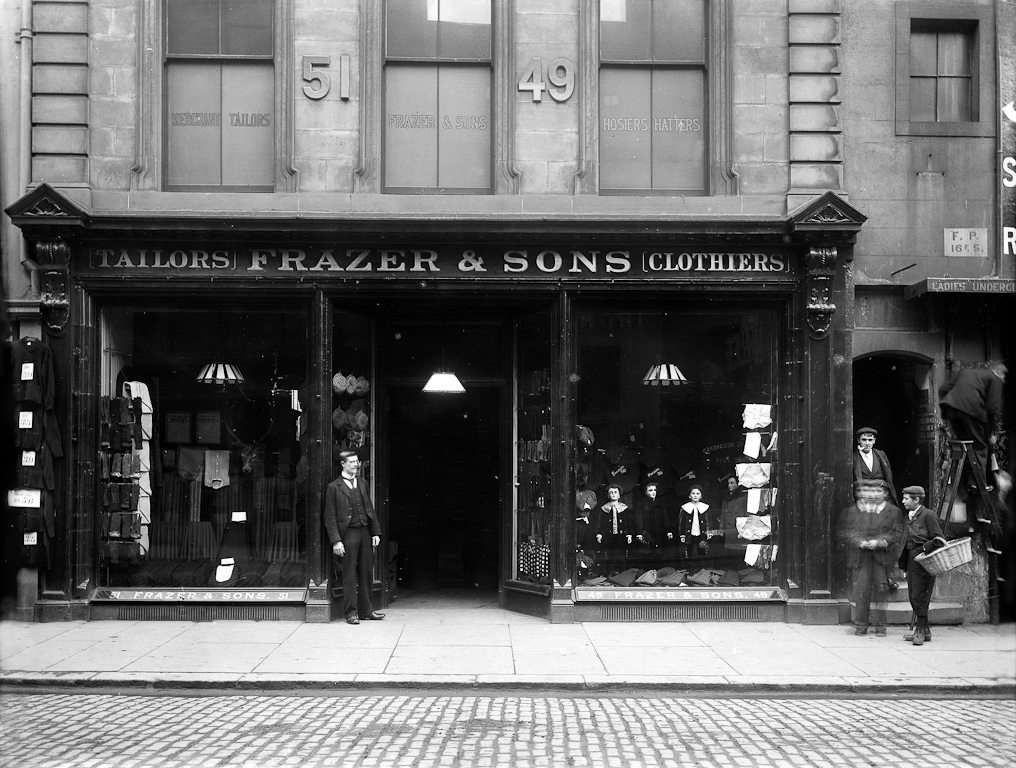
- The shop in the late 19th century, photographed by Magnus Jackson
- Industry: Clothier and tailor
- Founded: 1860s
- Founder: John Frazer
- Headquarters: Perth, Scotland, UK
- Area served: United Kingdom

Frazer & Sons was a clothier and tailor in the 19th and 20th centuries, based in Perth, Scotland. Used by the high class of the local society, the shop, located at 49 High Street, received a royal warrant of appointment in the 1930s.

The shop's owner was John Frazer.

Shortly after its opening, it was listed in Isaac Slater's Royal National Commercial Directory and Topography of Scotland.
