= 1–3 South Street =

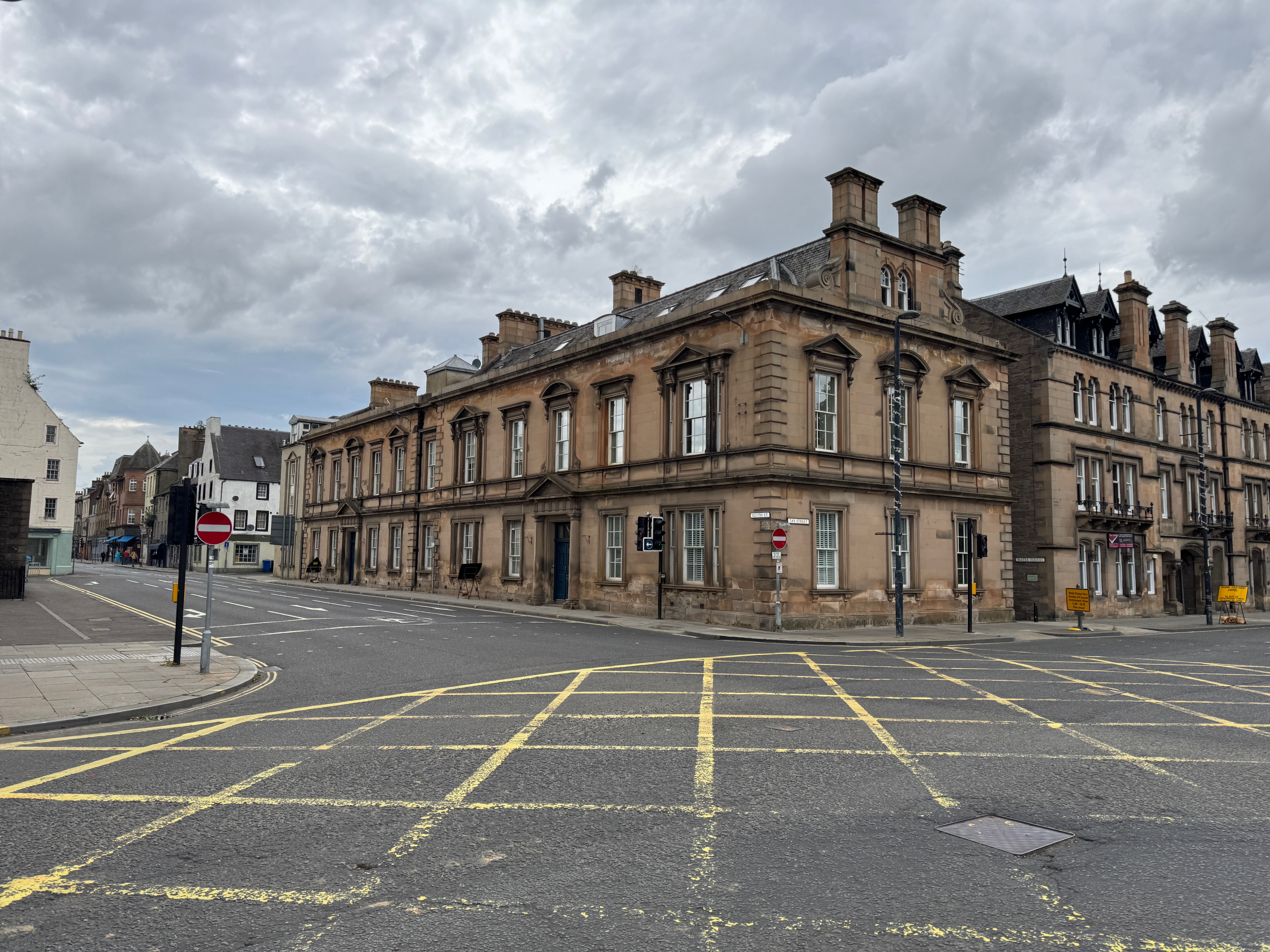
- The building in 2024, viewed from Tay Street

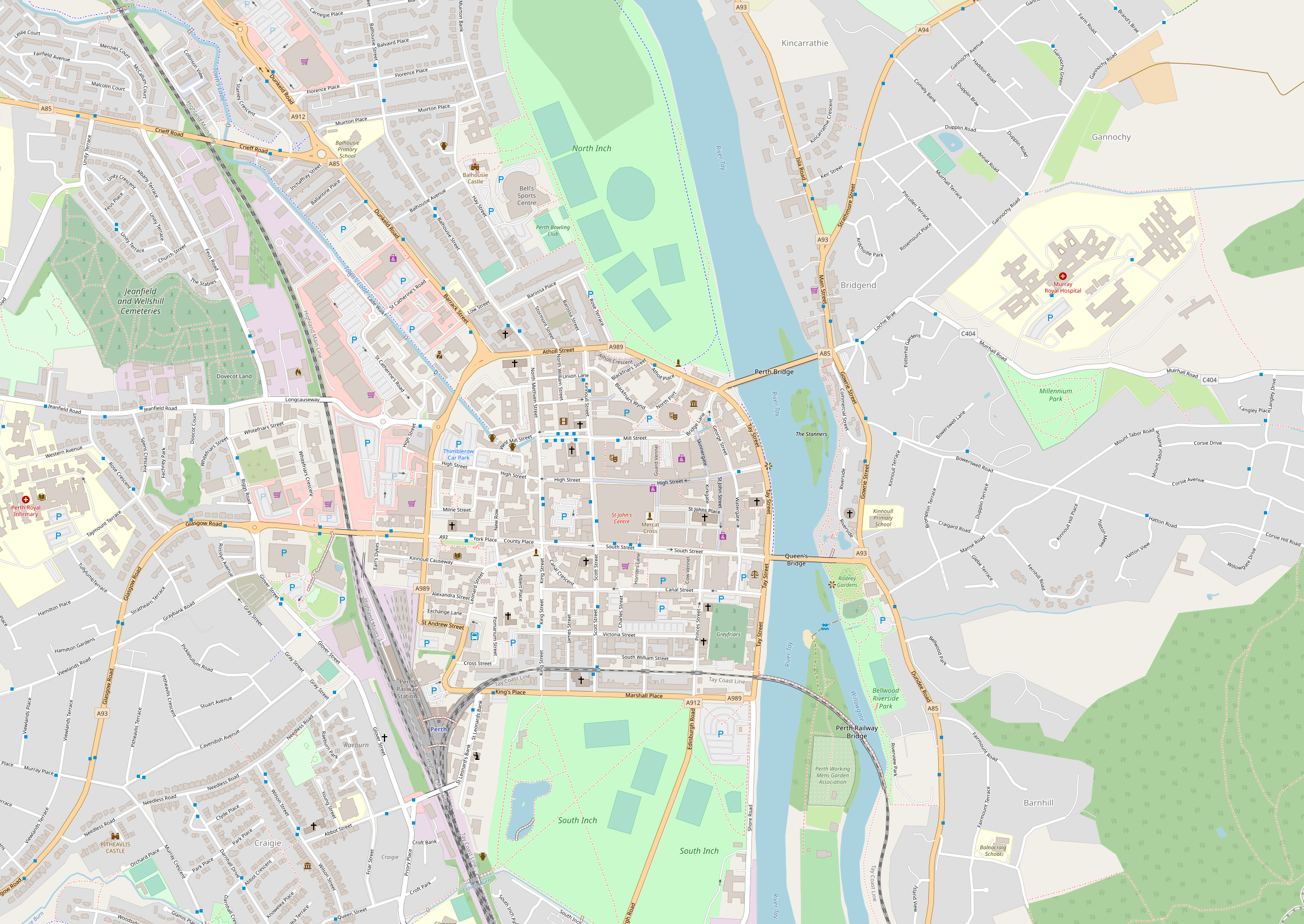
- Shown in Perth
- 56.395114°N 3.426284°W
- Location: 1–3 South Street, Perth

History
- Built: 1866 (160 years ago)

Site notes
- Architect: David Smart

Listed Building – Category B
- Designated: 20 May 1965
- Reference no.: LB39333

1–3 South Street (also known as Brand's Building) is a building in Perth, Scotland. Designed by local architect David Smart and built by Perth builders Robert Brand and Sons, the building is Category B listed, dating to 1866. Standing on South Street, with its eastern facade facing Tay Street, the building was originally the home of the River Tay Purification Board. It was later occupied by the Procurator Fiscal and Perth and Kinross Constabulary, which later merged with Angus Constabulary and City of Dundee Police to become Tayside Police.

The building is designed in the Italian Renaissance style and is constructed of ashlar, with two storeys and an attic. Its South Street frontage consists of two five-window sections linked by a recessed central bay. The entrances have pedimented Roman Doric doorpieces, while the ground-floor windows have lugged architraves. The first-floor windows include segmental and triangular pediments. The three-window elevation facing Tay Street has alternating pediments at first-floor level and a double-chimney feature incorporating two arched, keystoned windows supported by scrolls. The building has a slated roof.

The building was designated a Category B listed building on 20 May 1965. There is also evidence for a later institutional use that isn't mentioned in the article. A Perth and Kinross Council publication lists the Scottish Environment Protection Agency (SEPA) local office at 1 South Street, Perth, PH2 8NJ.

The building stands immediately to the east of Greyfriars Burial Ground.

== See also ==
- List of listed buildings in Perth, Scotland
