= Bank of Scotland (Perth, Scotland) =

Bank building in Perth and Kinross, Scotland

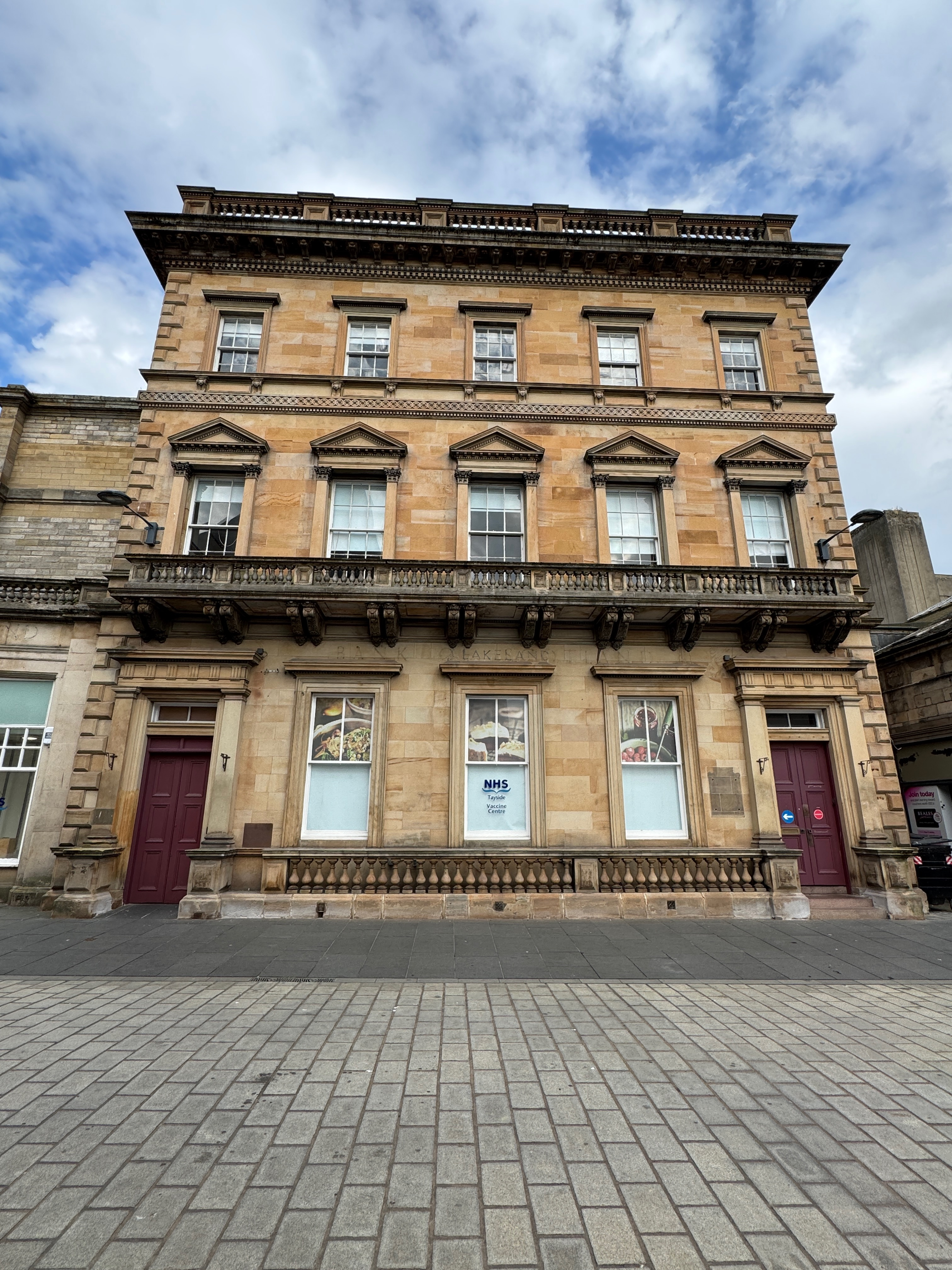
- The building in 2024

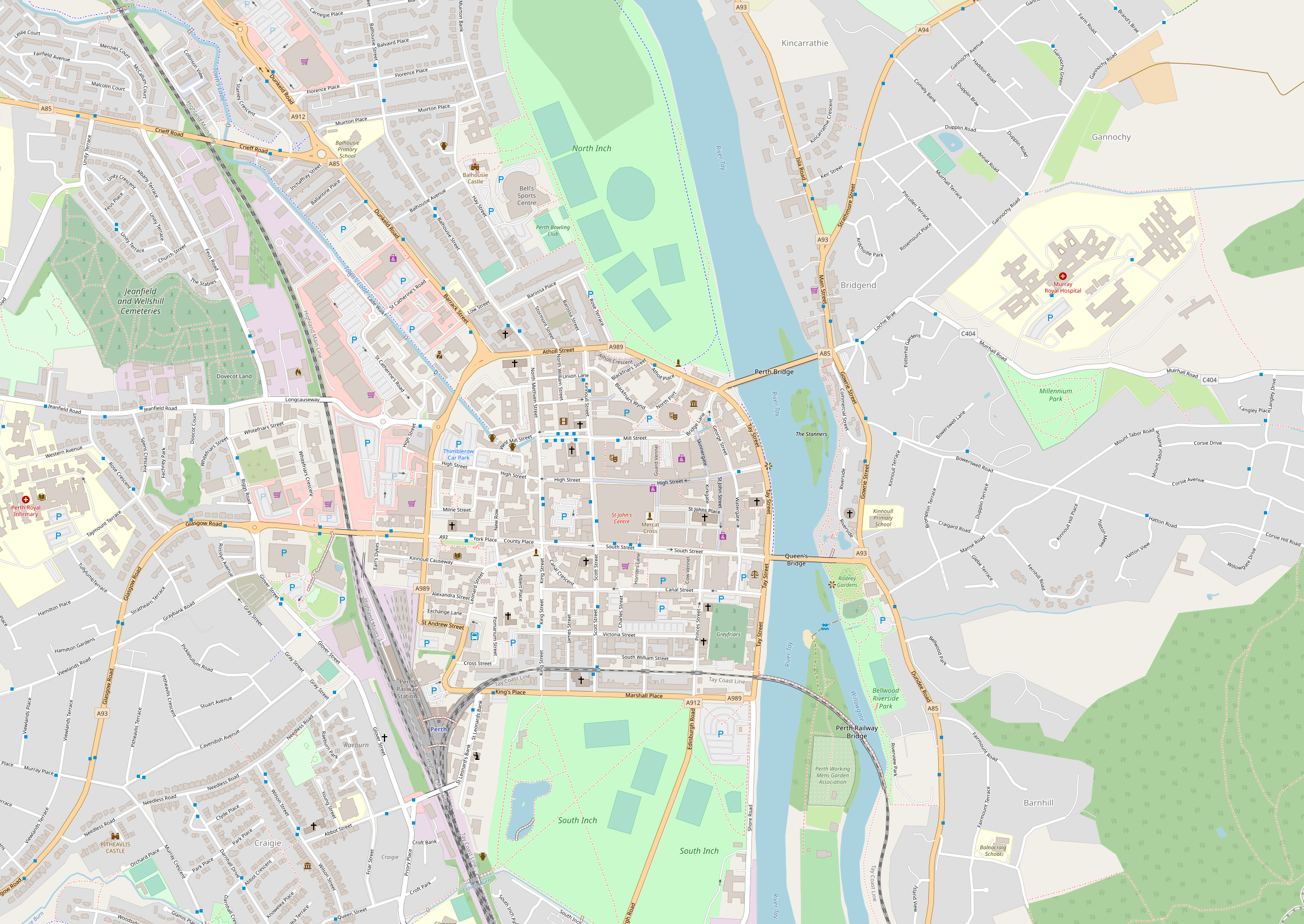
- Shown in Perth
- 56.395706°N 3.427165°W
- Location: 48–50 St John Street, Perth

History
- Built: c. 1846 (180 years ago)

Site notes
- Architect: David Rhind
- Architectural style: Italian Renaissance

Listed Building – Category A
- Designated: 20 May 1965
- Reference no.: LB39618

Bank of Scotland is a historic building at 48–50 St John Street in Perth, Scotland. Designed by David Rhind, the building is a Category A listed structure dating to 1846. It has also been a Central Bank.

== See also ==
- List of Category A listed buildings in Perth and Kinross
- List of listed buildings in Perth, Scotland
