= Balhousie Castle =

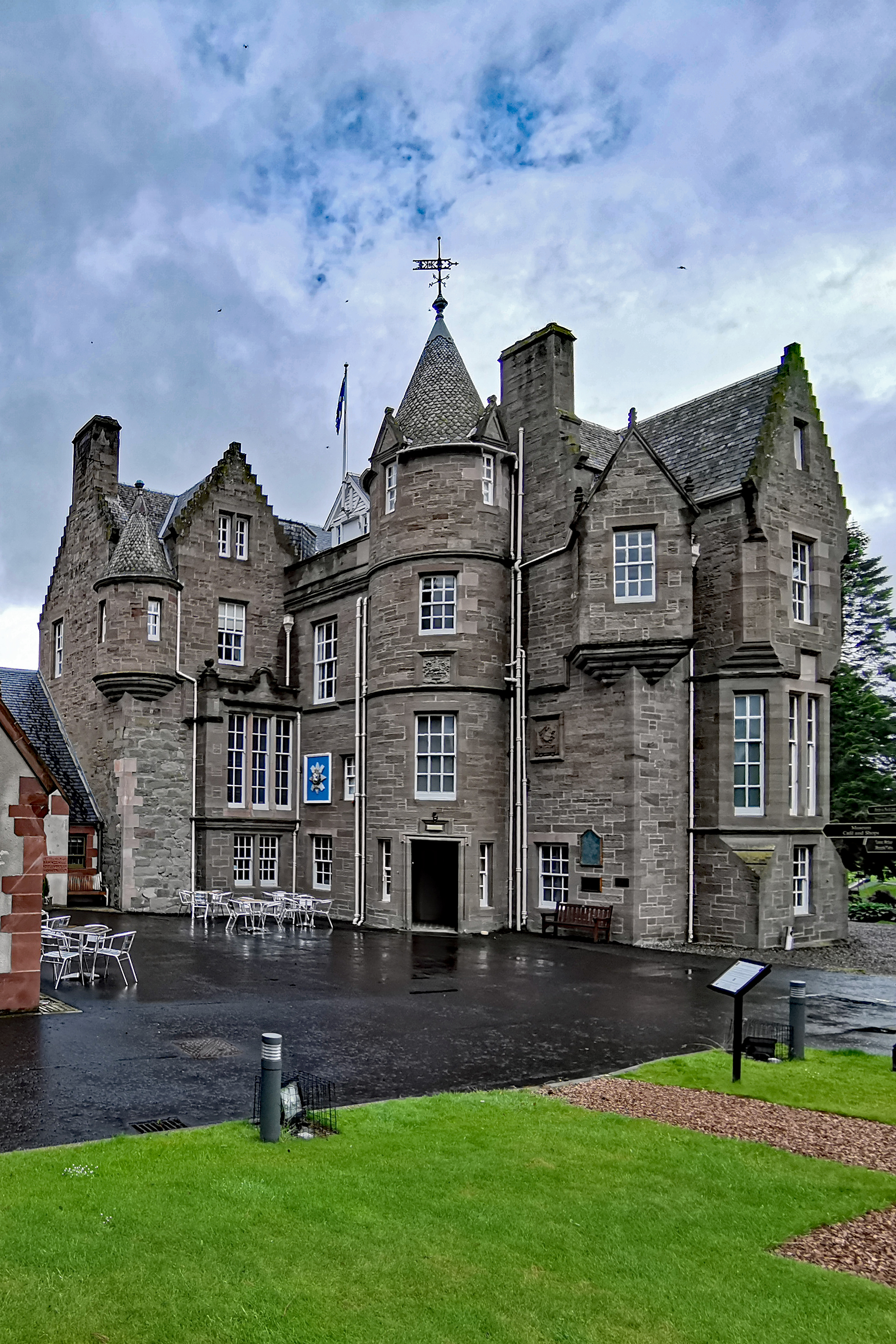

- Shown in Perth and Kinross
- Established: As a museum in 2009
- Location: Perth, Scotland
- Coordinates: 56.4034°N 3.4366°W
- Type: Regimental museum
- Website: www.theblackwatch.co.uk

Balhousie Castle, located in Perth, Scotland (on Hay Street, originally a few hundred metres north of the medieval town), was built in the 17th century.

== History ==
The castle was built in 1631, although its origins are believed to go back a further three hundred years. It originally served as the seat of the Earls of Kinnoull, and stood within a walled enclosure containing subsidiary buildings, orchards etc., on a terrace overlooking the North Inch. After falling into neglect in the early 19th century, the Castle was 'restored' (in fact, virtually rebuilt), and extensively remodelled on a larger scale between 1862 and 1864 in the Scottish Baronial style by the architect David Smart. No original features survive except for parts of the original rubble walls on the east side.

The Regimental Trustees of the Black Watch bought Balhousie Castle in January 2009 and it became the Regimental Headquarters and Museum of the regiment. The museum displays the history of the regiment from 1739 to the present. The Black Watch Heritage Appeal was launched in September 2009 allowing the regiment to raise in excess of £3.2 million to develop Balhousie Castle to provide a permanent home for the museum and archive of The Black Watch.

The castle contains No Surrender, a painting by Frank Feller (1848–1908), showing the aftermath of the Battle of Magersfontein (11 December 1899) in the Second Boer War.

== In popular culture ==
A wall at "the picturesque old ruin" of Balhousie Castle was used for the wall in the 1858–59 painting, The Love of James the First, of Scotland, by John Everett Millais. A reference photograph was taken, with the model's hand dropping a love-letter from the window.

== Gallery ==
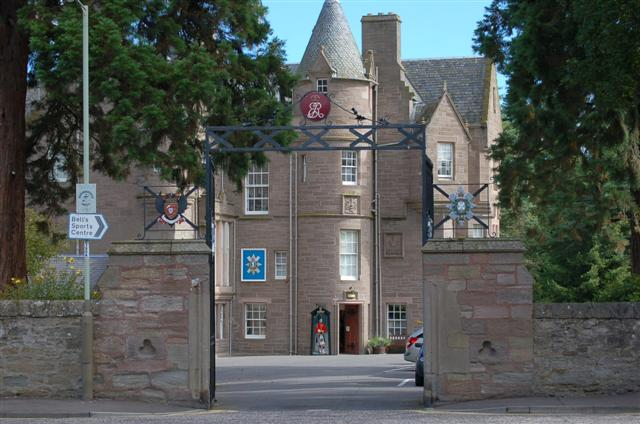
The entrance to the castle, viewed through the main gate.

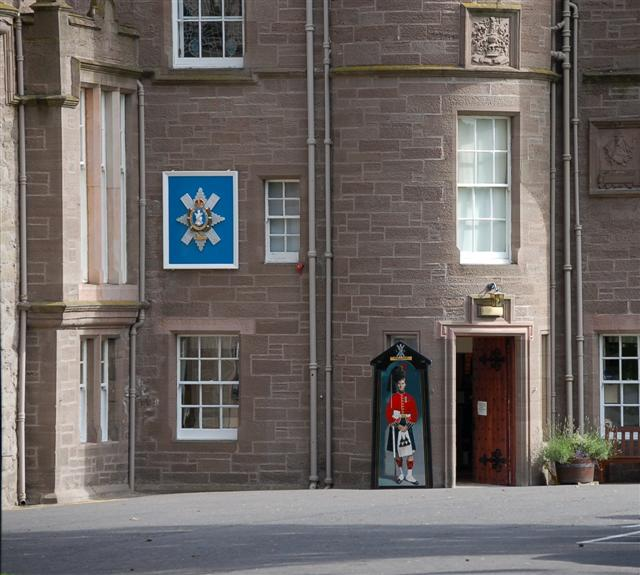
A close-up of the castle's entrance.

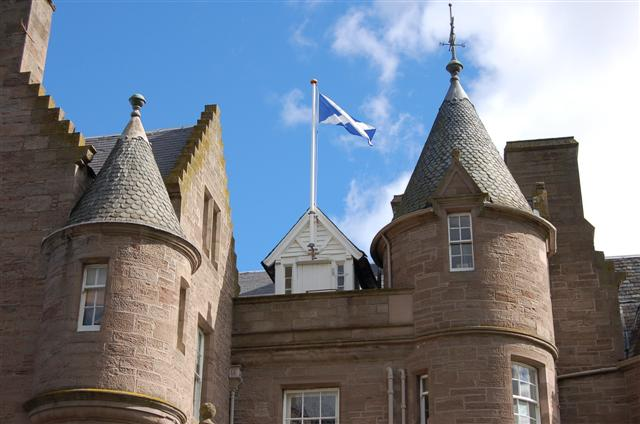
The castle's turrets.

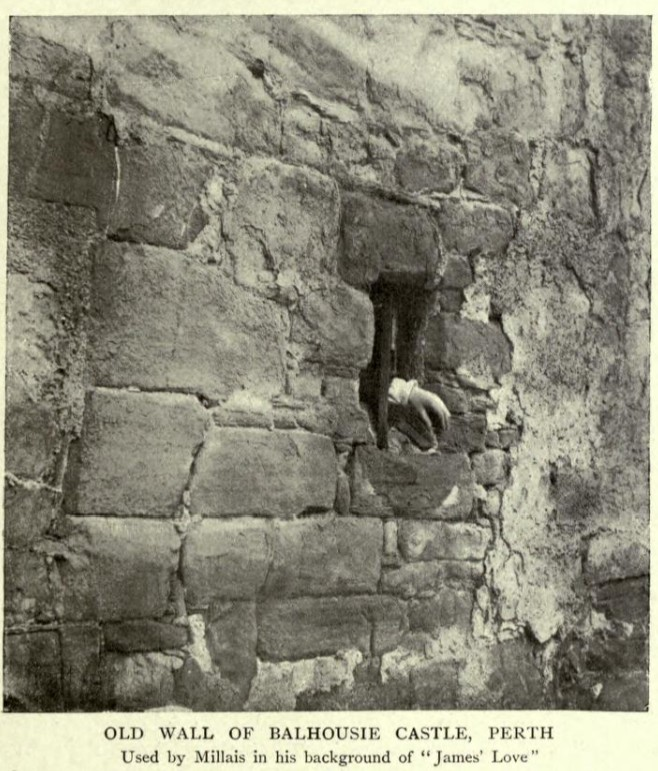
Reference photograph for The Love of James the First, of Scotland by John Everett Millais, taken at Balhousie Castle ruins, 1858 or earlier.

== See also ==
- List of listed buildings in Perth, Scotland
