= Fergus Purdie =

Scottish architect

- Occupation: Architect
- Awards: FRIBA; RIAS
- Practice: Fergus Purdie Architects (established in 1993)
- Design: Artist Residence, Perth

Fergus Purdie is a Scottish architect. He is a fellow of both the Royal Institute of British Architects and the Royal Incorporation of Architects in Scotland. He is also a full academician of the Royal Scottish Academy.

In 2018, Purdie put forward a design to revamp a space off of Guard Vennel in Perth city centre for use as a temporary events space. The plan was approved, on a city-wide scale, in March 2019.

The offices of Fergus Purdie Architects, which was established in 1993, are at 5A Melville Street in Perth. The company designed the building, known as the Artist Residence, which won several awards.
