= Watergate (Perth, Scotland) =

Street in Perth, Scotland

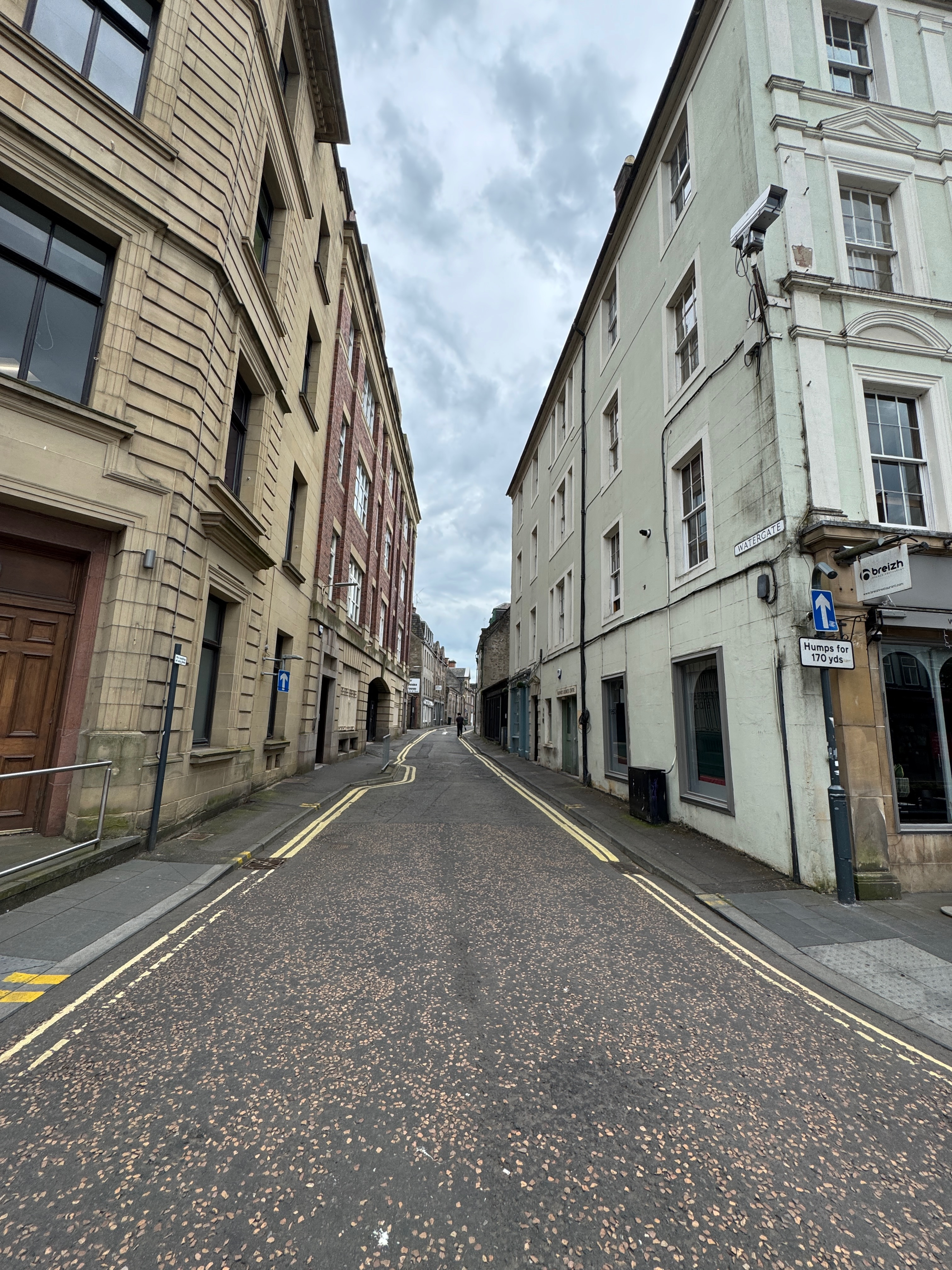
- Pictured in 2024, viewed from Perth High Street
- Interactive map of Watergate
- Length: 0.12 mi (0.19 km)
- Location: Perth, Perth and Kinross, Scotland
- North end: High Street
- South end: South Street

Watergate is a street in the city of Perth, Scotland. Along with Skinnergate, it is one of the oldest streets in the city. It runs for around 0.12 miles (0.19 km) from High Street in the north to South Street in the south. It runs parallel to Tay Street to the east and St John Street to the west. At South Street, the road becomes Speygate, the former site of Gowrie House.

Several historic buildings stand on the street, including the post-medieval Dower House (also known as the Town House), 81 Watergate (Category C listed), 21–31 Watergate (Category C listed, dating to 1725) and 1–5 Watergate (Category B listed) and St Matthew's Hall and Church Officer's House (Category C listed) at 34 Watergate. A house that formerly stood on the west corner of Watergate, facing the High Street, was called the House of the Green. It was the oldest house in Perth at the time of the building's demolition. A timber-framed building stood in Watergate into the 1960s.

== Vennels ==
The below vennels begin or end on Watergate.

- Baxters Vennel (St John's Place to Watergate)
- Oliphants Vennel (44 St John Street to Watergate)
- Water Vennel (Tay Street to 83 Watergate)
