= Salutation Hotel =

Hotel in Perth, Scotland

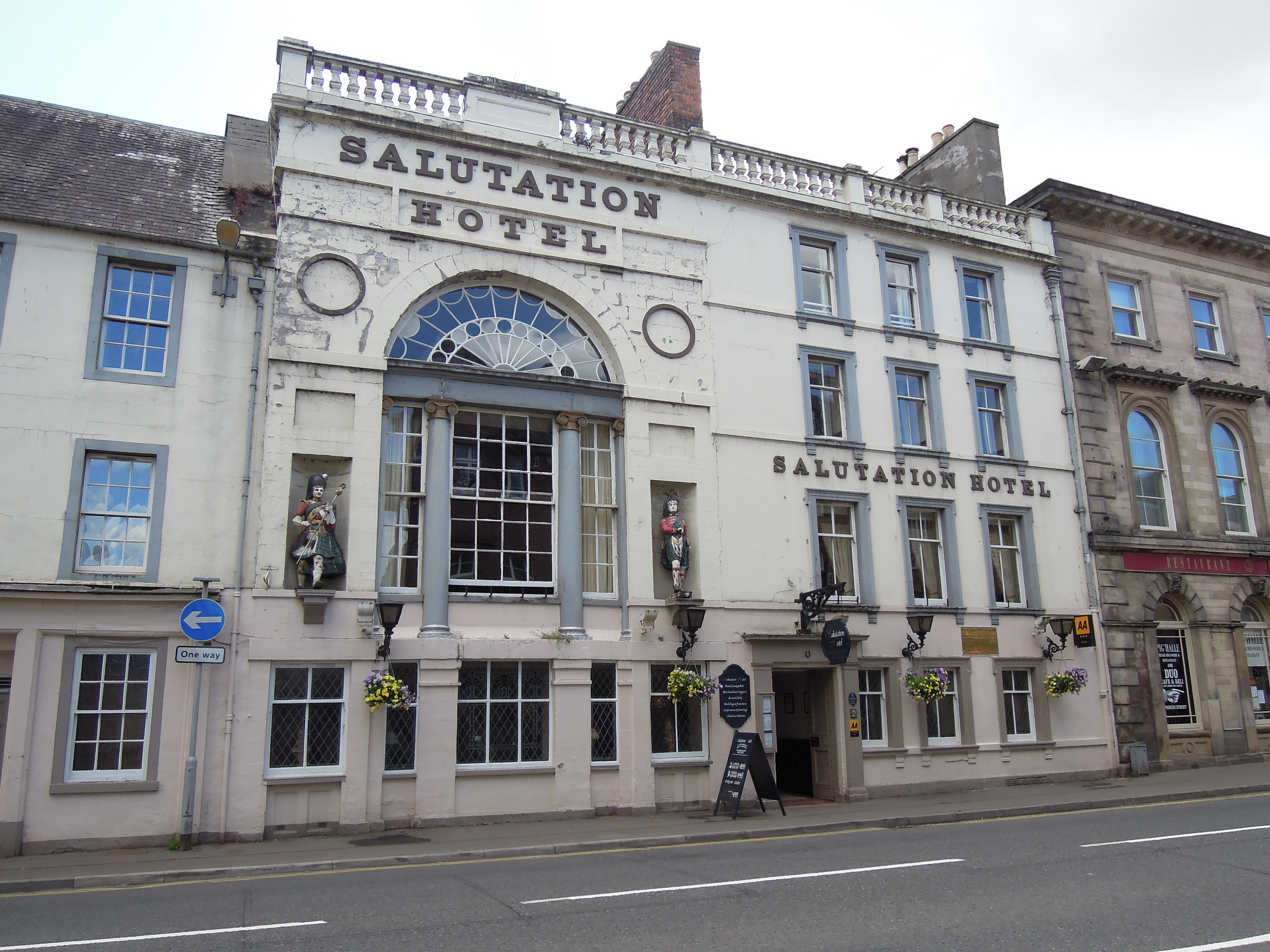
- The building in 2013
- Interactive map of the Salutation Hotel area

General information
- Type: Hotel and restaurant
- Architectural style: Georgian
- Location: 30–36 South Street; Perth, Perth and Kinross, Scotland
- Coordinates: 56°23′42″N 3°25′40″W
- Completed: Circa 1810 (216 years ago)
- Owner: Strathmore Hotels

Technical details
- Floor count: 2–4

Other information
- Public transit: Perth

Website
- www.strathmorehotels-thesalutation.com

Listed Building – Category B
- Official name: 30-36 SOUTH STREET, SALUTATION HOTEL
- Designated: 20 May 1965
- Reference no.: LB39646

The Salutation Hotel is a hotel and restaurant in Perth, Perth and Kinross, Scotland. It is a Category B listed building dating to around 1810, with earlier embellishments and later alterations. It is said to be the oldest hotel building in Scotland. It has expanded to occupy three neighbouring tenements, one to the right and two to the left.

== History ==
The earliest building recorded on this site was a private house belonging to the Murray family. It operated as a coaching inn between 1699 and 1745, and was a resting point on the coach roads from Edinburgh and Glasgow to the south to Aberdeen and Inverness to the north. The current street elevation was constructed in the early 19th century, at which time the Venetian window was added by Sir Robert Reid, the King's architect in Scotland.

On 31 December 1745, a belated 25th birthday party for Bonnie Prince Charlie was held at the hotel.

The building's facade has distinctive painted Black Watch figures.

Inside, in room number 20, a stone fireplace is dated 1699. In the courtyard, to the rear, there is a stone dated 1619 bearing arms of the Earl of Moray.

David Bowie played a show at the hotel, in the Moncreiffe Suite, on 7 November 1969. The Beatles also stayed at the hotel.

A renovation project of the hotel's exterior won the biennial Perth Civic Trust Award in 2016.

In August 2026, Strathmore Hotels, which is based in East Kilbride and owns the Salutation Hotel and seven other hotels in Scotland and Northern England, went into administration.

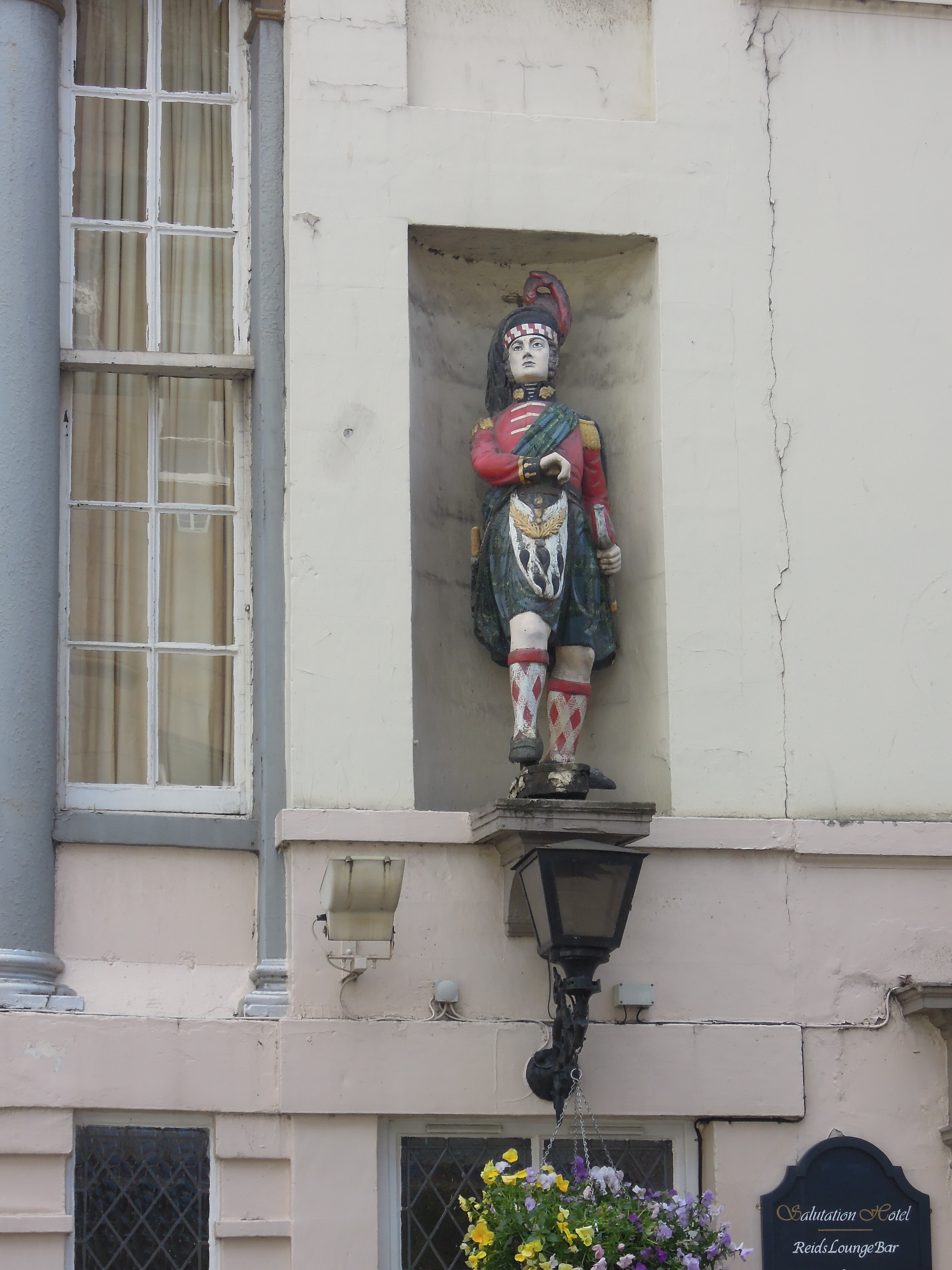
One of the two statues on the hotel façade

== Facilities ==
The hotel has a bar (Reid's) on the ground floor and a restaurant (The Adam) on the first floor.

== See also ==
- List of listed buildings in Perth, Perth and Kinross
