= Malcolm Warner =

English art historian and curator

- Born: Malcolm John Warner; May 17, 1953 (age 73); Aldershot, Hampshire, England
- Occupations: Art historian, curator

Malcolm John Warner (born May 17, 1953) is an English art historian and curator who lives in the United States.

Warner was born in Aldershot, Hampshire, England. Malcolm Warner is now the Director of the Laguna Art Museum in Laguna Beach, California, and was previously the Deputy Director of the Kimbell Art Museum in Fort Worth, Texas from 2007-2012, having held his position as senior curator since 2002. Previous positions include research curator at the Art Institute of Chicago, curator of European art at the San Diego Museum of Art, and senior curator of Paintings and Sculpture at the Yale Center for British Art. He received his Ph.D. from the Courtauld Institute of Art, University of London on the professional career of John Everett Millais.

He is responsible for the organization of many important exhibitions such as The Victorians; British painting from 1837-1901 at the National Gallery of Art in Washington D.C. (1997), Stubbs and the Horse, an exhibit at the National Gallery of London of paintings, engravings, and detailed anatomical studies of horses done by George Stubbs, This other Eden: paintings from the Yale Center for British Art, The Mirror and the Mask; Portraiture in the age of Picasso, and Butchers, Dragons, Gods and Skeletons, a collection of film installations by Philip Haas.

The New York Times review of Warner's book for The Victorians exhibition said that, in addition to the expected "languidly draped ladies of the popular Pre-Raphaelite painters", readers "may be pleasantly surprised . . . by some of the other color plates (and substantial explications)". The Contemporary Review called this book "an important work for all students of the Victorian era", and added, "The descriptions of the paintings by Malcolm Warner, assisted by other scholars, provide a model of the way to explain the symbolism and significance of works of art in a detailed but easily understood manner." His other books include The Phaidon companion to art and artists in the British Isles with Michael Jacobs (1980), and Friendship and loss in the Victorian portrait: May Sartoris by Frederic Leighton (Yale University Press, 2009).

Dr. Warner has served as the director of the Laguna Art Museum since January 2012.
