= Skinnergate =

Street in Perth, Scotland

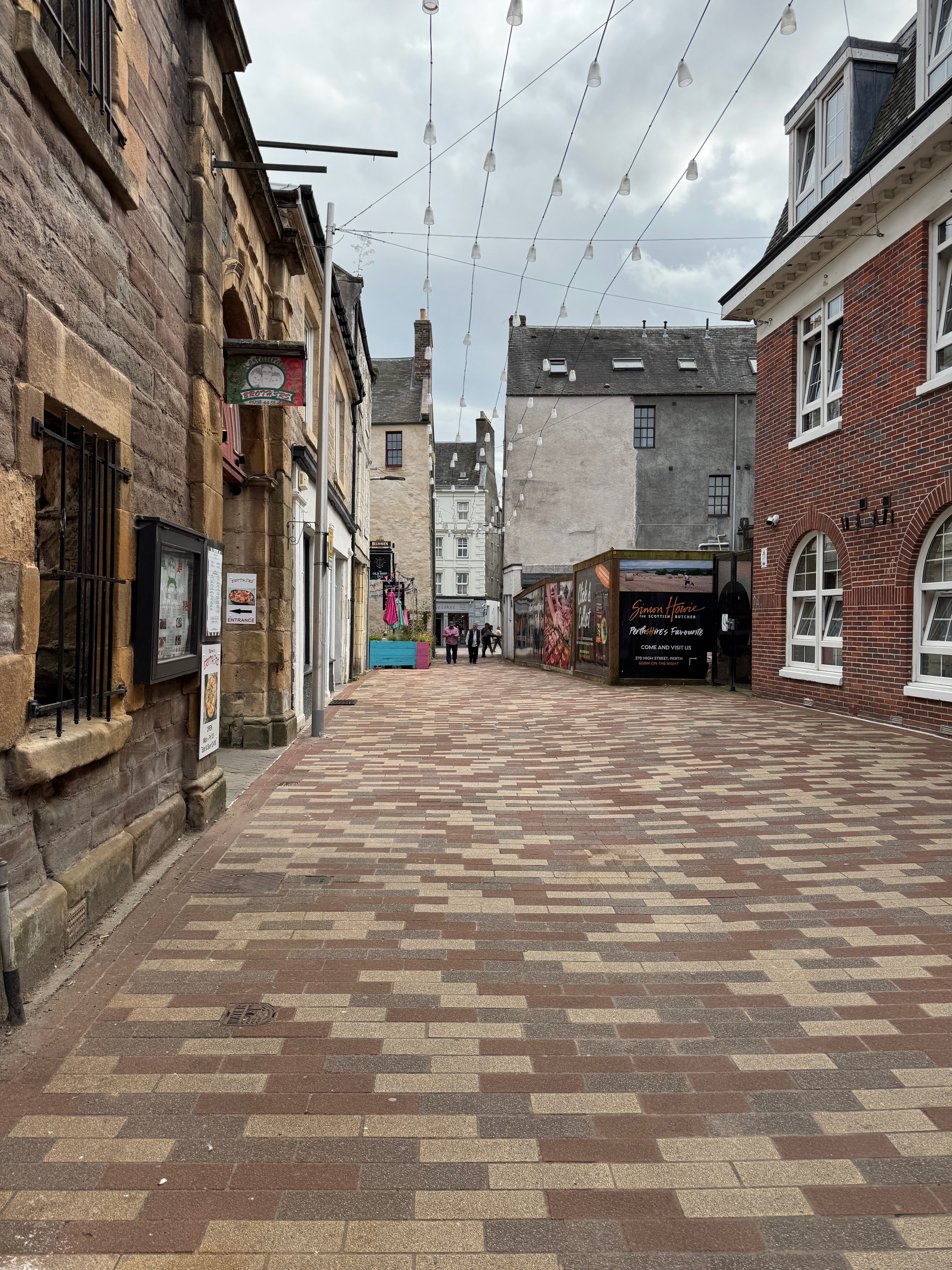
- A 2024 view, looking south to High Street
- Interactive map of Skinnergate
- Length: 0.76 mi (1.22 km)
- Location: Perth, Perth and Kinross, Scotland
- North end: Bridge Lane
- South end: High Street

Skinnergate is a street in the city of Perth, Scotland. Along with Watergate, it is one of the oldest streets in the city. It runs for around 0.76 miles (1.22 km) from Bridge Street in the north to High Street in the south. Its name is derived from the process of skinning animals and the tanning of their hides during the Middle Ages.

Between the 9th century and 1313, Perth Castle stood at the northern end of Skinnergate. Nothing remains of it above ground.

In medieval times, Skinnergate was the main route into the city from the north. Several crafts and trades associated with Perth were established here, just inside the burgh walls. These include those associated with leather, such as the Glovers Incorporation, founded in 1210.

Skinnergate formerly connected Kirkgate and St John's Kirk with a gateway through the city walls known as the Red Brig Port.

The Old Ship Inn, established in the late 19th century, stands at the corner of High Street and Skinnergate. It occupies the site of a previous Old Ship Inn, dating from at least 1665.

In the first half of the 20th century, artist John Guthrie Spence Smith (1880–1951) painted the oil-on-canvas "Skinnergate, Perth". It is now in the possession of the Wardlaw Museum.

== Archaeology ==
When a building in Skinnergate was demolished in 1854, around 300 coins dating to the reigns of Edward I and others were found. During archaeological work in Skinnergate between 1991 and 2013, a bone whistle was discovered.
