= Rodney Gardens =

Urban park in Perth, Scotland

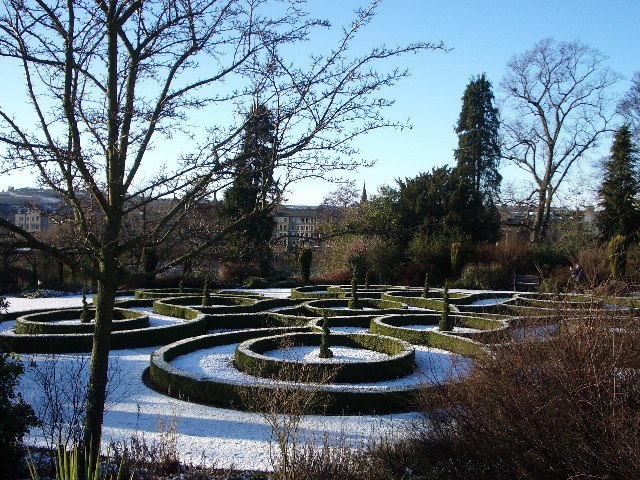
- The gardens in 2005

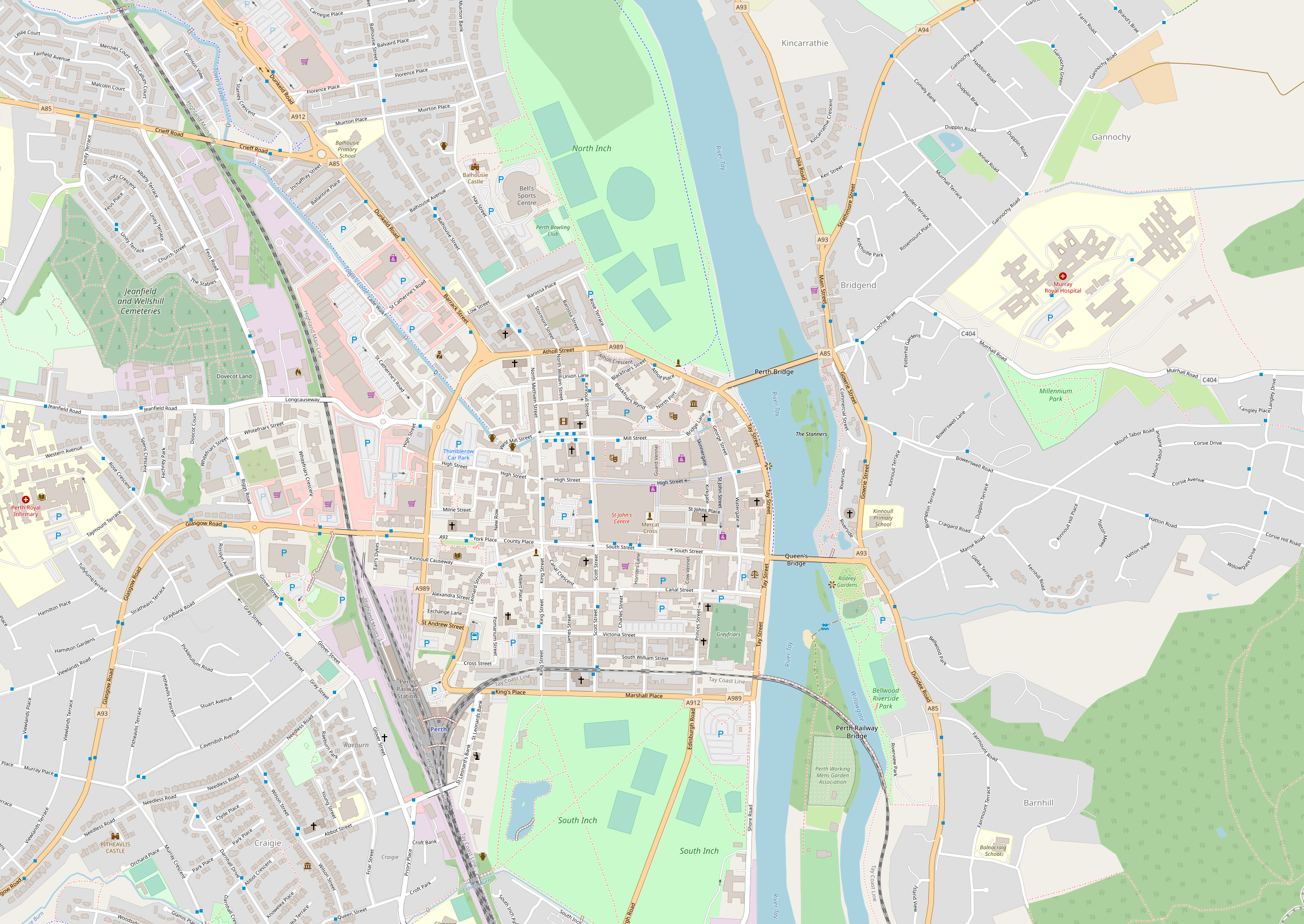
- Location within Perth
- Type: Urban park
- Location: Perth, Scotland
- Coordinates: 56.39471091°N 3.4221669°W
- Owner: Perth and Kinross Council
- Operator: Perth and Kinross Council

Rodney Gardens is an urban garden in the Kinnoull area of the Scottish city of Perth, on the eastern banks of the River Tay. Named for Admiral George Rodney of the Royal Navy, the gardens are situated on the former site of a mill.

One sculpture, known as "Millais Viewpoint", is by Tim Shutter. The view, through the two lower corners of a stone picture frame, recreates the view seen in the 1856 painting Autumn Leaves by John Everett Millais.

Immediately to the south of the gardens is Kinnoull Burial Ground, an ancient cemetery formerly part of an earlier guise of Kinnoull Parish Church. Its gates are kept locked; visitors wishing to enter are asked to get the keys from the reception in the adjacent Rodney Fitness Centre.

== Gallery ==
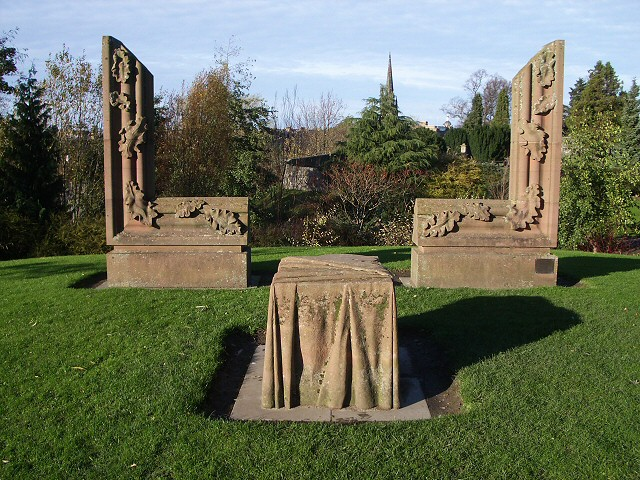
"Millais Viewpoint" sculpture
