= South Street (Perth, Scotland) =

Prominent street in Perth, Scotland

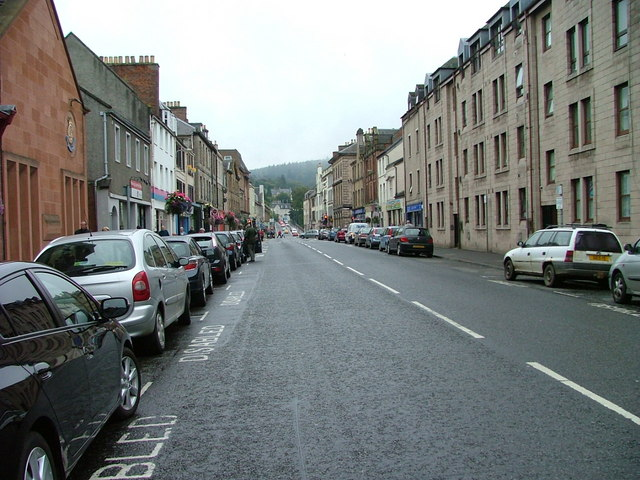
- Looking east on South Street to Kinnoull across the River Tay
- Interactive map of South Street
- Length: 0.48 mi (0.77 km)
- Location: Perth, Perth and Kinross, Scotland
- East end: Dundee Road (A85)
- West end: County Place (A93)

South Street is a prominent street in the Scottish city of Perth, Perth and Kinross. Established in at least the 15th century, it runs for about 0.5 miles (0.80 km), from the Dundee Road (the A85) in the east to County Place (the A93) in the west, passing through the entire breadth of the city. Queen's Bridge, completed in 1960 and opened by Queen Elizabeth II, carries South Street across the River Tay to and from Kinnoull.

Perth developed from an initial plan of two parallel streets: South Street and High Street — about 500 feet (150 m) to the north — in the 15th century, linked by several vennels leading north and south. Mill Street, to the north of High Street, followed shortly thereafter. South Street was originally terminated at its eastern end by Gowrie House (site of today's Perth Sheriff Court), which had an arched entrance from South Street. Upon its demolition in the early 19th century, direct access was granted to the Tay.

Perth's original William Low supermarket was on South Street. It later moved to Victoria Street, prior to a second location opening on the Crieff Road.

== Notable locations on South Street ==
From east to west

- Queen's Bridge
- 1–3 South Street
- Salutation Hotel

== Junctions ==
From east to west

- Watergate (north)
- Speygate (south)
- St John Street (north)
- Princes Street (south)
- King Edward Street (north)
- Scott Street (crosses)
- South Methven (north)
- King Street (south)

== Vennels ==
The below vennels begin or end on South Street.

- Cow Vennel (Canal Street to South Street) – so named because it is where people would drive their cattle onto the South Inch for grazing
- Fleshers' Vennel (St John's Place to 49 South Street)
- Horners Lane (South Street to Canal Street)
- Meal Vennel (South Street to 164 High Street). Described in 1907 as "an old thoroughfare, presently the resort of curio dealers, and the happy hunting-ground of collectors". Several labourers lived on the street in 1911.
- Ropemakers Close (South Street to Canal Street)
- Weaver Vennel (from and to South Street)

== Gallery ==
This 1832 map of Perth, by James Gardner, shows South Street as one of the three main streets in Perth at the time

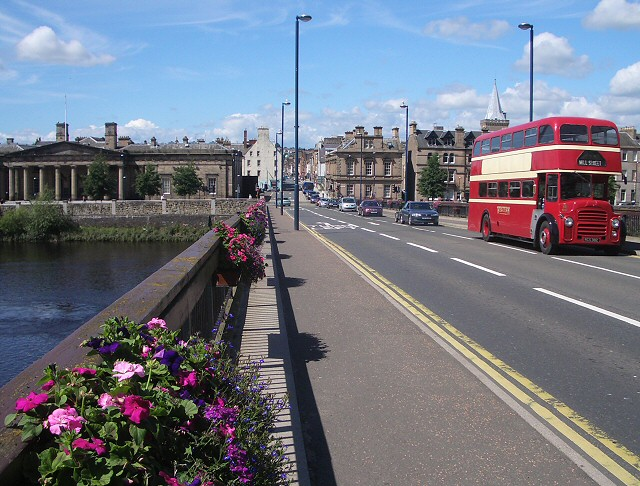
South Street crossing Queen's Bridge, with Perth Sheriff Court, the former site of the Gowrie House, in view on the left. 1–3 South Street is on the right

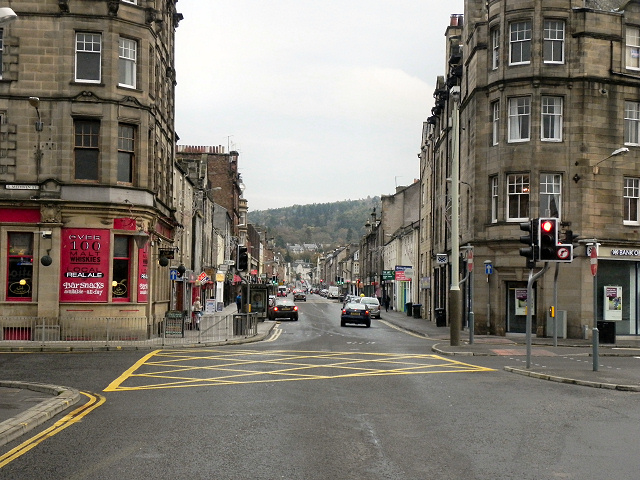
At South Methven Street, looking east to Kinnoull
