= David Smart (architect) =

Scottish architect, 1824–1914

- Born: 1824; Alyth, Perth and Kinross, Scotland
- Died: 13 October 1914 (aged 89–90); Kinnoull, Perth and Kinross, Scotland
- Occupation: Architect

David Smart (1824 – 13 October 1914) was a Scottish architect, eminent in the second half of the 19th century. His design genre varied between municipal buildings, schools and churches, but he worked almost exclusively in Perthshire.

== Early life ==
Smart was born in Alyth, Perth and Kinross, in 1824.

== Career ==
Although it is not known with whom he first apprenticed, he worked for many years in the office of David Bryce. It is rumoured that a disagreement in that office resulted in Smart leaving to take over the practice of William Macdonald Mackenzie from his widow in 1858. The quarrel was settled amicably.

By the late 1870s, Smart was worked with a relative, James Smart, who was his partner from around 1887. Their firm was D & J Smart. The partnership was dissolved shortly before the turn of the century, possibly due to the readmission of James Smart's son, John (born 1872), to the practice.

David retained the office at 42 Tay Street (part of the Victoria Buildings) in Perth, while James opened his at 28 York Place as James Smart & Son.

In 1907, David Smart began a partnership with his senior assistant Donald Alexander Stewart (born 1876), who had been articled to Smart since 1892. The firm became known as Smart & Stewart.

Smart retired around 1911 at the age of 86.

=== Selected notable works ===
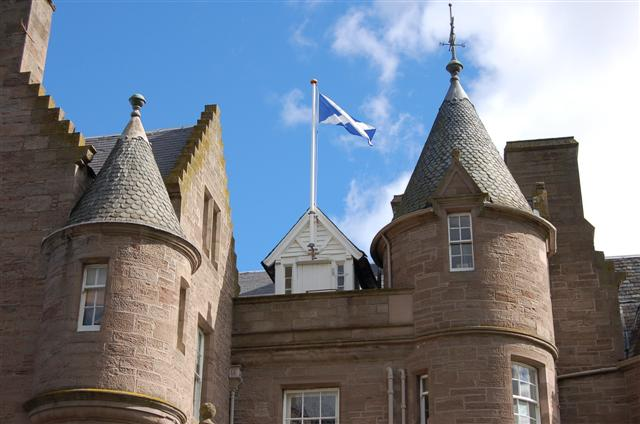
Perth's Balhouse Castle, which Smart significantly expanded in the 1860s

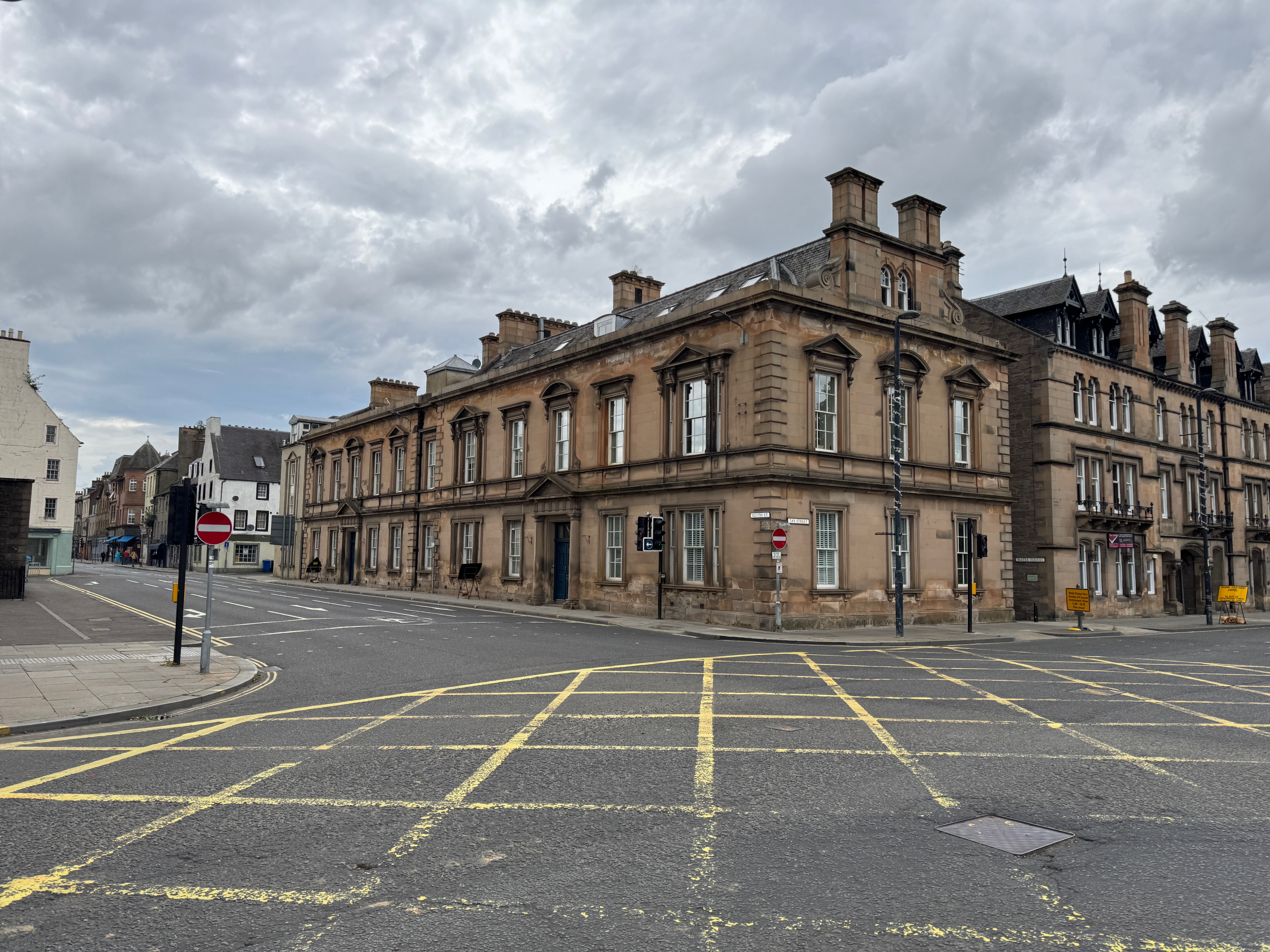
Brand's Building, 1–3 South Street, Perth

- Battleby, near Luncarty (1862)
- Balhousie Castle (1862) – restoration and enlargement
- 54 Tay Street (1866)
- Perth Sheriff Court and County Buildings, Perth (1866) – rebuilding of courtroom section of Sir Robert Smirke's building on square plan; internal remodelling and new buildings on South Street
- Station Hotel, Perth (1866) – not the same building as today's Station Hotel, but was on the same street
- Perth Royal Infirmary (original location; 1867) – relocated and reconstructed William Mackenzie's lodge in a different form
- Brand's Building, South Street, Perth (1899)

== Personal life ==
Smart was married to Margaret Morrison, with whom he had three daughters. One of his daughters was Jane Greig Smart, who died in 1952.

Smart's nephew, James, also became a noted architect.

=== Death ===
Smart died on 13 October 1914, aged 90, while living at Rockbank in Kinnoull. This house, at 13 Brompton Terrace, is now known as Lanesmeet.
