= High Street (Perth, Scotland) =

Prominent street in Perth, Scotland

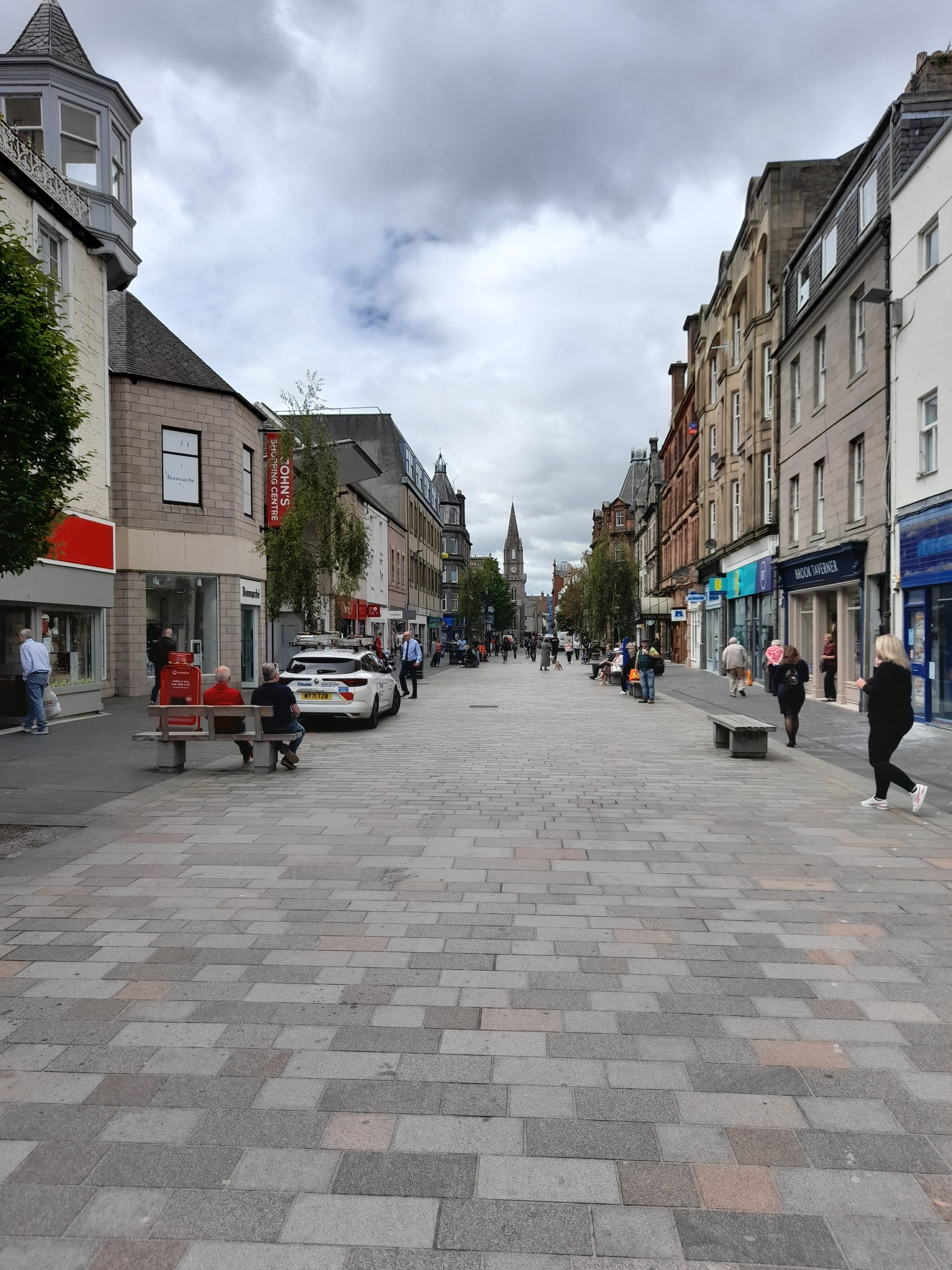
- A 2022 view, looking west to St Paul's Church
- Interactive map of High Street
- Length: 0.50 mi (0.80 km)
- Location: Perth, Perth and Kinross, Scotland
- East end: Tay Street (A989)
- West end: Caledonian Road (A989)

High Street is a street and the primary retail area of the Scottish city of Perth. Established in at least the 15th century, its central section has been both modernised and pedestrianised, while its two ends are mainly Victorian in terms of their composite buildings. It runs for about 0.5 miles (0.80 km), from Tay Street (the A989) in the east to Caledonian Road (also the A989) in the west.

== Layout ==
High Street, as a whole, is one of the three major east–west running streets in the city centre, the others being Mill Street to the north and South Street to the south, although Mill Street was a later addition. The River Tay runs perpendicular to the eastern end of the street, at Tay Street, where more Victorian-era buildings now stand, as well a stone tablet indicating the site of a bridge that was destroyed in 1621.

There is an entrance to St John's Centre from the pedestrianised section of the modern High Street.

== High Street ==
Beginning at Tay Street and continuing west to South Methven Street.

In a 1980 photograph by W. H. Findlay, a view of 80–94 High Street (part of a Category B listed row) shows the Wallaces department store. It was demolished two years later.

== Old High Street ==
Paradoxical in name, the Old High Street is a continuation of the original thoroughfare, but dating to the 19th century. It runs for 0.16 miles (0.26 km) from South Methven Street in the east to Caledonian Road in the west. Today's eastern origin is punctuated by St Paul's Church, in the middle of its square, at the corner of Old High Street and South Methven Street. According to Historic Environment Scotland: "This 1807 church has significant historical and streetscape importance. It was one of the first churches to be built in Perth after the Reformation." The church was built near the Chapel and Hospital of St Paul, founded in 1434, which hints at an earlier existence of the high street. The site is now occupied by Victorian-era buildings.

Established in 1897, Alexander Thomson & Sons Grocers and Wine Merchants was a popular vendor on the street. Thomas' son, Peter, later established Peter Thomson (Perth) Limited further along the street.

The Old High Street exemplifies how comparatively narrow the medieval street was.

== Junctions ==
From east to west

- St John Street (south)
- Skinnergate (north)
- Kirkgate (south)
- King Edward Street (south)
- Kinnoull Street (north)
- Scott Street (south)
- South Methven Street (crosses)
- St Paul's Square (south)
- New Row (south)
- Milne Street (south)
- Paul Street (north)
- Lickey Street (south)

=== Vennels ===
Below is a list of the vennels that connect to the High Street.

- Cow Vennel (Mill Street to High Street) (Canal Street to South Street) – so named because it is where people would drive their cattle onto the South Inch for grazing
- Cutlog Vennel (Mill Street to High Street)
- Guard Vennel (Mill Street to High Street)
- Meal Vennel (South Street to High Street)

== Archaeology ==
Between 1975 and 1977, an archaeological excavation was undertaken at 75–95 High Street. The project "highlighted the preservative qualities of the anaerobic middens of the burgh". Almost thirty medieval wooden structures were found, including a collapsed wattle fence that had been a property line between burgage plots.

== Gallery ==
This 1832 map of Perth, by James Gardner, shows the street, then a uniform "High Street"

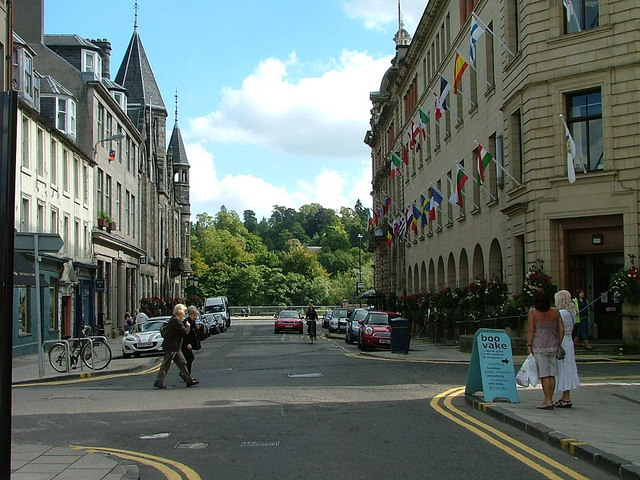
Looking east to Tay Street

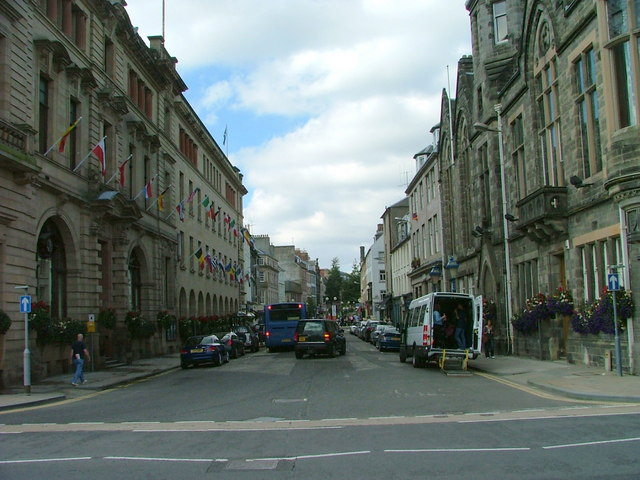
And west, towards the modern section, from Tay Street

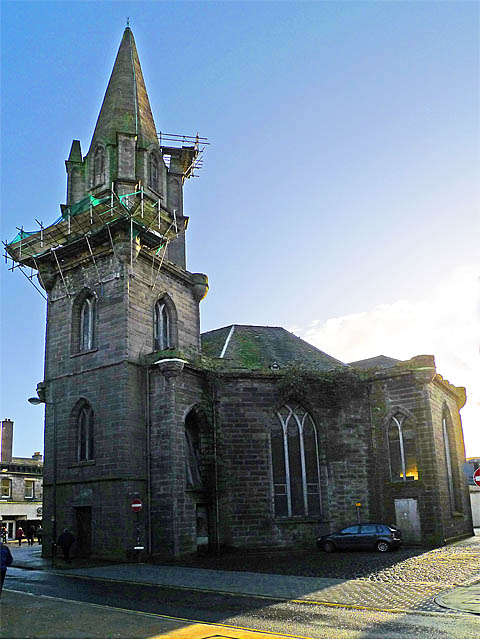
St Paul's Church

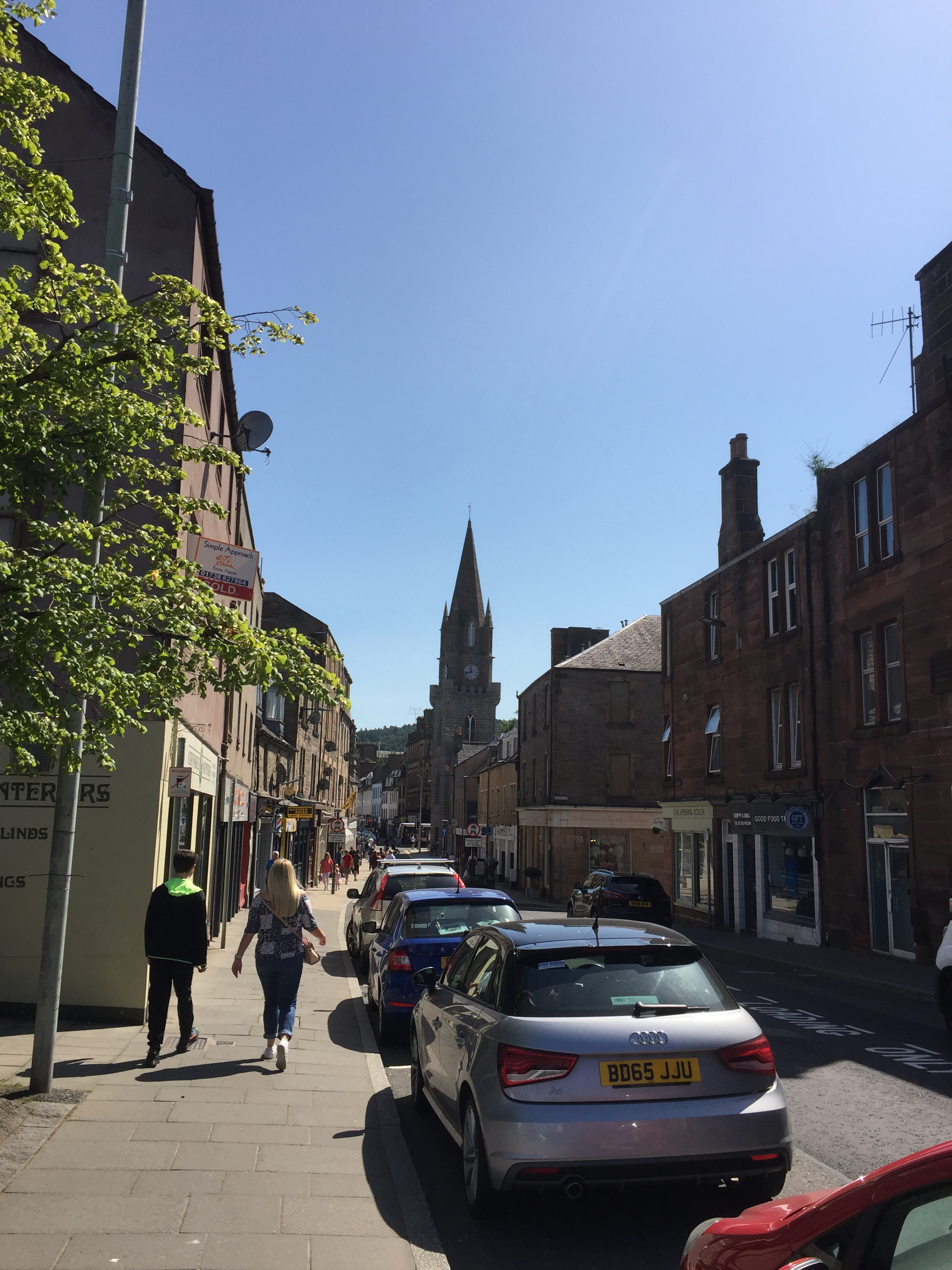
Looking east

== See also ==
- Frazer & Sons
