= List of people educated at Perth Academy =

Perth Academy is a non-denominational state school in Perth, Scotland.

== Alumni ==
Image	Name	Class year	Notability	Reference(s)
—	Ian Abbot		Poet	
—	Arthur Kinmond Bell		Distiller and philanthropist	
—	James Bisset		Artist, manufacturer, writer, collector, art dealer and poet	
—	Francis Black		Politician serving in the Legislative Assembly of Manitoba	
—	Neil Cameron, Baron Cameron of Balhousie		Senior officer in Royal Air Force	
—	John Forbes Cameron		Mathematician, academic and academic administrator	
Aileen Campbell	Aileen Campbell		Scottish Government Cabinet Secretary for Communities and Local Government	
Colin Campbell	Colin Campbell		British Army officer and colonial governor	
—	Iain Donald Campbell		Biophysicist and academic	
—	Patrick Campbell		Vice-admiral in the Royal Navy	
—	Alastair Cram		Mountaineer, lawyer and British Army officer	
—	John Keir Cross		Scriptwriter, author, ventriloquist	
Arthur Dewar, Lord Dewar	Arthur Dewar, Lord Dewar		Member of UK parliament and judge	
—	Gordon Duff		Medical scientist and academic	
Thomas Duncan	Thomas Duncan		Portrait and historical painter	
—	David Edward		Lawyer and academic, and former Judge of the Court of Justice of the European Communities	
—	Robert Fairbairn		Banker and cricketer	
—	John Forfar		Paediatrician and academic	
Patrick Geddes	Patrick Geddes		Biologist, sociologist, geographer, philanthropist and pioneering town planner	
Stephen Gethins	Stephen Gethins		Member of UK parliament	
Neil A. R. Gow	Neil A. R. Gow		Professor of Microbiology and deputy vice chancellor at the University of Exeter	
—	Camilla Hattersley		Olympic swimmer	
—	Mary Packer Harris		Artist and art teacher	
—	Atholl Henderson		Football player and coach	
David Octavius Hill	David Octavius Hill		Painter and arts activist	
—	Edward Lindsay Ince		Mathematician	
—	William Keiller		Anatomist	
Henry Littlejohn	Henry Littlejohn		Surgeon, forensic scientist and public health official	
—	David Low		Agriculturalist	
Fred MacAulay	Fred MacAulay		Comedian	
—	Robert MacDonald		Minister of the Free Church of Scotland	
—	James MacGregor		Minister of the Church of Scotland	
—	John Sturgeon Mackay		Mathematician and academic author	
—	George Mathewson		Chairman of Royal Bank of Scotland	
Patrick Matthew	Patrick Matthew		Grain merchant, fruit farmer, forester, and landowner	
—	James McGhie, Lord McGhie		Chairman of the Scottish Land Court and President of the Lands Tribunal for Scotland, and a Senator of the College of Justice	
—	Thomas McWhannell		Member of the Queensland Legislative Assembly	
—	James Miller		Architect	
—	Stephen Milne		Olympic swimmer	
—	Robert MacGregor Mitchell, Lord MacGregor Mitchell		Lawyer, judge and member of UK parliament	
Robert Pullar	Robert Pullar		Liberal politician	
—	John Monteath Robertson		Chemist and crystallographer	
—	Ronald Foote Robertson		President of the British Medical Association	
—	Condie Sandeman		Advocate	
—	Philip Scott		Professional football	
—	Rhod Sharp		Broadcaster	
—	Jack Shaw		Businessman, former chairman of the board of directors and Governor of the Bank of Scotland	
Richard Simpson	Richard Simpson		Member of the Scottish Parliament	
—	Mili Smith		Professional curler	
Duncan Sommerville	Duncan Sommerville		Mathematician and astronomer	
William Soutar	William Soutar		Poet and diarist	
—	Brian Souter		Billionaire businessman	
James Stewart	James Stewart		Physician and missionary	
—	David Kinnear Thomson		Chairman and president of Peter Thomson (Perth) Limited	
—	William Thomson		Mathematician and physicist	
—	Anthony Toft		President of the Royal College of Physicians of Edinburgh	
John Wishart	John Wishart		Mathematician and agricultural statistician	
—	Sandy Wylie, Lord Kinclaven		Senator of the College of Justice, a judge of the Supreme Courts of Scotland	
