= David Stewart (cricketer, born 1924) =

Scottish cricketer

Personal information
- Full name: David Stewart
- Born: 21 May 1924; Perth, Perthshire, Scotland
- Died: 2 May 2006 (aged 81); Perth, Perthshire, Scotland
- Batting: Right-handed
- Bowling: Right-arm medium

Domestic team information
- Years: Team
- 1950: Scotland

Career statistics
Competition	First-class
Matches	1
Runs scored	7
Batting average	7.00
100s/50s	–/–
Top score	5*
Balls bowled	102
Wickets	2
Bowling average	10.50
5 wickets in innings	–
10 wickets in match	–
Best bowling	2/12
Catches/stumpings	–/–
- Source: Cricinfo, 1 November 2022

David Stewart (21 May 1924 – 2 May 2006) was a Scottish first-class cricketer.

Stewart was born at Perth in May 1924 and was educated there at Perth Academy. A club cricketer for Perthshire, Stewart made a single appearance in first-class cricket for Scotland against Ireland at Perth in 1950. He took 2 wickets for 12 runs in the Ireland first innings with his right-arm medium pace bowling, dismissing Stanley Bergin and Roderick Gill. He batted twice in the match, being dismissed for 2 runs in the Scotland first innings by James Boucher, while in their second innings he ended unbeaten on 5. Outside of cricket, Stewart was a Meat and Livestock Commission Office manager. He died at Perth in May 2006.
