= Ian MacPherson =

Ian MacPherson, Macpherson or McPherson may refer to:

- Ian Macpherson, 1st Baron Strathcarron (1880–1937), British lawyer and politician
- Ian Macpherson (novelist) (1905–1944), Scottish novelist
- Ian McPherson (footballer) (1920–1983), Scottish footballer
- Ian MacPherson (historian) (1939–2013), Canadian historian and co-operative activist
- Ian McPherson (cricketer) (born 1942), Scottish cricketer
- Ian Macpherson, 3rd Baron Strathcarron (born 1949), British peer, grandson of the 1st Baron
- Ian Macpherson (comedian) (born 1951), Irish comic novelist, playwright and performer
- Ian McPherson (police officer) (born 1961), British police officer
