= Ronald Robertson =

Ronald Robertson may refer to:

- Ronald Robertson (figure skater) (1937–2000), American figure skater
- Ronald Robertson (politician) (1920–1998), politician in Manitoba, Canada
- Ronald Foote Robertson (1920–1991), British physician
