= Neil Gow (disambiguation) =

Neil Gow (1907–1919) was a Thoroughbred race horse.

Neil Gow may refer also to:

- Neil Gow (microbiologist) (born 1957), British microbiologist

== See also ==
- Niel Gow (1727–1807), Scottish musician
