= Ian Abbot =

Scottish poet (1947–1989)

- Ian Abbot
- Born: 1947; Perth, Scotland
- Died: 1989 (aged 41–42); Whitebridge, Scotland
- Known for: Poetry

Ian Robert Hamilton Abbot (1947–1989) was a Scottish poet. A posthumous work of Abbot, Finishing the Picture, was published by Kennedy and Boyd in 2015.

== Life ==
Abbot was the son of a house-painter, Thomas Abbott, and mother Robina Abbot. His brother was Frazer Abbot, a respected painter, and his sister was a nurse. Abbot grew up in a tenement on Ruthven Avenue in the city of Perth and attended the Northern District School. Abbot's family later moved to Rannoch Road in the northwest area of Perth with Abbot moving to Goodlyburn Primary School and later Perth Academy. Abbot left the Academy before completing his examinations to work at Tay Salmon Fisheries Company. During this period, he became increasingly left-wing in his political outlook.

== 1960s ==
In the 1960s, Abbot attended Dundee Commercial College to attain the Highers he needed to attend university. While at the college, Abbot attended the class of the Scottish poet William Montgomerie and it was Montgomerie that ignited Abbot's interest in poetry. After leaving the college, Abbot found employment as a psychiatric nurse at the Royal Edinburgh Hospital. From there, he matriculated at the University of Edinburgh Medical School to read medicine, later moving to University of Stirling to read psychology. Abbot left without a degree, having become disenchanted with academia.

== 1970s ==
In the 1970s, Abbot became a silversmith and moved to Whitebridge to devote himself to writing, but the remoteness of the location meant that orders for work became fewer and the business failed. Abbot took on a large number of low paying jobs to earn enough money to live, such as casual farm work. He worked as a sheep clipper, fencer, tractor driver and pony drover. Other positions that Abbot described in the biographical entry of his Avoiding the Gods included barman, different types of drivers, forestry worker, auditor and interior designer.

Abbot explained during this period that he took these positions to try and support himself while travelling in Africa, according to his Scottish Arts Council bursary application biographical statement, but his aim was to become a full-time writer. Moreover, in a letter to William Montgomerie, Abbot admitted that the idea of risking all on full-time writing scared him.

== 1980s ==
At the start of the 1980s onwards Abbot's poetry started to appear in print. In 1982, he won a prize of £50 that was posted by the Royal Lyceum Theatre for the poem Ariel. In 1985, he won another poetry competition with his poem called Scott’s first voyage, in a competition that was held by the Poetry Association of Scotland. By the mid-1980s, Abbot was touring Scotland where he gave readings and ran workshops in poetry writing. This led the Scottish Arts Council to provide a bursary that enabled him to complete the work on the manuscript Avoiding the Gods. The manuscript was published in 1988 by Chapman Publishing.

== Bibliography ==
- Abbot, Ian (1988). Avoiding the gods. Chapman. p. 64. ISBN 9780906772133.
- Abbot, Ian; McCaffery, Richie (2015). Finishing the picture : collected poems. Edinburgh: Kennedy & Boyd. ISBN 9781849211543.
