= Hipperholme Grammar School =

School in West Yorkshire, England

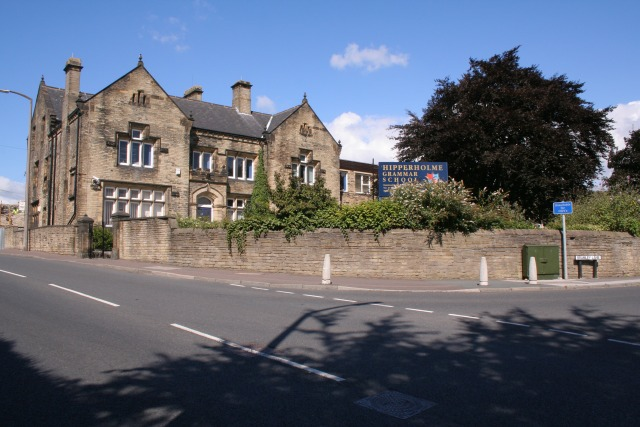

Location
- Bramley Lane; Hipperholme; Halifax, West Yorkshire, HX3 8JE; England; 53°43′43″N 1°48′48″W

Information
- Type: Private school
- Motto: Doctrina Fortior Armis (Latin: The pen is mightier than the sword)
- Religious affiliation: Church of England
- Established: 1648; 378 years ago
- Founders: Matthew Broadley, Joseph Lister, Samuel Sunderland
- Department for Education URN: 107585 Tables
- Chair of Governors: James Allison
- Head Teacher: Tim Bostwick
- Staff: 51
- Gender: Mixed
- Age: 3 to 16
- Enrolment: 371
- Houses: Sunderland, Lister, Broadly and Watkins.
- Colours: Red and blue
- Publication: The Broadleian
- Website: www.hgsf.org.uk

Hipperholme Grammar School is a private grammar school in Hipperholme (near Halifax), West Yorkshire, England. It educates pupils between the ages of 3 and 16.

Lightcliffe Preparatory School merged with Hipperholme Grammar School in 2003, under the Hipperholme Grammar Schools Foundation, and was subsequently renamed as Hipperholme Grammar Junior School. In 2017, the Junior School site in Lightcliffe closed and the Junior School merged with the Senior school site.

In 1648 (the date the school classes as its founding year) Matthew Broadley, paymaster to Charles I, endowed a large sum of money to build a school on land donated by Samuel Sunderland of Coley Hall; the school opened on its current site in 1661. Two of the current school houses, Broadley and Sunderland, are named after the founders.

In 1783 a new school hall was constructed. Originally an all-boys school, it became private (ISA, AGBIS) in the 1980s and began admitting girls at the same time.

== Notable former pupils ==
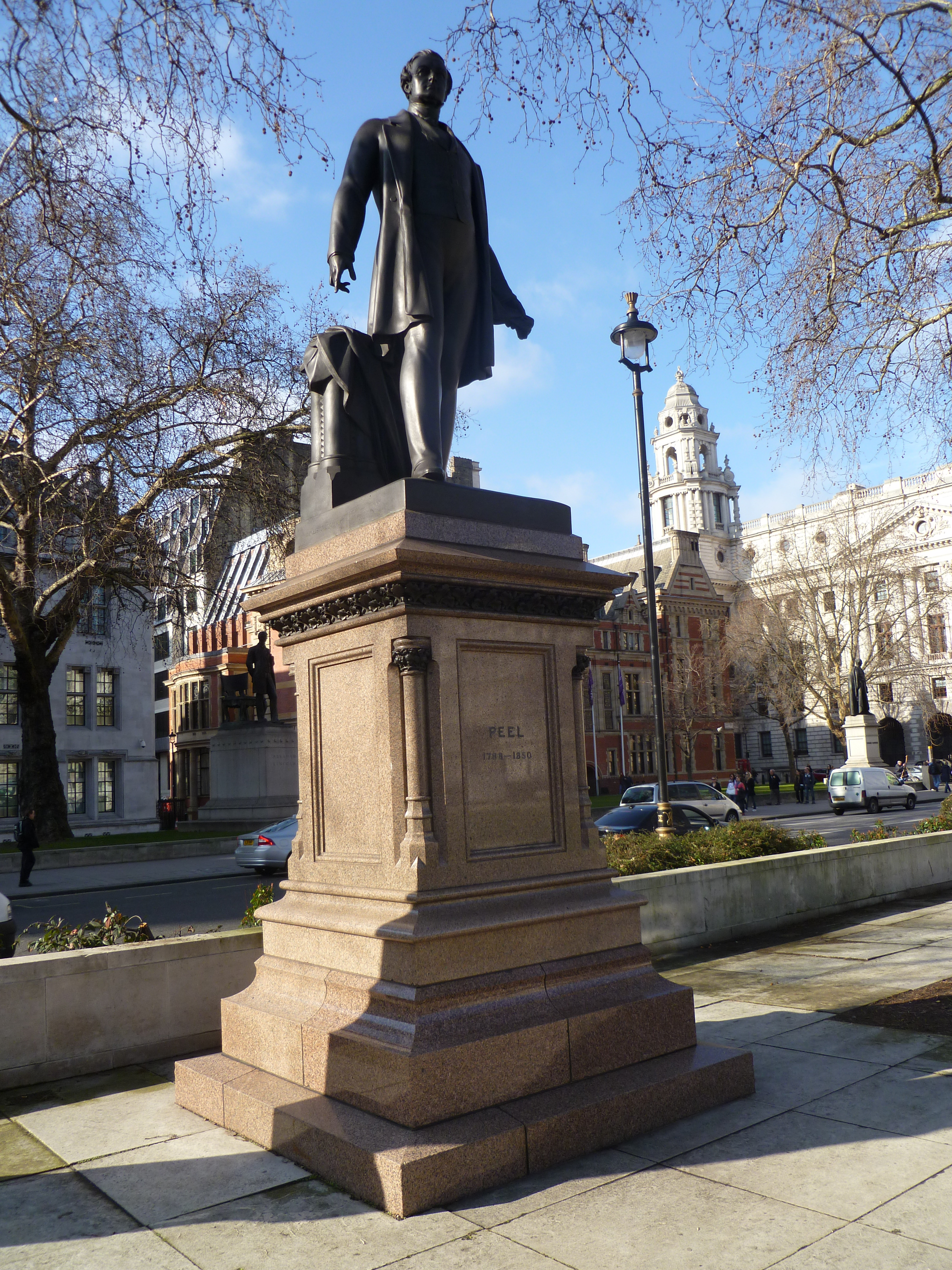
Statue to Sir Robert Peel in London, in February 2012

- Richard Alexander, TV presenter and producer
- Sir Gordon Duff, Principal since 2014 of St Hilda's College, Oxford, and Chairman from 2013–14 of the MHRA
- George Stanley Faber, theologian
- David Halliwell, 1936–2006 Playwright and dramatist, Little Malcolm and His Struggle Against the Eunuchs
- Lawrence Heyworth, radical MP and merchant
- Neil Hopkinson, classical scholar
- John Dyson Hutchinson, Liberal MP from 1877–82
- Courtney Kenny, liberal politician
- Wilf Lunn, prop maker
- Danny McNamara, singer
- Richard McNamara, guitarist
- Katie Ormerod, snowboarder
- Sir Robert Peel, Victorian era Prime Minister and creator of the Metropolitan police
- Percy Sladen, biologist
- Laurence Sterne, Anglo-Irish novelist
- Sir Donald Thompson, Conservative MP from 1979–83 for Sowerby and 1983-97 for Calder Valley
- Paddy Tipping, Nottinghamshire PCC since 2012, and Labour MP from 1991–2012 for Sherwood
