= John Farquhar (Scottish cricketer) =

Scottish cricketer and solicitor

Personal information
- Full name: John Stewart Farquhar
- Born: 8 April 1904; Cargill, Perthshire, Scotland
- Died: 7 March 1984 (aged 79); Dundee, Angus, Scotland
- Batting: Right-handed
- Bowling: Right-arm fast-medium

Domestic team information
- Years: Team
- 1930–1939: Scotland

Career statistics
Competition	First-class
Matches	6
Runs scored	20
Batting average	10.00
100s/50s	–/–
Top score	6*
Balls bowled	1,243
Wickets	22
Bowling average	19.18
5 wickets in innings	–
10 wickets in match	–
Best bowling	4/13
Catches/stumpings	1/–
- Source: Cricinfo, 8 July 2022

John Stewart Farquhar (8 April 1904 — 7 March 1984) was a Scottish first-class cricketer.

Farquhar was born in April 1904 at Cargill, Perthshire. He was educated at the Perth Academy. A club cricketer who played for both Perthshire and Forfarshire Cricket Club's, Farquhar made his debut for Scotland in first-class cricket against Ireland at Aberdeen in 1930. He played first-class cricket for Scotland until 1939, making six appearances; five of these came in the annual match against Ireland, with one coming against the touring Australians in 1934. Playing as a right-arm fast-medium bowler in the Scottish side, Farquhar took 22 wickets at an average of 19.18, with best figures of 4 for 13. Outside of cricket, Farquhar was a haulage contractor who was declared bankrupt in July 1935. He later died at Dundee in March 1984.
