= Joan Knight =

Joan Knight OBE
- Born: 27 September 1924; Walton-le-Dale, Lancashire
- Died: 20 December 1996 (aged 72); Perth, Scotland
- Education: Bristol Old Vic
- Occupation: Theatre director
- Employer: Perth Theatre
- Board member of: Scottish Arts Council
- Awards: DK Thomson Award, Perth Partnership Rosebowl
- Honours: Officer of the Order of the British Empire (OBE)

Joan Knight (27 September 1924 – 20 December 1996) was a British stage manager and director. She worked at the Royal Court Theatre and the Palace Theatre, Watford. She ran the Ludlow Theatre festival for three years. She was artistic director of Perth Theatre, Scotland, from 1968 until her retirement in 1993. During this time, she also served briefly as director of productions of Pitlochry Festival Theatre. She was offered a National Theatre directorship by Laurence Olivier, which she declined. She was a governor of Queen Margaret University College and a board member of Perth College. Known locally as Perth's "Queen of Theatre", she was presented with the DK Thomson Award in 1982 for her outstanding contribution to drama, and the Perth Partnership Rosebowl in 1993. She received an OBE for services to theatre in 1985. She was a council member of the Scottish Arts Council from 1980 to 1986.

== Early life and education ==
Mary Joan Knight was born in Walton-le-Dale, Lancashire, on 27 September 1924 to Mary Cottam and Henry Knight, a market gardener. As a child, she produced plays to entertain her family. She left school at 15 and volunteered for the Women's Land Army. She directed for amateur societies around Preston and achieved a Licentiate of the Royal Academy of Music (LRAM) qualification to teach music. She taught elocution and drama at a girls' school and at an adult education centre. She undertook a one-year course at Bristol Old Vic Theatre School in 1951.

== Career ==
Her first job as a stage manager was at Midland Theatre Company in 1952. She directed plays in English regional theatres and first directed at Perth Theatre in 1957. She directed actor Patrick Stewart as Shylock at the Bristol Old Vic in 1965. She directed The Mousetrap in the West End. In 1966 she produced a children's play in the Edinburgh Festival. She was director of Farnham Repertory Theatre before moving to Perth in 1968 to become artistic director of Perth Theatre.

=== Perth Theatre ===
When she took on the role of artistic director, the theatre was in a poor financial position and she "played it safe" for the first few years. She went on to developed it into one of the most successful theatres in Scotland in terms of attendance and quality of production. She put on 40 new plays at Perth and directed Scotland's first nude actor on stage. She introduced a subscription scheme which boosted audience attendance to 78% of capacity. She persuaded the Gannochy Trust to invest in a multi-million pound upgrade to the building. As part of the 1991 Perth Festival of the Arts, she produced Peace Child, featuring a cast of more than 100 young people from around the world, which ran for nice sell-out performances. She was twice invited to join the National Theatre by Laurence Olivier but she declined. She retired in 1993.

"I have had a wonderful life and have no doubt that my time at Perth Theatre was the happiest in my career." Joan Knight on receiving an honorary degree in 1996

After her retirement, she returned as guest director to Perth Theatre, as well as the Pitlochry Festival Theatre and The Byre, St Andrews.

=== Boards ===
Knight was a member of the Scottish Arts Council from 1980 to 1986. She was a governor of Queen Margaret University College and a board member of Perth College.

== Awards and recognition ==
The DK Thomson Award was given annually to "the person who has done most to further cultural or recreational activities" in Perth and Kinross. In 1982, the award was presented to Knight by the former Lord provost David K Thomson, after whom the award was named. Mr Thomson said Knight had given "an outstanding contribution to the social and artistic life of the Perth and Kinross district" in her role as artistic director of Perth Theatre.

In 1985, Knight received an OBE for services to theatre. In 1987, she was awarded a British Theatre Arts Association fellowship to study theatre in America. She was awarded the Perth Partnership Rosebowl in 1993 for "putting Perth on the map".

She received an honorary degree of Doctor of Letters from Queen Margaret College in Edinburgh in 1996, shortly before she died. She was referred to as "the presiding genius and the jewel in the crown" of Perth Theatre by the college's professor of theatre Clive Perry.

== Death and legacy ==
Knight died of cancer in at her Gannochy home in Perth on 20 December 1996 aged 72. Perth Theatre paid tribute to her by dimming the lights in its foyer and marquee on the evening of her death.

The revamped Perth Theatre named its Joan Knight Studio in her honour in 2017, alongside a commitment to invest in young artistic talent as part of the Joan Knight New Commission Fund.
