= Arthur Dewar (cricketer) =

Scottish cricketer (1934–2020)

Personal information
- Full name: Arthur Dewar
- Born: 15 March 1934; Perth, Perthshire, Scotland
- Died: 10 January 2020 (aged 85); Perth, Perthshire, Scotland
- Batting: Right-handed
- Bowling: Right-arm fast-medium

Domestic team information
- Years: Team
- 1960–1962: Scotland

Career statistics
Competition	First-class
Matches	5
Runs scored	15
Batting average	5.00
100s/50s	–/–
Top score	4*
Balls bowled	713
Wickets	11
Bowling average	33.27
5 wickets in innings	1
10 wickets in match	–
Best bowling	7/71
Catches/stumpings	1/–
- Source: Cricinfo, 19 July 2022

Arthur Dewar (15 March 1934 — 10 January 2020) was a Scottish first-class cricketer.

Dewar was born in March 1934 at Perth, where he was educated at the Perth Academy. A club cricketer for Perthshire Cricket Club, Dewar made his debut for Scotland in first-class cricket against Ireland at Paisley in 1960. His second match against Warwickshire at Edgbaston bought him considerable success, with him taking bowling figures of 7 for 71 in Warwickshire's first innings; amongst his wickets were the Test cricketers Khalid Ibadulla and Tom Cartwright. He appeared in two further first-class matches in 1961, against the Marylebone Cricket Club and Ireland, before making a fifth and final appearance in 1962 against Warwickshire. Besides his 7 for 71 against Warwickshire in 1961, Dewar struggled to have an impact with the ball in the matches which followed, taking just 3 more wickets. In his five first-class matches, he took 11 wickets at an average of 33.27. Dewar died at Perth in January 2020.
