= Neil Hopkinson =

English classical scholar (1957–2021)

- Born: 13 March 1957; Elland, West Riding of Yorkshire
- Died: 5 January 2021 (aged 63)

Academic background
- Education: Peterhouse, Cambridge
- Influences: A. S. F. Gow

Academic work
- Discipline: Classics
- Sub-discipline: Ancient Greek literature
- Institutions: Trinity College, Cambridge

Neil Hopkinson (13 March 1957 – 5 January 2021) was an English Hellenist. Educated at Peterhouse, Cambridge, he served as a fellow and director of studies in Classics at Trinity College, Cambridge from 1983 until his death in 2021. He has been described as "one of the most influential commentators of his generation".

Hopkinson was an expert on Ancient Greek literature of the Hellenistic period and under the Roman Empire. After a commentary on the Hymn to Demeter by Callimachus (1984) established his scholarly reputation, he went on to publish widely in his field. His publications include a critical edition of the Dionysiaca of Nonnus (1994) and commentaries on Ovid's Metamorphoses (2000) and on selected works of Lucian (2008).

== Life and career ==
Neil Hopkinson was born on 13 March 1957 in Elland, a town south of Halifax, West Riding of Yorkshire. He was educated at Hipperholme Grammar School and in 1976 began studying Classics at Peterhouse, Cambridge, where he was both an undergraduate and a postgraduate student. From 1982 to 1983, he worked at the same college as a research fellow.

In 1983, Hopkinson was appointed fellow and director of studies in Classics at Trinity College, Cambridge. He held these positions for the rest of his life. Modelling his fellowship on that of the former Trinity classicist A. S. F. Gow, he was noted for the social gatherings he organised for students of the college, such as an annual reading holiday to his home county of West Yorkshire and events known as "desserts", where only dessert was served. On 5 January 2021, Hopkinson died after briefly suffering from myeloma.

== Work ==
Hopkinson was an expert on Ancient Greek literature of the Hellenistic period and under Roman Empire. His first major publication was an edition of the Hymn to Demeter by the Alexandrian poet Callimachus (1984), which was still considered the standard work on this text at the time of his death. His publications also included a critical edition of the Dionysiaca of Nonnus (1994), commentaries on Book 13 of Ovid's Metamorphoses (2000), and on selected works of Lucian (2008).

His work on classical literature placed him among the leading Hellenists of his generation. The classicist Richard L. Hunter said that Hopkinson's knowledge of the classical languages was "unsurpassed"; by contrast, the Latinist Philip Hardie termed his commentary on the Hymn to Demeter as "a masterpiece of deep and judicious scholarship". A 2021 obituary published in The Times quoted a fellow classicist describing him as "one of the most influential commentators of his generation".

== Selected publications ==
- Callimachus (1984). Callimachus: Hymn to Demeter. Cambridge. ISBN 978-0-521-60436-9.
- Hopkinson, Neil (1988). A Hellenistic anthology. Cambridge. ISBN 978-0-521-31425-1.
- Nonnos; Panopolis, Nonnos de; Vian, Francis; Hopkinson, Neil (1994). Nonnos de Panopolis: Les Dionysiaques: Tome VIII: Chants XX-XXIV. Paris. ISBN 978-2-251-00440-2.
- Hopkinson, Neil (1994). Greek Poetry of the Imperial Period: An Anthology. Cambridge. ISBN 978-0-521-42313-7.
- Ovid; Naso, Publius Ovidius (2000). Ovid: Metamorphoses: Book 13. Cambridge. ISBN 978-0-521-55620-0.
- Lucian (2008). Lucian: A Selection. Cambridge. ISBN 978-0-521-60304-1.
- Theocritus; Moschus (2015). Theocritus. Moschus. Bion. Cambridge, MA. ISBN 978-0-674-99644-1.
- Quintus Smyrnaeus. Posthomerica. ed. and trans. by Neil Hopkinson. Loeb edition, Harvard University Press 2018.

== Bibliography ==
- Anderson, William S. (2001). "Review of Metamorphoses XIII, ed. Neil Hopkinson". The Classical Review. 51. doi:10.1093/cr/51.2.255.
- Griffiths, Alan (1988). "Review of: Callimachus, Hymn to Demeter, ed. Neil Hopkinson". Journal of Hellenic Studies. 108: 230–4. doi:10.2307/632665. JSTOR 632665.
- Möllendorff, Peter von (2011). "Review of Lucian. A Selection, ed. Neil Hopkinson". Mnemosyne. 64: 673–6. doi:10.1163/156852511X548324.
