= Robert McLaren (cricketer) =

Scottish cricketer and soldier

Personal information
- Full name: Robert Stewart McLaren
- Born: 10 May 1919; Perth, Perthshire, Scotland
- Died: 20 August 2006 (aged 87); Torquay, Devon, England
- Batting: Right-handed
- Role: Wicket-keeper

Domestic team information
- Years: Team
- 1947–1949: Scotland

Career statistics
Competition	First-class
Matches	6
Runs scored	23
Batting average	2.87
100s/50s	–/–
Top score	7
Catches/stumpings	6/7
- Source: Cricinfo, 26 July 2022

Robert Stewart McLaren (10 May 1919 — 20 August 2006) was a Scottish first-class cricketer and British Army officer.

McLaren was born at Perth in May 1919, where he was educated at Perth Academy. During the Second World War, McLaren was commissioned as a second lieutenant in the Black Watch in February 1943. A club cricketer for Carlton Cricket Club, he made his debut for Scotland in first-class cricket against Warwickshire on Scotland's 1947 tour of England. He played first-class cricket for Scotland until 1949, making six appearances. Playing as a wicket-keeper in the Scotland team, he took 6 catches and made 7 stumpings. A true tailend batsman, he scored 23 runs at an average of 2.87. He joined Dunfermline Cricket Club in November 1953. Outside of cricket, he worked firstly as a bank clerk, before becoming the manager of a steel plant. McLaren died in England at Torquay in August 2006.
