= Graham Gooday =

British molecular biologist

Graham Gooday FRSE
- Born: Graham William Gooday; 19 February 1942
- Died: 10 October 2001 (aged 59)
- Education: University of Bristol (BSc, PhD)
- Children: 3
- Awards: Fleming Prize Lecture 1976; FRSE 1989
- Scientific career
- Workplaces: University of Aberdeen; University of Leeds
- Thesis: Sexual reproduction in the Mucorales (1968)
- Doctoral students: Neil Gow

Graham William Gooday FRSE (1942–2001) was a British molecular biologist. He was Professor of Microbiology at Aberdeen University. He was presented with the inaugural Fleming Prize Lecture for the Microbiological Society in 1976. He served as Director of the Institute of Marine Biology.

== Early life and education ==
Gooday was born on 19 February 1942 in Colchester the son of William Arnold Gooday and Edith May Beeton. He studied Biology at the University of Bristol graduating BSc in 1963. He took a year out working as a teacher for Voluntary Service Overseas (VSO) in Kenema in Sierra Leone. He received a PhD in 1968 from the University of Bristol for research on sexual reproduction in the Mucorales. He returned as a research fellow at the University of Leeds working with Irene Manton and then at University of Glasgow worked with John Burnett.

== Career and research ==
Gooday served as a lecturer at Aberdeen University from 1972 and was promoted to Professor in 1986.

His research focused on the fungal cell wall, in particular to the biochemistry and physiology of chitin biosynthesis and degradation. He also contributed to pheromone signalling in zygomycetes and yeast-hypha dimorphism in Candida.

=== Publications ===
Gooday was the author or co-author over 200 publications, including several books. Among the most significant are:

- Differentiation in the Mucaroles (1973)
- Fungal Sex Hormones (1974)
- Chitin in Nature and Technology (1975)
- Functions of Trisporic Acid (1978)
- Microbial Polysaccharides and Polysaccharases (1979)

=== Awards and honours ===
He was the first recipient of the Fleming Prize Lecture award from the (then) Society of General Microbiology in 1976, made to early career researchers who had produced significant work within 12 years of gaining their doctoral degree.

In 1989 he was elected a Fellow of the Royal Society of Edinburgh. His proposers were John M. Kosterlitz, J H Burnett, J E Fothergill, James Mackay Shewan, C H Gimmingham, F W Robertson, George Dunnet and Patrick Thomas Grant.

In 1993 he was President of the British Mycology Society.

== Personal life ==
He was married with three children.
