= Condie Sandeman =

Scottish advocate (1866-1933)

James Condie Stewart Sandeman (1866 – 11 November 1933) was a Scottish advocate.

== Biography ==
He was the son of Colonel Frank Stewart Sandeman of Stanley, Perthshire, by his wife Laura, daughter of James Condie WS, of Perth; Dr Laura Stewart Sandeman was his elder sister and Sir Nairne Stewart Sandeman his younger brother. He was educated at Perth Academy and the University of Edinburgh, and called to the Scottish Bar in 1889. He was made a King's Counsel in 1909 and became Dean of the Faculty of Advocates, and Sheriff of Perth in 1920.

Sandeman married Sarah, daughter of George Rhind, a sculptor of Edinburgh, by whom he had two sons; they lived at 11 India Street, Edinburgh. Sandeman listed his recreations in Who's Who as fishing and golf, and was a member of the Royal Automobile Club, the University Club of Edinburgh, the Royal and Ancient Golf Club of St Andrews and the Honourable Company of Edinburgh Golfers.
