= Mary Packer Harris =

Scottish artist and art teacher (1891–1978)

- Born: Mary Packer Harris; 30 July 1891; Middlesbrough, Yorkshire, England
- Died: 26 August 1978 (aged 87)
- Education: Edinburgh College of Art
- Known for: Painting, printmaking, embroidery, tapestry, teaching
- Notable work: Art, the Torch of Life (1946)
- Elected: Royal SA Society of Arts (1922–67)

Mary Packer Harris D.A. (Edin.) (30 July 1891 – 26 August 1978) was a Scottish artist and art teacher with a considerable career in South Australia.

== Early life and training ==
Mary was born in Middlesbrough, Yorkshire the only daughter of musician and beekeeper Clement Antrobus Harris (c. 1862 – 12 February 1942) and his wife Mary Elizabeth Harris ( – 14 February 1937). Educated in Scotland she attended Morrison's Academy and Perth Academy before graduating with a diploma from the Edinburgh College of Art. In 1913 she did a post-graduate course in woodblock printing with F. Morley Fletcher, director of the College. She trained as a teacher with the Scottish Education Department and taught at Buckie, Banffshire, Scotland, then from 1918 at the Ayr Academy.

== South Australia ==
An elder brother, Antrobus, was killed in the Flanders trenches in 1916. Another brother, John Brocas Harris ( –1967) had earlier emigrated to South Australia, served at Gallipoli with the Army Medical Corps and was badly wounded. He married Gwendoline Mary Colyer ( –1959) in 1917, and settled in Gawler, where he was a noted horticulturist and horticultural inspector at Gawler, and later at the Government orchard, Blackwood. His eldest son Dr. Ian Harris born 12 February 1920 was awarded DSC for navy heroism. In response to his urging, Mary and her parents emigrated in 1921. In 1922 she accepted a position with the SA School of Arts and Crafts, where she was to teach for 30 years in a wide range of mediums: oil and watercolor, lino and woodblock printing, tapestry and embroidery.

Harris was a longtime member of the Royal SA Society of Arts (1922–67) and also exhibited with the Contemporary Art Society. Fellow teachers included her friend Ruth Tuck. Students included Rex Wood, Jacqueline Hick and John Olday. She lived at "Bundilla", 116 Walkerville Terrace, Walkerville, which she filled with her own and her students' art, and with a lovingly tended native bird garden punctuated with sculptures by William Ricketts and her nephew Quintin Gilbert Harris (1928–1985), son of J. B. Harris (above). Her bequest of this home to the Town of Walkerville was declined, but the Council did accept the many works of art, including sculptures by her friend Ola Cohn. She was a leading member of Adelaide's Lyceum Club.

== Personal life ==
Harris was a member of the Society of Friends, worshipping at the Friends Meeting House, North Adelaide. In common with a great number of Quakers she was active in the peace movement, and was a vegetarian.

== Exhibitions ==
- Her first one-woman show was held in March 1927 at the Society of Arts' gallery at the Institute building, North Terrace, which brought her versatility to public attention.
- "The Testament of Beauty" with nine of her students, including Ivor Francis and David Dallwitz in November 1939 was held at the Australian Art Gallery, Rundle Street. The exhibition's title comes from a poem by Robert Bridges.
- A one-woman show in April 1946 attracted a predominantly female audience.
- A retrospective exhibition of her work was held in 1986

== Collections ==
- Many of her works are held by the Town of Walkerville
- Several of her woodcut and linocut prints are held by the Ballarat Fine Art Gallery
- The Art Gallery of South Australia has one item: an embroidered firescreen The Indian upon God, carved frame by Edwin Newsham (1891–1989).

== Publications ==
Harris was a prolific writer; her Art, the Torch of Life was published by Rigby, Ltd. in 1946 and much else is held by the State Library of South Australia in manuscript or typescript form.

- The Skyline, a one act play in four scenes written after the death of her brother in Flanders during World War I.
- Harris, Mary Packer (1971), In One Splendour Spun : autobiography of a Quaker artist, M.P. Harris
- Harris, Mary Packer (1948), The Cosmic Rhythm of Art and Literature (aka Art the Torch of Life), Cork
