= Jack Shaw (accountant) =

Scottish businessman (1932–2021)

Sir John Calman Shaw CBE, FRSE
- Born: 10 June 1932
- Died: 5 April 2021 (aged 88); Edinburgh
- Occupation: Businessman

Sir John Calman Shaw CBE FRSE (10 July 1932 – 5 April 2021) was a Scottish businessman, chairman of the board of directors and Governor of the Bank of Scotland from 1999–2001, deputy governor from 1991–1999 and a non-executive director from 1990–2001.

== Education ==
Shaw was born in Perth and educated at Perth Academy and Strathallan School in Perthshire, Scotland. On leaving Strathallan, he took up an apprenticeship with a well-known firm of accountants in Edinburgh called Graham, Smart & Annan (GSA). In 1953 he graduated from the University of Edinburgh with a law degree and qualified as a chartered accountant in 1954. Shaw completed his National Service with the Royal Air Force between 1954 and 1956 as a pilot officer in Fighter Control based in Germany.

In 1958, on the advice of GSA, Shaw spent two years working in the offices of Thomson McLintock & Company in London to give him experience working outwith Edinburgh. Working with the firm in London enabled Shaw to complete the practical experience component required to qualify as a member of the Chartered Institute of Management Accountants whose exams he had passed prior to serving his National Service.

== Career ==
In 1960 Shaw returned to Edinburgh and became a junior partner in GSA. He worked on several high-profile audits including the acquisition of Crawford's by McVitie & Price to become United Biscuits and an investigation for the White Fish Authority. Shaw also worked on a project inspired by Professor Browning at the University of Glasgow to explore the creation of a Scottish Computer Education and Applied Research Centre (SCEARC) for education and research in the application of computers to financial management.

Over many years GSA had developed close relations with several comparable firms throughout the United Kingdom. Many of those firms, including GSA, sought to gain national coverage by merging. Throughout the sixties, GSA had a close relationship with the London-based Deloitte, Plender, Griffiths & Co (Deloittes) and in 1973 the two firms merged. Deloittes were merging with several firms in the UK, and soon had over two hundred partners, thirteen of them in Edinburgh.

Whilst working with Deloittes, Shaw lectured part-time at Heriot-Watt University and the University of Edinburgh before accepting the part-time position of Johnstone Smith Professor of Accountancy at the University of Glasgow from 1977–1983. In 1980 he was appointed a local senior partner in Deloitte's Edinburgh office. In 1983 he was appointed president of the Institute of Chartered Accountants of Scotland for a one-year term. In 1986 he retired from Deloittes in Edinburgh to accept a position with Scottish Financial Enterprise.

In 1986, Shaw was appointed the first executive director of Scottish Financial Enterprise, an effort funded by Scottish banks to promote Scotland's financial services industry. Although initially reluctant, the insurance companies and fund managers became members. Collectively, the objective was to ensure that companies outwith Scotland were aware of the benefits of using their services.

In 1990, Shaw joined the Bank of Scotland as a non-executive director and in 1991 he became deputy governor. In 1996 Shaw and the Board oversaw the dilution of Standard Life's 33% shareholding in the Bank to other investors. Three years later the Bank had to cancel a deal with Pat Robertson, the evangelical preacher, owing to his controversial views. (Shaw returned to Scottish Financial Enterprise as chairman from 1995 to 1999).

Towards the end of 1999, Shaw became Governor of the Bank and immediately oversaw an unsuccessful takeover bid for the National Westminster Bank. The Bank remained determined to merge with a suitable rival and on 4 May 2001 the Bank of Scotland and the Halifax bank agreed terms on a £30 billion merger.

In September 2001, the new holding company HBOS was established with corporate headquarters in Edinburgh and operational headquarters in Halifax, West Yorkshire. Later that year Shaw stepped down from his position at the Bank of Scotland and was replaced by Sir Peter Burt.

=== Other Appointments ===
At various times he also held a number of additional positions: director of the Scottish American Investment Company; director of Scottish Mortgage and Trust PLC from 1982 to 2001, a member of the Universities Funding Council of Great Britain and a member of the Higher Education Funding Council for England. While at the Bank of Scotland, Shaw was also chairman of Scottish Financial Enterprise (1995–1999), of the Scottish Funding Council (1992–1998), of the Scottish American Investment Company (1991–2001), the US Smaller Companies Investment Trust (1991–1999, the TR European Growth Trust PLC (1998–2002), the Scottish Science Trust (1998–2002), the Edinburgh Technology Fund (1999–2001), the David Hume Institute from 1995–2002 and chairman of the Advanced Management Programme in Scotland (1995–2005). He was also deputy chairman of the Edinburgh International Festival Society (1990–2000).

Shaw was also a director of Scottish Metropolitan Property PLC from 1994 to 2000, of Templeton Emerging Markets Investment Trust PLC (1994–2003) and of the Scottish Chamber Orchestra. He was a member of the board of Scottish Enterprise (1990 to 1998), and of the Financial Reporting Council (1990–1996). Shaw was a member of the Scottish Economic Council (1996 to 1998), of the University Court of the University of Edinburgh (1998–2003) and Receiver General of the Priory of Scotland Order of St John of Jerusalem (1992–2002)

=== Death ===
Jack Shaw and his wife Shirley had retired to Dunkeld in Perthshire, but his health declined and the couple moved back to Edinburgh where he was in a care home in Cramond for the later part of his life. He died on 5 April 2021.

== Bibliography ==
Shaw wrote three books that were published and several articles in journals such as The Accountant, Accountancy and Accounting and Business Research.

- Bogie, David; Shaw, John (1973). Bogie on Group Accounts, 3rd edition. Jordan & Sons. ISBN 0853080348.
- Shaw, John (1980). The Audit Report: what it says and what it means. Gee Publishing Limited. ISBN 085258203X.
- Gray, S; MacSweeney, L; Shaw, J (1984). Information disclosure and the multinational corporation. Wiley. ISBN 0471904244. OCLC 237675668.

== Honours ==
- Appointed a Commander of the Order of the British Empire, 1989.
- Appointed a Knight Bachelor, 1994.
- Fellowship of the Royal Society of Edinburgh.
- Honorary degree from University of Edinburgh, 1998.
- Honorary degree from University of Glasgow, 1998.
- Honorary degree from University of Abertay, Dundee, 1998.
- Honorary degree from University of St Andrews, 1999.
- Honorary degree from Napier University, 1999.
