= Stanley Bergin =

Cricket information
- Batting: Left-handed

International information
- National side: Ireland

Career statistics
Competition	First-class
Matches	27
Runs scored	1,610
Batting average	34.25
100s/50s	2/9
Top score	137
Catches/stumpings	6/0
- Source: CricketArchive, 16 August 2022

Stanley Francis Bergin (18 December 1926 – 4 August 1969) was an Irish cricketer.

A left-handed batsman, he made his debut for Ireland against Yorkshire in July 1949. He went on to play for Ireland on 53 occasions, his last match coming against Hampshire in September 1965. 27 of his matches for Ireland had first-class status. Bergin opened the batting for Ireland over a period of sixteen years. He played 53 matches, with 98 innings, 7 not outs, scoring 2524 runs at an average of 27.74, he got fifteen 50's, two 100's and 17 catches. He played for Pembroke CC and Ireland.

One of a family of seven boys, Stanley was educated at Westland Row CBS. He played football and hurling for the school and represented Leinster at college level. He was also a top junior-soccer player and played fullback for Monkstown in rugby's Leinster Senior Cup. He also played golf, with a handicap of 15, and competed in league-level table tennis. Cricket, however, remained his main sporting focus.

He joined Pembroke CC, for whom his brother Bernard opened the batting. Bernard won two caps for Ireland against the 1937 New Zealanders, when the three-day match ended in one day. Two other brothers, Augustine (Railway Union) and Gerard (Pembroke) also played senior cricket.

Stanley was fourteen when he made his first XI debut in a side sporting several internationals including the William brothers. A small, wiry batsmen who wore glasses, Bergin was particularly strong square of the wicket, with concentration a notable aspect of his game. This was evident against the 1951 South Africans, who fielded Cuan McCarthy, the fastest bowler in the world at the time. Ireland lost by an innings, but Bergin batted through the second innings for an unbeaten 79 (out of the team's 130) - the last time an Irish batsman has done so. He was similarly dogged in batting for six hours against Leicestershire in 1959 for innings of 31 and 23. Among his other notable feats for Ireland were four consecutive fifties in 1950–51.

He made 7,713 runs with Pembroke before he retired from cricket altogether in 1965. His career average of 36.9 was the highest at the time of his retirement and remains within the top ten all-time LCU batsmen. He won the Marchant Cup for the province's leading batsmen on four occasions and achieved league and cup doubles with Pembroke in 1944, 1946, 1954 and 1957, the last as captain. He made eight centuries for Pembroke, the first an unbeaten 101 against Merrion at the age of sixteen.

A journalist by trade, he was cricket correspondent for The Irish Times and the Evening Herald, and also wrote about Gaelic Games. In those days of 'The Ban', his name used to appear in cricket scorecards as 'B Stanley'. In 1960, he received a cricket ban for accepting an individual award from Caltex, the forerunner of the Texaco awards. Since then only Dermott Monteith (1971 and 1973) and Ed Joyce (2005) have won the award.

His two centuries for Ireland came against Scotland in 1959 and 1961, while he also made 69 and 63* against Yorkshire in 1959. The 1961 hundred came in Cork, where he took more than six hours. It took him half an hour to get from 92 to 96 but then began slashing wildly and was dropped twice. He never made a century at Lord's, but recorded scores of 88 in 1963 and 78 in 1965. His last game for Ireland was in September 1965 at Clontarf, close to where he lived. After his death, several of his sons continued playing cricket in Castle Avenue and Brendan represented North Leinster in the 1980s.
