= George Mathewson =

Scottish businessman

Sir George Mathewson
- Born: George Ross Mathewson; 14 May 1940 (age 86); Dunfermline, Fife, Scotland
- Education: University of St Andrews
- Known for: Transformation of RBS

Sir George Ross Mathewson, CBE FCIBS FRSE (born 14 May 1940) is a Scottish businessman. He is best known for transforming the Scottish bank The Royal Bank of Scotland from a struggling regional player into a quasi global bank with parallels to Citigroup or HSBC. He was described by the Sunday Herald, as "banking's answer to Bruce Springsteen".

He was the convener of Scotland's Council of Economic Advisers.

== Early life and education ==
Mathewson was born in Dunfermline, the son of George Mathewson, an electrical engineer from Perth, and Charlotte Gordon Ross. He was educated at Perth Academy and the University of St Andrews' Queen's College in Dundee, from where he graduated in 1961 with a degree in mathematics and applied physics.

== Career ==
=== Early career ===
Mathewson started his career as a lecturer at St Andrews University where he did a PhD, before moving to United States to work for Bell Aerospace as an engineer in Buffalo, New York (1967–72). He was attracted back to Scotland by the opening up of the North Sea to oil exploration and joined venture capital group 3i, then called Industrial and Commercial Finance Corporation (1972–81). He was chief executive of the state-funded economic regeneration organisation the Scottish Development Agency (now called Scottish Enterprise) from 1981 to 1987.

=== Royal Bank of Scotland (1987–2000) ===
Mathewson joined the Royal Bank of Scotland, which is headquartered in the Scottish capital city of Edinburgh, in 1987 as director of strategic planning and development. When Mathewson became RBS's chief executive in 1992 the bank had been severely weakened by bad debts arising from poor lending decisions. To get the bank onto an even keel, Mathewson commissioned 'Project Columbus', which transformed the processes and structure of RBS's UK retail banking operations and included a tightening of credit controls, a focus on sales and a modernisation of processes and management.

The defining moment of Mathewson's career came with the £21 billion takeover of the much larger UK bank National Westminster Bank in February 2000. Soon after the NatWest acquisition, Mathewson stepped down as RBS's CEO, handing the reins to his deputy Fred Goodwin, who assumed responsibility for integrating NatWest. Mathewson became deputy chairman in 2000 and chairman in 2001. He stood down in 2006.

== Honours ==
Mathewson was appointed a Commander of the Order of the British Empire (CBE) in the 1985 New Year Honours. He was knighted in the 1999 New Year Honours for services to economic development in Scotland and banking.

== Personal life ==
In 1966, Mathewson married Sheila Alexandra Graham Bennett, daughter of Eon Bennett, and has two sons. She died in 2023.
