= Gordon Duff =

British medical scientist and academic

Sir Gordon Duff FRCP FMedSci FRSE

Principal of St Hilda's College, Oxford
- In office 2014–2021
- Preceded by: Sheila Forbes
- Succeeded by: Sarah Springman

Personal details
- Born: Gordon William Duff; 27 December 1947 (age 78)
- Spouse: Naida Margaret (m. 1969)
- Children: Two
- Education: Perth Academy; Hipperholme Grammar School
- Alma mater: St Peter's College, Oxford; University of London

Sir Gordon William Duff, FRCP, FMedSci, FRSE (born 27 December 1947) is a British medical scientist and academic. He was principal of St Hilda's College, Oxford, from 2014 to 2021. He was Lord Florey Professor of Molecular Medicine at the University of Sheffield from 1991 to 2014.

== Early life and education ==
Sir Gordon was born on 27 December 1947. He was educated at Perth Academy, then a state grammar school in Perth, Scotland, and at Hipperholme Grammar School, a school in Hipperholme, Yorkshire, England. He studied medicine at St Peter's College, Oxford, graduating with a Bachelor of Arts (BA) degree in 1969 and Bachelor of Medicine and Bachelor of Surgery (BM BCh) degrees in 1975: as per tradition, his BA was promoted to a Master of Arts (MA Oxon) degree in 1975.

He undertook postgraduate research in neuropharmacology at St Thomas's Hospital Medical School, University of London, completing his Doctor of Philosophy (PhD) degree in 1980. His doctoral thesis was titled "Some observations on body temperature regulation in the rabbit". Following postgraduate training at the Royal Postgraduate Medical School, Hammersmith Hospital, he held junior faculty posts at Yale Medical School (Infectious Diseases and Pathology department), and the Howard Hughes Institute of Molecular Immunology at Yale.

== Career ==
From 1975 to 1976, Sir Gordon was a house officer in medicine at St Thomas' Hospital, London, and in surgery at Stracathro Hospital, Angus, Scotland.

He joined Edinburgh Medical School in 1984, heading the Molecular Immunology Group, and in 1990 became the inaugural Florey Professor of Medicine at the University of Sheffield, where he went on to become Faculty Research Dean, Member of the University Council, and Director of the Division of Genomic Medicine.

From January 2013 to 2014, he served as the Chairman of the Medicines and Healthcare products Regulatory Agency. He stepped down in 2014, and was succeeded by Sir Michael Rawlins.

Sir Gordon was the Principal of St Hilda's College, Oxford, from 2014 to 2021. He was the first male head of the formerly all-female college. Since 1 July 2015, he has also been the Chair of the Biotechnology and Biological Sciences Research Council (BBSRC). Sir Gordon has served as a Pro-Vice Chancellor of the University of Oxford, as Board Member of Oxford University's Medical Sciences Division, and is an Honorary Fellow of both St Peter's College and St Hilda's College, Oxford.

He is a Board member of the UK's Foundation for Science and Technology, the Advisory Board of Penn University's Institute For Translational Medicine and Therapeutics (ITMAT), and the Translational Medicine Board at University of British Columbia, Vancouver.

Sir Gordon is now President of the "United In Diversity Foundation", which is focused on implementing the UN's Sustainable Development Goals; a Senior Research Fellow of Nuffield Orthopaedic Centre (Oxford Medical School), co-founder of Sitokine Ltd, and Chair of the International Scientific Advisory Board of Silence Therapeutics.

== Honours and awards ==
In 1999, Duff was elected a Fellow of the Academy of Medical Sciences (FMedSci). In 2008, he was elected a Fellow of the Royal Society of Edinburgh (FRSE). On 17 July 2017, he was awarded an honorary degree by the University of Sheffield.

In the 2007 New Year Honours, he was appointed a Knight Bachelor, and therefore granted the title Sir, "for services to Public Health". This was in recognition of his inquiry into, and report on, the conduct of a Theralizumab clinical trial at Northwick Park Hospital in March 2006.

Sir Gordon was listed in the Science Council’s “Top 100 working scientists in the UK” in 2014. In 2016 he was awarded the Sir James Black Award from the British Pharmacological Society for his paper on “The Original Identification of Tumour Necrosis Factor (TNF) as a Therapeutic Target in Human Arthritis”.

He is a former President of the International Cytokine Society and has received honorary doctorates from the Universities of Edinburgh and Sheffield. He was a co-founding editor of the international research journal ‘SITOKINE’, and advisory editor to the Human Genome Organisation (HUGO) Journal. His identification of the term “cytokine storm” has led to its widespread use when discussing adverse side-effects of influenza-like diseases including COVID-19.

He has given the Croonian Lecture at the Royal College of Physicians of London, the Weatherall Lecture at the University of Oxford, the Harry Bostrom Medal Lecture at Karolinska Institute, and the Faculty Lecture at University of Geneva.

Sir Gordon has lectured extensively at international universities, professional societies and government agencies, including National Institutes of Health (USA), the US Food & Drug Administration, the National Cancer Institute (USA), Institut Pasteur (France), Biopolis (Singapore), the Paul Ehrlich Institute (Germany), the Sanger Centre (Cambridge, UK), and Trinity College, Dublin (Ireland).

== Advisory and leadership roles ==
Sir Gordon has served on many scientific advisory boards and funding panels in the UK, EU and US, including on Government Foresight Groups for the Medical Research Council and the Engineering and Physical Sciences Research Council, and the Wellcome Trust in the UK.

Previously chair of the UK’s Committee on Safety of Medicines (and of its Biological and Vaccines Sub-Committee), he was inaugural chair of the UK's Commission on Human Medicines (CHM, 2005-2012) before becoming chair of the Medicines and Healthcare products Regulatory Agency (the national regulator of all UK medicines and medical devices).

Sir Gordon was chair of the Secretary-of-State's "Expert Scientific Group on Phase One Clinical Trials" following the Northwick Park clinical trial disaster in 2006 involving the drug TGN1412; the report made 22 recommendations to improve the safety of “first-in-human” clinical trials.

From 2002 to 2009 he was chair of the UK's National Biological Standards Board, overseeing the National Institute for Biological Standards and Control (NIBSC, WHO Centre); his responsibilities including setting up the National Stem Cell Bank, vCJD reagent repository and supplying about 95% of the world's biological standards for diagnostics, biological medicines and vaccines.

He was an advisor on biological medicines to the EU, and was chair of the UK's Scientific Pandemic Influenza (SPI) Advisory Committee from 2006-2010. In 2009-2010 he co-chaired the UK government's Scientific Advisory Group for Emergencies (SAGE) to tackle the H1N1 swine flu pandemic; during his tenure he presided over the accelerated procurement and distribution of antivirals, the approval of a specific vaccine, and the establishment of a clinical data group. In 2010 he reviewed the UK's Organ Donor Register, correcting various coding errors to improve reliability.

From 2015 to 2019, Sir Gordon was chair of the UK's Biotechnology and Biological Sciences Research Council (BBSRC) during the launch of the new Pirbright Institute for Animal Health. He chaired the Academic Health Science Centres of Imperial College London (2012-2016) and Trinity College, Dublin (2013-2020), and the MRC/NIHR National Phenome Centre at Imperial.

== Publications ==
With interests in inflammation, immunology, cytokines, therapeutics, biomedicine, public health and genetics, Sir Gordon has published over 400 research articles and government reports on medicines, vaccines and public health. He is co-inventor of around 35 biotech and diagnostic patents.

== Personal life ==
In 1969, Duff married Naida Margaret Clarke, the daughter of Air Commodore Charles Clarke and Eileen Clarke. They have two daughters.

== Selected works ==
A fuller bibliography can be found here: https://scholar.google.co.uk/citations?user=RPEVbnQAAAAJ&hl=en

- Wilson, A. G.; di Giovine, F. S.; Blakemore, A. I. F.; Duff, G. W. (1992). "Single base polymorphism in the human Tumour Necrosis Factor alpha (TNFa) gene detectable by Nco1 restriction of PCR product". Human Molecular Genetics. 1 (5): 353. doi:10.1093/hmg/1.5.353. PMID 1363876.
- Wilson, A. G.; Symons, J. A.; McDowell, T. L.; McDevitt, H. O.; Duff, G. W. (1997). "Effects of a polymorphism in the human tumor necrosis factor alpha promoter on transcriptional activation". Proceedings of the National Academy of Sciences of the United States of America. 94 (7): 3195–9. Bibcode:1997PNAS...94.3195W. doi:10.1073/pnas.94.7.3195. PMC 20345. PMID 9096369.
- Kornman, Kenneth S.; Crane, Allison; Wang, Hwa-Ying; di Giovlne, Francesco S.; Newman, Michael G.; Pirk, Frederick W.; Wilson, Thomas G.; Higginbottom, Frank L.; Duff, Gordon W. (1997). "The interleukin-1 genotype as a severity factor in adult periodontal disease". Journal of Clinical Periodontology. 24 (1): 72–77. doi:10.1111/j.1600-051X.1997.tb01187.x. PMID 9049801.
