= Thomas Duncan (painter) =

Scottish painter

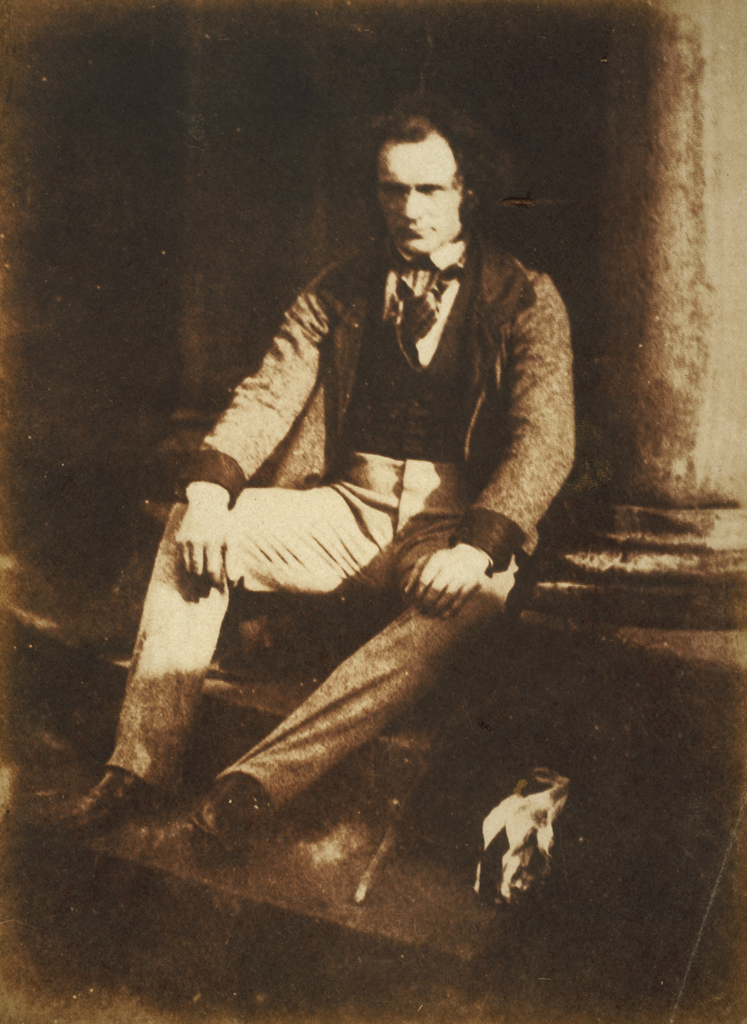
- Duncan in 1844, by Hill & Adamson
- Born: 4 May 1807; Kinclaven
- Died: 25 April 1845 (aged 37); Edinburgh
- Resting place: Warriston Cemetery

Thomas Duncan ARA RSA (4 May 1807 – 25 April 1845) was a Scottish portrait and historical painter.

== Life ==
Duncan was born in Kinclaven, Perthshire on 4 May 1807.

Educated at the Perth Academy, he began studying law, but abandoned it for art. Beginning under the instruction of Sir William Allan, he attained early distinction as a delineator of the human figure; and his first pictures established his fame so completely, that at a very early age he was appointed professor of coloring and afterwards of drawing, in the Trustees' Academy of Edinburgh.

In the 1830s, his address is given as 1 Darnaway Street, a large Georgian flat on the edge of the Moray Estate in the west end of Edinburgh's New Town.

He died of a brain tumour in Edinburgh on 25 April 1845.

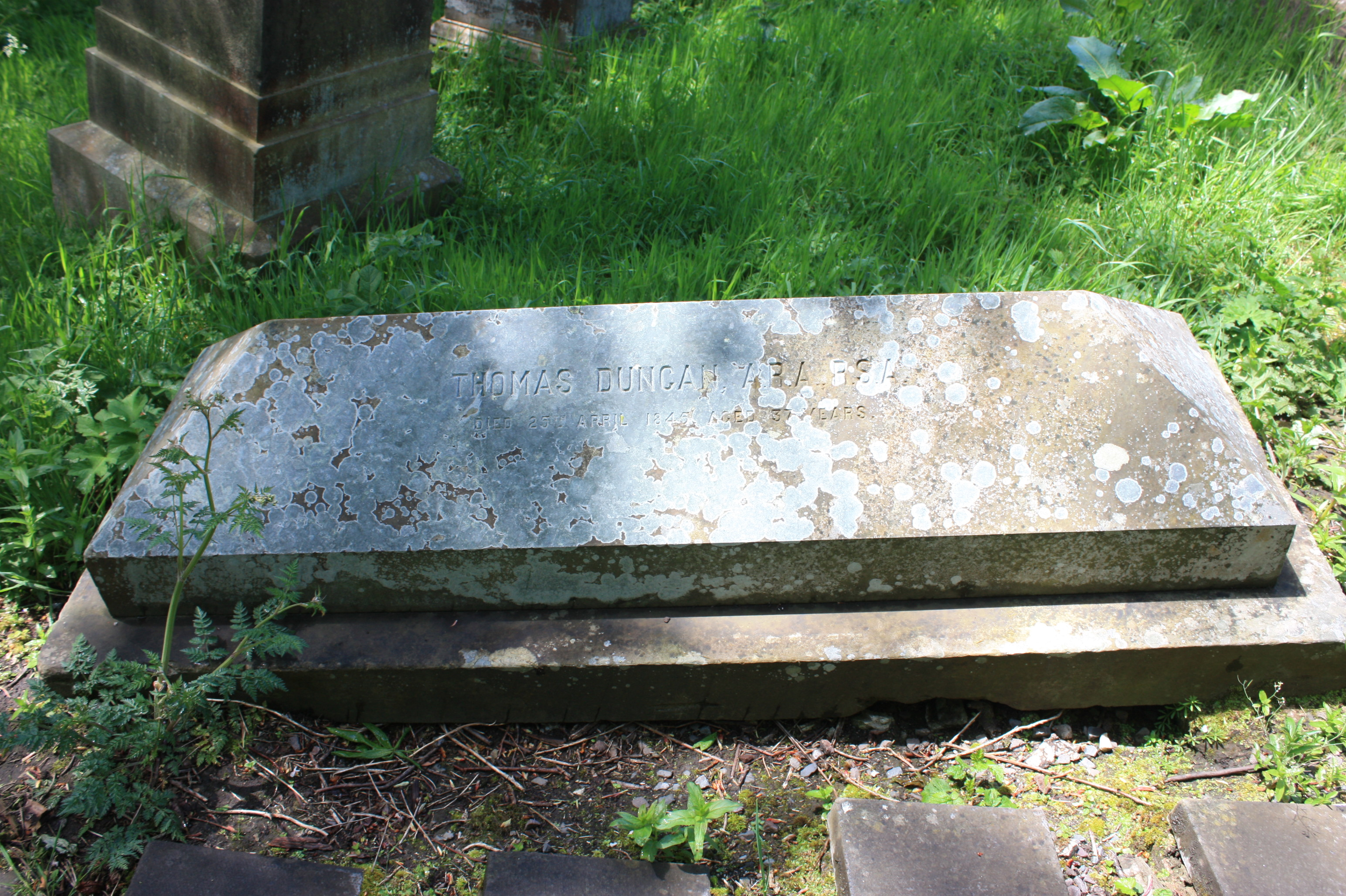
The grave of Thomas Duncan, Warriston Cemetery

He is buried in Warriston Cemetery in north Edinburgh. The grave lies on a slope next to the steps at the east end of the vaults next to the grave of James Young Simpson.

== Works ==
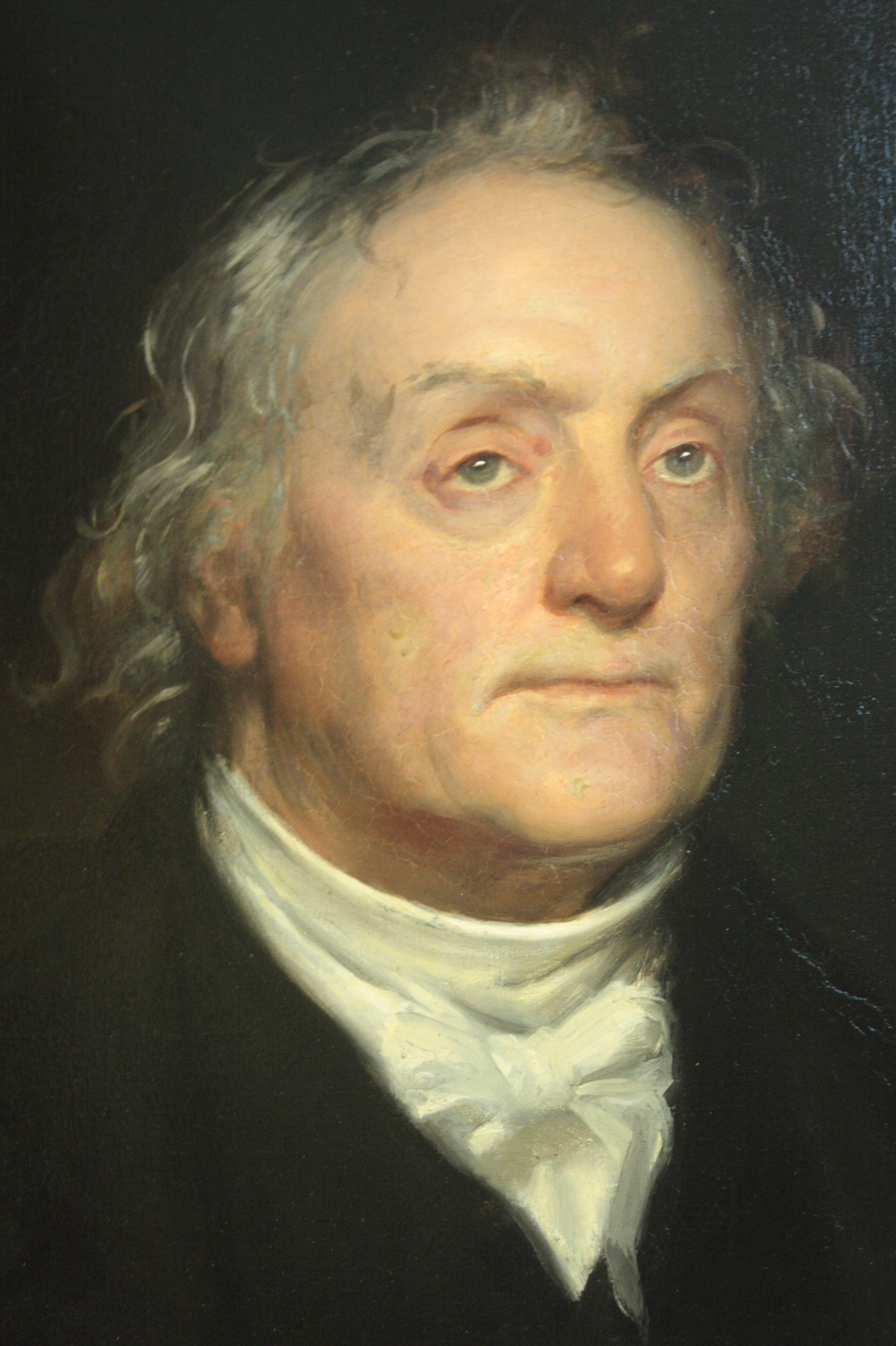
Rev Thomas Chalmers by Thomas Duncan 1840

In 1840, Duncan painted one of his finest pictures, Charles Edward Stuart and the Highlanders entering Edinburgh after the Battle of Prestonpans, which secured his election as an associate of the Royal Academy in 1843. In the same year, he produced his picture of Charles Edward asleep after Culloden, protected by Flora MacDonald, which, like many other of his works, has been often engraved. In 1844, appeared his Cupid, and his Martyrdom of John Brown of Priesthill.

His last known work (late 1844) was a self-portrait, now in the National Gallery in Edinburgh. He particularly excelled in his portraits of ladies and children, yet his own portrait was painted by Robert Scott Lauder.
