= Atholl Henderson =

Scottish professional football player

Personal information
- Date of birth: 7 October 1957 (age 69)
- Place of birth: Perth, Scotland
- Position: Forward

Senior career*
Years	Team	Apps	(Gls)
1974–1976	St. Johnstone	8	(0)
1976–1977	Celtic	0	(0)
1977	Dunfermline		
1977–1980	Forfar Athletic	37	(9)
1979–1983	Brechin City	83	(14)
- * Club domestic league appearances and goals

Atholl Henderson (born 7 October 1957) is a Scottish former professional football player and coach. After retiring from the playing side, he became a coach who introduced thousands of children to football in various roles.

He played for five clubs in a nine-year career: St Johnstone, Celtic, Dunfermline Athletic and Brechin City.

== Playing career ==
=== St Johnstone ===
While studying at Perth Academy, in his home city, Henderson signed for St Johnstone, who were then based at Muirton Park and managed by Willie Ormond, on a schoolboy form on 28 December 1971. He left school in 1974 and went full-time with Saints for two seasons. The club went part-time at the end of his second season, at which point he was released.

=== Celtic ===
Henderson was training with Rangers in 1976 when he was approached by their Old Firm rivals Celtic, after John Clark put the wheels in motion. He played "a few games" for them, but suffered an injury in April that kept him out for about eighteen months.

=== Forfar Athletic ===
After a brief, uneventful stint with Dunfermline Athletic, Henderson signed for Forfar Athletic in 1977. He made 37 league appearances and scored nine goals in three years.

=== Brechin City ===
He joined Brechin City in 1979, and in four years he made 83 league appearances and found the net fourteen times. He retired from playing at the end of his contract in 1983.

== Coaching career ==
Henderson's first official community post occurred in 1992, but he had already been coaching under St Johnstone manager Alex Rennie around 1984, holding popular Saturday-morning coaching sessions on the all-weather pitches at McDiarmid Park. He later began Soccer Sevens games on Perth's North Inch on Sunday mornings. In 1992, he applied to become a coach at several clubs, including St Johnstone, but he had success with their Tayside rivals Dundee United. He remained at Tannadice for two-and-a-half years.

The opportunity to return to Perth came in 1994, and he joined Paul Sturrock's backroom staff as both a coach and a community officer. In 2016, former Northern Ireland international Danny Griffin, who Henderson brought through the youth ranks at St Johnstone, was appointed to the board of the community trust.

In December 2021, Henderson retired, after exactly fifty years in the game, with his final role being chief executive of St Johnstone's Community Trust, which became a registered charity in 2016. In 2020, the club won the Scottish Football Association's "Best Professional Club in the Community" award.
