= Robert MacDonald (minister) =

Scottish minister (1813–1893)

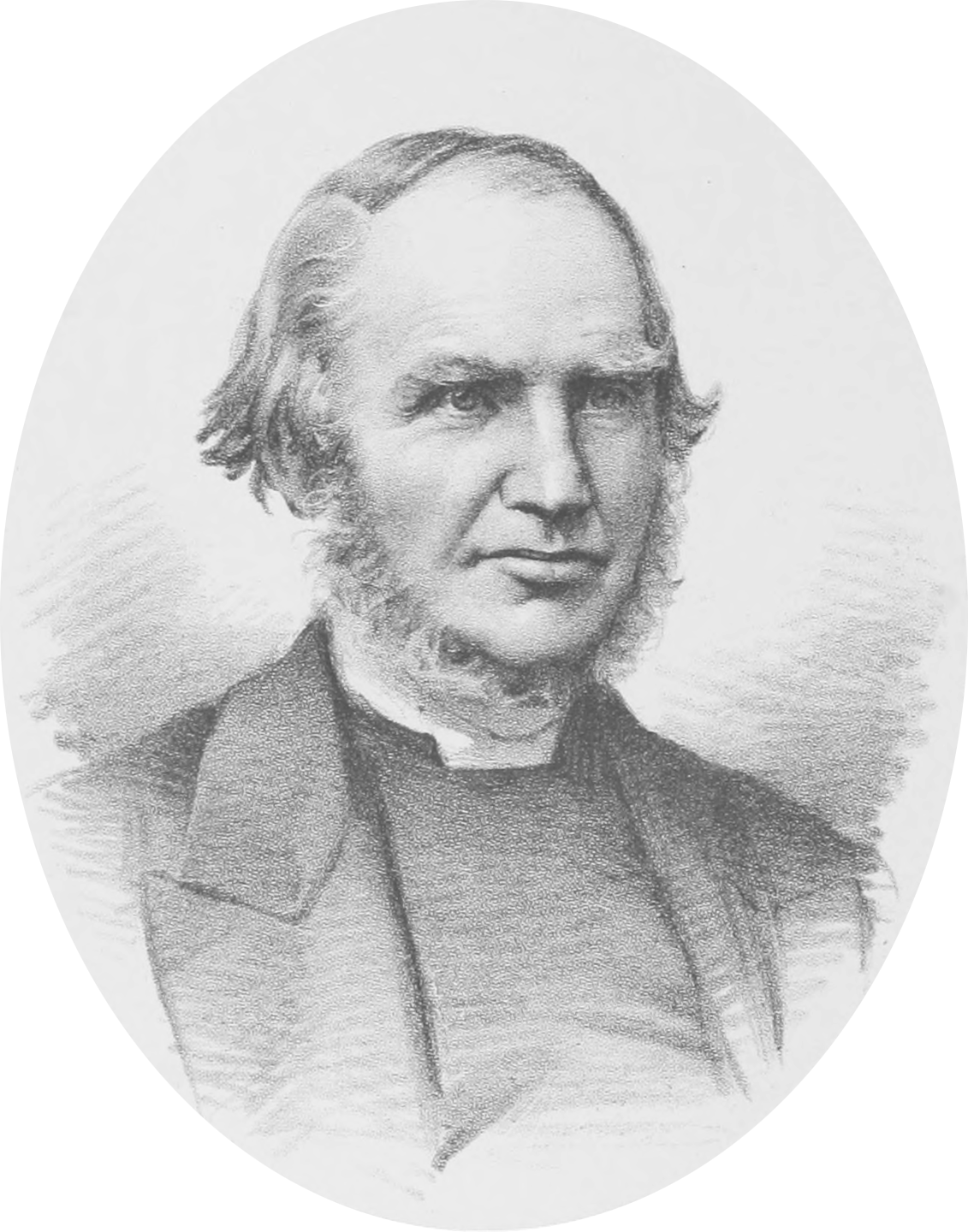
- Robert Macdonald from Disruption Worthies
- Church: Church of Scotland; Free Church of Scotland

Personal details
- Born: 18 May 1813
- Died: 21 August 1893 (aged 80)

minister of Blair Gowrie
- In office 15 June 1837 – 1843

minister Free Church Blair Gowrie
- In office 1843 – 12 March 1857

minister of North Leith Free Church
- In office 12 March 1857 – 1881

Moderator of the General Assembly of the Free Church of Scotland
- In office 1882–1885

Robert MacDonald (1813–1893) was a Scottish minister of the Free Church of Scotland who served as Moderator of the General Assembly in 1882/83.

== Life ==
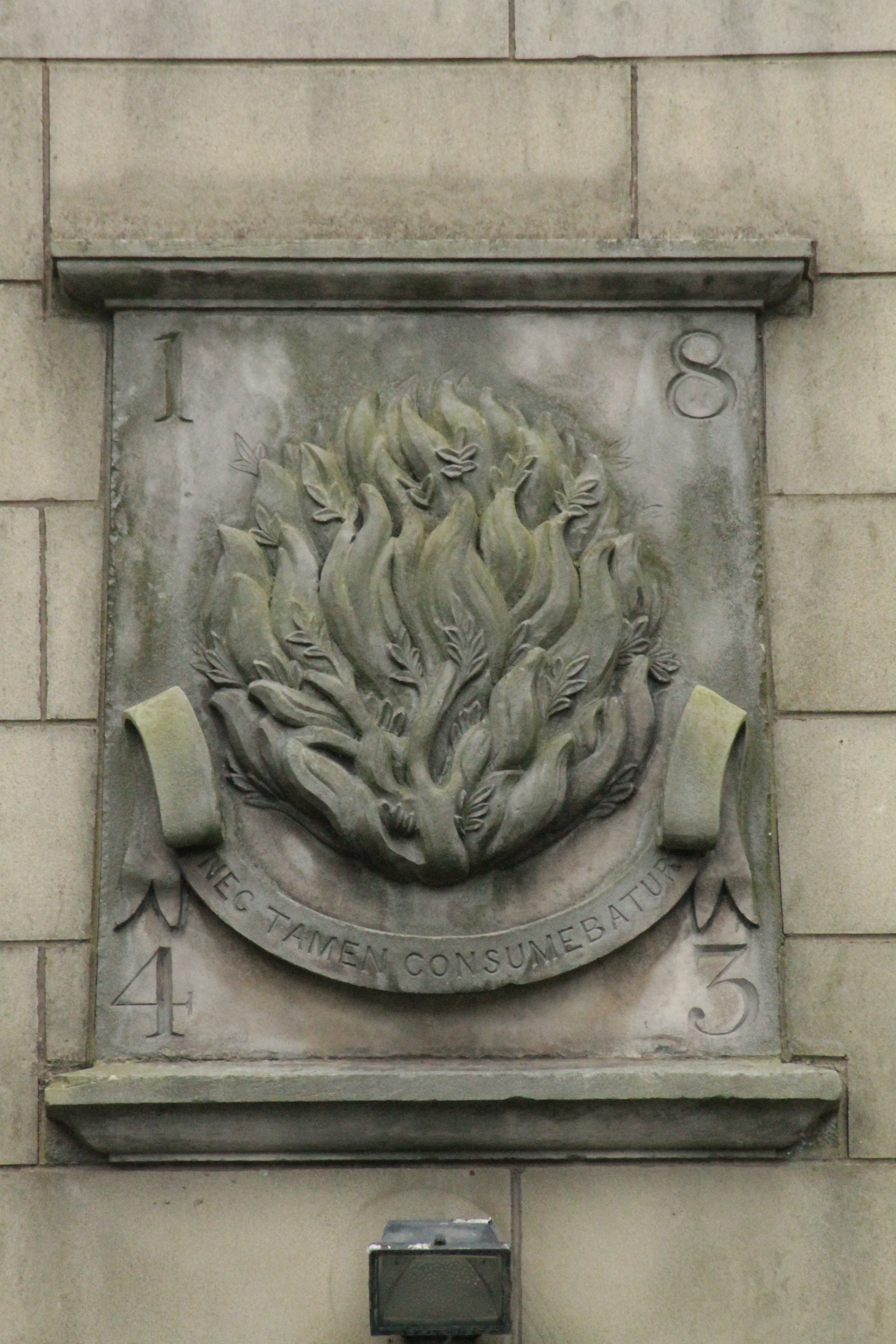
The Free Church's burning bush tablet in North Leith

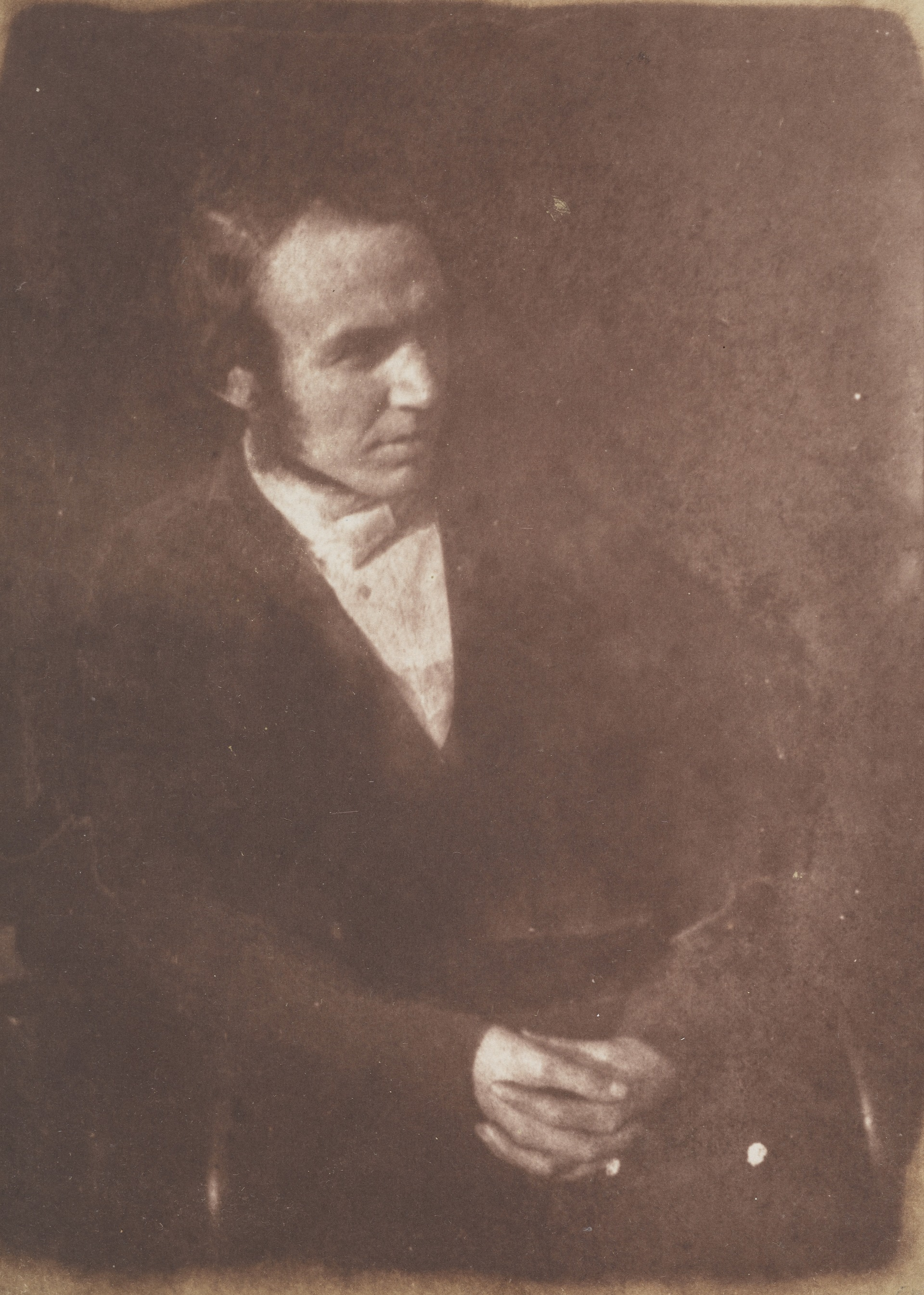
Robert MacDonald by Hill & Adamson. Glasgow University have other photographs by Hill & Adamson.

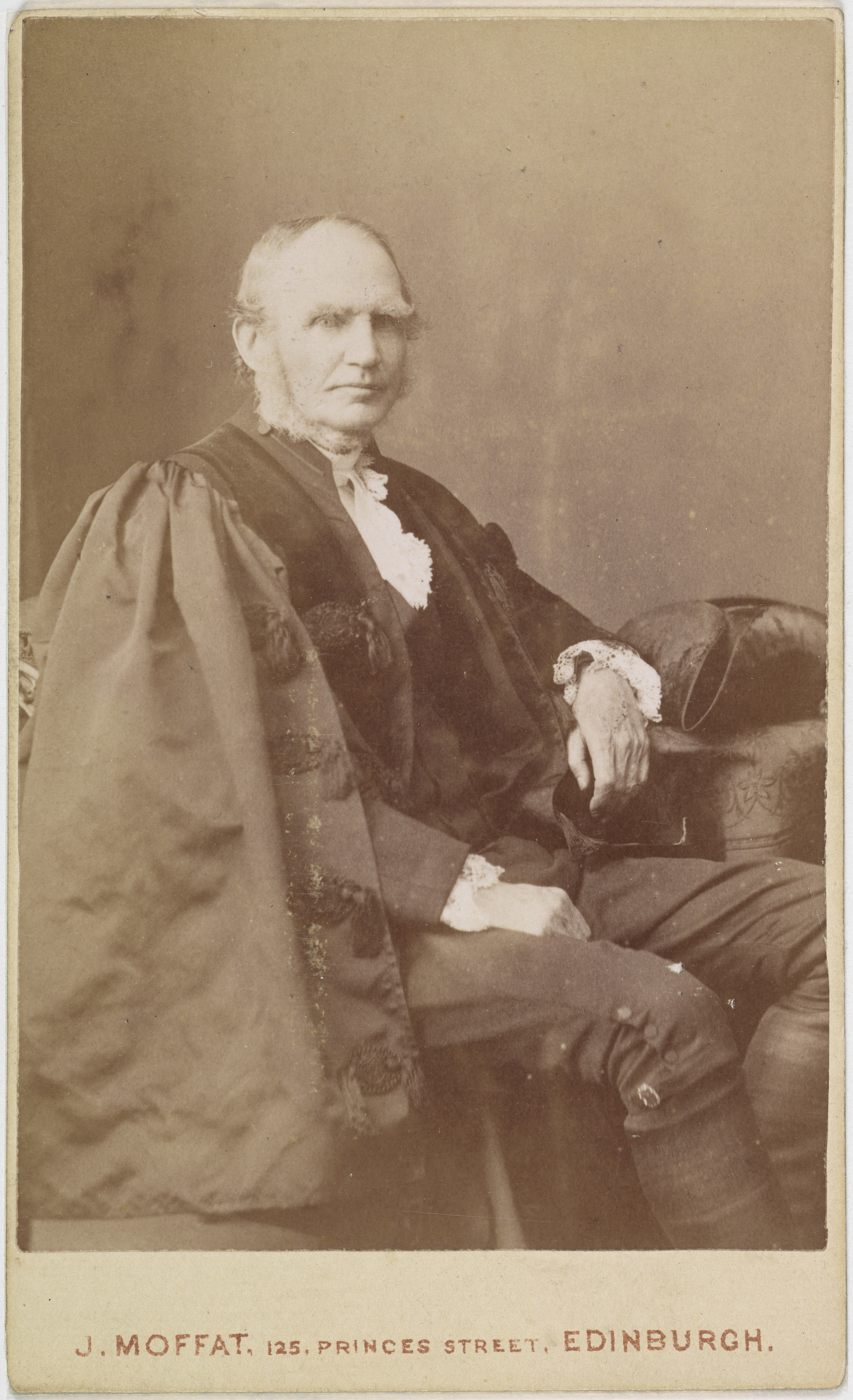
Robert MacDonald by John Moffat

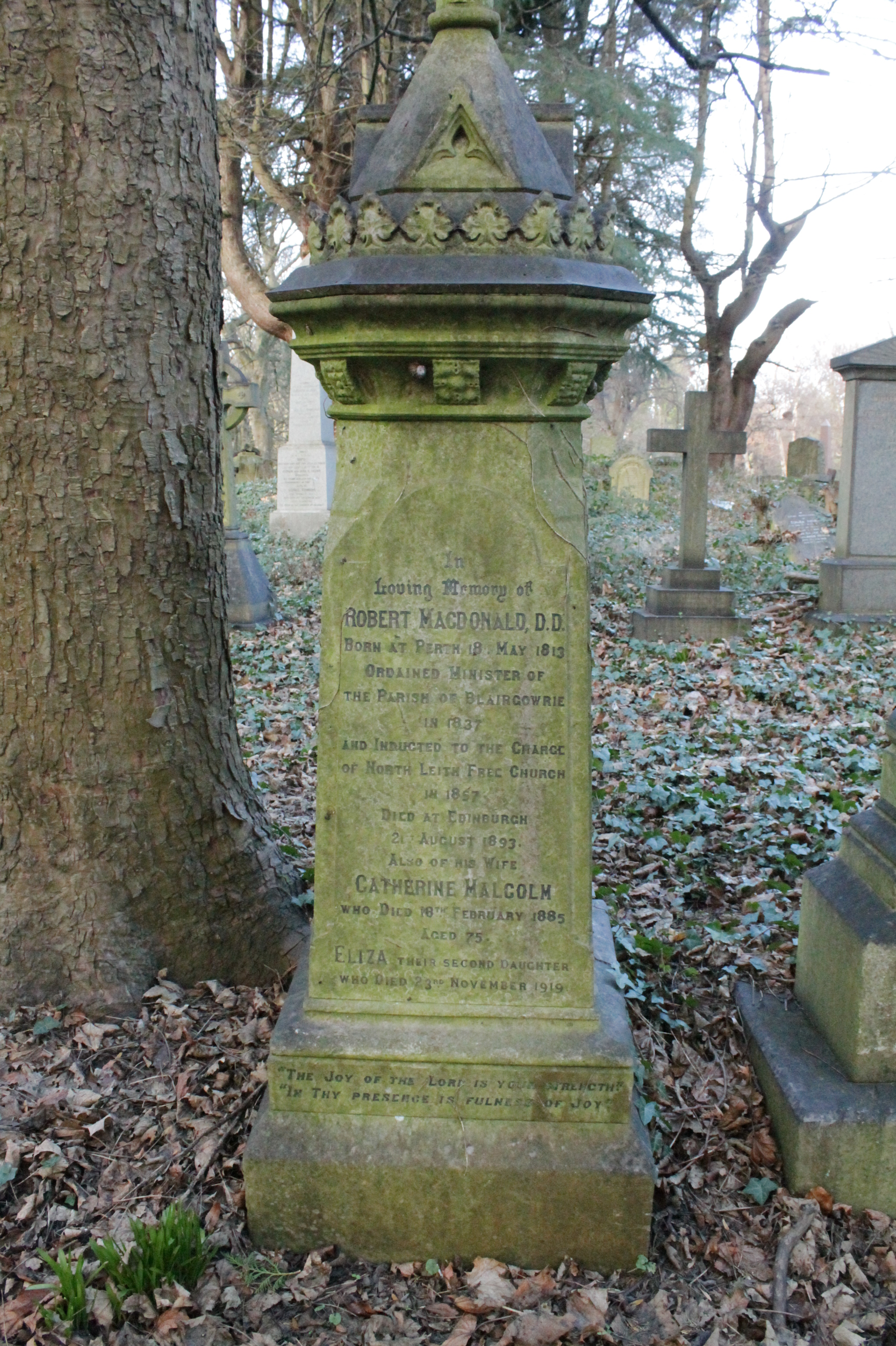
The grave of Very Rev Robert MacDonald, Warriston Cemetery

He was born in Perth on 18 May 1813, the son of Alexander MacDonald, wine merchant, and Charlotte Macfarlane. and educated at Perth Academy. He studied divinity at St Andrews University and Divinity Hall in Edinburgh studying under David Welsh and Thomas Chalmers.

He filled a vacant post at Logiealmond in 1836 but without ordination. He was ordained by the Church of Scotland at Blairgowrie on 15 June 1837. His patron was Mr Oliphant of Gask (Scott has "Mrs Oliphant of Gask and Ardblair in February"). He left the established church in the Disruption of 1843. Together with a group of other ministers from Central Scotland including Robert McCheyne and Andrew Bonar, they conceived the idea of the Free Church "like a torch of fire in a sheaf". This symbol was widely adopted by the Free Church. It is often mistaken for a burning bush as described in the Bible story in Exodus.

Along with Rev Thomas Chalmers he was one of the main figures in organising the building of New College on the Mound in Edinburgh. His other main work for the Free Church was the establishment of the Non-Conformist School System across all Scotland, which in turn paved the way for the Education (Scotland) Act 1872. From 1843 he organised the 300 parish teachers, formerly paid by the Church of Scotland, who had left to join the Free Church. The first year was financially very difficult. MacDonald set to raise £50,000 to cover the needed costs. In the assembly of 1844 he announced that he had secured subscriptions of £52,000 therefore fully meeting his objectives.

He was translated to North Leith Free Church on Ferry Road in Edinburgh in 1857. He lived nearby at 2 Jamaica Street now called Summerside Place. The congregation increased from 450 to 1100 under his ministry. St Andrews University awarded him an honorary doctorate (DD) in 1870.

He retired in 1879 and went to lived at 11 Gloucester Place in Stockbridge, Edinburgh. His ministry at North Leith was taken over by the Rev Thomas Crerar.

In 1882 he succeeded Rev William Laughton as Moderator of the General Assembly, the highest position in the Free Church of Scotland. He was succeeded in turn in 1885 by Rev Horatius Bonar.

He died in Edinburgh on 21 August 1893. He is buried in Warriston Cemetery in north Edinburgh. The grave lies on the south side of the central roundel.

MacDonald's North Leith Free Church at 74 Ferry Road closed to worship in 1981 and was demolished in 1983 to make way for a care home. However, the "Burning Sheaf" stone, bearing the date 1843, was salvaged and now stands in the church hall of North Leith Church (Church of Scotland) nearby on Madeira Street.

== Family ==
He was married to Catherine Malcolm (1810–1885). Robert McCheyne, is noted as his "groomsman", what is now called best man at their wedding. They had at least two daughters.

He married 4 June 1840, Catherine Malcolm, who died 18 February 1880, aged 75, and had issue —

- Jessy Dingwall Fordyce (married 1866, Sir Thomas Grainger Stewart, M.D., LL.D., Edinburgh), died 10 June 1921
- Charlotte Jane (married Robert Macdonald, S.S.C., Edinburgh)
- and others.

== Publications ==
- A Word to Everyone : being the Message-bearer; A Dark Night at Hand (Dundee, 1843)
- Tests for the Times (Dundee, 1845)
- Lessons for the Present from the Records of the Past (Edinburgh, 1848)
- Preface to M'Cheyne's "Expositions of the Epistles to the Seven Churches of Asia"
- From Day to Day, a volume of Daily Readings; Antiquity and Perpetuity of the Sabbath (Stirling, 1856)
- Anniversary Sermon (Glasgow, 1865).
