= Alastair Cram =

Scottish lawyer and British army officer

Alistair Cram MC
- Born: Alastair Lorimer Cram; 25 August 1909; Perth, Scotland
- Died: 17 March 1994 (aged 84) Edinburgh, Scotland
- Allegiance: United Kingdom
- Branch: British Army

Major Alastair Lorimer Cram MC (25 August 1909 – 17 March 1994) was a Scottish mountaineer, lawyer and British Army officer during the Second World War.

Cram was born in Perth, the son of solicitor Duncan Cram. He was an outstanding athlete, founding the Perth chapter of the Junior Mountaineering Club in 1930 and winning the Scottish A.A.A. half-mile championship in 1933. He was educated at Perth Academy and the University of Edinburgh, earning his LLB in 1934. After an apprenticeship with Balfour and Manson in Edinburgh, he joined his father's firm, Mitchell & Cram, in Perth.

Cram joined the Royal Artillery in 1939. He was taken prisoner in 1941 during the Battle of Sidi Rezegh in North Africa. He subsequently made 21 escape attempts, finally succeeding in April 1945, just one month before the end of the war in Europe. He was awarded the Military Cross for his escape efforts.

After the war, he served with the SAS and the Intelligence Corps. An excellent linguist, Cram spoke French, German, Italian, and Czech. He was stationed in Germany on intelligence duties in November 1946, serving with the War Crimes Commission.

Following the war, he was admitted to the Faculty of Advocates in Edinburgh. In 1948, he was appointed a resident magistrate in Kenya, a senior resident magistrate in 1957 and a puisne judge in 1960. In Kenya, he played a role in questioning the treatment of detained Mau Mau rebels.
