= Perth Academy =

High school in Perth, Scotland

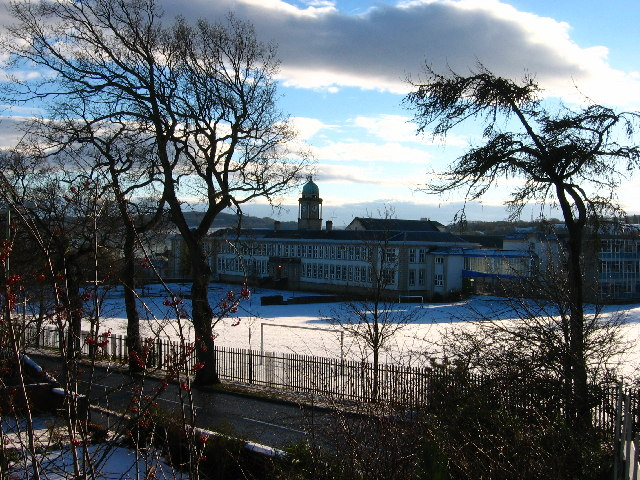
- Perth Academy in 2006

Location
- Murray Place; Perth, Perth and Kinross, PH1 1NJ; Scotland

Information
- School type: State school, High School
- Motto: Pro Rege Lege et Grege
- Founded: 1696 (330 years ago)
- Status: Active
- Local authority: Perth and Kinross Council
- Rector: Eleanor Paul
- Enrollment: 1016
- Education system: Secondary education
- Language: English
- Hours in school day: 6.5 (not including after-school activities)
- Colours: Navy blue and white
- Sports: football, curling, hockey, trampoling, rugby and gymnastics
- Feeder schools: Balbeggie Primary, Collace Primary, Goodlyburn Primary, Guildtown Primary, Letham Primary, Robert Douglas Memorial School, Viewlands Primary
- Website: https://www.perthacademy.org.uk/

Perth Academy is a state comprehensive secondary school in Perth, Scotland. It was founded in 1696. The institution is a non-denominational one. The school occupies ground on the side of a hill in the Viewlands area of Perth, and is within the Perth and Kinross Council area.

== History ==
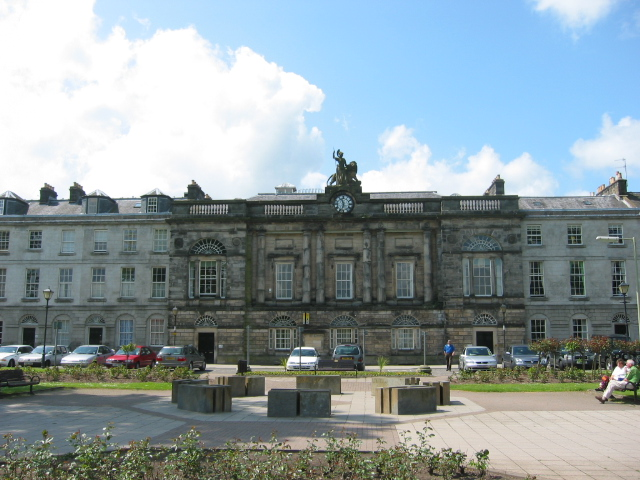
The Old Academy building, situated just over two miles to the northeast of today's structure

While able to claim a strong connection to the Perth Grammar School, founded in the 12th century, the name Perth Academy first appears in 1542 when it was founded by the town council, making Perth Academy one of the oldest schools in Scotland. The first rector of the school was the Honourable John Murray (later Duke of Atholl); at this time it was considered a purely honorary title, before later being given to the headmaster of the school. By April 1762, accommodation was first provided for the school, in the form of a two-storey building which occupied the site of the current Perth City Hall.

At this time, education in Perth was provided by a variety of smaller institutions, each specialising in a particular field. By the beginning of the 19th century, it was felt that the disparate nature of these, often cramped, buildings was detrimental to the efficiency and success of the schools. This, combined with a new appreciation of the value of education, led to a new building being built to house the different schools. Designed by Robert Reid, later the King's architect, work on this building was started in October 1803, and finished for the start of the teaching year in 1807. The building housed the academy (at the time specialising mostly in Maths and the sciences), the grammar school (specialising mostly in Classics, History, and Philosophy), the English school, the French school, the Drawing and Painting school, and the Writing school. Together, they were known as the public Seminaries, and were housed in what is now known as the Old Academy, on Rose Terrace, near the North Inch of Perth.

This arrangement was continued until 1892, when, under the terms of the Elementary Education Act 1870, control of the schools was transferred from the council to the newly created school board. At this point, the term Seminaries was no longer used and the institution began to be officially termed Perth Academy, with the other schools being termed as departments within the school in the 1873 prospectus. Teachers were still paid separately and collected their share of the tuition fees directly from the students in their classes. In 1881, this was changed, with the fees going into a central treasury before being redistributed.

In 1915, the academy was amalgamated with the rival Sharp's institution, also located in Perth, leading to a decrease in the fees paid by students.

The school moved to its present site at Viewlands on 1 September 1932, construction on the building having begun two years earlier. The buildings were designed by the Edinburgh architects and school specialists Reid & Forbes, one of their late classical works.

Up to 1968, the school was a selective senior secondary school with entrants being required to sit an entrance exam. At this time, the schools had a large catchment area of over 642 square miles, including Dunkeld, Kinross, Errol and Methven. In 1971, the school become a comprehensive school serving all pupils within a smaller catchment area.

Large extensions were added to the school in 1990, including a separate building for a gymnasium and games hall, as well as workshops and an art studio. The science laboratories were also renovated at this time, with computer rooms being added and suites created for the music and business departments.

== Grounds and facilities ==
Perth Academy is situated in the middle of extensive grounds, stretching to some 11.93 ha, a large part of which comprises sports pitches. The campus is shared with Viewlands Primary School, with many students attending both during their education, and Fairview School, an additional support needs school. The main building for Perth Academy holds all the school's classrooms across two floors, including several science labs, computer rooms, carpentry and metal working rooms, and kitchens for the teaching of cookery. The school canteen is in a separate, smaller building which outside lunch times also serves as a gym room and holds a suite of exercise equipment, such as treadmills. There is also a separate block housing the physical education department which includes two indoor areas for gym and sports activities. A map of the world has also been painted on the playground as a part of the World at Your Feet project run by the Royal Scottish Geographical Society aimed at encouraging the education of school children in geography. In 2014, construction started on a new all-weather pitch, despite resistance from many of the pupils, as the construction meant the removal and destruction of a Scots pine, a tree older than the school itself. The pitch was finished in time for the start of the 2014–15 summer term.

== Curriculum ==
The school follows the national curriculum for Scotland, including the teaching of cooking and technical subjects. In line with Scottish Parliament education policy, the school moved to the Curriculum for Excellence.

As well as the subjects taught within the school, Perth Academy has established links with other education establishments in Perth, including Perth High School and Perth College. These links allow the school to indirectly offer courses outwith its usual capacity to teach.

== Extracurricular activities ==
The school provides a wide range of activities for students and was praised by Her Majesty's Inspectorate of Education for the development of young people through these activities.

The school regularly fields teams for, and hosts, events including hockey and rugby, as well as competing in athletics at county sport level. The school also tries to help develop skills in the pupils as team leaders through activities such as a Sports Leader course and by giving pupils the chance to help lead sports sessions at the neighbouring Viewlands Primary and Fairview schools. There is also netball, table tennis, basketball, badminton, gymnastics, a cheerleading squad and dancing. The school also runs an award-winning "school of rugby" programme for S1 and S2 pupils. This initiative is jointly funded by the school, Perthshire RFC and Scottish Rugby Union, utilising the "cash back for communities fund".

== Awards and recognition ==
Perth Academy was awarded the silver award in January 2006 for its participation in activities relating to Eco-Schools Scotland. The silver flag award is the middle award between bronze and green. In order to obtain the silver flag award, Perth Academy had to use their initiative to involve some students in activities relating to the following categories: litter, energy, health and well-being, transport, waste minimisation, biodiversity, school grounds, water, sustaining our world and food and the environment.

The school was inspected in 2010 and was rated as "satisfactory" or "good" in every category.

== Catchment area ==
The school serves a large, mostly rural, catchment area, split into three distinct areas:

- The west of Perth, served by Viewlands, Letham, and Goodlyburn Primary Schools.
- The rural area to the north-east of the city, served by Robert Douglas Memorial School, Scone, and Balbeggie, Burrelton, Collace, and Guildtown Primary Schools.
- A further rural area served by Arngask Primary school in Glenfarg.

== Notable former pupils ==
=== 17th and 18th century ===
- James Bisset, artist. manufacturer, writer and collector
- Colin Campbell, 1st Baron Clyde, British army officer and colonial governor.
- Patrick Campbell, Vice-Admiral
- David Low, agriculturist

=== 19th century ===
- James Bannerman, Church of Scotland minister and theologian
- Arthur Kinmond Bell, whisky distiller and philanthropist
- Francis Black, politician
- Arthur Dewar, Lord Dewar, politician and judge
- Thomas Duncan, portrait painter
- John Forbes, mathematician and academic
- Patrick Fraser, Lord Fraser, jurist and judge
- Patrick Geddes, biologist, sociologist, geographer, philanthropist and pioneering town planner
- David Octavius Hill, painter and arts activist
- William Keller, anatomist
- Henry Littlejohn, surgeon, forensic scientist and public health official
- Robert Macdonald, minister of the Free Church of Scotland
- James MacGregor moderator of the General Assembly of the Church of Scotland.
- John Sturgeon Mackay, educated here and also taught maths here from 1863 to 1866
- Thomas McWhannell, member of the Queensland Legislative Assembly
- Patrick Matthew, published early work on natural selection in 1831
- James Miller, architect
- Robert Pullar, Liberal politician
- Condie Sandeman, advocate
- Duncan Sommerville, mathematician and astronomer
- James Stewart, physician and missionary
- William Thomson, mathematician and physicist
- John Wishart, mathematician and agricultural statistician

=== 20th century ===
- Neil Cameron, Baron Cameron of Balhousie, senior officer in Royal Air Force
- Aileen Campbell, Member of the Scottish Parliament for Clydesdale (SNP)
- Iain Donald Campbell, biophysicist and academic
- Stuart Cosgrove, journalist
- Alastair Cram, mountaineer, lawyer and British Army officer
- John Keir Cross, writer
- Arthur Dewar, first-class cricketer
- Sir Gordon Duff, principal of St Hilda's College, Oxford
- Michelle Duncan, actress
- Rt Hon Sir David Edward, former Judge of the Court of Justice of the European Communities
- Robert Fairbairn, chairman of Clydesdale Bank and first-class cricketer
- John Farquhar, first-class cricketer
- Gemma Fay, international footballer
- Stephen Gethins, Member of UK parliament
- Neil A. R. Gow, professor of microbiology and deputy Vice Chancellor at the University of Exeter
- Mary Packer Harris, artist and art teacher
- Atholl Henderson, footballer and coach
- Edward Lindsay Ince, mathematician
- George Mathewson, chairman of Royal Bank of Scotland
- Fred MacAulay, comedian
- James McGhie, Lord McGhie, chairman of the Scottish Land Court and President of the Lands Tribunal for Scotland, and a Senator of the College of Justice
- Robert McLaren, first-class cricketer
- Sir John Chetham McLeod, senior British Army officer
- Ian McPherson, first-class cricketer
- Robert MacGregor Mitchell, Lord MacGregor Mitchell, lawyer and judge
- John Monteath Robertson, chemist and crystallographer
- Ronald Foote Robertson, President of the British Medical Association
- Philip Scott, footballer
- Rhod Sharp, broadcaster
- Jack Shaw, businessman, former chairman of the board of directors and Governor of the Bank of Scotland
- Richard Simpson, Member of the Scottish Parliament
- Brian Souter, businessman
- William Soutar, poet
- David Stewart, first-class cricketer
- David Kinnear Thomson, chairman and president of Peter Thomson (Perth) Limited
- Anthony Toft, President of the Royal College of Physicians of Edinburgh
- Sandy Wylie, Lord Kinclaven, Senator of the College of Justice, a judge of the Supreme Courts of Scotland
- Barbara Young, Baroness Young of Old Scone, member of the House of Lords
- Fergus Purdie, architect
- Mabel Milne, volunteer nurse killed by German bomb in First World War

=== 21st century ===
- Camilla Hattersley, swimmer
- Stephen Milne, swimmer
- Mili Smith, curler
- Luke Graham, professional footballer

== Notable staff ==
- Dr. Adam Anderson, economist and Rector of Perth Academy, 1692–1765
- John Davidson (1857–1909), dramatist and poet, taught at Perth Academy from 1878 to 1881
- Edward Smart FRSE (d. 1939), maths master 1899–1915, rector 1915–1930
- William Wallace, maths master from 1794
