= Rhod Sharp =

Scottish broadcaster (born 1953)

- Born: Rhoderick Sharp; 14 July 1953 (age 72–73); Perth, Scotland
- Education: University of Aberdeen
- Spouse: Vicki Staveacre
- Presenting career
- Country: United Kingdom

Rhoderick Sharp (born 1953 in Perth) is a Scottish broadcaster, best known as a former presenter of Up All Night on BBC Radio 5 Live.

== Early life ==
After being educated at Perth Academy, Sharp took a degree in English at the University of Aberdeen. Graduating with honours in 1975, he was selected as scholar of the St Andrews Society of New York, and then studied for a Masters at Princeton University combining literature, theatre and politics.

== Journalism career ==
Having been offered the opportunity to join the BBC's journalistic training programme in 1975, after completing his one-year MA, Sharp joined the BBC in 1976 as a trainee journalist.

Upon qualification he became a BBC TV news scriptwriter, and then a reporter for IRN/LBC. After helping to start the independent Radio Tay in Dundee, he then freelanced for mostly British news outlets in California for six years until 1987. Joining BBC News, Sharp was the channel's correspondent in California and the Pacific Northwest. In 1987 he moved with his wife to London as a reporter for the BBC World Service, then as duty foreign editor at Channel 4 News.

Returning to BBC News, when the corporation started the news and sport station Radio 5 (now 5 Live) in 1994, Sharp came up with the idea for the programme Up All Night. Since its launch he has been one of the two regular presenters. The Washington Post once described the show as probably the best night-time radio show in the world.

In 2001, Sharp was on the second commercial flight to New York City after 11 September to give in-depth analysis of the aftermath of the terrorist attacks. He also presented 5 Live's programmes on the American presidential and congressional elections. He has become instrumental in giving wider coverage on British radio of sports like baseball and American football, presenting its live broadcasts of the World Series and the Super Bowl.

After reporting on the 11 September attacks, while taking a sabbatical, Sharp and his wife fell in love with the fishing town of Marblehead, Massachusetts, USA. From 2004 he presented his editions of the show (Monday to Wednesday) from the town. Initially using the studios and ISDN line of local radio station WESX to connect him to Broadcasting House, London, from 2007 he presented the show from a home studio within the couple's 18th-century property. Broadcasting from the United States made Sharp "pretty unique" among BBC radio hosts, according to the then BBC deputy news director Stephen Mitchell.

In March 2020, after having presented Up All Night for 26 years, Sharp stood down.

== Personal life ==
Whilst broadcasting from San Francisco in the early 1980s, Sharp met his future wife Vicki Staveacre. The couple moved to London in the 1980s, where Sharp later created Up All Night. Following 9/11, the couple took a two-month sabbatical in Harvard, Massachusetts. On forays to North Shore, they became enamoured with Marblehead. In 2004, they bought a small apartment in the seaside town, and in 2007 moved to their present home, an 18th-century house in Marblehead's Old Town section.

Sharp is the President of the University of Aberdeen USA Trust, and as of 2012 was intending to apply for US citizenship.
