= Ian McPherson (cricketer) =

Scottish cricketer

Personal information
- Full name: Thomas Ian McPherson
- Born: 14 October 1942 (age 84); Scone, Perthshire, Scotland
- Batting: Right-handed
- Bowling: Slow left-arm orthodox

Domestic team information
- Years: Team
- 1977–1979: Scotland

Career statistics
Competition	First-class
Matches	5
Runs scored	83
Batting average	20.75
100s/50s	–/–
Top score	28
Balls bowled	512
Wickets	10
Bowling average	23.00
5 wickets in innings	–
10 wickets in match	–
Best bowling	4/74
Catches/stumpings	–/–
- Source: Cricinfo, 13 July 2022

Thomas Ian McPherson (born 14 October 1942) is a Scottish former first-class cricketer.

McPherson was born in October 1942 at Scone, Perthshire. He was educated at Perth Academy. A club cricketer for Perthshire Cricket Club, he made his debut Scotland in first-class cricket against Ireland at Dublin in 1977. He made four further first-class appearances for Scotland to 1979, which included matches against the touring New Zealanders in 1978 and Sri Lankans in 1979. Playing in the Scottish side as a slow left-arm orthodox bowler, he took 10 wickets in his five matches at an average of exactly 23, with best figures of 4 for 74. As a tailend batsman, he scored 83 runs at a batting average of 20.75, with a highest score of 28. Outside of cricket, McPherson was by profession a computer analyst.
