= Robert Fairbairn =

Scottish banker and sportsman

Personal information
- Full name: Robert Duncan Fairbairn
- Born: 25 September 1910; Longhirst, Northumberland, England
- Died: 26 March 1988 (aged 77); Guildford, Surrey, England
- Batting: Right-handed

Domestic team information
- Years: Team
- 1938–39: Cheshire
- 1938: Scotland
- 1944–45: Europeans

Career statistics
Competition	First-class
Matches	2
Runs scored	19
Batting average	4.75
100s/50s	–/–
Top score	13
Catches/stumpings	1/–
- Source: Cricinfo, 28 February 2019

Sir Robert Duncan Fairbairn (25 September 1910 – 26 March 1988) was a Scottish banker and amateur sportsman, who was the chairman of Clydesdale Bank from 1975 to 1985. In sport, he played two first-class cricket matches (one of which was for Scotland) and played for St Johnstone in the Scottish Football League.

== Early life and career ==
Fairbairn was born at Longhirst in Northumberland, the fourth of five children of Robert Fairbairn and his wife, Christina Robertson. His family moved to Perth in Scotland, where he attended the Perth Academy. His father was employed as head gamekeeper to Lord Forteviot at Dupplin Castle in Perthshire. After leaving school, he joined the Clydesdale Bank in Perth at 17.

In his youth, Fairbairn was active as a sportsman in the Perth area. He played cricket for the Dupplin and Perthshire clubs, and came to prominence in junior football as an inside-forward for St Johnstone YMCA. In June 1930, he signed for Scottish Football League club St Johnstone as an amateur. He made his senior debut in a 1–1 home draw against King's Park on 23 August 1930, but was "severely barracked" by a Muirton Park crowd disappointed by both his and the team's performance.

After the Clydesdale Bank transferred Fairbairn to their head office in Glasgow, he continued his cricket career as an opening batsman for West of Scotland, and also played football for "one of the Queen's Park elevens".

He was a recipient of the Beckett & Whitehead Prizeman from the Institute of Bankers in 1934, the same year in which he joined the Midland Bank. While still employed by the Midland Bank at Bolton, he played minor counties cricket in England for Cheshire in 1938 and 1939, making seven appearances in the Minor Counties Championship. His debut in first-class cricket came for Scotland against Yorkshire at Harrogate.

== WWII and later career with Clydesdale Bank ==
Fairbairn joined the Royal Naval Volunteer Reserve (RNVR) in 1939, He was a sub lieutenant until September 1940, when he was promoted to the temporary rank of lieutenant. He served in the RNVR until 1946, leaving the reserve with the rank of Lieutenant commander. While serving in the reserve, Fairbairn played one first-class cricket match in British India for the Europeans against the Parsees in the 1944/45 Bombay Pentangular at Bombay. After leaving the reserve, he returned to his profession in banking. He was an assistant general manager for Clydesdale Bank in 1951.

Fairbairn was knighted for services to development in Scotland in the 1975 Birthday Honours. He was chairman of Clydesdale Bank from 1975 to 1985. He died at Guildford in March 1988.
