= John Sturgeon Mackay =

Scottish mathematician (1843–1914)

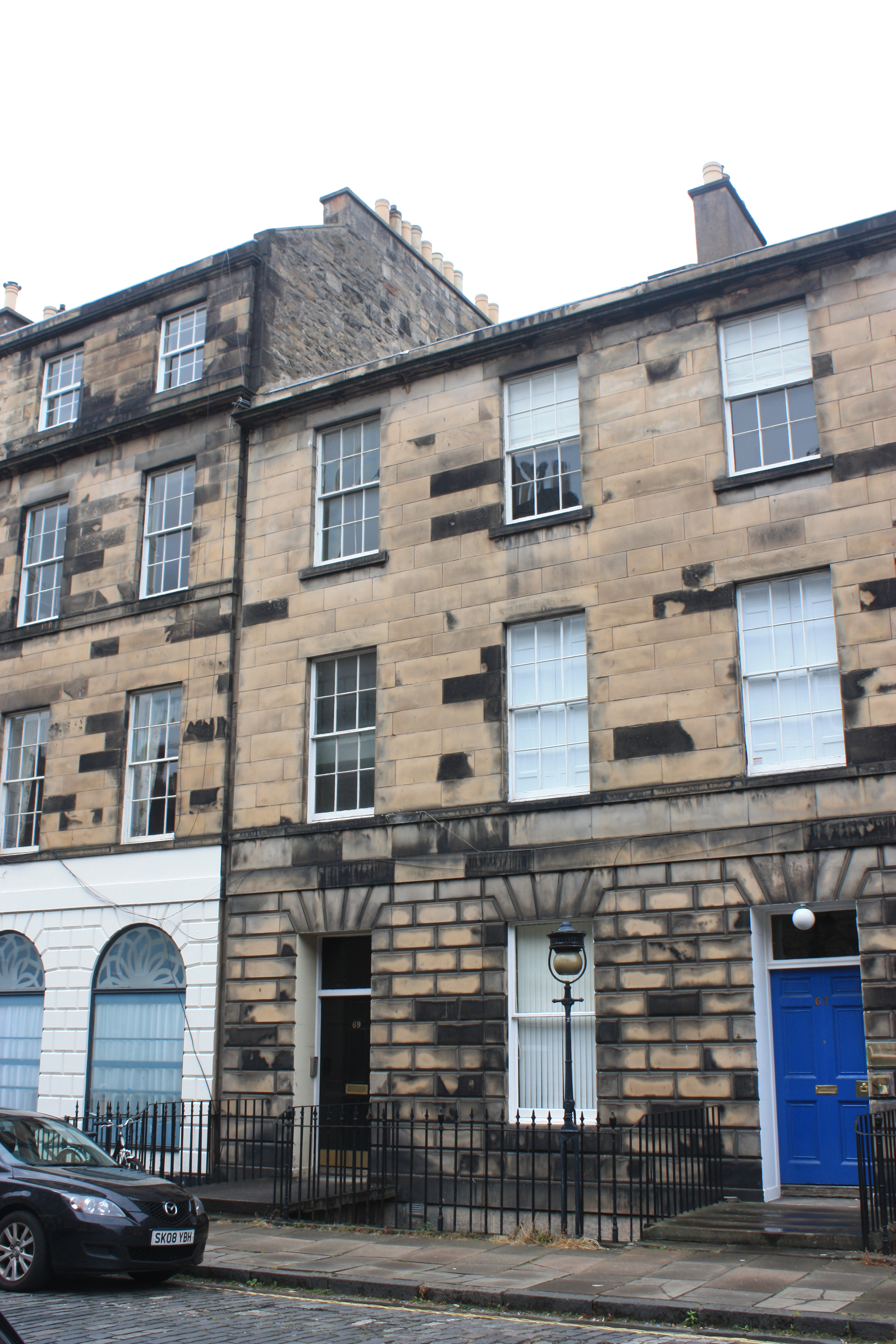
69 Northumberland Street, Edinburgh (black door)

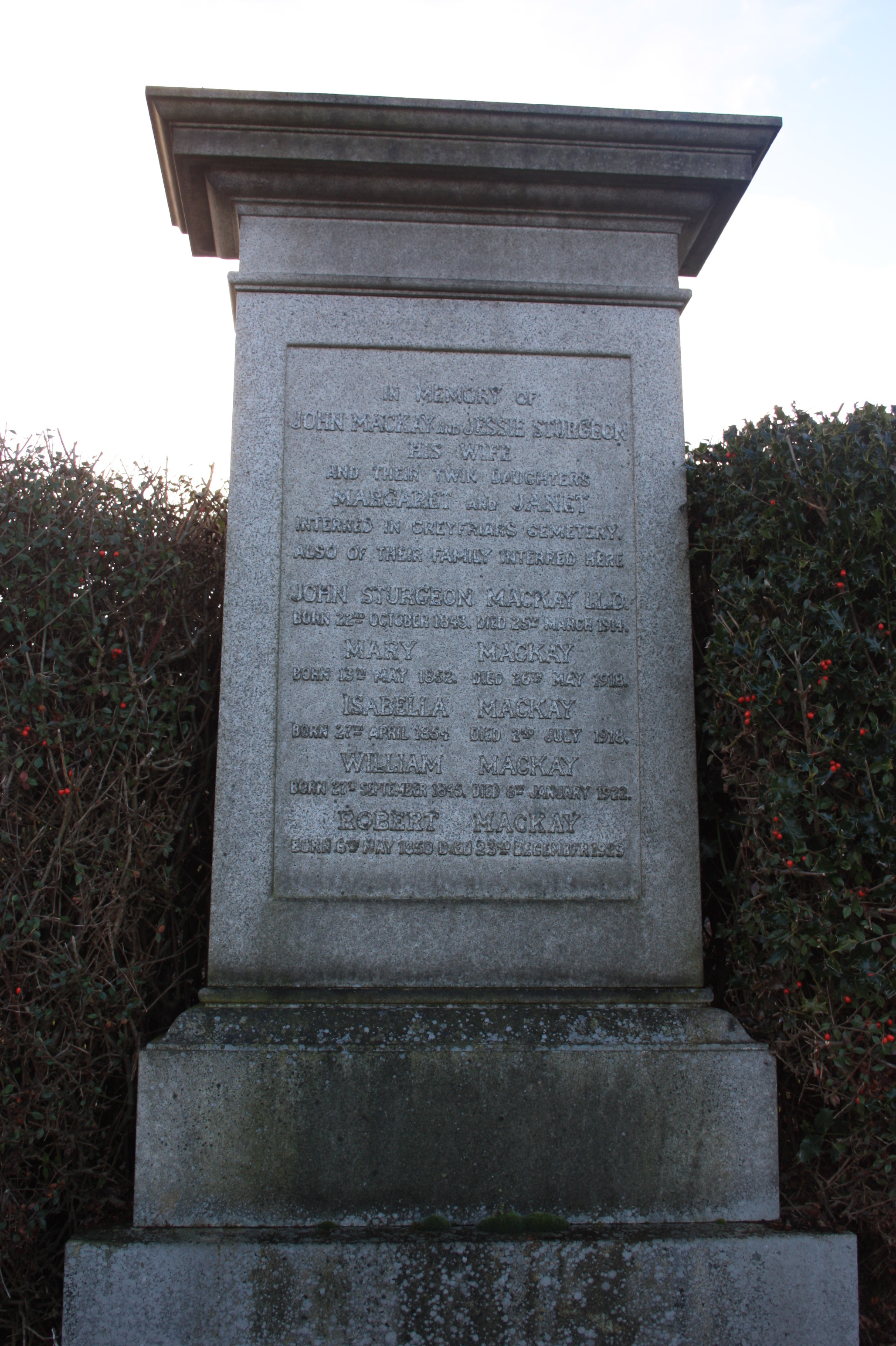
The grave of John Sturgeon Mackay, Wellshill Cemetery, Perth

John Sturgeon Mackay FRSE (1843–1914) was a Scottish mathematician and academic author.

== Life ==
He was born on 22 October 1843 at Auchencairn near Kirkcudbright the son of John Mackay and his wife Jessie Sturgeon. The family moved to Perth early in his life and he was educated at Perth Academy. He entered St Andrews University in 1859 and graduated MA in 1863.

In 1863 he began teaching mathematics at Perth Academy. Although dallying with the idea of training as a minister he instead continued in mathematics, moving as a teacher to Edinburgh Academy in 1866. He initially rented rooms but by 1880 he was living at 85 Great King Street, a grand property in Edinburgh’s Second New Town. By 1890 he was living at 69 Northumberland Street, a short walk from the Academy.

In 1882 he was elected a Fellow of the Royal Society of Edinburgh. His proposers were Peter Guthrie Tait, George Chrystal, Fleeming Jenkin and Alexander Dickson. In 1884 St Andrews University awarded him an honorary doctorate (LLD). In 1883 he co-founded the Edinburgh Mathematical Society and served as its first President.

He retired in 1904.

He died at 69 Northumberland Street in Edinburgh on 26 March 1914. He never married and had no children. He was buried with his parents in Wellshill Cemetery in Perth on 28 March. The grave lies on the boundary between the central and east section, facing east.

In 1923 his brother Robert Mackay donated 52 ancient mathematical books previously owned by John to St Andrews University. These are now known as the Mackay Collection.

== Publications ==
- Arithmetical Exercises (1869)
- Elements of Euclid (1884, enlarged and reprinted 1888)
- Arithmetic: Theoretical and Practical (1899)
