= David Kinnear Thomson =

Scottish businessman

- Born: 26 March 1910; Perth, Scotland
- Died: 27 December 1992 (aged 82)
- Education: Perth Academy; Strathallan School
- Occupations: Peter Thomson (Perth) Limited (chairman and president)
- Father: Peter Thomson

David Kinnear Thomson CBE, DL, TD, CStJ (26 March 1910 – 27 December 1992) was the chairman and president of Peter Thomson (Perth) Limited, whisky blenders and exporters based in Perth, Scotland. He served as Lord Provost of Perth from 1966 to 1972 and chairman of Tayside Health Board from 1973 to 1977.

== Early life ==
David Thomson was born in Perth the son of Peter Thomson, whisky blender, and Jessie Kinnear. He was educated at Perth Academy and Strathallan School in Scotland.

== Career ==
On the death of his father in 1939, David Thomson became the chairman of Peter Thomson (Perth) Limited. The company was known for its blend of Scotch whisky called Beneagles. He served as a major with the Royal Army Service Corps during the Second World War and was held as a Prisoner of War. On his return, Thomson, was awarded a Territorial Decoration and appointed a Member of the Order of the British Empire.

In 1949 he became a member of Perth Local Authority a position he held until 1972. Thomson was appointed a justice of the peace serving Perth and Kinross in 1955. From 1966 to 1972 he served as the Lord Provost of Perth, a Deputy Lieutenant and appointed an honorary sheriff. In 1972 he was appointed a Commander of the Order of the British Empire.

From 1972 to 1976 Thomson was a director of the Scottish Transport Group and between 1973 and 1981 a director of Scottish Opera. He was chairman of the Perth Festival of the Arts from 1973 to 1985. Between 1973 and 1977 he was chairman of Tayside Health Board. Thomson was also a member of the court at the University of Dundee from 1975 to 1979 and chairman of the Scottish Licence Trade between 1981 and 1982.

In 1982 he was appointed a Freeman of Perth and Kinross District and in 1984 a Commander of the Order of Saint John.

=== DK Thomson Award ===
The David K Thomson Award was instigated by Thomson in 1973 to recognise outstanding achievement by Perth people or organisations. Notable recipients of the award include three-time world champion golfer Jessie Valentine in 1999 and Joan Knight, artistic director at Perth Theatre, in 1982. The Award was administered by a trust established at Thomson's request to mark his retiral as Lord Provost.

== Honours and awards ==
- Territorial Decoration, 1945.
- On 9 October 1945 Thomson was appointed as a Member of the Most Excellent Order of the British Empire
- Deputy Lieutenant, 1966–1972.
- In the 1972 New Year Honours list Thomson was appointed as a Commander of the Most Excellent Order of the British Empire.
- In August 1972 Thomson was appointed as an Officer of The Most Venerable Order of the Hospital of Saint John of Jerusalem
- Freeman, Perth and Kinross District, 1982.
- In 1984 Thomson was appointed as a Commander of The Most Venerable Order of the Hospital of Saint John of Jerusalem
