= Peter Thomson (Perth) Limited =

Peter Thomson (Perth) Limited was a Perth, Scotland-based independent whisky blender, bottler and wine merchants established in 1908. In 1983 the firm was bought by Sir Reo Stakis to complement the Haddows off-licence chain and wholesale business.

The company was known for producing Beneagles blended Scotch whisky.

== History ==
In 1897, Alexander Thomson & Sons was established as a family grocery and wine merchant business in Perth. In 1911, they were located on the Old High Street. A son, Peter, bought one of the stores on the High Street which he had managed since 1906, and established Peter Thomson (Perth) Limited in 1908.

Throughout the 1920s the company developed a mail order business selling their own blends of scotch whisky. The founder, Peter Thomson, died in 1939 and the business was passed to his son, David Kinnear Thomson. Throughout the Second World War, David Thomson was absent from the business as he was serving with the military and subsequently held as a prisoner of war.

After the war the wholesale and agency side of the business were expanded. Retail grocery and wine trading were also developed but ceased trading in 1973 with the closure of the remaining shop on Perth High Street.

In 1983 the company was acquired by Reo Stakis to complement the Haddows off-licence chain and wholesale business. At the time the firm was the agent for a strong portfolio of drinks brands in Scotland including, The Macallan single malt, Beefeater Gin and Bertola sherry. The company also had a strong market for its own blended whiskey called Beneagles. The firm sold its own range of miniature ceramic bottles, containing Beneagles, which depicted Scottish culture; novelty bottle shapes included the Loch Ness Monster, curling stones and animals. The ceramic miniatures have become collector's items as they were made by some of Britain's finest potteries.

In 1985 Scottish and Newcastle Breweries acquired Peter Thomson (Perth) Limited and Thomson Haddow from Sir Reo Stakis. The whiskey interest of Peter Thomson (Perth) Limited was incorporated into Charles Mackinlay and Co based in Leith, which was the sister company of Waverley Vintners Limited, owned by Scottish and Newcastle. Later that year Charles Mackinlay and Co was acquired by Invergordon Distilleries and in 1993 they were bought by Whyte & Mackay.
