= James Bisset (artist) =

Scottish-born English artist and manufacturer

- James Bisset in 1792
- Born: 1762
- Died: 17 August 1832; Leamington Spa

James Bisset (ca. 1762 – 17 August 1832) was a Scottish-born artist, manufacturer, writer, collector, art dealer and poet who spent most of his life in and around Birmingham, England.

Bisset was born in Perth, the son of a merchant who invested the Baltic flax trade but had fallen upon hard times. He was educated at Perth Academy until 1776 when he moved at the age of 13 to Birmingham, where his brother had established himself as a merchant. At the age of 15 Bisset obtained an apprenticeship with a Birmingham japanner, and by 1785 was listed in a local trade directory as a painter of miniatures. His invention of a method of painting on the inside of convex glasses enabled him to develop a successful business making ornamental goods and marry the daughter of a local landowner, and the early years of the nineteenth century saw him diversifying into medal-production and art dealing.

In 1789, he was instrumental in establishing one of Birmingham's first committees to provide watchmen (a form of early policing), in the St Paul's district.

In 1808 Bisset moved to a large house in New Street where he established a museum and picture gallery – Birmingham's first – that displayed everything from paintings and medals to stuffed wildlife and "works of savage nations". In 1813 he sold two paintings by Canaletto and moved to nearby Leamington Spa, where his museum was re-established by his wife Dolly.

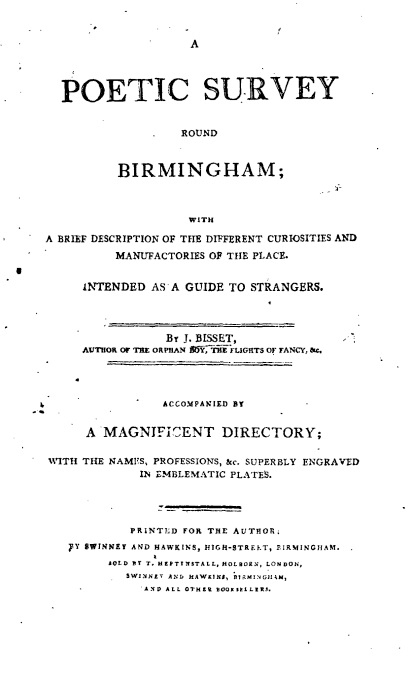
Frontispiece to A poetic survey round Birmingham (1800)

Bisset was a notable figure in Birmingham's cultural and commercial life, a prominent member of the Birmingham Book Club and a composer of much published verse. His most notable work is his 1800 Poetic survey round Birmingham, with a brief description of the different curiosities and manufactures of the place, accompanied with a magnificent directory, with the names and professions, &c. superbly engraved in emblematic plates – a directory of Birmingham trades at the time of the town's revolutionary industrial expansion, written in heroic verse and intended as a "grand tour" of the "works of genius" of a "seat of the arts".
