= William Thomson (mathematician) =

(1856–1947) Scottish mathematician

Sir William Thomson
- Born: 31 December 1856; Kirkton of Mailler, Perthshire, Scotland
- Died: 6 August 1947 (aged 90); Simonstown, South Africa
- Education: University of Edinburgh
- Occupations: Professor of Mathematics, university administrator
- Spouse: Annie Catherine van der Riet (married 1884)
- Children: 2
- Honours: Knighted by King George V

Sir William Thomson FRSE LLD (1856–1947) was a 19th/20th century Scottish mathematician and physicist primarily working as a university administrator in South Africa.

== Life ==
He was born on New Year's Eve, 31 December 1856, in the village of Kirkton of Mailler in Perthshire. He was educated at Perth Academy then studied mathematics and physics at the University of Edinburgh. He graduated with a BSc and MA in 1878 and began assisting in lectures at the university.

In 1882, aged 26, he was elected a Fellow of the Royal Society of Edinburgh. His proposers were George Chrystal, Peter Guthrie Tait, Alexander Crum Brown and Sir William Turner.

In 1883 he succeeded Prof George Gordon as Professor of Mathematics at Stellenbosch University in Cape Colony.

In 1895 he succeeded Rev James Cameron as University Registrar at the University of the Cape of Good Hope. In 1918 he transferred to the same role in the newly created University of South Africa and in 1922 moved to the University of the Witwatersrand.

He was knighted by King George V in 1922 for services to university education.

He retired in 1928 and died in Simonstown near Cape Town on 6 August 1947.

== Family ==
In 1884 he married Annie Catherine van der Riet. They had two daughters.

== Publications ==
- Mensuration in 9th edition of Encyclopædia Britannica (1878)
- Introduction to Determinants (1881)
- Algebra for the Use of Schools and Colleges (1886)
- Textbook of Geometrical Deductions (1891)
- Elementary Algebra (1901)
