= Neil Gow (microbiologist) =

British microbiologist (born 1957)

Neil Gow FRS FRSE FMedSci FRSB
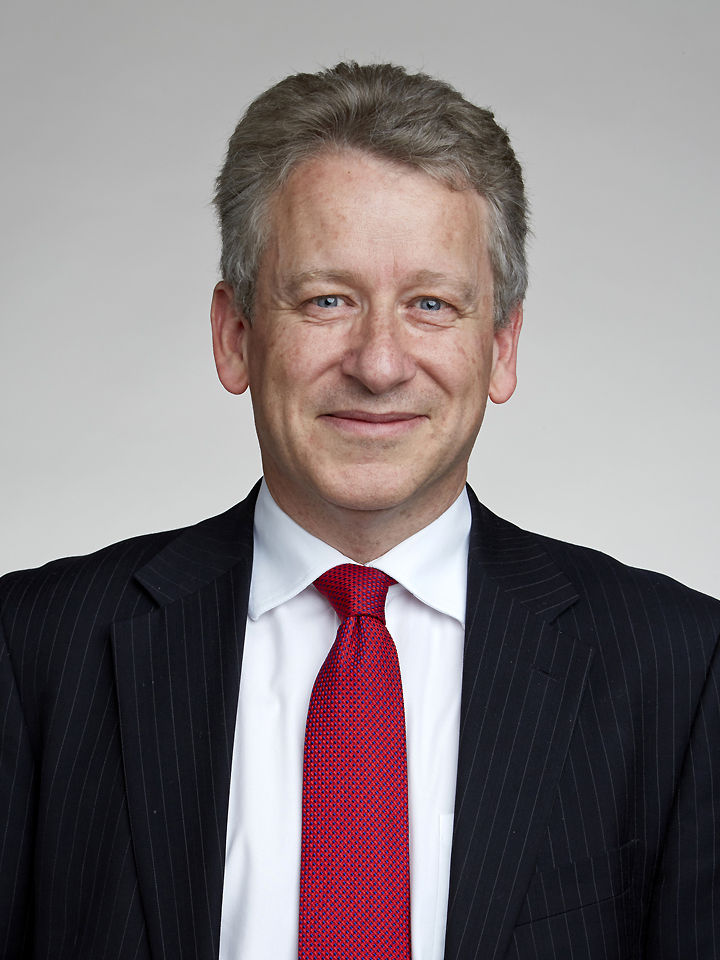
- Gow in 2016
- Born: 30 November 1957 (age 68); Tezpur, India
- Education: Madras College; Perth Academy; University of Edinburgh (BSc); University of Aberdeen (PhD)
- Scientific career
- Fields: Microbiology; Mycology; Immunology; Cell biology
- Workplaces: University of Exeter; University of Aberdeen
- Thesis: Growth, physiology and ultrastructure of the pathogenic fungus Candida albicans (1982)
- Doctoral advisor: Graham W. Gooday
- Website: www.abdn.ac.uk/ims/profiles/n.gow

Neil Andrew Robert Gow (born 30 November 1957) is a British microbiologist who is a professor of microbiology and deputy vice chancellor at the University of Exeter. Previously he served at the University of Aberdeen for 38 years and retains an honorary chair there.

== Education ==
Gow was educated Madras College and Perth Academy. He studied at the University of Edinburgh and the University of Aberdeen where he was awarded a PhD in 1982 for research on the pathogenic fungus Candida albicans supervised by Graham Gooday.

== Research and career ==
Gow's research career has been in the field of fungal biology and medical mycology. He is known for his discoveries in fungal biology and genetics, morphogenesis and pathogenesis. His studies of how the cell walls of fungal pathogenic species is assembled, responds to antifungal antibiotics and is recognised by the human immune system directly impacts on the design and use of antifungal drugs, diagnostics and immunotherapies for fungal diseases.

After his PhD, Gow worked in Denver before returning to Aberdeen, where he has developed a team that has recently become a Medical Research Council (MRC) Centre for Medical Mycology and is one of the largest centres in this field worldwide. He has helped co-ordinate UK training and research in medical mycology and has acted as President of the British Mycological Society, the International Society for Human and Animal Mycology (ISHAM) and the Microbiology Society.

=== Awards and honours ===
Gow has received several awards for his research, he was elected a Fellow of the Academy of Medical Sciences (FMedSci) in 2015, the Royal Society of Edinburgh (FRSE) in 2001 and the American Academy of Microbiology. He was elected a Fellow of the Royal Society (FRS) in 2016 and a Fellow of the Royal Society of Biology (FRSB).
