= William Keiller =

Scottish born anatomist

William Keiller FRCSEd
- Born: Auchendinny House, Penicuik, Scotland
- Died: 22 February 1931 (aged 69); Galveston, Texas
- Education: Montrose Academy, Perth Academy, University of Edinburgh
- Occupation: Professor of Anatomy
- Known for: Anatomy teaching, Anatomy illustrations
- Medical career
- Institutions: University of Texas Medical Branch at Galveston
- Notable works: Nerve Tracts of the Brain and Cord

William Keiller (4 July 1861 – 22 February 1931) was a Scottish born anatomist who trained in anatomy at the Edinburgh Extramural School of Medicine and was appointed as the first Professor of Anatomy at the University of Texas Medical Branch (UTMB) at Galveston, a post he held for 40 years. He served as Dean of the UTMB Medical School and as President of the Texas Medical Association. Many of his anatomical drawings and paintings are preserved and displayed at the Blocker History of Medicine collection at UTMB Moody Medical Library.

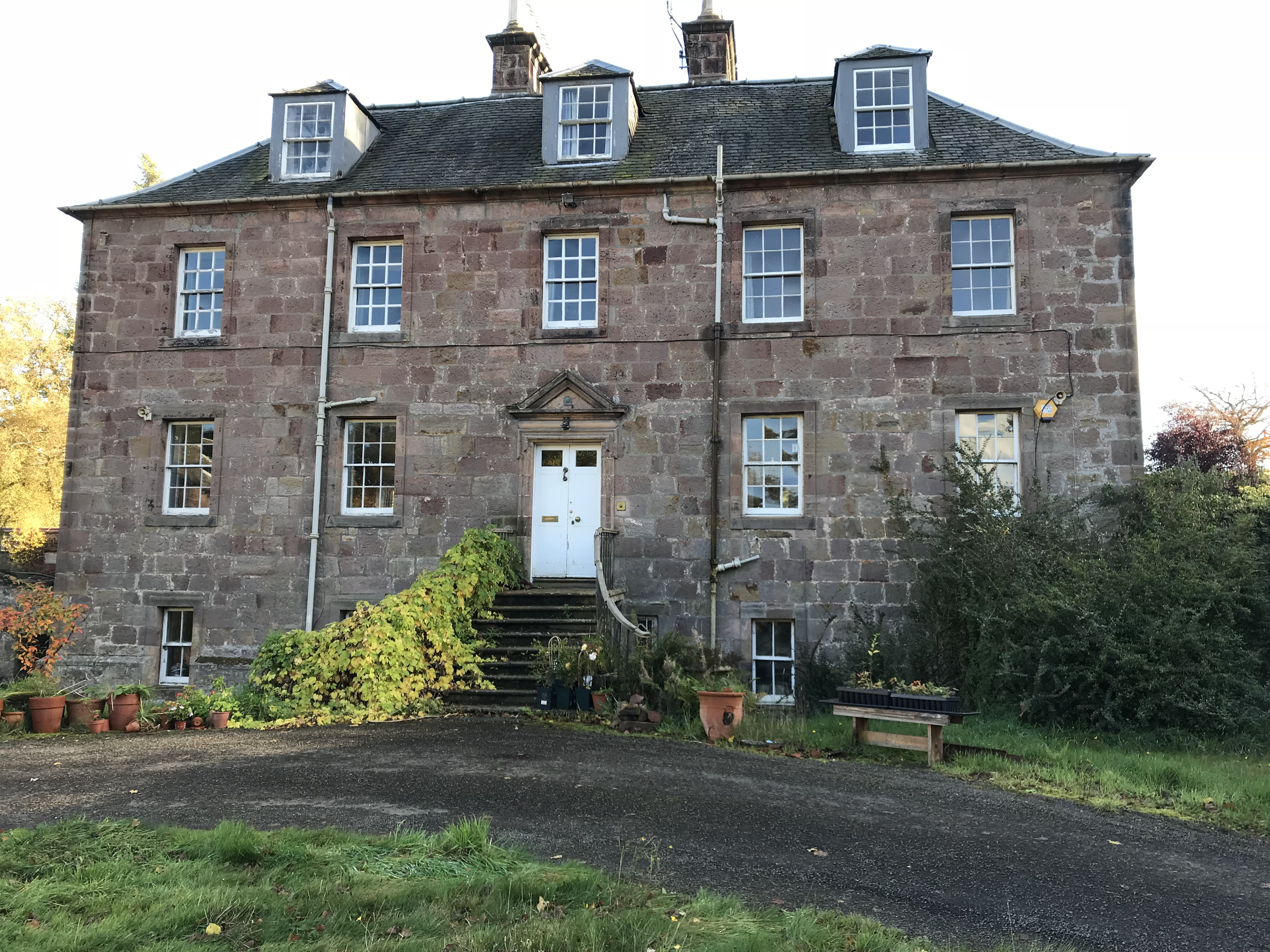
Auchendinny House, Midlothian, Scotland

== Early life ==
William Keiller was born in Auchendinny House, Penicuik, Scotland, on 4 July 1861. He was the son of Mathewson Keiller (1805–1876) and Hannah Napier, who married in Montrose in 1865. He went to school at Montrose Academy (aged 10–11) then to Perth Academy (aged 11–15) before matriculating in Arts at the University of Edinburgh in 1877 at the age of 16 and graduating MA in 1881.

== Career in Edinburgh ==
He then studied at the Edinburgh Extramural School of Medicine, enrolling as a candidate for the Triple Qualification in 1881. He attended classes mainly at Surgeons' Hall, the Royal Infirmary of Edinburgh and between 1887-88 showed an early interest in anatomy acting as part time student demonstrator in anatomy at Surgeons' Hall.

In 1888 he qualified in medicine having passed the examination for the Triple Qualification, awarded jointly by the Royal College of Physicians of Edinburgh, the Royal College of Surgeons of Edinburgh and the Faculty of Physicians and Surgeons of Glasgow. His first medical post was as assistant medical officer at the Provident Dispensary, which had been opened by Sophia Jex-Blake in 1878 at 73 Grove Street, Edinburgh. In 1885 the Dispensary opened a small number of hospital beds and changed its name to the Edinburgh Hospital and Dispensary for Women and Children. In addition to his post as assistant medical officer, he held posts as house surgeon in the Royal Infirmary of Edinburgh and demonstrator in pathology at Edinburgh University under Dr Alexander Bruce. Keiller then became physician for Diseases of Women in the Hospital and Dispensary which later became Bruntsfield Hospital. In July 1890 he was appointed Lecturer in Anatomy at the Edinburgh College of Medicine for Women. He was chloroformist at the Edinburgh Dental Hospital.

In 1890, having passed the necessary examination, he was elected a Fellow of the Royal College of Surgeons of Edinburgh (FRCSEd) and was appointed lecturer in anatomy at the University of Edinburgh.

The following year he responded to an advertisement in the British Medical Journal for a post at the University of Texas Medical Branch, and was appointed as its first Professor of Anatomy.

== Professor of Anatomy ==
Keiller taught anatomy at Galveston for forty years, with a particular interest in neuroanatomy. His initial brief was to set up a curriculum of anatomy teaching ‘after the Edinburgh method’ and to establish an anatomy museum and laboratory.

In his early years he contributed two articles based on his previous clinical experience in Edinburgh. His article on the use of traction forceps in obstetrics described his experience with their use at the Edinburgh Hospital and Dispensary. The use of such forceps had been popularised in Edinburgh and then throughout Britain by James Young Simpson, Professor of Midwifery in Edinburgh. His experience in Edinburgh as a chloroformist led to an interest in anesthetic techniques and he was an early advocate of spinal anesthesia. Keiller's 1900 paper on the use of cocaine in spinal anaesthesia was published within a year of the description of the first planned operation under spinal anesthesia by August Bier in Germany. Keiller also delivered a paper entitled "Cocaine Anaesthesia by Lumbar Puncture" in 1900.

When he arrived, the facilities were modest and he set out to create a fully equipped anatomy department and to establish an anatomy museum, which could be used for teaching and which was based on the Edinburgh model. Within a few years he had expanded anatomy teaching so that students dissected the entire human body, attended daily lectures and created large scale anatomical drawings and wet specimen preparations. He also introduced to Galveston the use of formalin for the preservation of bodies. He was a gifted draftsman and used this skill to produce blackboard drawings during his lectures. A more permanent legacy is his collection of colored anatomical sketches and colored paintings, some of which were life scale. Around two hundred of these drawings came under the possession of Truman G. Blocker Jr. History of Medicine Moody Medical Library collections at UTMB.

This collection of his anatomy drawings, colored and clearly labelled gives insights into the teaching of anatomy at the beginning of the twentieth century. It was digitised and became available online.

In 1894 he wrote to the editor of the New York Medical Journal claiming that drawings and diagrams were superior to photographs in teaching anatomy. "Photographs teach nothing that could not be equally well or better taught by a good diagram . . " he wrote, "... how often is the very point of most importance in the illustration completely obscured by the photograph.!"

Keiller was joint author of Textbook of Anatomy (1899), edited by Frederick Gerrish, to which he contributed chapters on the nervous system and sensory organs. This became available online. In 1927 he published a textbook, Nerve Tracts of the Brain and Cord, which received very favourable reviews and proved popular.

Between 1922 and 1926 he served as Dean of the School of Medicine at UTMB.

== Awards and honors ==
Keiller was President of the Texas State Medical Association (1926), President of the Texas Neurological Society (1931) and a member of the Galveston County Medical Society, the American Medical Association, and the International Association of Medical Museums.

The Keiller building at UTMB is named for him. In 1916 he was elected an honorary fellow of the Texas Surgical Society. He has been described as "the leading American anatomist of his day".

== Personal life and death ==
On 6 March 1883, he married Eliza Henrietta McLaughlin (1857–1894). They had two daughters, Mabel Mathewson Keiller (1884–1972), and Violet Hannah Keiller (1887–1958), Violet was born in Edinburgh, graduated from UTMB in 1914 and worked as pathologist at UTMB and at Houston.

The year after the death of his first wife he married Jane Julia McLaughlin (1860–1935) on 27 June 1895. They had two more children, Eliza Margaret (1896–1966) and Thomas Mitchell (1898–1981). From 1922 until his death he lived at 1409 Market St, Galveston. William Keiller died in Galveston on 22 February 1931.

== Selected publications ==
- Keiller, W. (1891). "Note on Some Modifications of Barnes' Caoutchouc Dilators". Edinburgh Medical Journal. 37 (1): 33–35. PMC 5275277.
- Keiller’s letter on the Galveston Quarantine, 12 August 1905, Texas state journal of medicine, published by Austin: Texas Medical Association, 1906.
- Keiller, W (1906). "Anatomy of a Case of Cystic Adenoma of the Thyroid Gland". Annals of Surgery. 43 (3): 326.2–334. doi:10.1097/00000658-190603000-00002. PMC 1426154. PMID 17861765.
- Nerve tracts of the brain and cord: Anatomy, physiology, applied neurology. 1927. New York: The Macmillan Company.
