= Ronald Foote Robertson =

Scottish physician

Ronald Foote Robertson CBE PRCPE (27 December 1920–11 April 1991) was a 20th-century Scottish physician who served as president of the British Medical Association 1983/4 and president of the Royal College of Physicians of Edinburgh for the period 1976 to 1979. He was official Physician in Scotland to Queen Elizabeth II. He was affectionately known as Ronnie Robertson.

== Life ==
He was born in Aberdeen on 27 December 1920, the son of Mary Foot and Thomas Robertson. He was educated at Perth Academy, where he was dux, then studied medicine at the University of Edinburgh graduating with an MB ChB in 1945. He was a clinical tutor at the Edinburgh Royal Infirmary and gained his doctorate (MD) in 1953.

He was Consultant Physician at both the Deaconess and Leith Hospital then returned to Edinburgh Royal Infirmary, where he remained for the rest of his career. He became a Fellow of the Royal College of Physicians of Edinburgh in 1953 and in 1976 succeeded John Crofton as their President. He was succeeded in turn in 1979 by John Anderson Strong.

He served numerous senior medical roles and was the Queen's official physician for eight years, during which time he was created a Commander of the Order of the British Empire (CBE) in 1980. His less known roles include advisor to the Scottish Home and Health Department, to various life insurance companies and to the Merchant Company of Edinburgh.

In 1959 Robertson was elected a member of the Harveian Society of Edinburgh and served as President in 1986. He was elected to the Aesculapian Club in 1969.

He died on 11 April 1991.

== Family ==
He married Dorothy Tweedy Wilkinson in 1949, together they had three daughters, one of which is deceased.

== Artistic recognition ==
His portrait by Ian Hughes is held by the Royal College of Physicians of Edinburgh.

== Publications ==
- Some Aspects of Neurology (1968)
- Liver Disease (1972)
