= Joseph Anderson =

Joseph Anderson may refer to:

== Politics ==
- Joe Anderson (politician) (born 1958), mayor of Liverpool
- Joseph Anderson (South Australian politician) (1876–1947), and accountant, real estate
- Joseph C. Anderson (1830–1891), member of the Kansas Territorial Legislature, US
- Joseph F. Anderson (born 1949), U.S. federal judge
- Joseph H. Anderson (1800–1870), U.S. representative from New York
- Joseph H. Anderson (Wisconsin politician) (1893–1969), Wisconsin state assemblyman
- Joseph Anderson (Tennessee politician) (1757–1837), Tennessee senator
- Joseph E. Anderson (1873−1937), Illinois representative

== Military ==
- Joseph Anderson (British Army officer) (1790–1877) and politician, Victoria,(Australia
- Joseph Anderson (U.S. Army general) (born 1959)
- Joseph Anderson (U.S. Army captain) (1826–1897)
- Joseph T. Anderson (born 1946), US Marine Corps general

== Sportsmen ==
- Joe Anderson (boxer) (1869–1943), 'All England' champion in 1897
- Joseph Anderson (cricketer) (1878–1961), Scottish cricketer and sports outfitter
- Joe Anderson (Scottish footballer) (1895–1959), for Burnley F.C.
- Joe Anderson (rugby league) (1928–2014), English, 1950s and 1960s
- Joe Anderson (Australian footballer) (born 1988), Carlton Football Club
- Joseph Anderson (American football) (born 1988), New York Jets
- Joe Anderson (footballer, born 1989)
- Joey Anderson (born 1998), American ice hockey forward
- Joe Anderson (footballer, born 2001), Sunderland, England

== Other ==
- Joe Anderson (Aboriginal activist) at Salt Pan Creek, New South Wales, Australia
- Joe Anderson (actor) (born 1982), British actor
- Joseph Anderson (antiquarian) (1832–1916), Scotland
- Joseph Anderson (Mormon) (1889–1992)
- Joseph B. Anderson (born 1943), US executive
- Joseph Gaudentius Anderson (1865–1927), US Catholic bishop
- Joseph Horatio Anderson, architect in Annapolis, Maryland, US
- Joseph R. Anderson (1813–1892), US civil engineer and US Civil War officer
- Joseph L. Anderson, film director, writer, and producer, known for Spring Night, Summer Night (1967)
