= Peter Gardner =

Peter Gardner may refer to:

- Peter Gardner (hurdler) (1925–1996)
- Peter Gardner (rower) (born 1974)
- Peter Gardner (RAF officer) (1918–1984), flying ace in the Royal Air Force during the Second World War
- Pete Gardner (born 1964), American actor

== See also ==
- Peter Gardiner (disambiguation)
