= Whitehaugh Oval =

Cricket ground in Scotland

Coordinates: 55°50′57.20″N 04°24′23.26″W

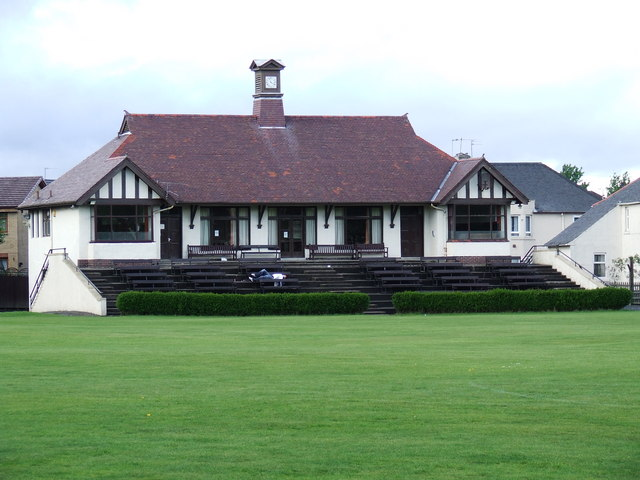
- The pavilion at Whitehaugh in 2007

Ground information
- Location: Paisley, Renfrewshire, Scotland
- Home club: Kelburne CC
- Establishment: 1899

Team information
Scotland	(1947–1964)
- As of 23 July 2020; Source: CricketArchive

Whitehaugh Oval is a cricket ground in Paisley, Renfrewshire, Scotland. It has been the home ground of Kelburne Cricket Club since their previous ground at Blackhall was lost to development in 1898. The new ground was opened with a match against West of Scotland on 29 April 1899.

The first Scotland match held on the ground came in 1947 when they played a minor match against the touring South Africans. Scotland first played a first-class match there in 1952 against Ireland. The ground held five further first-class matches, the last of which saw Scotland play Ireland in 1960. Other teams to visit in first-class matches included Lancashire, Yorkshire and the touring Indians.

== Records ==
=== First-class ===
- Highest team total: 489 all out by Scotland v Ireland, 1954
- Lowest team total: 126 all out by Ireland v Scotland, 1952
- Highest individual innings: 153 not out by Polly Umrigar for Indians v Scotland, 1959
- Best bowling in an innings: 7 for 84 by Mike Kerrigan for Scotland v Ireland, 1960
- Best bowling in a match: 11 for 144 by Malcolm Hilton for Lancashire v Scotland, 1956
