= Perth, Scotland =

City in central Scotland

Coordinates: 56°23′45″N 03°26′00″W

Perth: Scottish Gaelic: Peairt
- City and administrative centre
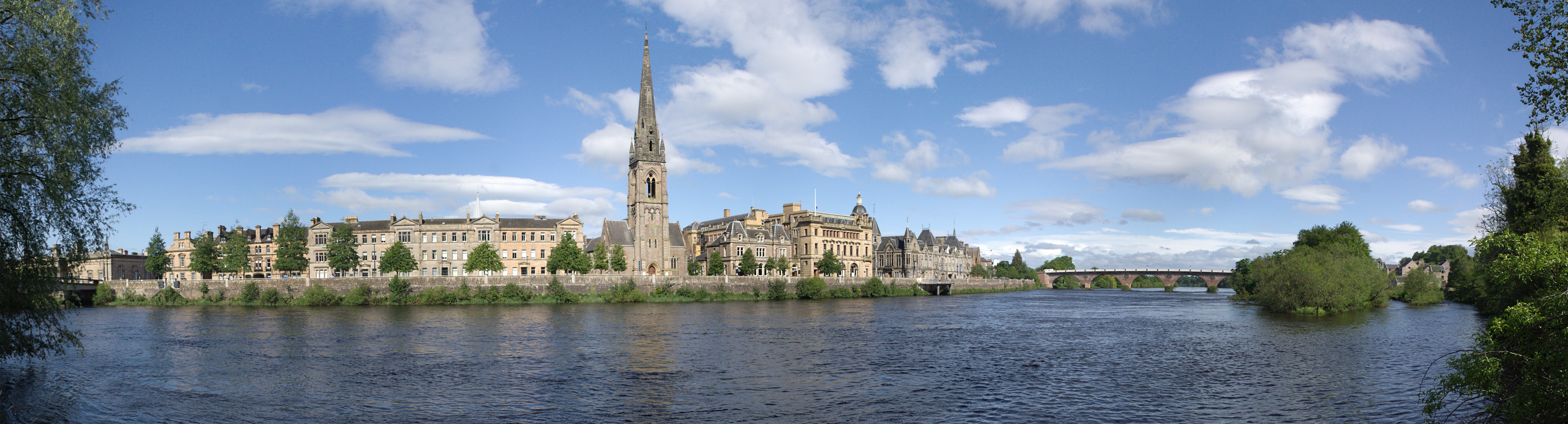
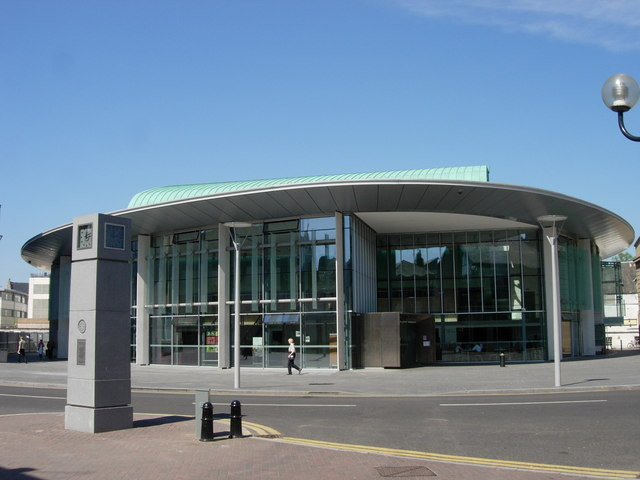
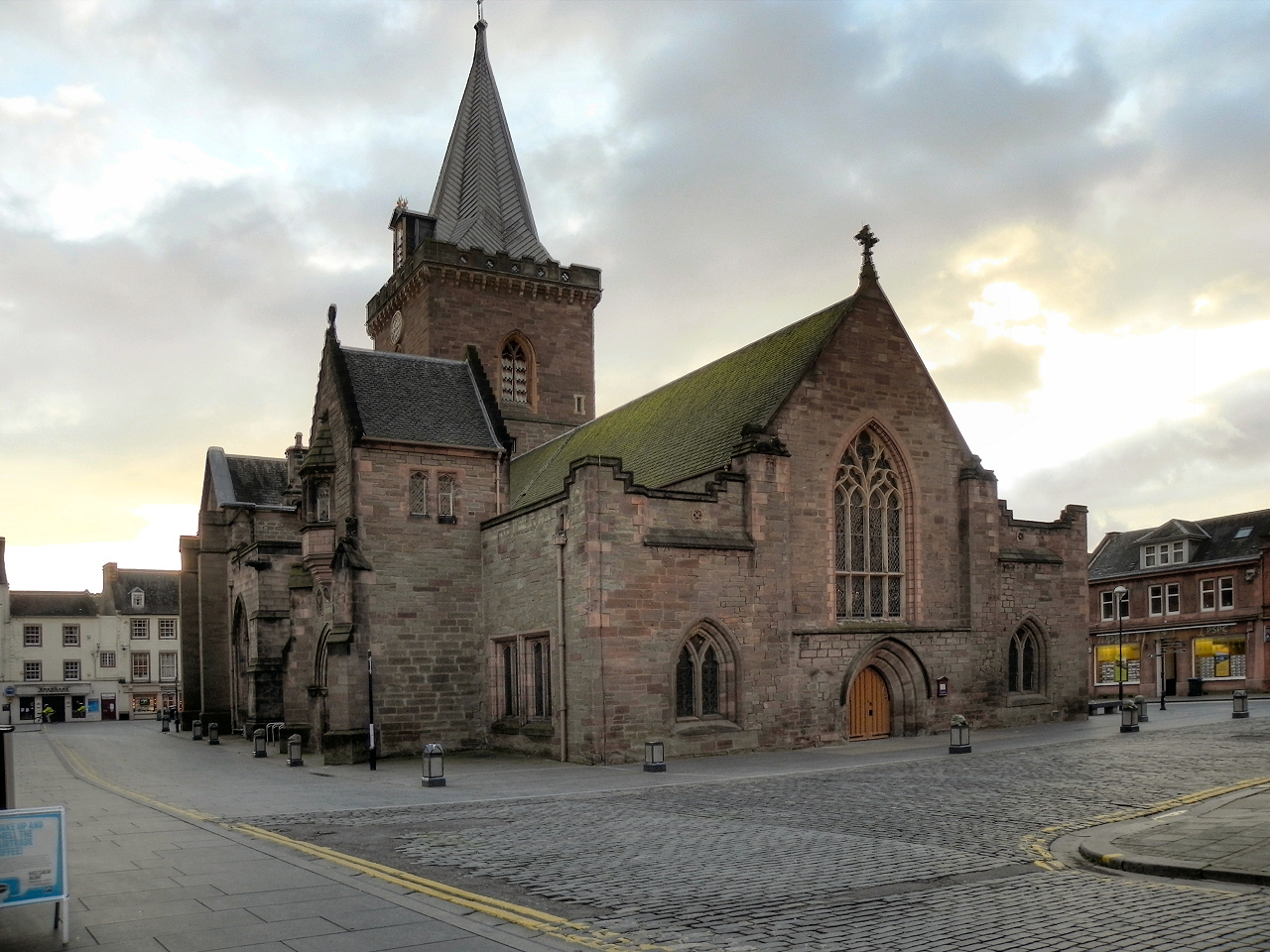
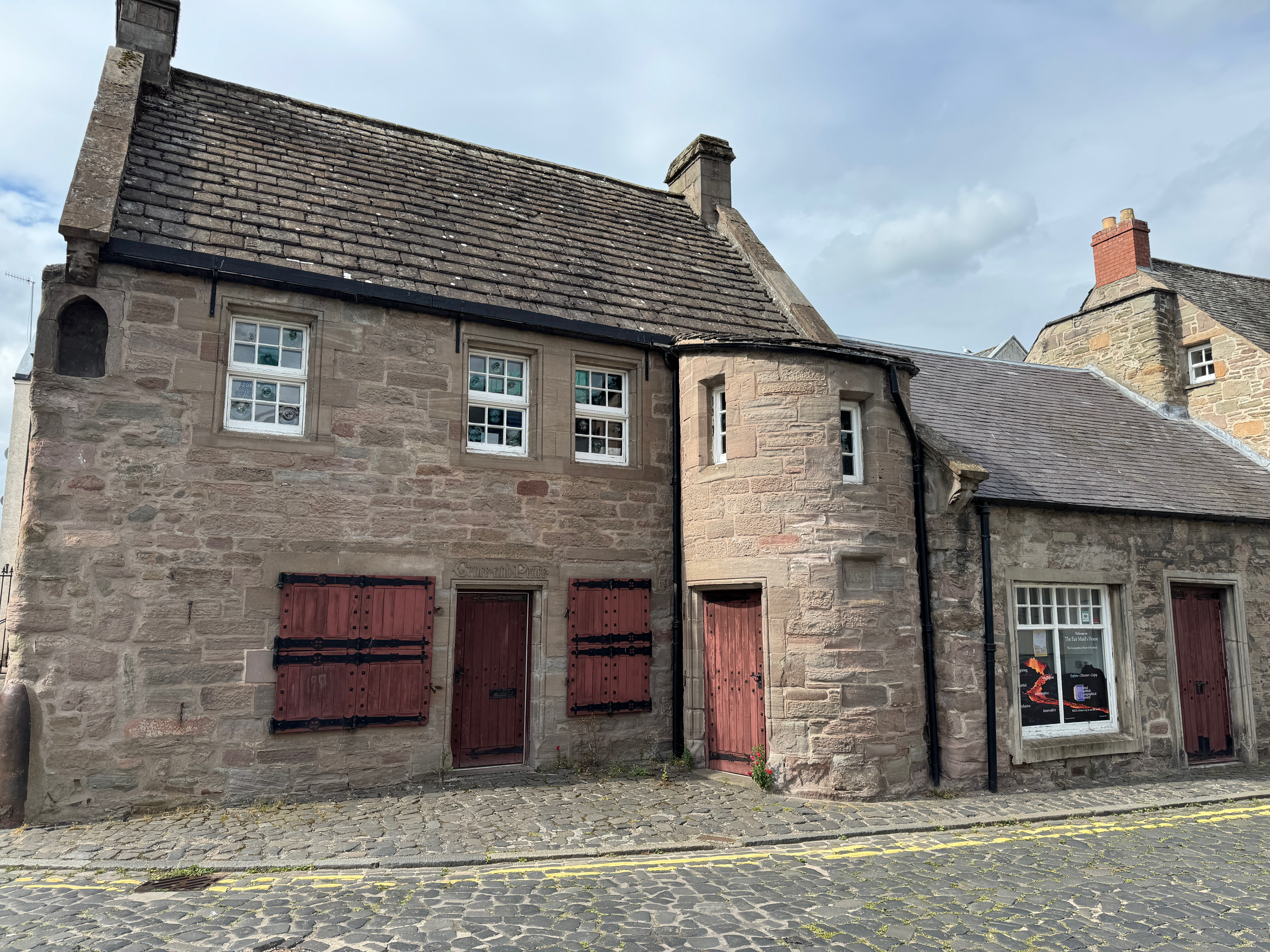
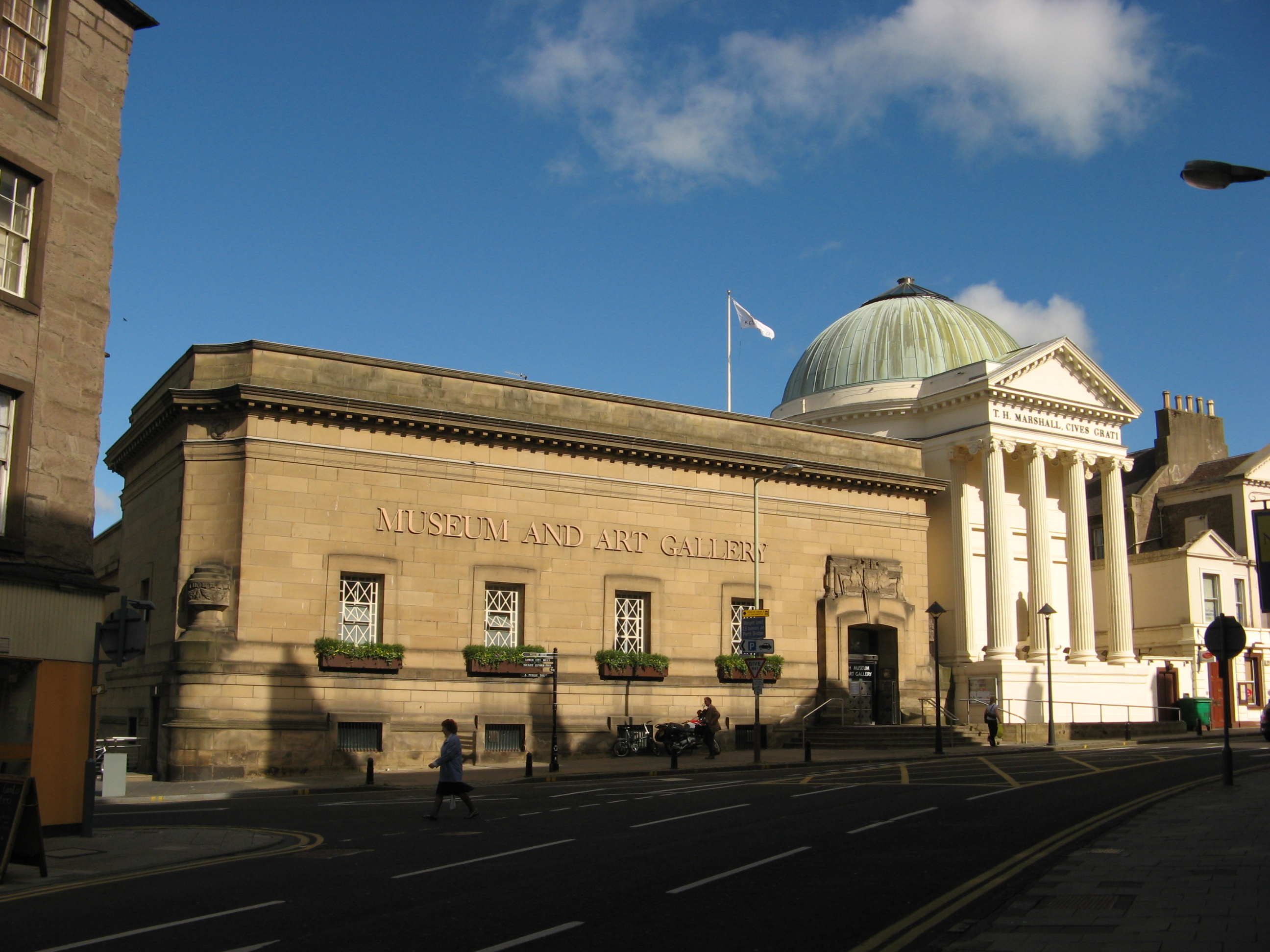
- Skyline of Perth's Tay Street Perth Concert Hall St John's Kirk Fair Maid's House Perth Art Gallery

- Coat of arms

- Location within Perth and Kinross
- Area: 17.5 km^{2} (6.8 sq mi)
- Population: 47,893 (2022)
  - Density: 2,737/km^{2} (7,090/sq mi)
- OS grid reference: NO115235
- Council area: Perth and Kinross
- Lieutenancy area: Perth and Kinross
- Country: Scotland
- Sovereign state: United Kingdom
- Post town: PERTH
- Postcode district: PH
- Dialling code: 01738
- Police: Scotland
- Fire: Scottish
- Ambulance: Scottish
- UK Parliament: Perth and Kinross-shire
- Scottish Parliament: Perthshire North; Perthshire South and Kinross-shire

Perth (Note: /ˈpɜːrθ/; Scottish: /ˈpɛrθ/; Scottish Gaelic: Peairt [pʰɛrˠʃtʲ]) is a city located on the banks of the River Tay in Scotland. It is the administrative centre of Perth and Kinross council area and is the historic county town of Perthshire. It had a population of 47,893 in 2022.

There has been a settlement at Perth since prehistoric times. It is a natural mound raised slightly above the flood plain of the Tay. The area surrounding the modern city is known to have been occupied ever since the arrival of Mesolithic hunter-gatherers. Nearby Neolithic standing stones and circles date from about 4000 BC, a period that followed the introduction of farming into the area. Close to Perth is Scone Abbey, which formerly housed the Stone of Scone (also known as the Stone of Destiny), on which the King of Scots were traditionally crowned. This enhanced the early importance of the city, and Perth became known as a "capital" of Scotland due to the frequent residence there of the royal court. Royal burgh status was given to the city by King William the Lion in the early 12th century. The city became one of the richest burghs in the country, engaging in trade with France, the Low Countries, and the Baltic countries, and importing goods such as Spanish silk and French wine.

The Scottish Reformation had a strong impact on the city: the Houses of the Greyfriars and Blackfriars, two of Perth's four monastic institutions at the time of the Reformation, were ransacked after a sermon given by John Knox in St John's Kirk in 1559. The 1701 Act of Settlement brought about Jacobite uprisings. The city was occupied by Jacobite supporters on three occasions: in 1689, 1715 and 1745. The founding of Perth Academy in 1760 helped to bring major industries to the city, including the production of linen, leather, bleach and whisky. Perth was fortuitously placed to become a key transport centre with the coming of the railways, and its first station was built in 1848.

Perth has been known as "The Fair City" since the publication of the novel Fair Maid of Perth by Scottish writer Sir Walter Scott in 1828. During the later medieval period the city was also called St John's Toun or Saint Johnstoun by its inhabitants—a reference to its principal church, which was dedicated to St John the Baptist. This name is preserved in the name of the city's football club, St Johnstone F.C. The city often refers to itself using the promotional nickname "Gateway to the Highlands", a reference to its location.

Today, Perth serves as a retail centre for the surrounding area, and in 2018 the city was named "Scotland's Food Town of 2018" by the Scottish Food Awards. Following the decline of the local whisky industry, the city diversified its economy, building on its long-established presence in the insurance industry to increase its standing in the banking industry.

== Etymology ==
The name Perth derives from a Pictish word for 'wood' or 'copse', related to the Welsh perth, meaning 'hedge' or 'thicket'. During much of the later medieval period, it was known colloquially by its Scots-speaking inhabitants as St John's Toun or Saint Johnstoun because the church at the centre of the parish was dedicated to St John the Baptist. Perth was referred to as St John's ton up until the mid-1600s with the name Perthia being reserved for the wider area. At this time, Perthia became Perth Shyre and St John's ton became known as Perth.

Perth's Pictish name, and some archaeological evidence, indicate that there must have been a settlement here from earlier times, probably at a point where a river crossing or crossings coincided with a slightly raised natural mound on the west bank of the Tay (which at Perth flows north–south), thus giving some protection for settlement from the frequent flooding. Finds in and around Perth show that it was occupied by the Mesolithic hunter-gatherers who arrived in the area more than 8,000 years ago. Nearby Neolithic standing stones and circles followed the introduction of farming from about 4000 BC, and a remarkably well preserved Bronze Age log boat dated to around 1000 BC was found in the mudflats of the River Tay at Carpow to the east of Perth.

== History ==
=== Early history ===
Perth developed from an initial plan of two parallel streets: High Street and South Street, linked by several vennels leading north and south. The names of these vennels have historic origins, and many—such as Cow Vennel and Fleshers' Vennel—recall the trades associated with their foundation. South Street was originally terminated at its eastern end by Gowrie House (site of today's Perth Sheriff Court). Upon its demolition in the early 19th century, direct access was granted to the river.

The presence of Scone two miles (3 km) northeast, the main royal centre of the Kingdom of Alba from at least the reign of Kenneth I (843–858), and later the site of the major Augustinian abbey of the same name founded by Alexander I (1107–1124), enhanced Perth's early importance. Perth was considered the effective capital of Scotland, due to the frequent residence of the royal court. Royal burgh status was awarded to the city by King William the Lion in the early 12th century. During the 12th and 13th centuries, Perth was one of the richest trading burghs in the kingdom (along with such places as Berwick-upon-Tweed, Aberdeen and Roxburgh), a residence of numerous craftsmen, organised into guilds (the Hammermen and Glovers, for example). Perth also carried out an extensive trade with France, The Low Countries and the Baltic Countries with luxury goods being brought back in return, such as Spanish silk and French pottery and wine.

Perth's low-lying situation at the highest tidal reach of the Tay and close to its confluence with the River Almond make it vulnerable to flooding. In the autumn of 1209 the town was inundated when the Tay and Almond burst their banks. The bridge over the Tay and the chapel of St. Mary that stood upon it were swept away and King William, his son Alexander and his brother David, Earl of Huntingdon had to be evacuated in a small boat.

King Edward I brought his armies to Perth in 1296, and with only a ditch for defence and little fortification, the city fell quickly. Stronger fortifications were quickly built by the English, and plans to wall the city took shape in 1304. They remained standing until Robert the Bruce's recapture of Perth in 1312. As part of a plan to make Perth a permanent English base within Scotland, Edward III of England made six monasteries in Perthshire and Fife pay for the construction of stone defensive walls, towers and fortified gates around the city in 1336. These defences were the strongest of any city in Scotland in the Middle Ages. The last remnant of the wall can be seen in Albert Close, near to the main entrance to the Royal George Hotel.

=== 15th–19th centuries ===
An 1832 map of Perth by James Gardner. It shows only one bridge (Perth Bridge) crossing the Tay. Tay Street had not yet been built, though some buildings exist on what would be its western side. St John's Kirk is marked

King James I of Scotland was assassinated in Perth in 1437, by followers of Walter Stewart, Earl of Atholl, at Blackfriars church.

In May 1559, John Knox instigated the Scottish Reformation at grass-roots level with a sermon against 'idolatry' in the burgh kirk of St John the Baptist. An inflamed mob quickly destroyed the altars in the kirk, and attacked the Houses of the Greyfriars and Blackfriars, and the Carthusian Priory. Scone Abbey was sacked shortly afterwards. The regent of infant Mary, Queen of Scots, her mother Marie de Guise, was successful in quelling the rioting but presbyterianism in Perth remained strong. Perth played a part in the Covenanting struggle and Perth was sacked for two days by Royalist troops after the Battle of Tippermuir in 1644. In 1651, Charles II was crowned at nearby Scone Abbey, the traditional site of the investiture of Kings of Scots. That same year, Oliver Cromwell came to Perth following his victory in the Battle of Dunbar and established a fortified citadel on the South Inch, one of five occupation forts built to control Scotland. The restoration of Charles II was not without incident, and with the Act of Settlement in 1701, came the Jacobite uprisings. The city was occupied by Jacobite soldiers in 1689, 1715 and 1745.

In 1760, Perth Academy was founded, and major industry came to the city, now with a population of 15,000. Linen, leather, bleached products and whisky were its major exports. Given its location, Perth was perfectly placed to become a key transport centre with the coming of the railways. The first railway station in Perth was built in 1848. Horse-drawn carriages became popular in the 1890s; they were quickly replaced by electric trams of Perth Corporation Tramways.

=== 20th and 21st centuries ===
Despite being a garrison city and undergoing major social and industrial developments during the First World War, Perth remained relatively unchanged. In 1829, with the settlement of the Swan River Colony, in Western Australia, Sir George Murray wanted it to be named Perth after the place where he was born. The ship Parmelia sailed to Australia to found the new settlement. The old Municipal Buildings were completed in 1881, although the Perth and Kinross District Council moved to the former head office of General Accident at No. 2 High Street in 1984.

Today, Perth serves as a retail centre for the surrounding area. This includes a main shopping centre—St John's Centre—along with a pedestrianised high street and many independent and specialist shops. The city also has "an embarrassing abundance of public houses". Main employers in the city now include Aviva, Royal Bank of Scotland and Scottish and Southern Energy.

== Governance ==
=== Representation ===
Perth forms part of the county constituency of Perth and Kinross-shire, electing one member of parliament (MP) to the House of Commons of the Parliament of the United Kingdom by the first past the post system. Pete Wishart of the Scottish National Party (SNP) is the MP for Perth and Kinross-shire.

For the purposes of the Scottish Parliament, Perth forms part of the constituencies of Perthshire North and Perthshire South and Kinross-shire. These two constituencies were created in 2011 as two of the nine constituencies within the Mid Scotland and Fife electoral region. Each constituency elects one Member of the Scottish Parliament (MSP) by the first past the post system of election, and the region elects seven additional members to produce a form of proportional representation. Perthshire North is currently represented by John Swinney (SNP) and Perthshire South and Kinross-shire is currently represented by Jim Fairlie (SNP).

=== Judicial system ===
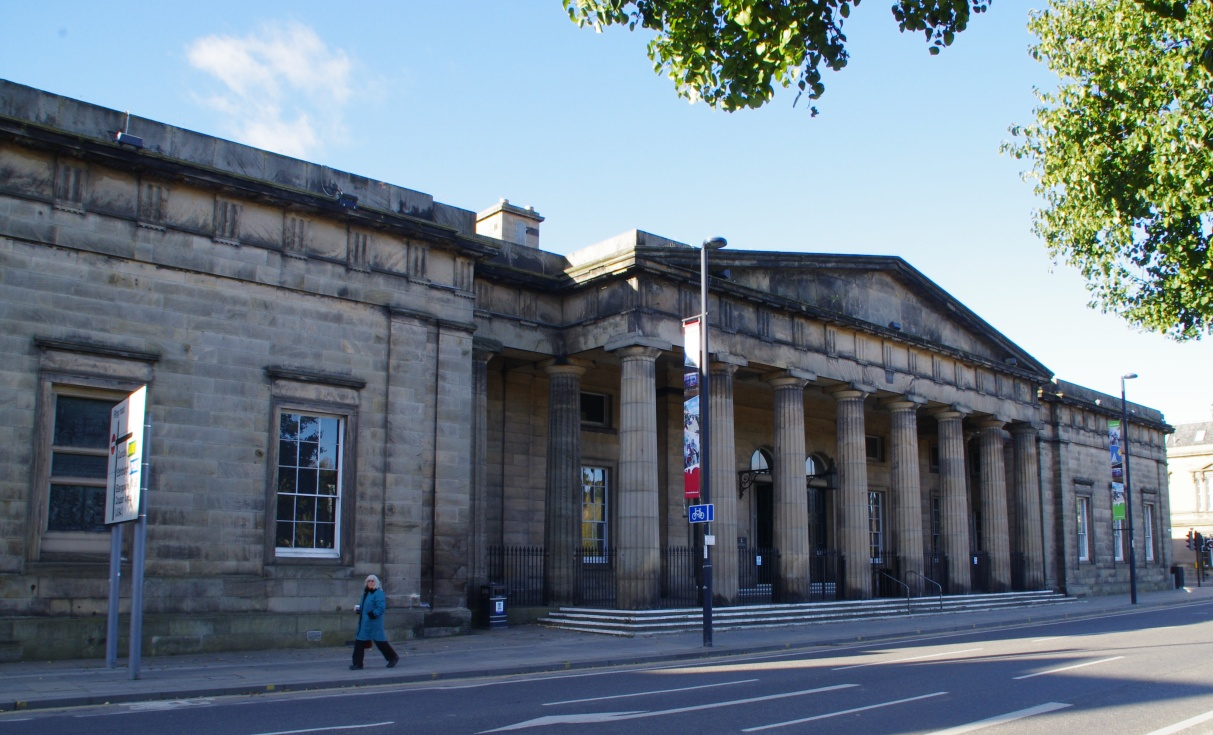
Perth Sheriff Court

Perth's Sheriff Court, on Tay Street, is a Category A listed building. The building was designed by London architect Sir Robert Smirke, built in 1819 and stands on the site of Gowrie House, the place where a plot to kill King James VI was hatched in 1600.

Perth is also home to a large prison, HM Prison Perth.

=== City status ===
The classic definition of Perth has been as a city. In the late 1990s, the UK Government and the devolved Scottish Executive re-examined the definition of a city and produced a list of approved cities, from which Perth was omitted. It was therefore considered to be a "former city", like Brechin and Elgin.

Yet road signs around the borders used the term "The City of Perth", and directional signs within indicated "City Centre". In June 2007, Alex Salmond, then the First Minister of Scotland, backed a campaign to confer city status on Perth, saying it should be granted "at the next commemorative opportunity". The local authority, Perth and Kinross, stated that the 800th anniversary of the city in 2009 should create "a foundation for Perth to bid for formal city status".

Perth was one of the 26 bidders for city status to mark the Queen's Diamond Jubilee in 2012. On 14 March 2012, Perth's city status was successfully reinstated, along with Chelmsford and St Asaph. It became Scotland's seventh city. The Queen visited Perth on 6 July 2012, for what was the culmination of the Scottish leg of her Diamond Jubilee tour. Her previous visit to the city had been to open the Perth Concert Hall, in 2005.

=== Heraldry ===
The coat of arms of Perth shows a paschal lamb holding a saltire, within a royal tressure. The shield is borne on the breast of a double-headed eagle. The motto is pro lege rege et grege (Latin for "for the law, king and people").

The coat of arms dates back to at least the 14th century, and is first recorded, as described, on a seal of 1378. Red and silver are the colours of John the Baptist, the town's patron saint, and the lamb is his symbol. The double-headed eagle, originally a Roman symbol, may refer to a former Roman settlement called "Bertha" near where Perth now stands.

The double-headed eagle was adopted as the supporter of the arms of Perth and Kinross when that council area was created in 1975.

== Demography ==
=== Population ===
In 1891, the population of Perth was 30,768. In 1901, it was 32,872, an increase of 2,104 in ten years. According to the 2022 Census for Scotland, ONS data for Perth and Kinross increased to 151,120.

Perth compared according to UK Census 2001
	Perth	Perth & Kinross	Scotland
Total population	43,450	97,824	5,062,011
Foreign born	3.06%	3.57%	3.35%
Over 75 years old	8.16%	8.56%	7.09%
Unemployed	1,045	2,730	148,082

According to the 2001 United Kingdom census, Perth had a total population of 43,450. A more recent population estimate of the city has been recorded as 44,820 in 2008. The demographic make-up of the population is much in line with the rest of Scotland. The age group from 30 to 44 forms the largest portion of the population (22%). The median age of males and females living in Perth was 37 and 40 years respectively, compared to 37 and 39 years for those in the whole of Scotland.

=== Trends ===
The place of birth of the city's residents was 95.42% United Kingdom (including 87.80% from Scotland), 0.52% Republic of Ireland, 1.18% from other European Union countries, and 1.88% from elsewhere in the world. The economic activity of residents aged 16–74 was 57.10% in full-time employment, 12.90% in part-time employment, 6.08% self-employed, 3.29% unemployed, 2.37% students with jobs, 2.84% students without jobs, 14.75% retired, 4.93% looking after home or family, 5.94% permanently sick or disabled, and 4.07% economically inactive for other reasons. Compared with the average demography of Scotland, Perth has low proportions of people born outside the European Union, but has both higher proportions born within the European Union and those over 75 years old.

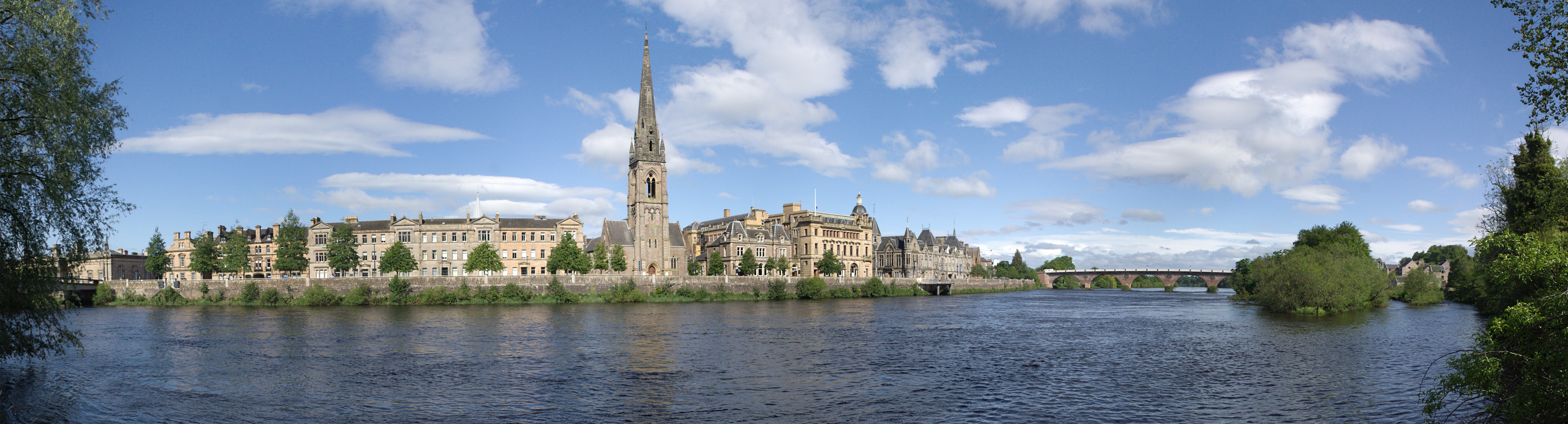
River Tay and Tay Street. The wooded islands on the right are known as The Stanners

=== Religion ===
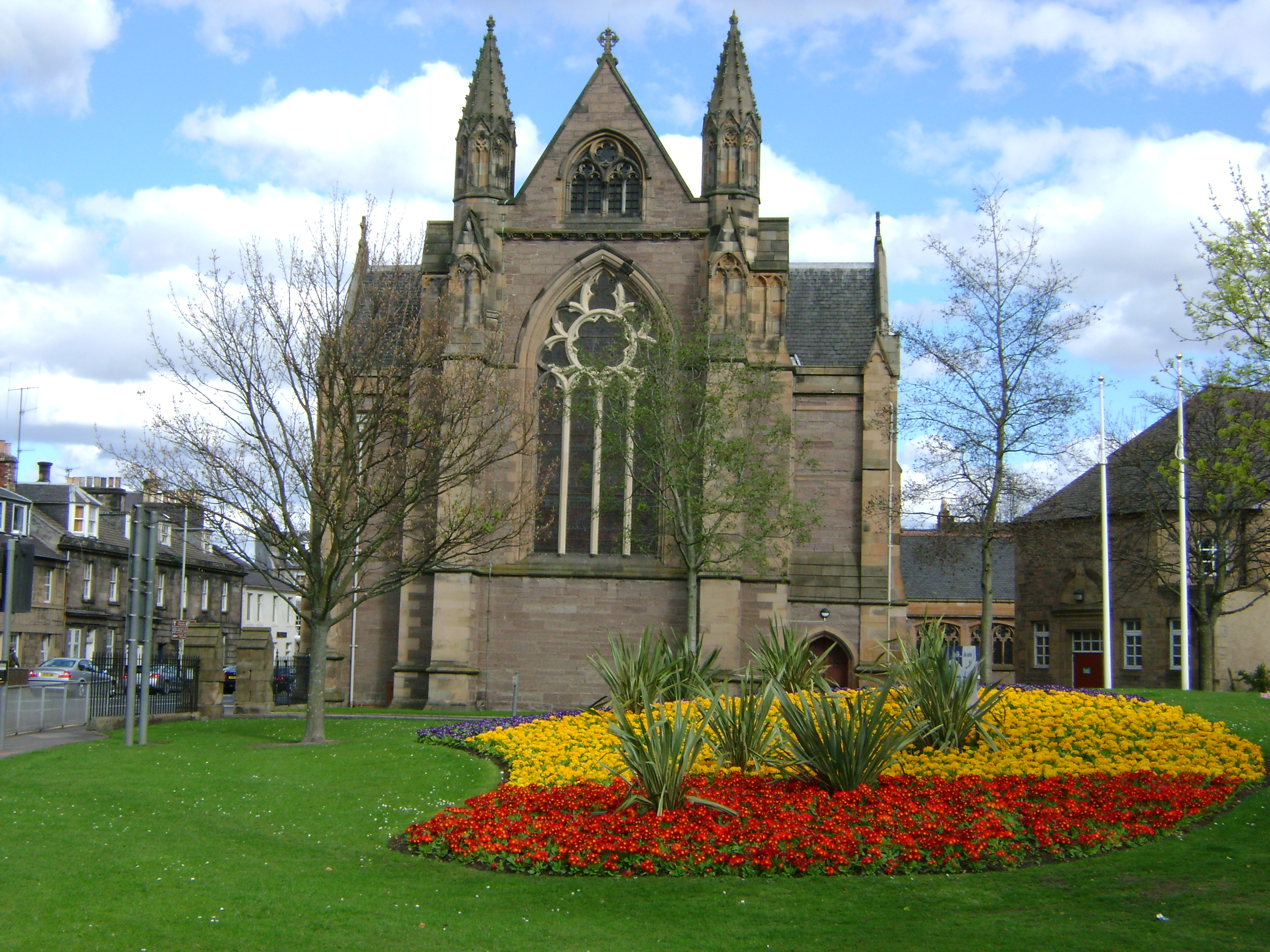
St Ninian's Cathedral

Christianity is the most common religion in the city. In Census 2011, over half of the population of the council area of Perth and Kinross stated that they belonged to one of the Christian denominations. The most popular denomination is the Church of Scotland, which is organised through the Presbytery of Perth. It has nine churches throughout the city. The largest of these is St John's Kirk, in St John's Place. The second most popular Christian denomination is the Roman Catholic Church, which has three churches in the city organised through the Diocese of Dunkeld. There is also St Mary's Monastery, at Kinnoull on the eastern edge of the city, which is home to a Redemptorist congregation. The Scottish Episcopal Church is organised through the Diocese of St Andrews, Dunkeld and Dunblane and has two churches in the city (St Ninian's Cathedral and Church of St. John the Baptist).

There are several other Christian churches in the city; these include the Methodist Church, Free Presbyterian Church of Scotland, the Elim Pentecostal Church, the Salvation Army and several smaller Protestant churches. There is also a Quaker community in the city, as well as a Church of Jesus Christ of Latter-day Saints.

The Perth Islamic community meet at a mosque on Glasgow Road.

The number of adherents to these religions is in decline. In the 2011 census, almost 40% of respondents indicated that they did not adhere to any religion.

Perth's extant places of worship

- St John's Kirk, St John's Place (Church of Scotland)
- St Matthew's Church, Tay Street (Church of Scotland)
- Kinnoull Parish Church, Dundee Road (Church of Scotland)
- St Leonard's-in-the-Fields Church, Marshall Place (Church of Scotland)
- Perth North Church, Mill Street (209 High Street) (Church of Scotland)
- St Ninian's Cathedral, Atholl Street (Episcopal)
- St John the Baptist Roman Catholic Church, Melville Street (Roman Catholic)
- St John the Baptist Episcopal Church, Princes Street (Scottish Episcopal)
- Congregational Church of Perth, Kinnoull Street (Congregational)
- Knox Church, Tulloch Terrace (Free Church of Scotland)
- Perth Free Presbyterian Church, Pomarium Street (Church of Scotland)
- Perth Methodist Church, Scott Street (Methodist)
- Trinity Church of the Nazarene, York Place (Wesleyan)
- St Mary's Monastery, Hatton Road (Roman Catholic)
- Perth Mosque, Glasgow Road (Islam)

Extant former church buildings

- St Leonard's Parish Church, King Street
- Perth Middle Church, Tay Street
- St Andrew's Church, Atholl Street
- St Paul's Church, Old High Street (shell)

== Geography and climate ==
Situated at the southern extremity of a spacious and fertile plain, Perth itself is flat (as are the areas immediately to the north, east and west), but it is nestled between the following hills (includes distance from Perth and summit height):

To the east

- Kinnoull Hill – 1.5 miles (2.4 km), 728 ft (222 m)

To the south-southeast

- Moncreiffe Hill – 2.7 miles (4.3 km), 732 ft (223 m)

To the south-southwest

- Friarton Hill – 1.7 miles (2.7 km), 302 ft (92 m)
- St Magdalene's Hill – 1.55 miles (2.49 km), 430 ft (130 m)
- Hilton Hill – 1.7 miles (2.7 km), 449 ft (137 m)
- Mailer Hill – 1.9 miles (3.1 km), 597 ft (182 m)

As with most of the British Isles, Perth has an oceanic climate (Köppen Cfb) with cool summers and mild winters. The nearest Met Office weather station is at Strathallan, around 5 mi (8 km) from the centre of Perth.Temperatures extremes since 1960 have ranged from −18.6 °C (−1 °F) in January 1963 to 32.0 °C (90 °F) in July 2022. However, a temperature of −21.7 °C (−7 °F) was recorded on 14 November 1919. As well as this, the temperature reached 31.1 °C (88.0 °F) on 28 June 2018. The coldest temperature recorded in recent years is −17.8 °C (0 °F) in December 2010. However, nearby Strathallan reported −18.0 °C (0 °F) in February 2021. In an average year, the warmest day rises to around 27 °C (81 °F), and about four days exceed 25 °C (77 °F).

Climate data for Perth (23 m asl, averages 1991–2020, extremes 1960–present)
Month	Jan	Feb	Mar	Apr	May	Jun	Jul	Aug	Sep	Oct	Nov	Dec	Year
Record high °C (°F)	14.8 (58.6)	15.9 (60.6)	21.4 (70.5)	23.9 (75.0)	28.1 (82.6)	31.1 (88.0)	32.0 (89.6)	30.3 (86.5)	28.6 (83.5)	24.0 (75.2)	17.7 (63.9)	15.4 (59.7)	32.0 (89.6)
Mean daily maximum °C (°F)	7.1 (44.8)	7.7 (45.9)	9.5 (49.1)	12.7 (54.9)	15.8 (60.4)	18.4 (65.1)	20.1 (68.2)	19.3 (66.7)	16.9 (62.4)	13.1 (55.6)	9.4 (48.9)	7.1 (44.8)	13.1 (55.6)
Daily mean °C (°F)	4.0 (39.2)	4.5 (40.1)	5.9 (42.6)	8.4 (47.1)	11.1 (52.0)	13.9 (57.0)	15.7 (60.3)	15.2 (59.4)	12.9 (55.2)	9.2 (48.6)	6.1 (43.0)	3.8 (38.8)	9.2 (48.6)
Mean daily minimum °C (°F)	0.7 (33.3)	1.2 (34.2)	2.3 (36.1)	4.0 (39.2)	6.3 (43.3)	9.4 (48.9)	11.2 (52.2)	11.0 (51.8)	8.8 (47.8)	5.7 (42.3)	2.8 (37.0)	0.5 (32.9)	5.3 (41.5)
Record low °C (°F)	−18.6 (−1.5)	−15.1 (4.8)	−11.9 (10.6)	−5.3 (22.5)	−3.7 (25.3)	−1.1 (30.0)	3.2 (37.8)	2.9 (37.2)	−3.6 (25.5)	−6.5 (20.3)	−10.2 (13.6)	−17.8 (0.0)	−18.6 (−1.5)
Average precipitation mm (inches)	80.4 (3.17)	92.0 (3.62)	52.9 (2.08)	47.9 (1.89)	50.9 (2.00)	67.7 (2.67)	65.3 (2.57)	75.8 (2.98)	59.8 (2.35)	97.2 (3.83)	87.1 (3.43)	88.1 (3.47)	865.0 (34.06)
Average precipitation days (≥ 1.0 mm)	14.1	10.8	11.2	8.5	9.6	9.7	11.1	11.1	10.0	13.9	11.6	12.1	133.5
Mean monthly sunshine hours	43.3	70.3	114.5	164.1	188.3	159.8	172.8	154.6	122.5	83.0	61.7	35.3	1,370
Source 1: Met Office (precipitation days 1981-2010)
Source 2: Starlings Roost Weather

== Economy ==
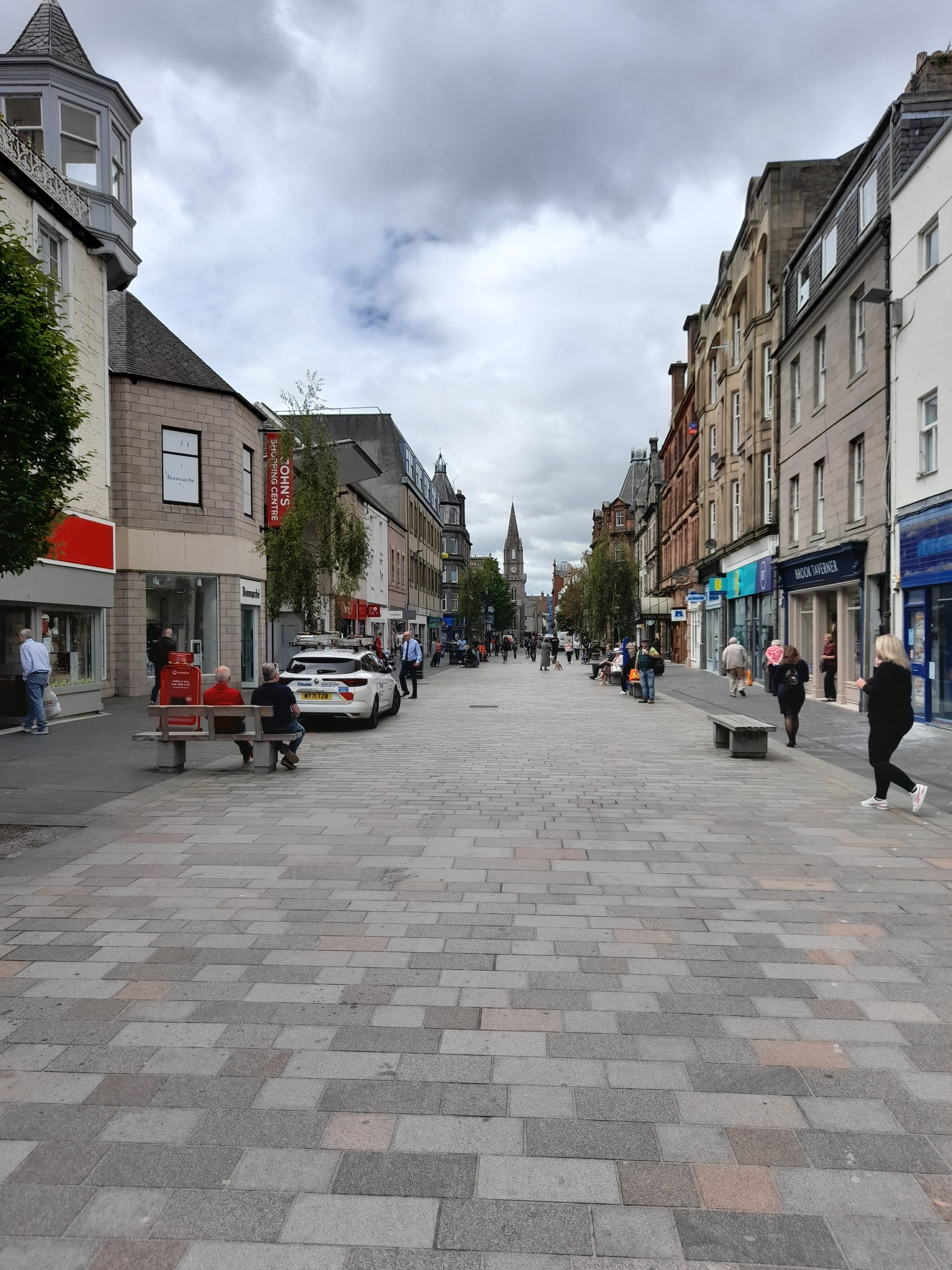
Looking west along Perth's High Street

The strength of Perth's economy lies in its diversity, with a balance of large companies, the public sector, a broad range of small and medium-sized enterprises and many self-employed business people. The development in renewable energy, insurance, manufacturing, leisure, health and transport is stimulating employment. The largest employer in the city is Perth and Kinross Council which employ 6,000 people. Other main employers include NHS Tayside, SSE plc, and Perth College UHI (part of the University of the Highlands and Islands). The leading international transportation company Stagecoach Group also has its global headquarters in the city.

Perth was formerly headquarters of insurance firm General Accident; however, since General Accident merged with Norwich Union to form Aviva, the office has been primarily used as a call centre.

Perth's city centre is situated to the west of the banks of the River Tay. The pedestrianised portion of the High Street, which runs from the junction of St John Street to Scott Street, is the main focus of the shopping area. The centre has a variety of major and independent retailers. The major retailers are largely based on the High Street, St John Street and in the St John's Centre. Independent retailers can be found on George Street, St John Street, Princes Street, Methven Street, the Old High Street and Canal Street. A£3 million pound project for the High Street and King Edward Street provided new seating, lighting and the laying of natural stone in 2010. A retail park, constructed in 1988, exists to the north-west of the city centre on St Catherine's Road, and provides eight purpose-built units.

McEwens department store was in business on St John's Street for almost 150 years. It closed in March 2016.

Before the credit crisis, Perth's economy was growing at 2.6% per year, considerably above the Scottish average of 2.1%. Since the credit crisis, growth has slowed considerably, though still remained above the Scottish average.

The Perth economy is ranked in the Top 10 enterprising demographics in Scotland, with an average of 42.6 registered enterprises per 10,000 residents putting it well above the Scottish average of 30.1.

== Culture ==
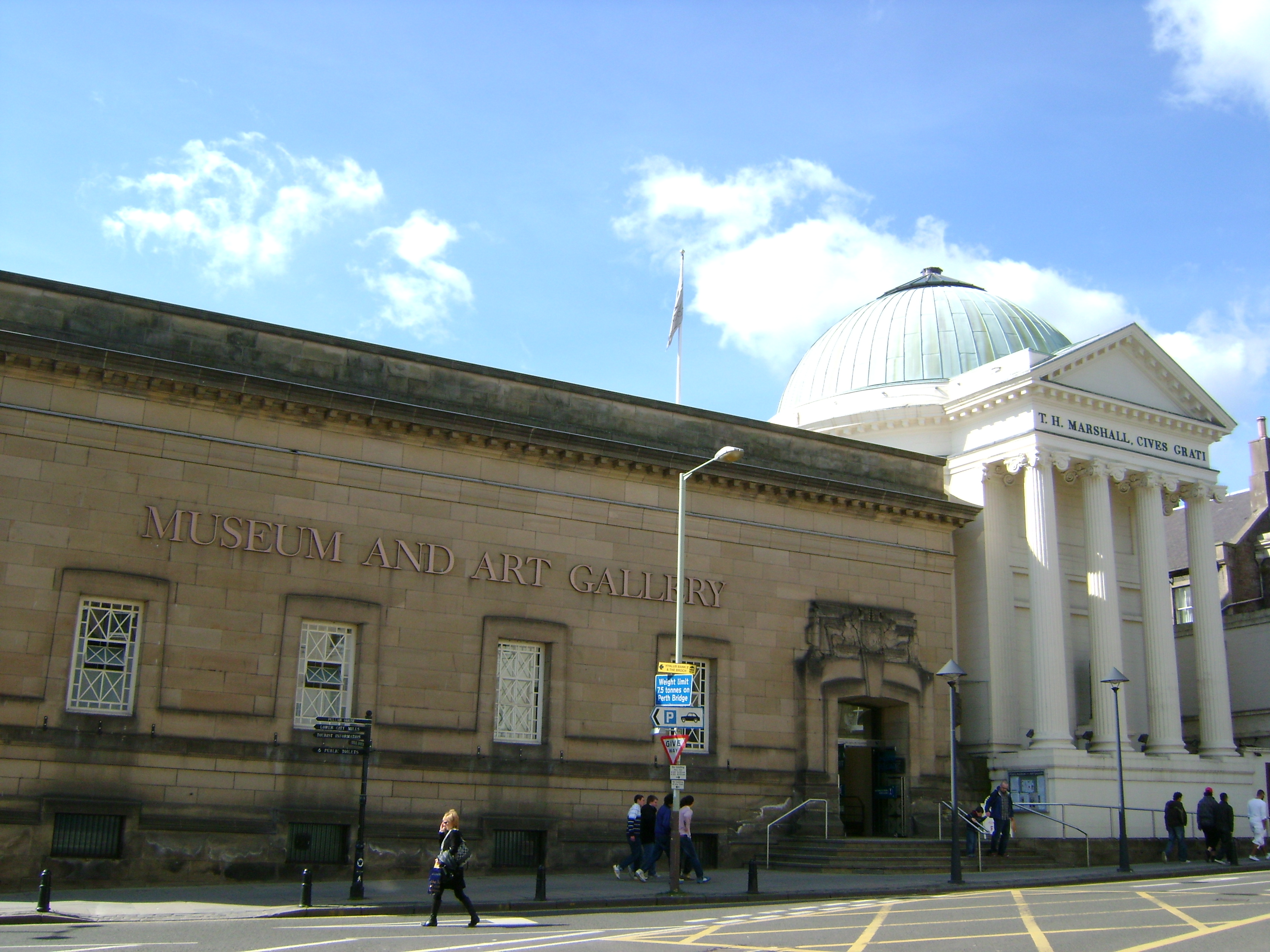
Perth Art Gallery

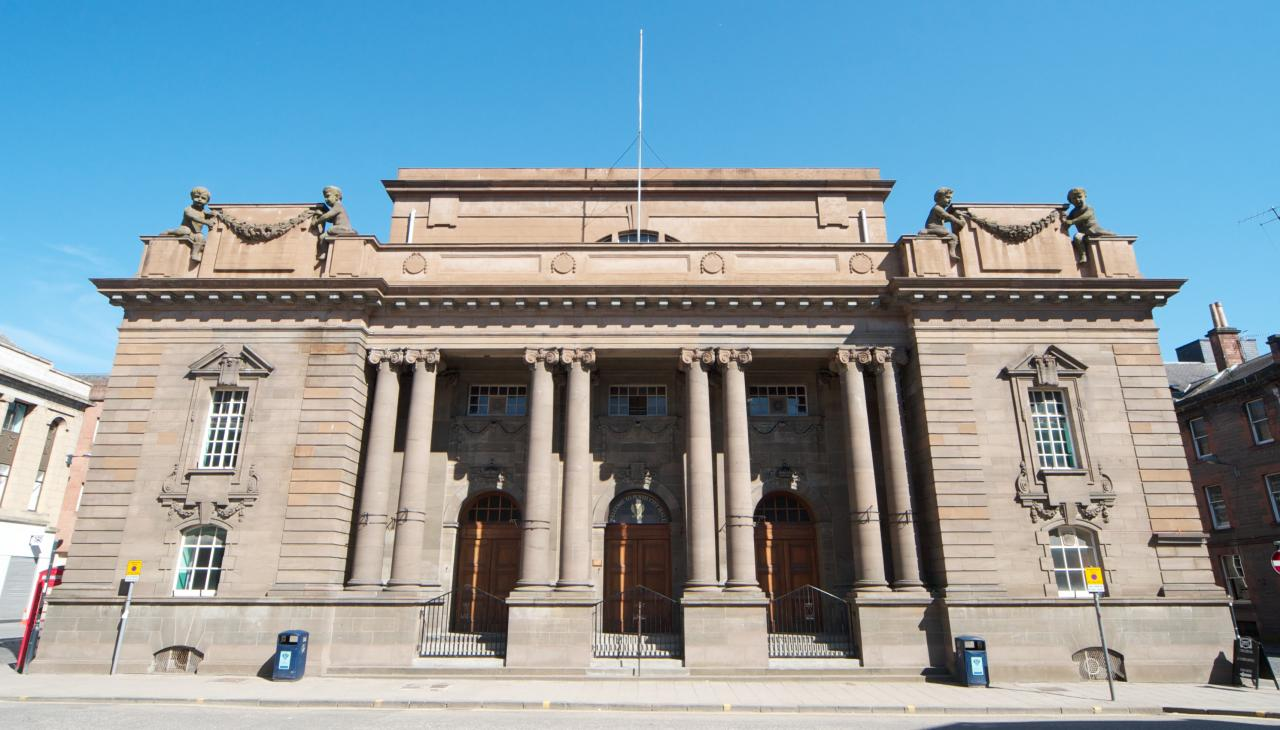
Perth City Hall, containing Perth Museum

Perth Art Gallery, at the eastern end of George Street, is recognised as one of the oldest provincial museums in Scotland. Another museum, known as the Fergusson Gallery, has, since 1992, been located in the Category A listed former Perth Water Works building on Tay Street. This contains the major collection of the works of the artist John Duncan Fergusson.

Perth Theatre opened in 1900. It underwent a £10 million redevelopment to house new studio space, a youth theatre, construction workshop and a series of front of house performance areas and new main entrance from Mill Street in addition to the main focus of the conservation and restoration of the historic Victorian auditorium. Perth Concert Hall, which opened in 2005, was built on the site of the former Horsecross Market.

Perth City Hall has been used as a venue for several high-profile concerts over the years, including Morrissey, as well as Conservative Party conferences. The hall now contains Perth Museum.

The new-wave band Fiction Factory formed in Perth, and had some success with their hit "(Feels Like) Heaven" in 1984. The song, which reached number six in the charts, was their biggest hit.

The Perth Festival of the Arts is an annual collection of art, theatre, opera and classical music events in the city. The annual event lasts for a couple of weeks and is usually held in May. In recent years, the festival has broadened its appeal by adding comedy, rock and popular music acts to the bill.

Perth has hosted the National Mòd in 1896, 1900, 1924, 1929, 1947, 1954, 1963, 1980 and 2004.

=== Landmarks and tourism ===
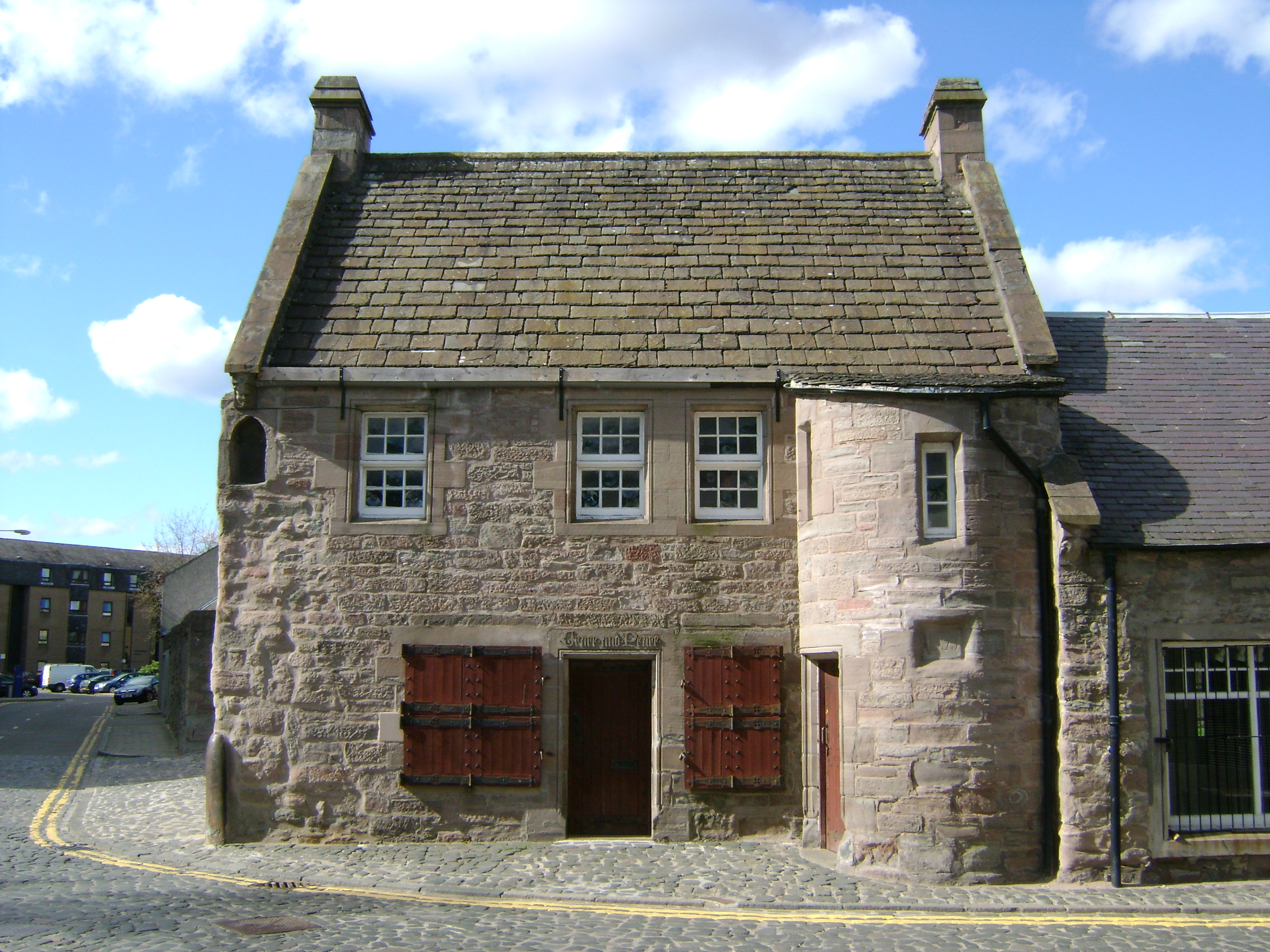
Fair Maid's House

The Category A listed St John's Kirk, on St John's Place, is architecturally and historically one of the most significant buildings in Perth. The settlement of the original church dates back to the mid-12th century. During the middle of the 12th century, the church was allowed to fall into disrepair, when most of the revenues were used by David I to fund Dunfermline Abbey. The majority of the present church was constructed between 1440 and 1500. Though much altered, its tower and lead-clad spire continue to dominate the Perth skyline. The Church has lost its medieval south porch and sacristy, and the north transept was shortened during the course of the 19th century during street-widening. A rare treasure, a unique survival in Scotland, is a 15th-century brass candelabrum or chandelier, imported from the Low Countries. The survival of this object is all the more remarkable as it includes a statuette of the Virgin Mary. It is thought to have been hung in the Skinner's aisle. An inventory of 1544 lists another hanging brass chandelier as an ornament of the altar of Our Lady.

Another Category A listed building is the former King James VI Hospital, built in 1750 on the site of the former Perth Charterhouse, which was burned in 1559 during the Reformation.

The spire of Category B listed St Paul's Church, which was completed in 1807 is a major focus point around St Paul's Square at the junction of Old High Street and North Methven Street. The development of the church led to an expansion of the city to the west. Pullar House on Mill Street was once used by J. Pullar and Sons dyeworks, the largest industry in Perth at one time, and has since been converted into office use for Perth and Kinross Council in 2000.

The Category B listed Fair Maid's House, in North Port, is the oldest surviving secular building in Perth. Built on the foundations of previous buildings, parts of the structure date back from 1475. The building was used as the home of Catherine Glover in the novel The Fair Maid of Perth, which was written by Sir Walter Scott in 1828.

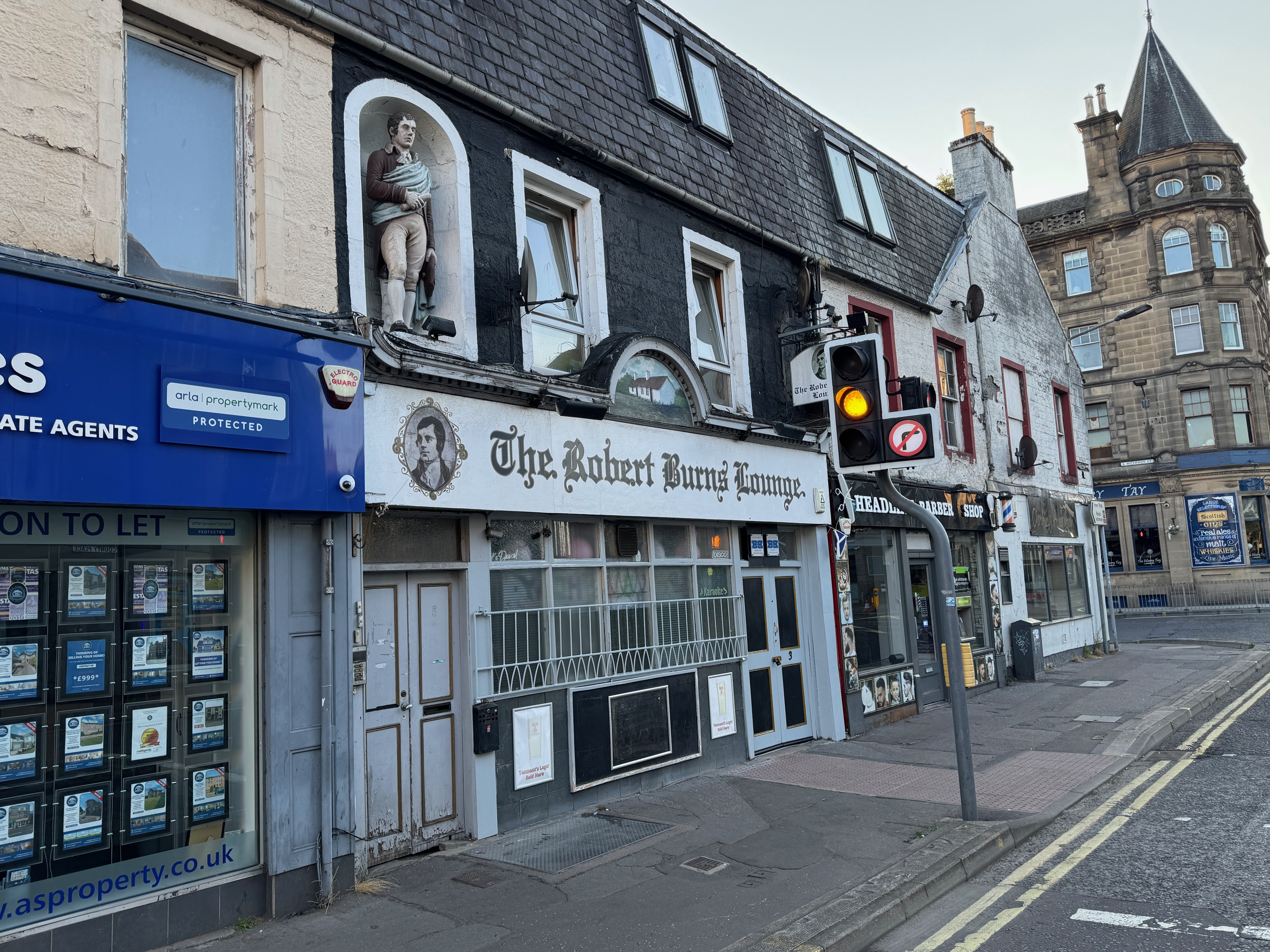
Robert Burns Lounge

Another bard, Robert Burns, is memorialised with a small statue in a niche above the Robert Burns Lounge Bar, at 5 County Place. It is the work of a local sculptor William Anderson, the son of noted painter David Anderson, who was active in the mid-19th century. The statue was installed in 1854 on what was then the sculptor's house. It was later moved to North Methven Street until 1886, then to the 1 Albert Place home of photographer John Henderson, but was returned after Anderson's death.

The nearby City Mills, built to serve Perth Lade from the River Almond, was once the site of industry until the early 19th century. Only the Upper and Lower City Mills survive to this day. The Category A listed Lower City Mills, which date from 1805, were used for barley and oatmeal, while the Category A listed Upper Mills, of 1792, consisted of two wheat mills connected to a granary.

=== Conservation ===
After Perth reclaimed its city status in 2012, Perth and Kinross Heritage Trust began the process of conserving the city's historic buildings and structures via the Perth City Heritage Fund (PCHF), which is funded by the Scottish Government. Its aim is to encourage owners of historic buildings within the bounds of Perth Central and Kinnoull Conservation Areas by assisting their repair and renovation work with grants.

Funds have, thus far, been received in three phases: 2012–2015, 2015–2018, and (the most recent) 2018–2021. Funding for the latter part of 2021 and 2022 is expected.

Phases 1 and 2 provided just over £1 million of grant assistance for almost fifty projects.

=== Media ===
The sole newspaper based in the city is the Perthshire Advertiser, owned by Trinity Mirror. The newspaper's offices are based in Watergate, but the newspaper itself is printed in Blantyre. It outlasted both the Perthshire Courier (established in 1809) and the Perthshire Constitutional and Journal (1832).

Television signals are received from the Angus TV transmitter and the local relay TV transmitter situated south east of the city.

One of Britain's most successful radio stations, Hospital Radio Perth, broadcasts to Perth Royal Infirmary and Murray Royal Hospital. The Hospital Broadcasting Association have awarded Hospital Radio Perth the title of "British Station of the Year" in 1996, 1997, 1999 and 2007.

The city is also served by nation-wide stations, BBC Radio Scotland, Greatest Hits Radio Tayside and Fife and Original 106 (formerly Wave FM).

=== Sport and recreation ===
Dewar's Centre, an ice rink, stands on the site formerly occupied by a bonded warehouse for Dewar's Scotch whisky, pictured here in 1988, shortly before its demolition.

St Johnstone is the city's professional football club. The team play in the Scottish Premiership at their home ground, McDiarmid Park, in the Tulloch area of the city. They won the Scottish Cup for the first time in 2014, after 130 years without a major trophy. There are also two East of Scotland League clubs based in Perth – Jeanfield Swifts and Kinnoull.

The senior rugby team, Perthshire RFC, play their games on the North Inch in Scottish National League Division Three. Between 1995 and 1998, professional side Caledonia Reds played some of their home matches at McDiarmid Park before they merged with Glasgow Warriors.

On the western edge of the North Inch is Bell's Sports Centre. Prior to the building of the Greenwich Dome, it was the largest domed building in Britain.

Perth Leisure Pool, to the west of the railway station on the Glasgow Road, is the city's swimming centre. The modern leisure pool complex was built in the mid-1980s to replace the traditional public swimming baths (established 1887), which used to sit just off the Dunkeld Road.

Adjacent to Perth Leisure Pool is the Dewar's Centre, which includes an eight-lane ice rink. It has long been a main centre of curling in Scotland, and many top teams compete in this arena and many major events are held here each year. Curling is available from September to April annually. The city also houses the offices of World Curling. There is an indoor bowling hall, hosting major competitions. Historically, Perth had a successful ice hockey team, Perth Panthers, who played at the old ice rink on Dunkeld Road. The rink at Dewars is the wrong shape for ice hockey, so when the team reformed in 2000 for two seasons, they played their home games at Dundee Ice Arena. The Dewar's distillery that stood on the site until 1988 was one of the country's "big three" blenders. Its location was chosen due to its proximity to the General Railway Station, whose tracks behind the western side of the building. The distillery was one of the city's largest employers.

In 2024, plans were announced to close Perth Leisure Pool, Bell's Sports Centre and Dewar's Centre and replace them with a single new sports centre. This new facility would not include an ice rink.

Perth hosts Scotland's largest volleyball event every May – the Scottish Open Volleyball Tournament. There is a highly competitive indoor competition held inside Bell's Sports Centre alongside both a competitive and fun outdoor event played on the North Inch. Teams competing traditionally camp alongside the outdoor courts with the campsite being administered by local cadets. The Scottish Volleyball Association's annual general meeting is also held at the same time as the tournament.

=== Parks and gardens ===
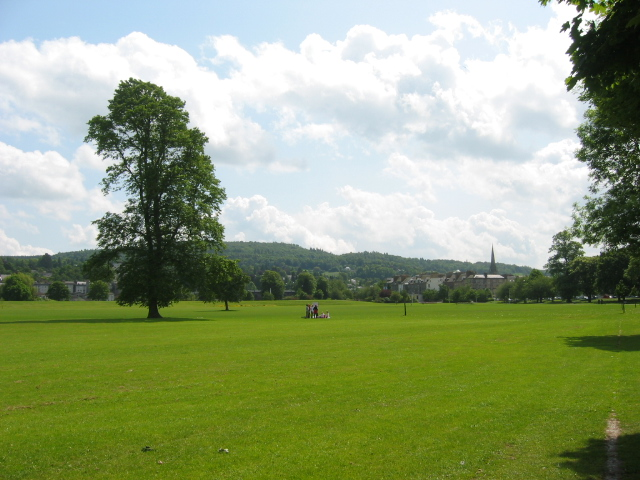
The North Inch, looking southeast towards the city centre

Perth is also home to two main parks, namely the North Inch and South Inch (the word "Inch" being an anglicisation of the Gaelic innis meaning island or meadow). The Inches were given to the city in 1377 by King Robert III.

The North Inch is directly north of the city centre, bordered to the south by Charlotte Street and Atholl Street and to the southwest by Rose Terrace, named for Rose Anderson, the wife of Thomas Hay Marshall, whose house was on the Atholl Street corner. A recreational path circumnavigates the entire park.

The River Tay bounds it to the east. A little farther to the north is the Inch's eponymous golf course.

Situated 0.5 mi (800 m) south of the North Inch, directly across the city centre, is the South Inch. The Inches are linked by Tay Street, which runs along the western banks of the Tay. The South Inch is bordered to the north by Marshall Place and Kings Place; to the east by Shore Road; to the south by South Inch View and South Inch Terrace; and to the west by the rear of the houses on St Leonards Bank. The Edinburgh Road passes through its eastern third. The South Inch offers various activities, including bowling, an adventure playground, a skate park, and, in the summer, a bouncy castle. The Perth Show takes place annually on the section of the Inch between the Edinburgh Road and Shore Road.

Another park in the city, Norie-Miller Walk, is located across the Tay.

=== Gardens ===
- Branklyn Garden
- Cherrybank Gardens (closed)
- Rodney Gardens

=== Twin towns ===
Perth has a number of twin cities around the world. As of 2026, these are:

- Aschaffenburg, Bavaria, Germany
- Bydgoszcz, Kuyavian–Pomeranian Voivodeship, Poland
- Cognac, Charente, France
- Haikou, Hainan, China
- Nikopol, Dnipropetrovsk, Ukraine
- Perth, Western Australia, Australia
- Perth, Ontario, Canada

In 2022, Perth and Kinross Council voted to end the twinning arrangement with Pskov in Russia following the 2022 Russian invasion of Ukraine, a process also seen in other cities around the UK.

== Education ==
There are many primary schools in Perth, while secondary education includes Perth Academy, Perth Grammar School, Perth High School, St John's Academy and Bertha Park High School.

Further and higher education, including a range of degrees, is available through Perth College UHI, one of the largest partners in the University of the Highlands and Islands. It ran a network of learning centres across the area, in Blairgowrie, Crieff, Kinross and Pathways in Perth, although these closed in 2019. In 2000, an interdisciplinary Centre for Mountain Studies was established at the college. It also owns AST (Air Service Training) which delivers a range of aircraft engineering courses.

== Transport ==
=== Road ===
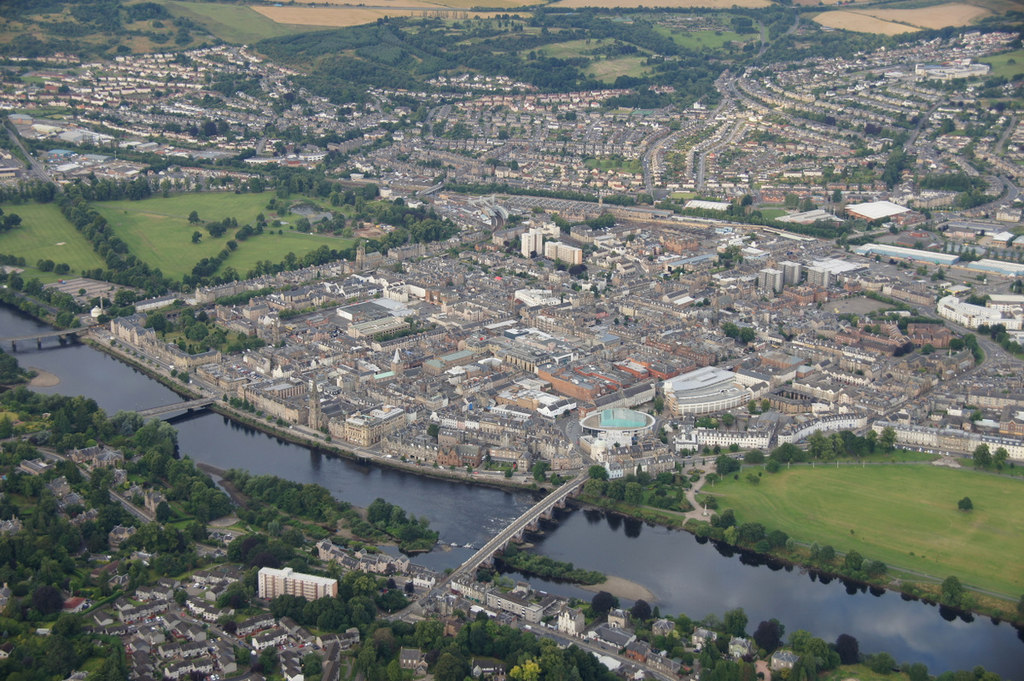
Three of the four bridges that cross the Tay at Perth. Right to left: Perth Bridge, Queen's Bridge and the Tay Viaduct.

Perth remains a key transport hub for journeys by road and rail throughout Scotland. The M90 motorway, the northernmost motorway in Great Britain, runs south from the city to Edinburgh; the A9 road connects it to Stirling and Glasgow in the south west and Inverness in the north. Other major roads serving the city include the A85 to Crieff and Crianlarich (and ultimately Oban), the A93 to Blairgowrie and Braemar, the A94 to Coupar Angus and Forfar and the A90 to Dundee and Aberdeen.

The city itself was bypassed to the south and east by the M90 in the 1970s and to the west by the A9 in 1986. The M90, A9 and A93 all meet at Broxden Junction, one of the busiest and most important road junctions in Scotland. Uniquely, all seven of Scotland's cities are signposted from here: Glasgow and Stirling via the A9 southbound, Dundee and Aberdeen via the A90, Edinburgh via the M90, Inverness via the A9 northbound, and Perth itself via the A93 through the city centre. The final part of the M90 included the construction of the Friarton Bridge in 1978 to facilitate travel to Dundee and Aberdeen to the east of the city, finally removing inter-city traffic from the centre. The bridge is the most northerly piece of the motorway network in the United Kingdom.

There are four bridges that cross the River Tay in Perth. The northernmost structure is Smeaton's Bridge (also known as Perth Bridge and, locally, the Old Bridge), completed in 1771 and widened in 1869, which carries the automotive and pedestrian traffic of West Bridge Street (the A85). A former tollbooth building, on the southern side of the bridge at the Bridgend end of the bridge, is a category C listed building dating from around 1800. It was J. S. Lees Fish & Poultry Shop later in its life.

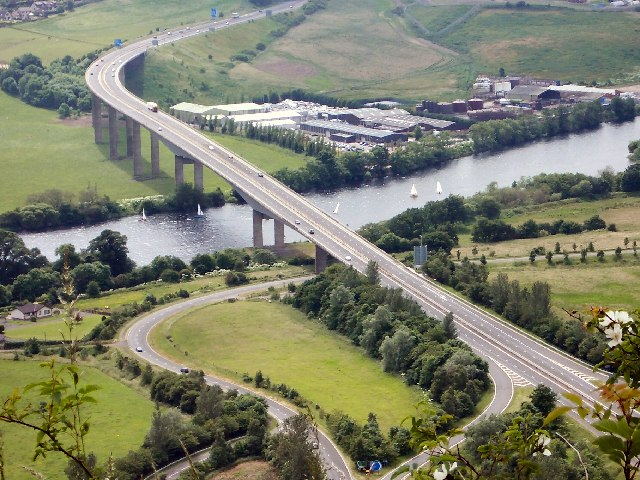
Friarton Bridge, on the southern outskirts of Perth

Next, some 500 yd (460 m) downstream, is Queen's Bridge, which also carries vehicular and pedestrian traffic, this time of South Street and Tay Street. Queen's Bridge was completed in 1960, replacing the old Victoria Bridge (1902–1960), and was opened by Queen Elizabeth II in October of that year. The third bridge in the centre of Perth is the Tay Viaduct, a single-track railway bridge carrying trains to and from the railway station, 0.5 mi (800 m) to the north-west. It was completed in 1863. A pedestrian walkway lies on its northern side. Finally, the southernmost crossing of the Tay inside Perth's boundary is the aforementioned Friarton Bridge.

The construction of a fifth bridge farther upstream (north) from the existing bridges was being considered in 2012.

=== Rail ===
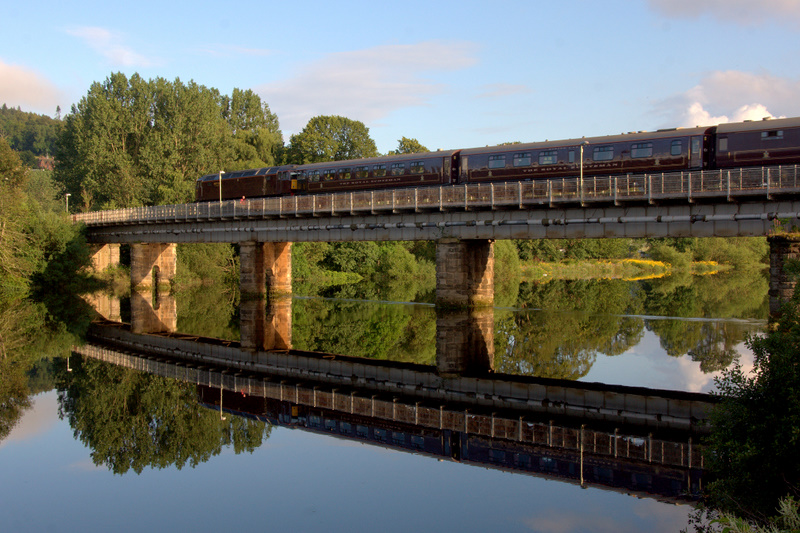
The Royal Scotsman crossing the bridge at Perth

Perth railway station has regular services to Fife and Edinburgh Waverley via the Forth Bridge, east to Dundee and Aberdeen, south to Stirling and Glasgow Queen Street, and north to Inverness; however, as a result of the Beeching Axe, the main line to Aberdeen through Strathmore via Coupar Angus and Forfar was closed to passenger traffic in 1967; Aberdeen services have since taken the less direct route via Dundee. Similarly, the direct main line to Edinburgh via Glenfarg, Dunfermline and the Forth Bridge was abandoned in 1970 in favour of the longer, more circuitous route via Stirling. This closure was not recommended by Beeching, but allowed the M90 motorway to be built on top of the former the railway alignment in the Glenfarg area. In 1975, most Edinburgh trains were re-routed via Ladybank and the Forth Bridge, with some improvement in journey time.

There are two direct trains per day to London: the Highland Chieftain, operated by London North Eastern Railway to King's Cross (from Inverness), and the Caledonian Sleeper, which runs overnight to Euston.

A railway station also existed on Princes Street, which was built in the late 18th century to connect the Edinburgh Road to the new bridge. Perth Princes Street railway station opened on 24 May 1847 on the Dundee and Perth Railway. It closed to regular passenger traffic on 28 February 1966. The line passes behind Marshall Place and is carried over cross streets by several bridges.

Muirton railway station's existence, on the Scottish Midland Junction Railway, was relatively brief, from 1936 to 1959.

=== Bus ===
Local buses are run by Stagecoach South Scotland. Inter-city bus travel is made from Perth bus station and connects to most major destinations in Scotland. There is a park & ride service from the services at Broxden to the city centre.

=== Air ===
Perth has a small airport. Although it is named Perth Airport, it is located at New Scone, 3.7 mi (6.0 km) north-east of the city. There are no commercial flights out of this airport, but it is used by private aircraft and for pilot training. The nearest major commercial airports are Edinburgh Airport, Glasgow Airport and Aberdeen Airport. Dundee Airport, which lies around 20 miles (32 km) away, is also an option, the latter is served by Loganair.

== Notable people ==
1200s

- William of Perth (12th century), Scottish saint who was martyred in England, was born and lived in Perth

1500s

- John Row (c. 1526–1580), Papal nuncio turned reformer. One of the "six Johns" of the early Scottish reformation

1600s

- William Wilson (1690–1741), minister, one of the founders of the Secession Church

1700s

- Sir George Murray (1772–1846), MP for Perthshire 1824–1832 and 1834–1835, Secretary of State for War and the Colonies 1828–1830 and Master-General of the Ordnance 1834–1835 and 1841–1846. Murray House, Hong Kong and the Murray River, Australia were named after him and the city of Perth, Western Australia, after his birthplace
- Robert Crown, (1753–1841) navy officer, later Admiral of the Imperial Russian navy

1800s

- David Octavius Hill, (1802–1870) FRSA, painter and photographic pioneer
- Dr James Duncan (1810–1866) surgeon, manufacturing chemist, Director of Duncan Flockhart & Co
- Archibald Sandeman (1823–1893), scholar
- James Craig, (1824–1861) recipient of the Victoria Cross
- Effie Gray, (1828–1897) artists' model, wife of Pre-Raphaelite painter John Everett Millais
- Aylmer Cameron, (1833–1909) recipient of the Victoria Cross
- William Vousden (1848–1902), recipient of the Victoria Cross
- Sir Francis Norie-Miller (1859–1947), Insurance Director and Politician
- Alexander Souter (1873–1949), biblical scholar
- John Buchan (1875–1940), Governor General of Canada, The Thirty-Nine Steps
- William Soutar (1898–1943), poet and diarist, who wrote in both English and Braid Scots
- Francis Buchanan White (1842–1894), entomologist and botanist

1900s

- Janet Smith (1902–1924), murder victim
- W. H. Findlay, photographer; took over 25,000 images of Perth over fifty years
- Neil Cameron, Baron Cameron of Balhousie (1920–1985), Marshal of the Royal Air Force
- Desmond Carrington (1926–2017), BBC Radio 2 DJ
- Sir George Mathewson (b. 1940), educated at Perth Academy
- Richard Simpson (b. 1942) was educated at Perth Academy
- Ann Gloag (b. 1942) and Brian Souter (b. 1954), co-founders Stagecoach Group
- Fred MacAulay (b. 1956), comedian
- John Morgan (1959–2000), etiquette expert and contributor to Debrett's and The Times newspaper
- Gillian McKeith (b. 1959), nutritionist and television personality
- Andrew Fairlie, (1963–2019), Scottish Chef known for Restaurant Andrew Fairlie
- Sylvia Patterson (b. 1965), music journalist and author
- Ewan McGregor (b. 1971), actor
- Christopher Bowes, musician and founding member of folk metal band Alestorm and power metal band Gloryhammer
- Corrie McKeague, Royal Air Force Regiment gunner who disappeared from Bury St Edmunds town centre on a night out in September 2016

Sport

- Joseph Anderson, cricketer
- Frank Christie, Liverpool football player and East Fife football player and manager
- Bobby Moncur, Scotland and Newcastle United captain
- David Wotherspoon, football player for St Johnstone
- Elena Baltacha, tennis player
- Sergei Baltacha Jr., football player, brother of Elena Baltacha, attended Perth High School
- Matt Fagerson, professional rugby union player, number 8
- Zander Fagerson, professional rugby union player, prop, brother of the above
- Alan Fraser, cricketer, brother of the below
- William Lovat Fraser, cricketer and rugby union player, brother of the above
- Peter Gardiner, cricketer and footballer
- Chloe Grant, racing driver
- Stevie May, professional football player
- Scott Donaldson, professional snooker player
- Eilidh Doyle, Olympic athlete
- Lisa Evans, professional football player
- Mike Kerrigan, first-class cricketer
- Eve Muirhead, curler, Olympic gold medallist
- Mili Smith, curler, Olympic gold medallist

== Freedom of the City ==
The following people, military units, organisations, and groups have received the Freedom of the City of Perth.

Individuals

- John Buchan: 29 September 1933
- Sir Francis Norie-Miller: 29 September 1933
- Duke of York: 10 August 1935
- Duchess of York: 10 August 1935
- Sir William Mackenzie: 18 March 1938
- Arthur Kinmond Bell: 18 March 1938
- FM Lord Wavell: 19 July 1947
- Sir Winston Churchill: 19 July 1947
- Sir Anthony Eden: 12 May 1956
- Sir Stanley Norie-Miller: 14 September 1961
- MRAF Sir Neil Cameron: 26 August 1978
- David Kinnear Thomson: 30 October 1982
- Duke of Edinburgh: 6 July 2012
- Brig Sir Melville Jameson: 18 June 2019
- Eve Muirhead: 6 August 2023
- Vicky Wright: 6 August 2023
- Jen Dodds: 6 August 2023
- Hailey Duff: 6 August 2023
- Mili Smith: 6 August 2023
- Lucinda Russell: 6 August 2023
- Peter Scudamore: 6 August 2023

Military units

- The Black Watch (Royal Highland Regiment): 19 July 1947
- The Royal British Legion (Scotland): 8 May 2004
- 51st Highland Volunteers The Royal Regiment of Scotland: 8 May 2010 6 August 2023

Organisations and groups

- St Johnstone Football Club: 23 June 2021
- GB Olympic Gold Medal Curling Team, Winter Olympics 2022
