= The Fair Maid of Perth =

1828 novel by Sir Walter Scott

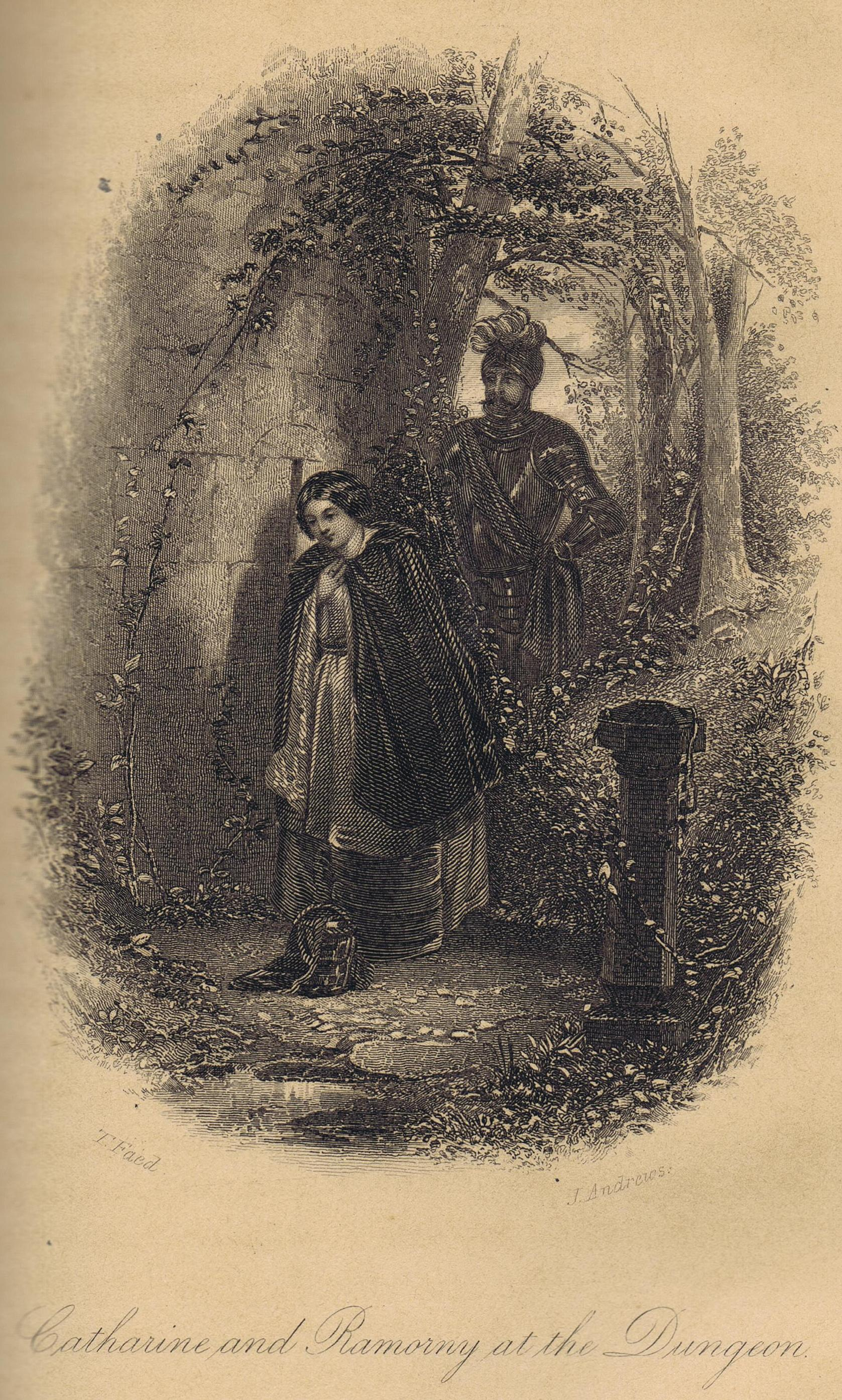
- Catharine and Ramorny at the Dungeon 1859 by T Faed & J Andrews
- Author: Sir Walter Scott
- Language: English
- Series: Chronicles of the Canongate; Waverley Novels
- Genre: Historical novel
- Publisher: Cadell and Co. (Edinburgh); Simpkin and Marshall (London)
- Publication date: 1828
- Publication place: Scotland
- Media type: Print
- Pages: 387 (Edinburgh Edition, 1999)
- Preceded by: Chronicles of the Canongate [first series]
- Followed by: Anne of Geierstein

The Fair Maid of Perth (or St. Valentine's Day) is an 1828 novel by Sir Walter Scott, one of the Waverley novels. Inspired by the strange, but historically true, story of the Battle of the North Inch, it is set in Perth (known at the time as Saint John's Toun, i.e. John's Town) and other parts of Scotland around 1400.

== Composition and sources ==
By the time he finished the first series of Chronicles of the Canongate on 16 September 1827 Scott had been discussing his next work of fiction for several weeks. He was originally minded to embark on a successor to Quentin Durward, which was eventually to become Anne of Geierstein (1829), but in the event he settled on a second series of the Chronicles. Like the first, this was envisaged as a collection of short stories, and it seems likely that by mid-November Scott had written a long Croftangry introduction to match the opening chapters of the first series. On 3 December he completed 'My Aunt Margaret's Mirror', and on the 5th he had decided that the next story would concern Harry Wynd; but before the middle of the month, in response to doubts by James Ballantyne and Robert Cadell about the commercial viability of another publication consisting of a long introduction and a set of short stories, he decided to abbreviate the introduction to a single chapter and allow the Wynd tale, now with the title Saint Valentine's Eve, to fill the rest of the three volumes. There was a break in composition over Christmas, but composition resumed in January and the first volume was completed on 5 February 1828, the second on 2 March and the third on the 29th of that month.

Scott's sources for The Fair Maid of Perth are largely cited in the text of the novel or in the 'Magnum' notes. From the 14th and 15th centuries he drew on the two narrative poems, The Brus by John Barbour, and The Wallace by Blind Hary. From the same period he found helpful material in: Chronica gentis scotorum by John of Fordun, and its continuation Scotichronicon by Walter Bower; Orygynale Cronykil of Scotland by Andrew of Wyntoun; and Scotorum historiae by Hector Boece, translated by John Bellenden. From the seventeenth and eighteenth centuries he used The History of the Houses of Douglas and Angus by David Hume of Godscroft (1644; reissued 1648), and (for many details about Perth) The Muses Threnodie by Henry Adamson edited with extensive notes by James Cant (1774), as well as The History of Scotland from the Accession of the House of Stuart to that of Mary by John Pinkerton (1797). This last was a particularly important source for the historical characters and the main events.

== Editions ==
St Valentine's Day; or, The Fair Maid of Perth was published on 15 May 1828, by Cadell and Co. in Edinburgh and Simpkin and Marshall in London, the latter receiving 6000 copies in all. The price was one and a half guineas (£1 11s 6d or £1.57½). In the summer of 1831 Scott revisited the work for the 'Magnum' edition, making some textual changes and providing a few brief notes, but he was in poor health and many more changes and notes were introduced by J. G. Lockhart (with or without authorial input). Lockhart also provided the novel with an antiquarian and source-documenting introduction to replace Scott's original discussion of work's genesis. The work appeared posthumously in November and December 1832 as Volumes 42 and 43.

The standard modern edition of The Fair Maid of Perth, by A. D. Hook and Donald Mackenzie, was published as Volume 21 of the Edinburgh Edition of the Waverley Novels in 1999: this is based on the first edition with emendations mainly from the manuscript; the 'Magnum' material appears in Volume 25b (2012).

== Plot introduction ==
The fair maid of the title is Catharine Glover, daughter of a glovemaker in Perth, who kisses Henry Gow/Smith, the armourer, while he is sleeping, on Valentine's Day. But Catharine has caught the eye of the Duke of Rothesay, and when Gow interrupts an attempted abduction, the armourer is drawn simultaneously into royal intrigue and highland feud.

== Plot summary ==
The armourer Henry Gow had excited the jealousy of the apprentice Conachar by spending the evening with the glover and his daughter and was returning to their house at dawn, that he might be the first person she saw on St Valentine's morning, when he encountered a party of courtiers in the act of placing a ladder against her window. Having cut off the hand of one, and seized another, who, however, managed to escape, he left the neighbours to pursue the rest, and was saluted by Catharine as her lover. The citizens waited on the provost, who, having heard their grievance, issued a challenge of defiance to the offenders.

Meanwhile, the King who occupied apartments in the convent, having confessed to the prior, was consulting with his brother, when the Earl of March arrived to intimate his withdrawal to the English Border, followed into the courtyard by Louise, and afterwards by the Duke of Rothesay, whose dalliance with the maiden was interrupted by the Earl of Douglas ordering his followers to seize and scourge her. Henry Gow, however, was at hand, and the prince, having committed her to his protection, attended his father's council, at which it was determined that the hostile Clans Chattan and Quhele ("Kay") should be invited to settle their feud by a combat between an equal number of their bravest men in the royal presence, and a commission was issued for the suppression of heresy. The old monarch, having learnt that his son was one of those who had attempted to force their way into the glover's house, insisted that he should dismiss his Master of the Horse, who encouraged all his follies; and while Catharine, who had listened to the Lollard teaching of Father Clement, was being urged by him to favour the secret suit of the Prince, her other lover, Conachar, who had rejoined his clan, appeared to carry off her councillor from arrest as an apostate reformer.

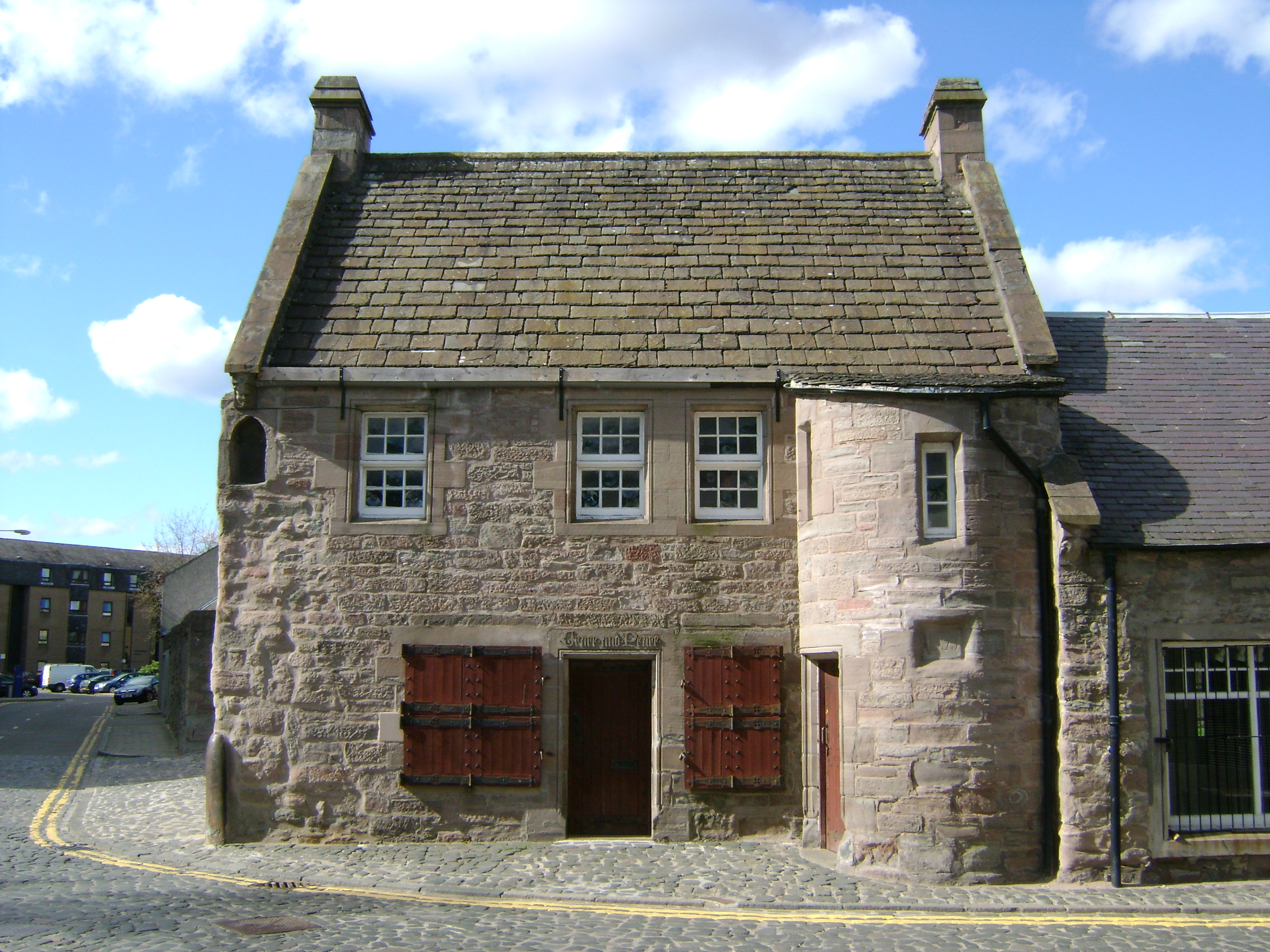
The Fair Maid's House in Perth

The armourer had maimed the Prince's Master of the Horse, Sir John Ramorny, whose desire for revenge was encouraged by the apothecary, Dwining. An assassin named Bonthron undertook to waylay and murder Henry Gow. On Shrovetide evening old Simon was visited by a party of morrice-dancers, headed by Proudfute, who lingered behind to confirm a rumour that Henry Gow had been seen escorting a merry maiden to his house, and then proceeded thither to apologise for having divulged the secret. On his way home in the armourer's coat and cap, as a protection against other revellers, he received a blow from behind and fell dead on the spot. About the same time Sir John was roused from the effects of a narcotic by the arrival of the Prince, who made light of his sufferings, and whom he horrified by suggesting that he should cause the death of his uncle, and seize his father's throne.

The fate of Proudfute, whose body was at first mistaken for that of the armourer, excited general commotion in the city; while Catharine, on hearing the news, rushed to her lover's house and was folded in his arms. Her father then accompanied him to the town council, where he was chosen as the widow's champion, and the Provost repaired to the King's presence to demand a full inquiry. At a council held the following day, trial by ordeal of bier-right, or by combat, was ordered; and suspicion having fallen on Ramorny's household, each of his servants was required to pass before the corpse, in the belief that the wounds would bleed afresh as the culprit approached. Bonthron, however, chose the alternative of combat, and, having been struck down by Gow, was led away to be hanged. But Dwining had arranged that he should merely be suspended so that he could breathe and during the night he and Sir John's page Eviot cut him down and carried him off.

Catharine had learnt that she and her father were both suspected by the commission; and the Provost having offered to place her under the care of The Douglas's daughter, the deserted wife of the Prince, the old glover sought the protection of his former apprentice, who was now the chieftain of his clan. Having returned from his father's funeral, Conachar pleaded for the hand of Catharine, without which he felt he should disgrace himself in the approaching combat with the Clan Chattan. Simon, however, reminded him that she was betrothed to the armourer, and his foster father promised to screen him in the conflict. At the instigation of his uncle, the Prince had been committed to the custody of the Earl of Errol; but, with the Duke's connivance, he was enticed by Ramorny and the apothecary to escape to the castle of Falkland, and, with the help of Bonthron, was starved to death there. Catharine and Louise, however, discovered his fate, and communicated with The Douglas, who overpowered the garrison, and hanged the murderers.

The meeting of the hostile champions had been arranged with great pomp, with barriers erected on three sides of the Inch, in an attempt to keep spectators off the battlefield, and the Tay forming the natural fourth side to the north. The Gilded Arbour summerhouse of the Dominican Friary, which afforded those inside an excellent view of the Inch, was adapted into a grandstand for the King and his entourage. Henry Gow, having consented to supply Eachin (Conachar) with a suit of armour, volunteered to take the place of one of the Clan Chattan who failed to appear. A terrible conflict ensued, during which Torquil and his eight sons all fell defending their chief, who at last fled from the battle-ground unwounded and dishonoured. On hearing of Rothesay's death, Robert III resigned his sceptre to his wily and ambitious brother, and later died broken-hearted when his younger son James was captured by the English king. Albany transferred the regency to his son; but, nineteen years afterwards, the rightful heir returned, and the usurper expiated his own and his father's guilt on the scaffold. The warrants against Simon and his daughter, and Father Clement, were cancelled by the intervention of the Earl of Douglas, and the Church was conciliated with Dwining's ill-gotten wealth. Conachar either became a hermit, or, legend has it, was spirited away by the fairies. Scotland boasts of many distinguished descendants from Henry Gow and his spouse the Fair Maid of Perth.

== Characters ==
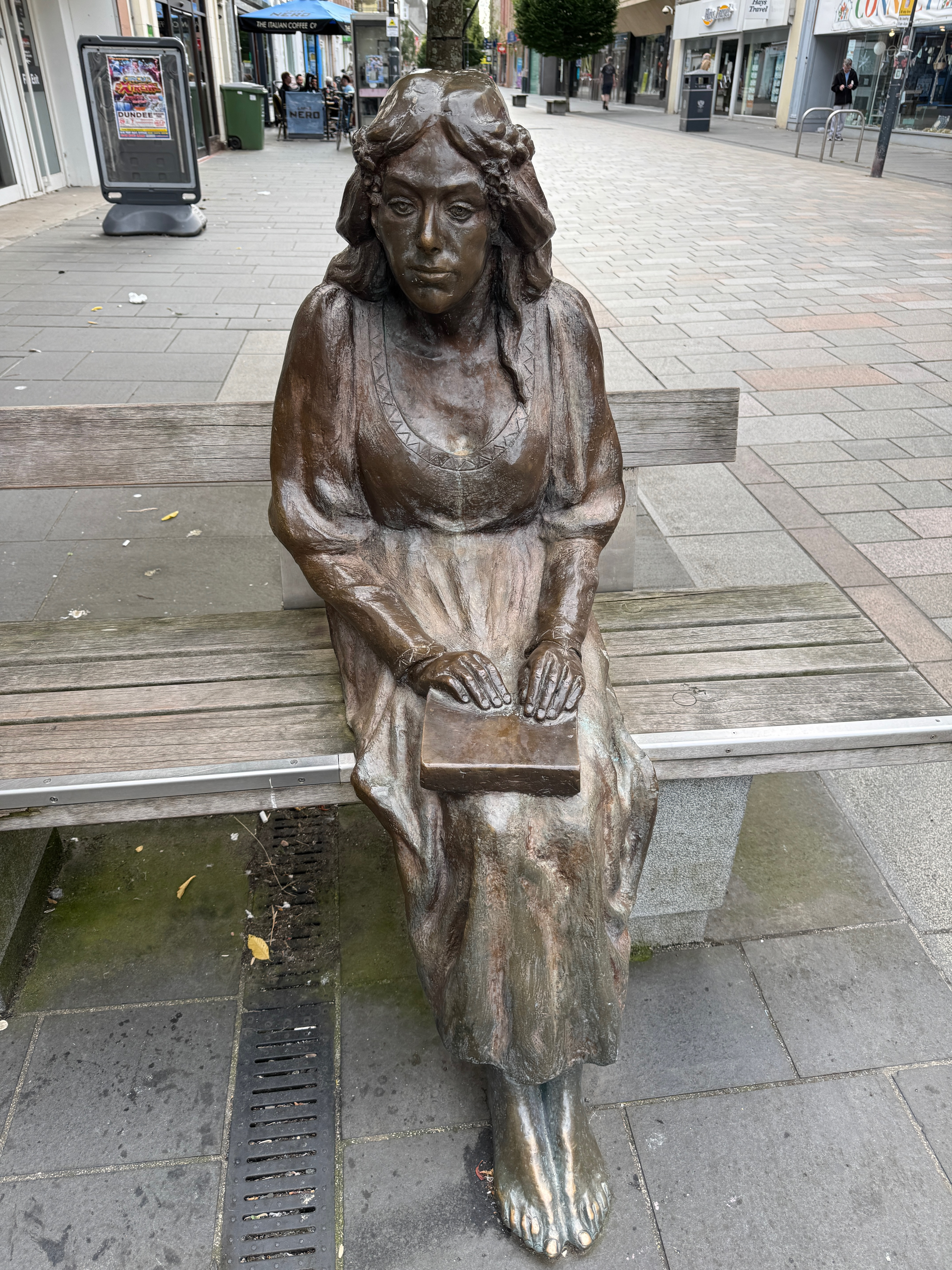
The Fair Maid of Perth, a bronze statue by Graham Ibbeson, sits near the east end of Perth's High Street

Principal characters in bold

- **Simon Glover**, a glove-maker
- **Catherine Glover**, his daughter ('Catharine' is the original compositors' spelling; Scott's consistent manuscript 'Catherine' is restored by the Edinburgh Edition of the Waverley Novels)
- **Conachar**, his apprentice, afterwards Eachin M'Ian, Chief of the Clan Quhele
- Niel Booshalloch, his herdsman
- **Henry Gow, or Smith**, an armourer and burgess
- Luckie Shoolbred, his housekeeper
- Father Francis, a Dominican friar
- Father Clement, a Carthusian monk
- **Oliver Proudfute**, a bonnet-maker
- Bailie Craigdallie
- **Henbane Dwining**, an apothecary
- Sir Patrick Charteris, of Kinfauns, Provost of Perth
- Kit Henshaw, his servant
- Prior Anselm, of St Dominic's Convent
- **King Robert III of Scotland**
- **David, Duke of Rothsay**, his son
- The Duke of Albany, the king's brother
- The Earl of March
- Louise, a minstrel from Provence
- Archibald Douglas, 3rd Earl of Douglas
- The Devil's Dick, one of his followers
- **Sir John Ramorny**, the duke's master of the horse
- Eviot, his page
- Anthony Bonthron, an assassin
- Sir Louis Lunden, town-clerk of Perth
- Lindsay, Earl of Crawford
- The Earl of Errol, Lord High Constable
- Torquil of the Oak, Eachin's foster-father
- Norman nan Ord, one of his sons
- MacGillie Chattanach, Chief of the Clan Chattan

== Chapter summary ==
Chrystal Croftangry's Narrative: In discussion with Mrs Baliol, Chrystal Croftangry maintains his preference for setting his stories in less familiar historical periods to allow scope for the imagination.

Ch. 1: The narrator provides a sketch of the history and setting of Perth.

Ch. 2: After a warning from her father, Catherine Glover rebuffs the advances of a nobleman as they walk to church on St Valentine's Eve. On their way home they are joined by Henry Gow, returned from a trip selling armour, who is attacked by Conachar after making denigrating remarks about Highlanders. Catherine expresses her disapproval of the cult of arms.

Ch. 3: Glover and Gow discuss the promotion of the latter's wooing of Catherine.

Ch. 4: Gow foils an attempt to abduct Catherine, cutting off the hand of one of the assailants. The citizens decline Oliver Proudfute's suggestion that the matter be referred to the King.

Ch. 5: The next morning, Catherine thanks Gow for his action by making him her Valentine and Glover encourages him.

Ch. 6: Conachar announces that he has been summoned home to the Highlands. Gow says he will follow Catherine's pacific advice, but she indicates that there is an insuperable objection to their union.

Ch. 7: The citizens resolve to consult the Provost, Sir Patrick Charteris, about the affray. The narrator sketches Sir Patrick's character and background.

Ch. 8: On the way to the Provost at Kinfauns, Proudfute is worsted and plundered by the Devil's Dick. Proudfute presents the severed hand to Charteris, who promises to take action.

Ch. 9: King Robert (introduced by the narrator) discusses the state of affairs with Prior Anselm.

Ch. 10: Robert discusses Rothsay's positive qualities with a sceptical Albany. The Earl of March arrives, threatening to withdraw his allegiance and his presence. Rothsay is seen flirting with the minstrel Louise in the courtyard. Alone with Robert, March maintains that Rothsay's marriage to Marjory of Douglas, in preference a pre-existing contract with his own daughter, is invalid.

Ch. 11: In the courtyard, Rothsay offends both Douglas and March before entrusting Louise to Gow's care.

Ch. 12: Gow and the mantled Louise encounter Proudfute in the street. When they reach his house he entrusts her to his housekeeper Luckie Shoolbred.

Volume Two

Ch. 1 (13): March warns in Council of the danger posed by Douglas before leaving for his castle at Dunbar. Rothsay suggests a combat to settle the feud between the Chattan and Quhele clans. Anselm's request for a commission to investigate the threat of heresy is approved. Rothsay agrees to dismiss his Master of the Horse, Ramorny, for his part in the Gow disturbance.

Ch. 2 (14): In discussion with Father Clement, who is accused of heresy, Catherine says that Conachar will guide him to a Highland retreat. She dismisses his suggestion that she might marry Rothsay if his marriage were to be annulled. Conachar arrives and takes Clement off.

Ch. 3 (15): The physician Dwining persuades the mutilated Ramorny to pursue vengeance against Gow, whom he also hates, and the assassin Bonthron is accordingly dispatched. Dwining administers a sedative, and Ramorny's page prepares him for sleep.

Ch. 4 (16): At the end of the Shrove carnival, Proudfute confirms to Glover that he saw Gow in company with Louise. Tormented by revellers, Proudfute takes refuge with Gow, and on the way home (disguised as the smith) he is killed.

Ch. 5 (17): Intruding on Ramorny, Rothsay rejects his suggestion that he should have Albany killed.

Ch. 6 (18): There is an outcry when Proudfute's murder is discovered: at first it is assumed that Gow is the victim.

Ch. 7 (19): Receiving news of Gow's apparent death, Catherine finds him alive at his house. Glover arrives at Gow's, and on their way to the Council they debate how to respond to the call for the smith to be Magdalen Proudfute's champion.

Ch. 8 (20): The Council agree that the ordeal of bier-right be employed to discover Proudfute's murderer. Magdalen chooses Gow as her champion.

Ch. 9 (21): Robert and Albany discuss how to minimise the impact of Proudfute's murder. Rothsay persuades Robert to forgo his right to stop the clan combat. Robert makes arrangements for the bier-right.

Ch. 10 (22): Dwining tells Ramorny of his ingenious mechanism to preserve Bonthorn's life if he should be hanged in the event of his defeat in combat by Gow. The physician gloats over his gold and his cleverness, and saves the life of Magdalen's sick baby.

Ch. 11 (23): Exposed by the bier-right, and defeated by Gow, Bonthron accuses Rothsay who is forced to retire from Court into the keeping of the Earl of Errol. Gow is feted at a celebratory dinner. Bonthron is apparently executed, but next morning his body has disappeared.

Volume Three

Ch. 1 (24): [retrospective] Dwining and his associates release Bonthorn from the gibbet at midnight.

Ch. 2 (25): Glover demands that Catherine marry Gow. Next morning, she tells him that they (the Glovers) are accused of heresy and will be spared only if she takes the veil. Charteris arrives and offers them his protection.

Ch. 3 (26): Glover tells Charteris Conachar's story, and they agree that Catherine should go to the Duchess of Rothsay at Falkland and her father to Clan Quhele in the Highlands.

Ch. 4 (27): The herdsman Niel Booshalloch clears the way for Glover's reception by Eachin (Conachar). Glover observes the funeral of Eachin's father. He indicates to Father Clement that he is mistrustful of the monk's doctrinal innovations.

Ch. 5 (28): Eachin's inaugural feast is celebrated.

Ch. 6 (29): Eachin confesses his secret cowardice to Glover, and after making it clear that his daughter is not available the citizen takes up residence with Booshalloch. About a fortnight later, he overhears Eachin and his foster-father Torquil discussing a plan to withdraw the young chieftain from the forthcoming combat.

Ch. 7 (30): Ramorny and Dwining persuade Rothsay to escape by boat from Errol's house, and they proceed via Newburgh to Falkland, picking up Louise on the way.

Ch. 8 (31): [the narrative retrogrades] Rothsay, Ramorny, and Dwining make preparations for Catherine's arrival at Falkland. Resisting Rothsay's advances she impresses him with her strength of character. Probably drugged by Dwining, the prince is pronounced infectious.

Ch. 9 (32): After a few days, Louise discovers that Rothsay is imprisoned and deprived of food. Catherine manages to convey some morsels to him, and Louise leaves to seek help, but by the time Douglas arrives Rothsay is dead. Dwining kills himself, and Bonthorne and Ramorny are executed.

Ch. 10 (33): Charteris informs Gow that Eachin is seeking Catherine's hand. Norman nan Ord, one of Torquil's sons, arrives to request a suit of armour for Eachin. After defeating Norman at throwing the hammer Gow agrees, providing that Eachin and he meet in single fight after the clan combat. Douglas and Albany have an uneasy conversation.

Ch. 11 (34): The combat takes place, and at the end Eachin flees the field as the sole survivor of Clan Quhele.

Ch. 12 (35): Albany defends himself against Robert's accusation that he was responsible for murdering Rothsay.

Ch. 13 (36): Under the Duchess of Rothsay's protection at Campsie, Catherine encounters the fugitive Eachin who throws himself into the Tay. Within four months she and Gow are married.

== Reception ==
Almost all the reviewers rated The Fair Maid of Perth extremely highly. There was general praise for the varied cast of contrasting characters, all contributing to a coherent and gripping plot. Dwining was found particularly powerful, and several reviewers thought Catherine more interesting than many of Scott's heroines. The original and sensitive handling of Conachar's cowardice was sometimes singled out for praise, and the final combat between the clans was judged outstanding.

== Departures from historical fact ==
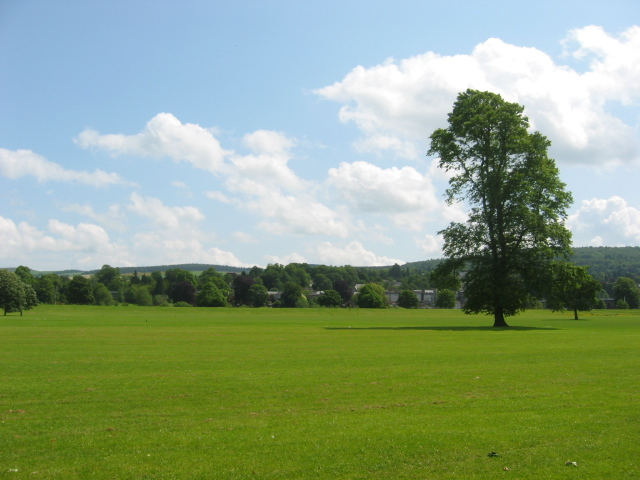
North Inch of Perth, today

Walter Scott does not specify the year of the events depicted: a deliberate vagueness. The novel begins on 13 February, a day before Valentine's Day, and events continue to Palm Sunday. In the novel, the Battle of the North Inch and the death of David Stewart, Duke of Rothesay, take place within those few months. Implied to be followed in short order are first the capture of James, younger son of the king, and then the death of Robert III.

Actually, the events depicted took place in different years. The battle took place in September 1396. The murder of Rothesay occurred in March 1402. James was captured by the English in March 1406. Robert III died in April 1406. Scott manipulates the historic record for dramatic effect, concentrating events of a full decade in the span of six weeks.

The Earl of Douglas depicted in the novel is Archibald the Grim, who actually died in 1400 and was not involved in the death of Rothesay. Scott assigns to him the role played by Archibald Douglas, 4th Earl of Douglas, his son and heir.

== Adaptations ==
- La jolie fille de Perth is an opera in four acts by Georges Bizet (1838–1875), from a libretto by Jules-Henri Vernoy de Saint-Georges and Jules Adenis, after the novel by Sir Walter Scott. It was first performed in 1867.
- Two silent films were made, the first a feature film The Fair Maid of Perth made in 1923 adaption by Eliot Stannard, and the second a short film directed by Miles Mander in the Phonofilm process in 1926, and starring Louise Maurel.

== Other literary inspirations ==
- Letitia Elizabeth Landon's poem The Fair Maid of Perth is a poetical illustration based on an engraving of a painting of that name by A. Chisholm in Fisher's Drawing Room Scrap book, 1839.
