= Peter Gardiner =

Peter Gardiner may refer to:

- Peter Gardiner (actor) (born 1968), Swedish actor and dancer
- Peter Gardiner (sportsman) (1896–1975), Scottish cricketer and footballer
- Peter Gardiner-Hill (1926–2024), English cricketer
