= St John the Baptist Roman Catholic Church, Perth =

St John the Baptist Church
- St John's Roman Catholic Church
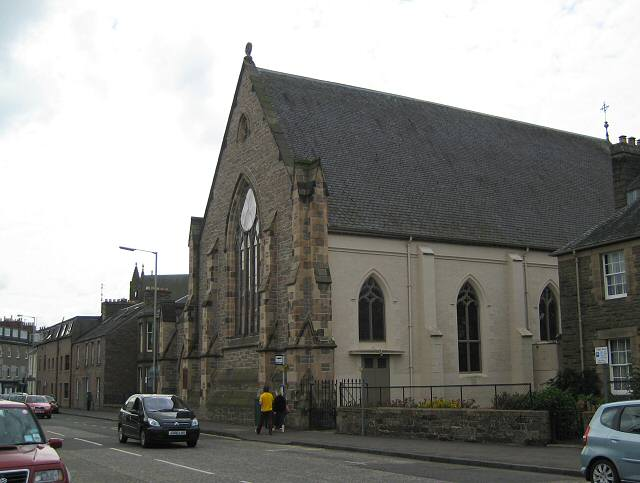
- The building in 2008
- St John the Baptist Church
- 56°23′59″N 3°26′09″W
- Location: 20 Melville Street, Perth, Perth and Kinross
- Country: Scotland
- Denomination: Catholic
- Website: Official website

History
- Status: open
- Dedication: John the Baptist

Architecture
- Functional status: used
- Heritage designation: Category C listed building
- Designated: 26 August 1977
- Completed: 1832 (194 years ago)

Clergy
- Priest: Very Rev. Steven Canon Mulholland

St John the Baptist Church, also known as St John's Roman Catholic Church, is located in Perth, Perth and Kinross, Scotland. It is a Roman Catholic congregation, based on Melville Street, to the north of the city centre. Completed in 1832, it is now a Category C listed building.

A high altar and a new sacristy were added to the church in 1848, and eight years later it was lengthened by 37 feet (11 m). A traceried window was inserted at that time.

In 1892, its roof was raised over the older portion, and its apse completed, the work of Andrew Heiton.

Its parish includes the church of St Mary Magdalene's on Glenearn Road, and it serves the central and northern parts of the Perth, as well as the rural parts north and east of the city.

The church is part of the Roman Catholic Diocese of Dunkeld, which covers east central Scotland. Its priest, since 2018, is the Very Rev. Steven Canon Mulholland.

== See also ==
- List of listed buildings in Perth, Scotland
