= Fair Maid's House =

House in Perth and Kinross, Scotland

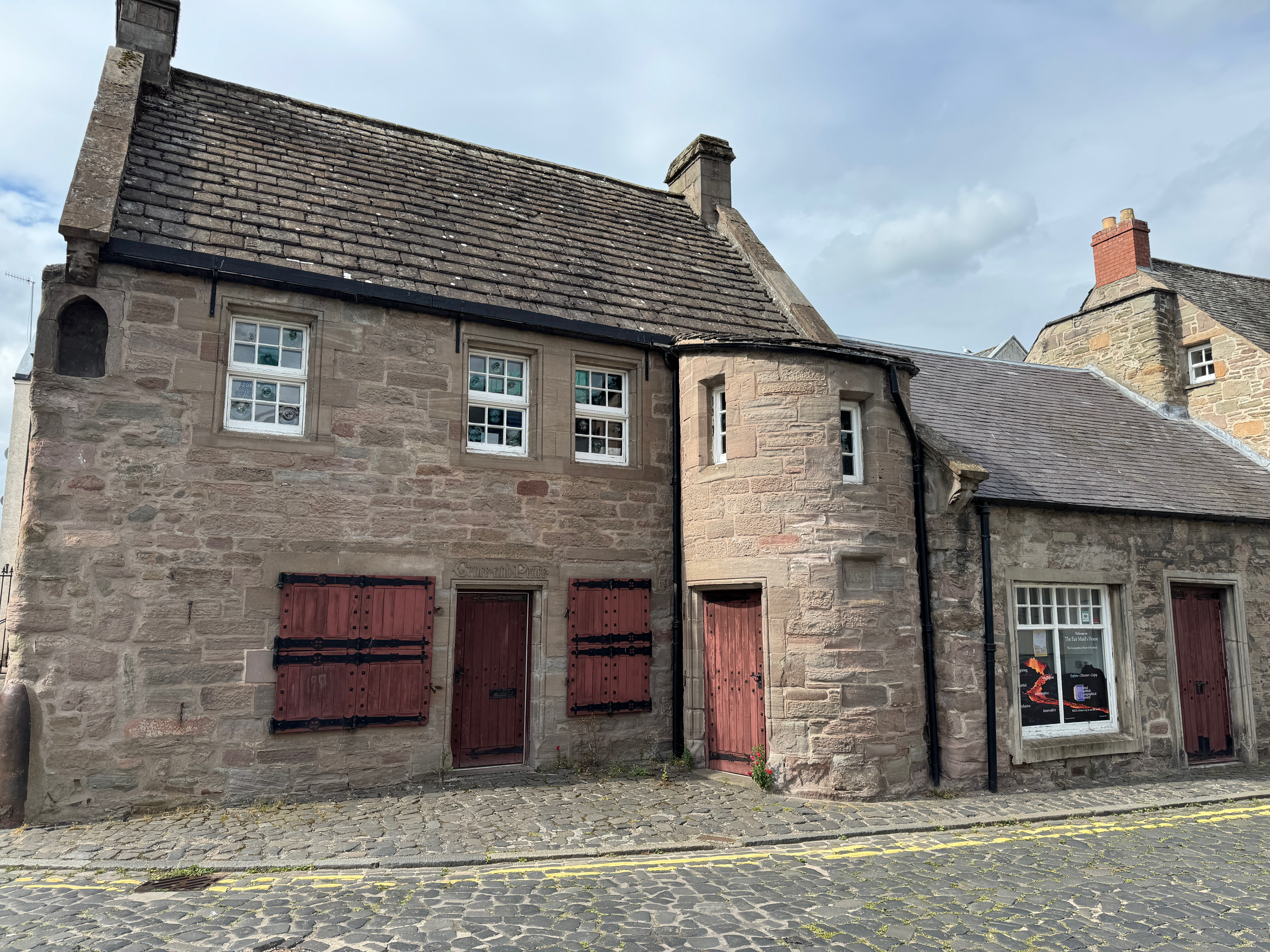
- The building in 2024

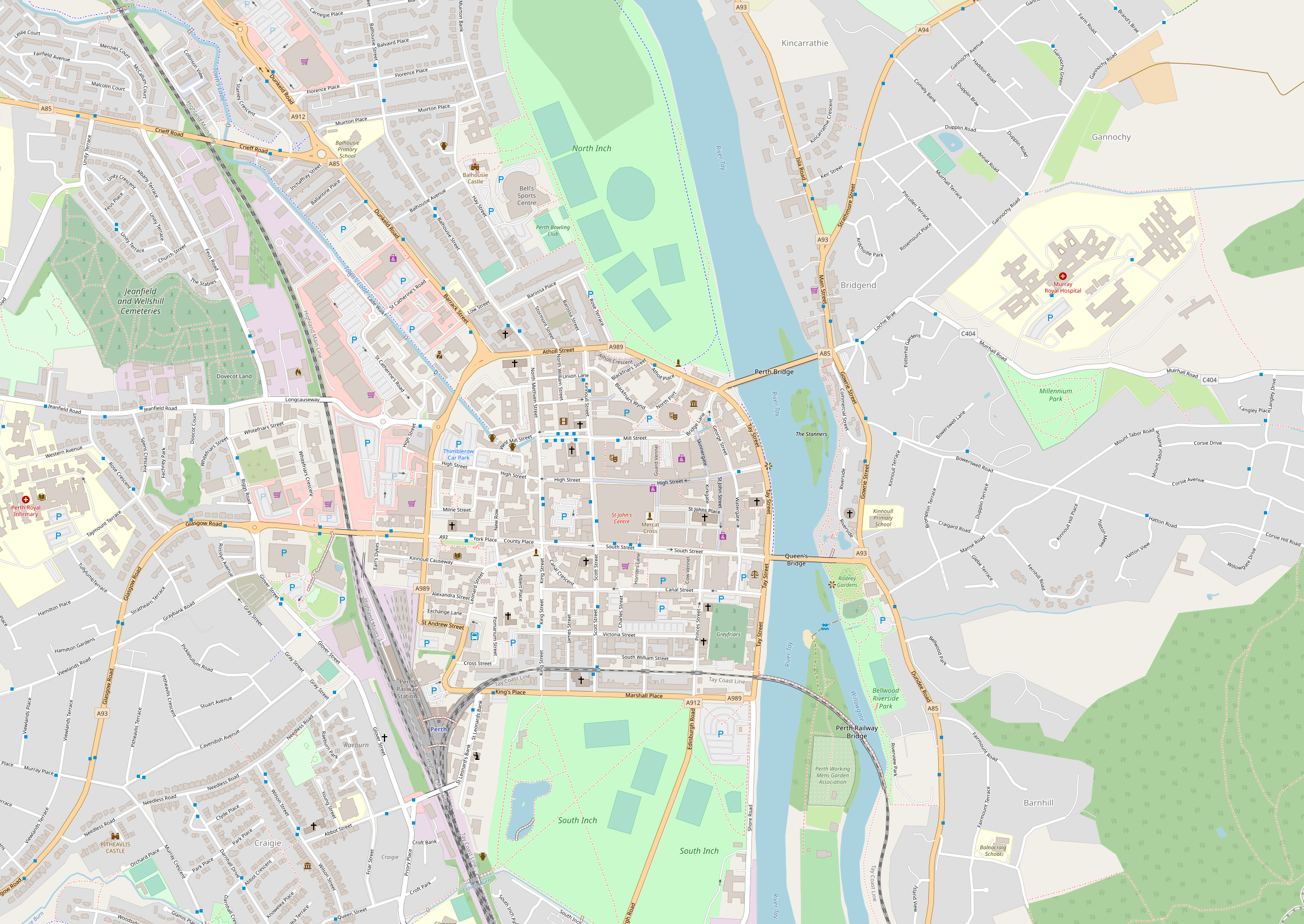
- Shown in Perth
- 56.39824010°N 3.4300659°W
- Location: 21–23 North Port; Perth; Perth and Kinross; Scotland

History
- Built: 1629 (397 years ago)

Listed Building – Category B
- Designated: 20 May 1965
- Reference no.: LB39410

Fair Maid's House is an historic building in the centre of Perth, Perth and Kinross, Scotland. Located in North Port, it is a Category B listed building, partly dating from 1475 but mostly from 1629. It is two storeys, built of rubble, with a stair tower and slated roof. The building is most noted for providing part of the inspiration for Sir Walter Scott's novel The Fair Maid of Perth (1828).

The Glover Incorporation of Perth bought the premises, and used it for their meeting hall for over 150 years. Their motto, "Grace and Peace", is carved above entrance door.

The building still incorporates medieval parts, but most of its masonry has been renewed, and the interior was re-done between 1893 and 1894 by J. & G. Young architects for its then-owner, solicitor William Japp, of Alyth. (An error in an inscription in the exterior wall of the stair tower resulted in its reading 1393, instead of 1893.) A niche on an outside wall reputedly originally contained a curfew bell. A prayer niche and a fireplace on the first floor most likely date from the 15th century.

The north wall of the building was part of the former Blackfriars Monastery (hence the street was formerly known as Blackfriars Wynd), where King James I of Scotland was murdered in 1437. The wall shows the location of two ancient fireplaces and the original level of the floor.

Between 1965 and 1966, antique dealer Thomas Love & Sons used the premises.

The building was restored and extended, at a cost of £750,000, by Page\Park Architects for the Royal Scottish Geographical Society in 2010–11, a project that won a commendation in the Scottish Civic Trust Awards 2012.

== Literature ==
The house was partly the inspiration for Sir Walter Scott's 1828 novel The Fair Maid of Perth, one of his Waverley Novels. The "fair maid" of the title is Catharine Glover. The house is also featured in a verse by the poet William McGonagall.

== Gallery ==
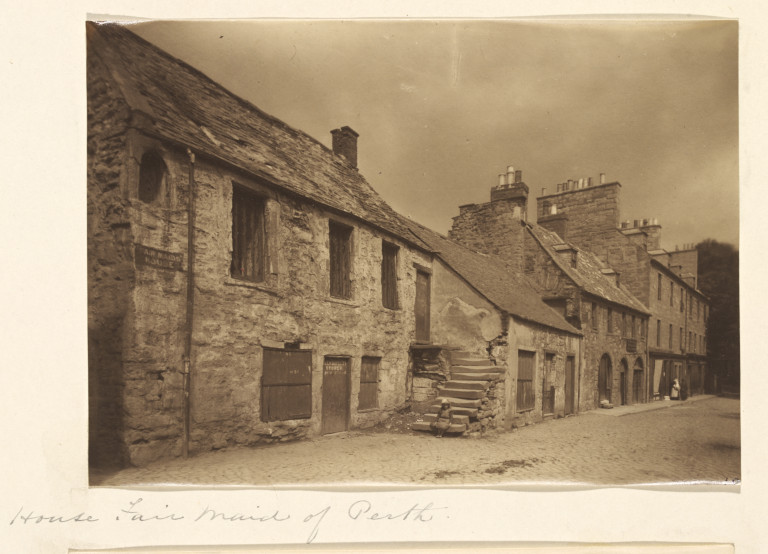
An 1891 view

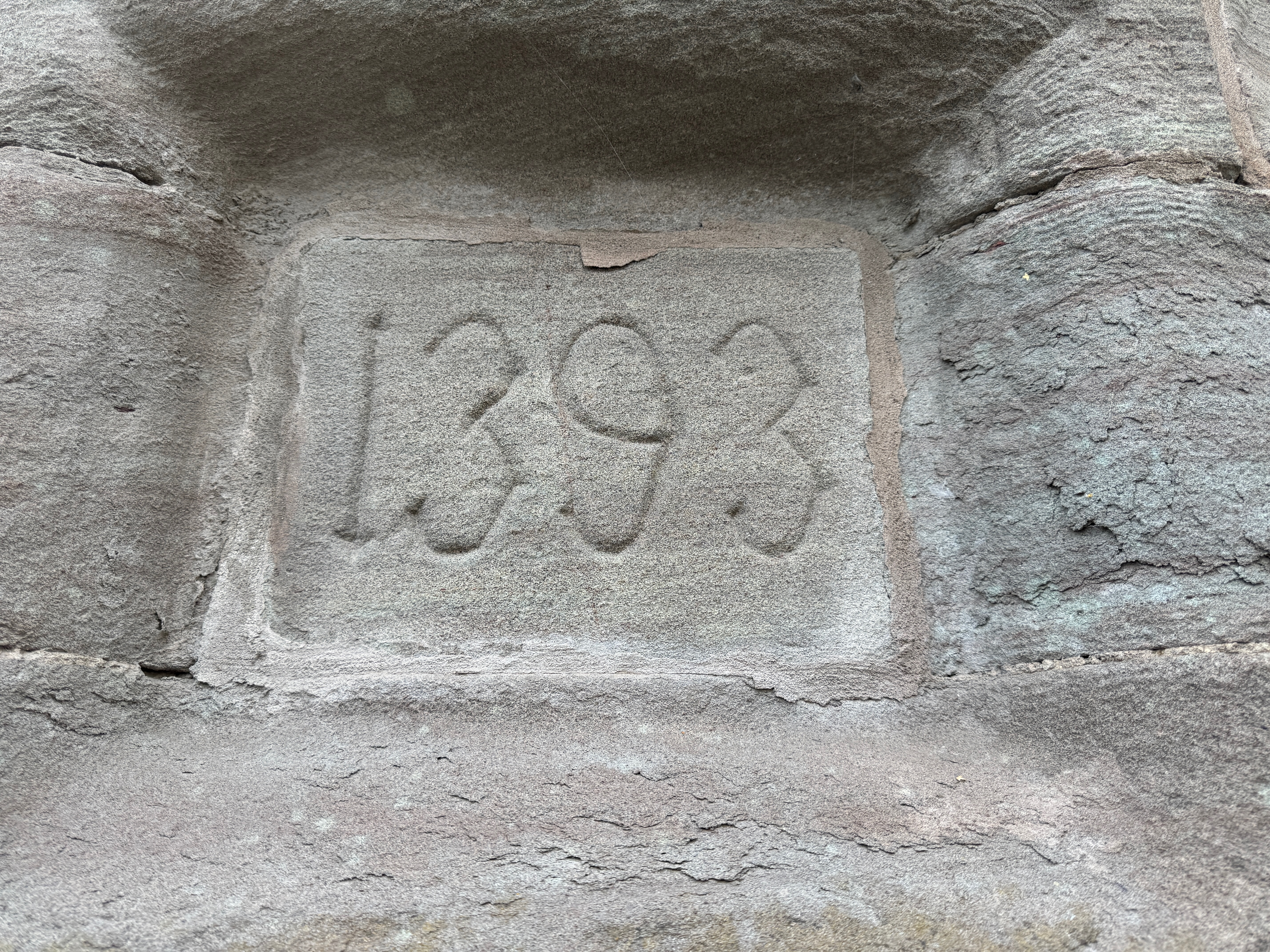
The erroneous date stone on the building's exterior

== See also ==
- List of listed buildings in Perth, Scotland
