= Mailer Hill =

Hill in Perth, Scotland

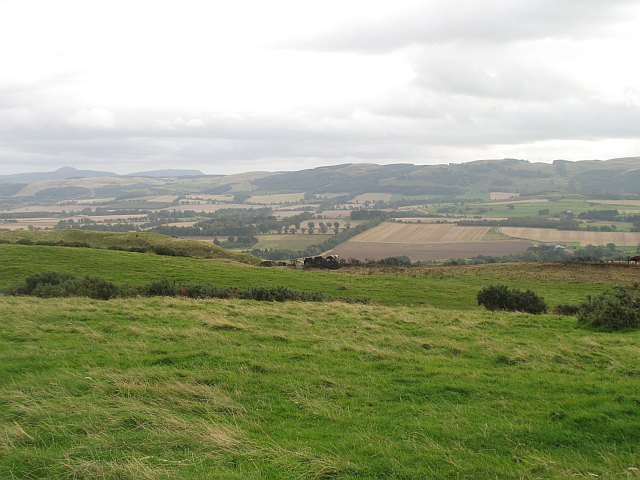
- Looking south from Mailer Hill

Highest point
- Elevation: 182 m (597 ft)
- Coordinates: 56°22′21″N 03°27′22″W

Geography
- Location: Perth, Perth and Kinross, Scotland

Mailer Hill is a hill located 1.9 miles (3.1 km) south-southwest of Perth, Scotland, next to the M90 motorway. Its summit is at 182 metres (597 ft).
