= Joseph E. Anderson =

American politician

Joseph E. Anderson (April 4, 1873 − March 22, 1937) was an American politician.

Anderson was born in Lake Forest, Illinois on April 4, 1873. In 1891, he entered business with his father. He was married October 1, 1901, to Anna Syvertsen. A Prohibitionist, he ran for the Illinois House of Representatives in 1908 unsuccessfully before being successfully elected two years later from the 8th district in 1910. The 8th district included Boone, Lake, and McHenry counties in northern Illinois.

In the 1912 election, Anderson decided, instead of running as a Prohibitionist, to run in the Republican primary which he lost to what American Advance described as "pro-liquor Republicans." During his single term in the House, he served on the following committees: Building and Loan; Drainage and Waterways; Education; Federal Relations; Good Roads; Insurance; Municipal Corporations; and Temperance. He served on the Lake Forest City Council from 1918 to 1921. He died on March 22, 1937. As of 2026, he is the last member of the Prohibition Party to serve in the Illinois General Assembly.
