= Joseph Anderson (cricketer) =

Scottish cricketer and sports outfitter

Personal information
- Full name: Joseph Anderson
- Born: 31 January 1878; Perth, Perthshire, Scotland
- Died: 10 June 1961 (aged 83); Perth, Perthshire, Scotland
- Batting: Right-handed

Domestic team information
- Years: Team
- 1906–1912: Scotland

Career statistics
Competition	First-class
Matches	5
Runs scored	139
Batting average	15.44
100s/50s	–/–
Top score	31
Catches/stumpings	3/–
- Source: Cricinfo, 13 June 2022

Joseph Anderson (31 January 1878 — 10 June 1961) was a Scottish first-class cricketer and sports outfitter.

Anderson was born at Perth in January 1878. A club cricketer for Perthshire, he made his debut in first-class cricket for Scotland against the touring West Indians at Edinburgh in 1906, with his next appearance coming against the touring Australians in 1909. He played two first-class matches against Ireland in 1909 and 1910, before making his final first-class appearance at Perth in 1912 against the touring Australians. Anderson scored 139 runs in his five first-class matches at an average of 15.44, with a highest score of 31 which came against Ireland in 1909. By profession, Anderson was a sports outfitter. Between 1904 and 1914, he produced the annual Scottish cricket annual from his outfitting business. Anderson died at Perth in June 1961.
