= Peter Gardiner (sportsman) =

Scottish cricketer

Personal information
- Full name: Peter Leitham Gardiner
- Born: 22 July 1896; Perth, Perthshire, Scotland
- Died: 15 June 1975 (aged 78); Perth, Perthshire, Scotland
- Batting: Right-handed
- Bowling: Right-arm medium

Domestic team information
- Years: Team
- 1925–1931: Scotland

Career statistics
Competition	First-class
Matches	2
Runs scored	67
Batting average	16.75
100s/50s	–/–
Top score	42
Balls bowled	198
Wickets	3
Bowling average	45.33
5 wickets in innings	–
10 wickets in match	–
Best bowling	2/7
Catches/stumpings	1/–
- Source: Cricinfo, 28 October 2022

Peter Leitham Gardiner (22 July 1896 – 15 June 1975) was a Scottish first-class cricketer and footballer.

Gardiner was born in July 1896 at Perth. A club cricketer for Perthshire, he made two appearances in first-class cricket for Scotland against Ireland six years apart from one another; his first match coming in 1925, with his second match coming in 1931. Both matches were played at College Park, Dublin. He scored 67 runs in these matches, with a highest score of 42. With his right-arm medium pace bowling, he took three wickets at an average of 45.33, with best figures of 2 for 7. Outside of cricket, Gardiner played football for Falkirk and St Johnstone as a goalkeeper.

Gardiner died in Perth in June 1975, aged 78.
