= Mike Kerrigan (cricketer) =

Scottish cricketer (1931–1996)

Personal information
- Full name: Michael Kerrigan
- Born: 8 November 1931; Perth, Perthshire, Scotland
- Died: 5 September 1996 (aged 64); Perth, Perthshire, Scotland
- Batting: Left-handed
- Bowling: Slow left-arm orthodox

Domestic team information
- Years: Team
- 1954–1961: Scotland

Career statistics
Competition	First-class
Matches	12
Runs scored	84
Batting average	6.00
100s/50s	–/–
Top score	18*
Balls bowled	2,737
Wickets	39
Bowling average	22.87
5 wickets in innings	2
10 wickets in match	1
Best bowling	7/84
Catches/stumpings	4/–
- Source: Cricinfo, 29 June 2022

Michael Kerrigan (8 November 1931 — 5 September 1996) was a Scottish first-class cricketer.

Kerrigan was born at Perth in November 1931 and was educated at Abbey School. A club cricketer for Perthshire Cricket Club, Kerrigan made his debut for Scotland in first-class cricket against Derbyshire at Buxton as part of Scotland's 1954 tour of England, with him also playing against the touring Pakistanis later in the season; later in August 1954, Kerrigan and two passengers survived a car accident in Perth. He was a regular member of the Scottish side of the 1950s, making 10 first-class appearances during that decade, followed by a further two against Ireland in 1960 and 1961. Playing as a slow left-arm orthodox spinner in the Scotland side, Kerrigan took 39 wickets in his twelve first-class matches at an average of 22.87. He took two five wicket hauls in first-class cricket, the first coming in 1955 and the second, which saw his best innings figures of 7 for 84, coming against Ireland in 1960; it was in this match that he took a further three wickets to give him his only ten-wicket haul in a match.

Kerrigan collapsed while playing golf with a friend at Murrayshall and subsequently died at the Perth Royal Infirmary on 5 September 1996.
