= Perth Museum =

City museum in Perth, Scotland

Coordinates: 56°23′45″N 3°25′46″W

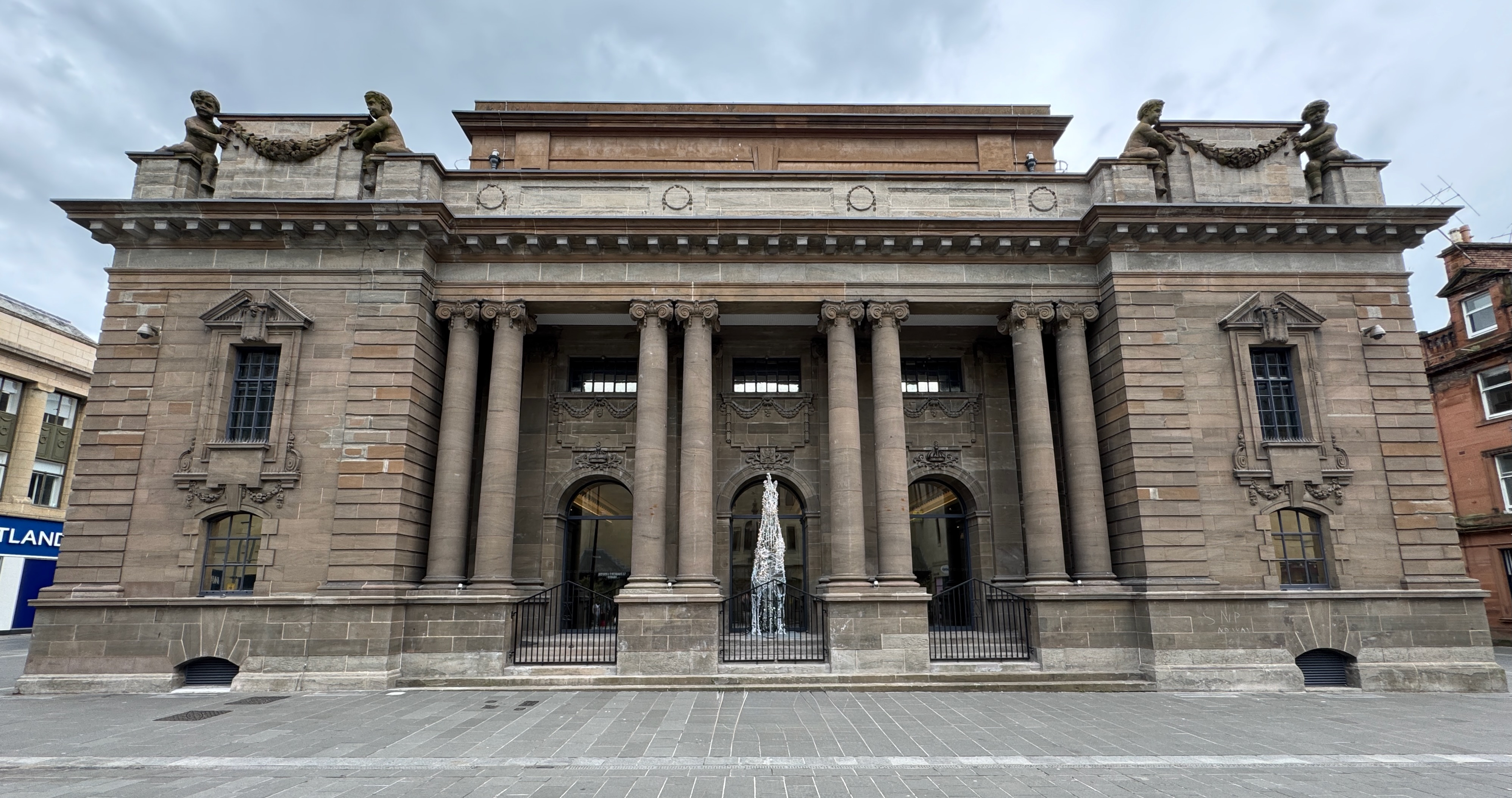
- Pictured in 2024
- Established: 30 March 2024
- Location: Perth City Hall, Perth, Scotland
- Owners: Culture Perth & Kinross
- Website: perthmuseum.co.uk

Perth Museum is the principal museum in the city of Perth in central Scotland.

Opening in 2024 in the former Perth City Hall building, the museum took on a number of exhibits from the former Perth Museum and Art Gallery. It also provides a permanent exhibition space for the Stone of Scone, the United Kingdom's coronation stone, which originated nearby in the Perthshire village of Scone – the ancient crowning place of the monarchs of Scotland.

The museum aims to showcase the city's collections as well as recognising Perth's status as a former capital of the Kingdom of Scotland.

The museum's building is located adjacent to the historic St John's Kirk, facing onto King Edward Street and accessed from St John's Place. Opened in 1914 the City Hall provided an events space, before being closed in 2005 with the construction of the Perth Concert Hall.

== History ==
In January 2019, BAM Construction began work on a £30 million programme of works to convert the Perth City Hall into a new heritage and arts attraction based on a design by Mecanoo. The new attraction would incorporate displays on the Stone of Destiny and the Kingdom of Alba.

A competition to name the building's forthcoming museum section was launched in March 2022, with the winning name being "Perth Museum", with 60% of the votes.

The museum was shortlisted for the Art Fund Museum of the Year Award 2025.

== The collection ==
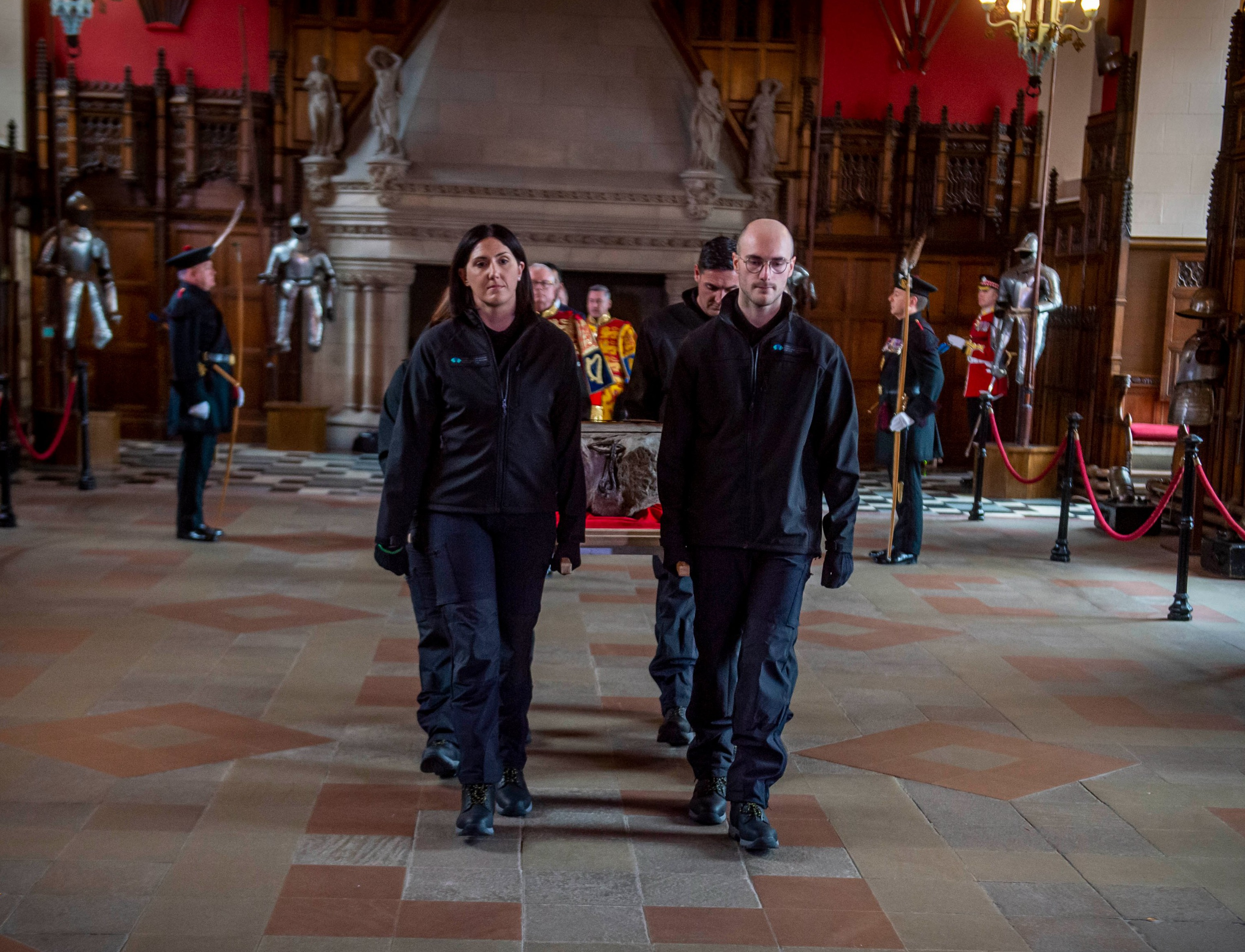
The Stone of Scone

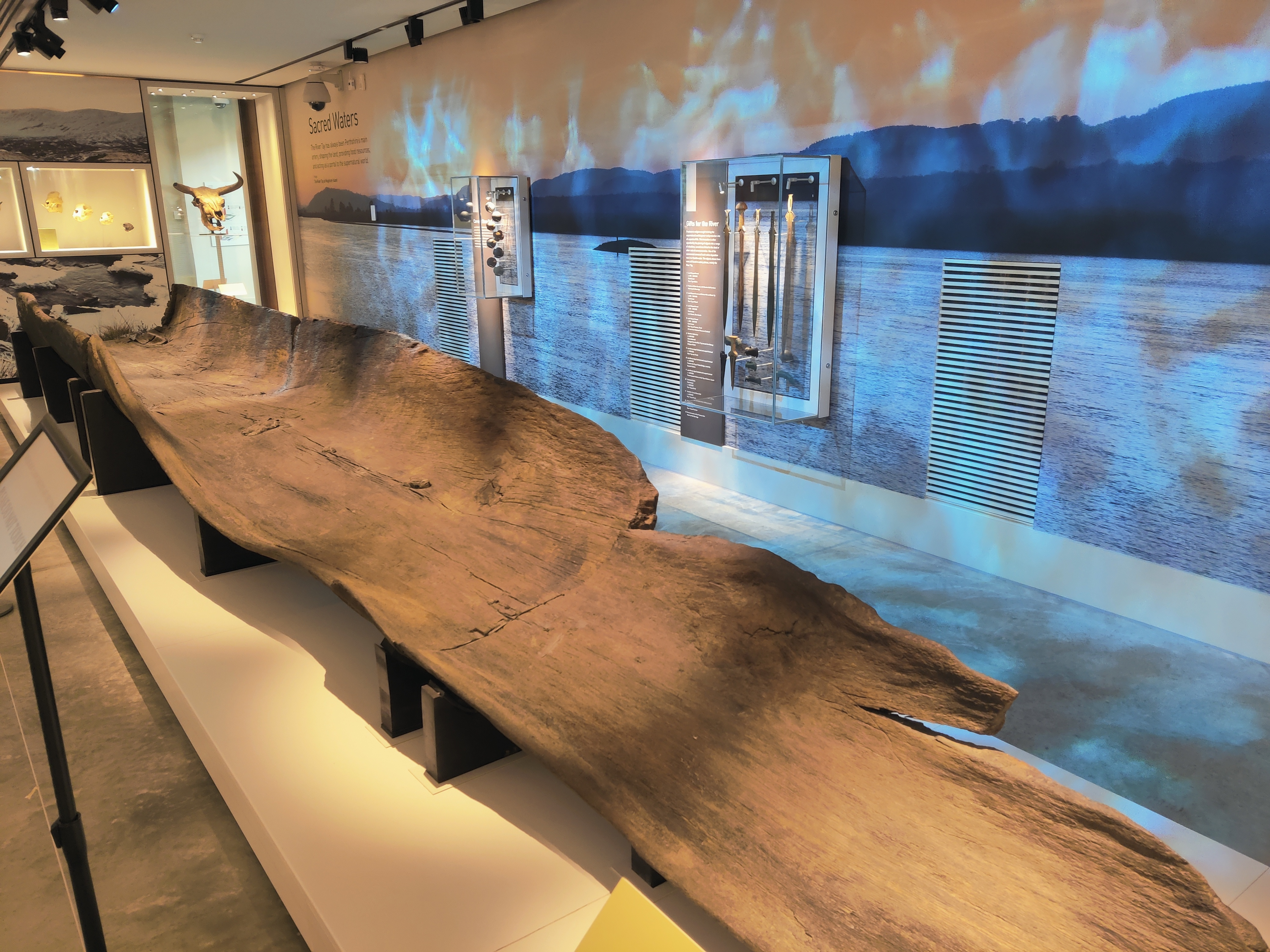
The Bronze Age Carpow Logboat

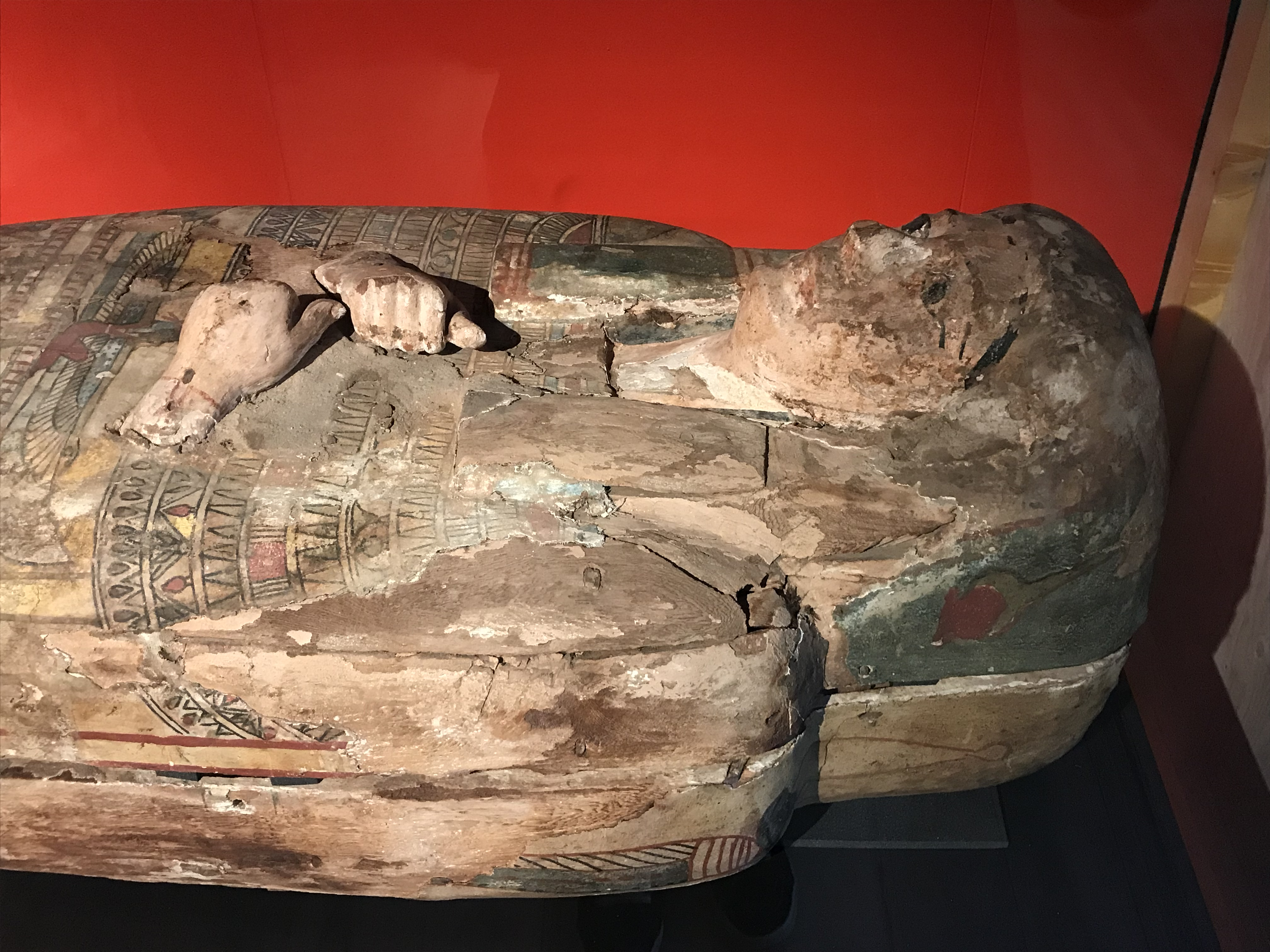
The sarcophagus of Ta-Kr-Hb

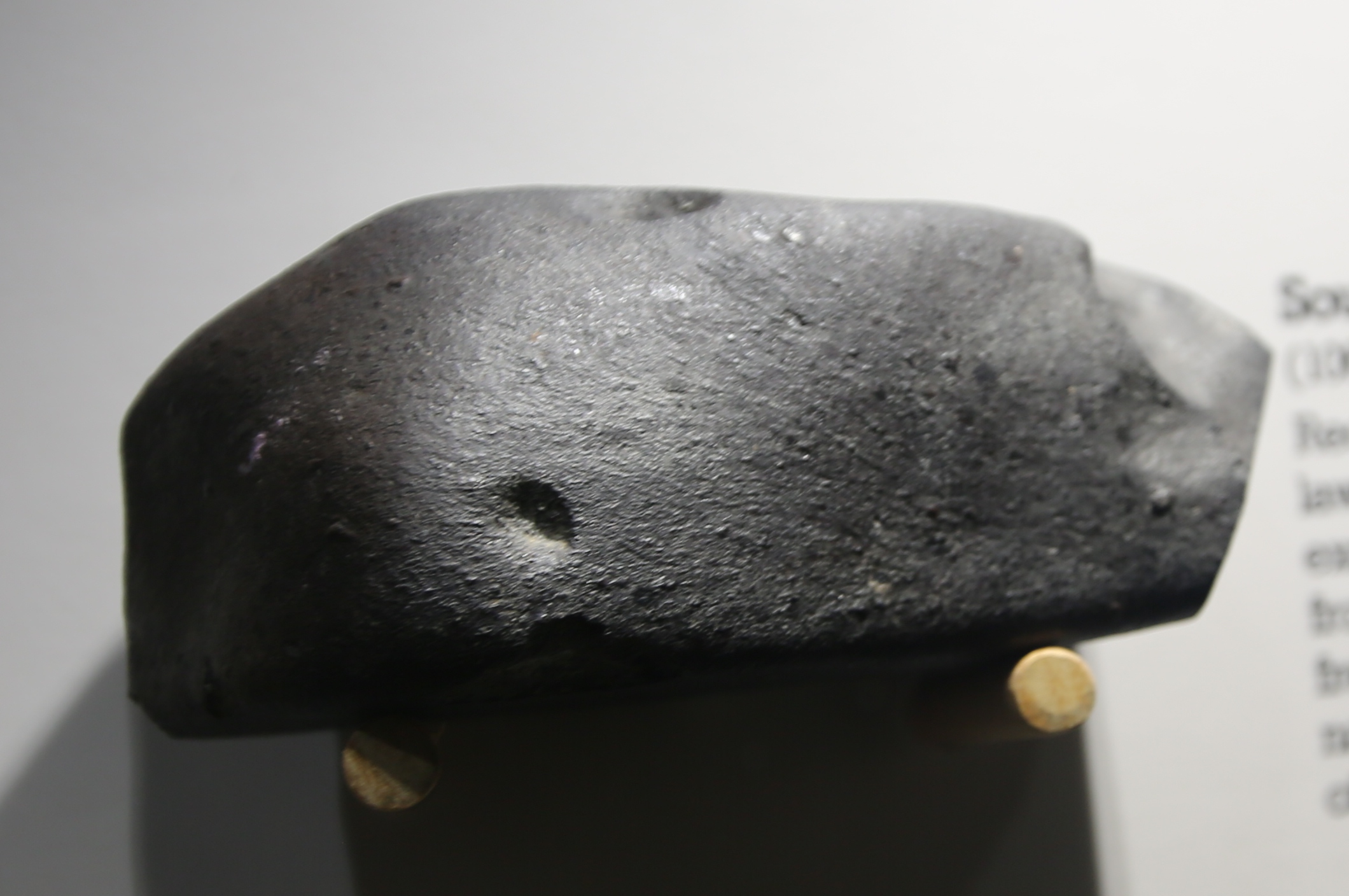
Fragment of the Strathmore meteorite

The centrepiece of the museum is the Stone of Destiny. The museum is also home to the mummified remains of an egyptian or Kushite woman named Ta-Kr-Hb.

The collection also includes the 3,000-year-old Carpow Logboat, excavated from the Firth of Tay in 2001; the 17th century Glovers Incorporation dancing dress; and a cast of the record-breaking salmon caught in the Tay by Georgina Ballantine in 1922.

The museum, in collaboration with the British Museum and Māori advisors, has restored a rare cloak from New Zealand made entirely of kākāpō feathers. Dating from the 1810s–1820s it is thought to be the only one in existence.
