= St John's Kirk =

- The Parish Church of Saint John the Baptist
- Old Church
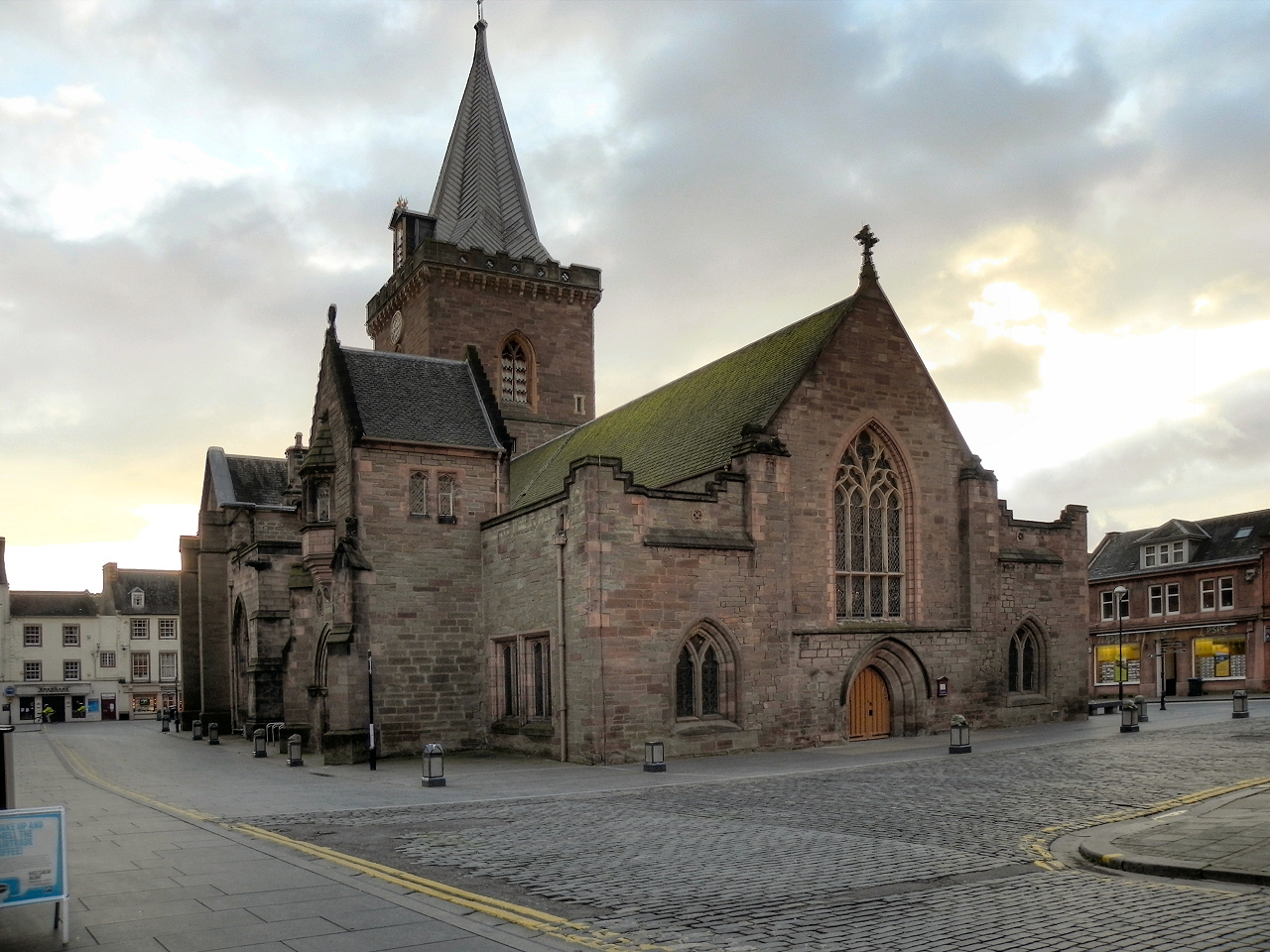
- The kirk in 2011, looking east
- St John's Kirk
- 56°23′45″N 3°25′41″W
- Location: Perth, Perth and Kinross
- Country: Scotland
- Denomination: Church of Scotland
- Previous denomination: Roman Catholic
- Website: Official website

History
- Status: Active
- Founded: 12th century
- Dedication: John the Baptist

Architecture
- Functional status: Parish church
- Heritage designation: Category A listed building
- Designated: 20 May 1965
- Years built: c. 1448 (578 years ago)

St John's Kirk is a Parish church in the Scottish city of Perth, Perth and Kinross, located on St John's Place, in the city centre alongside the Perth Museum (formerly Perth City Hall). It stands on the former site of a church dating to 1126. Today's structure, built around 1448, is a Category A listed building. The church is most noted for being the site of John Knox's 1559 sermon against idolatry, which began the Scottish Reformation.

Perth was originally called St Johns Toun (or Saint Johnstoun), after John the Baptist, to whom the church is dedicated.

The church is bounded by St John's Place to the north (fed by Kirkgate) and south (as South St John's Place, fed by St Ann's Lane), St John Street to the east and Flesher's Vennel to the west.

== Earlier structure ==
There has been a church on the site since 1126, when King David I withdrew funds to support Dunfermline Abbey. It was likely not completed until 1242, however, which is when it was dedicated by David de Bernham, the bishop of St Andrews.

The heart of King Alexander III was buried at the location in 1286.

King Edward I heard mass at the church during his 1296 invasion of Scotland, the First War of Scottish Independence. Kings Charles I, Charles II and Prince Charles Edward Stuart are all known to have worshipped there.

== Today's church ==
The present church, cruciform in shape, is a result of a 15th-century rebuild. The choir is now the oldest part of the building, dating to 1448.

The central tower is understood to have been the model for the two towers of St Machar's Cathedral in Aberdeen. The upper room of the tower was once used as a prison for prostitutes, but it was removed in 1823. The north porch is known as Halkerston's Tower, likely after architect John Halkerston, who worked at the church in the 1460s.

Before the Scottish Reformation, the incorporations of crafts in Perth had altars in the church. The wrights (carpenters) and barbers maintained an altar dedicated to "Our Lady of Pity". A craftsman who broke the rules would pay a fine in wax for the altar lights.

On 11 May 1559, minister and founder of the Presbyterian Church of Scotland John Knox preached against idolatry in the kirk, which marked the beginning of the Reformation in Scotland. After the sermon, the congregation stoned the priest, removed ornamentation from the church, and then went to nearby Greyfriars, Blackfriars and Charterhouse monasteries, "stripping them back to their bare walls". St John's Kirk was subsequently divided into three separate churches — East, Middle and West — each with its own minister.

Until 1580, the surrounds of the church was the principal cemetery of Perth. While there are several burials still in the vicinity, prominent citizens were buried within the church.

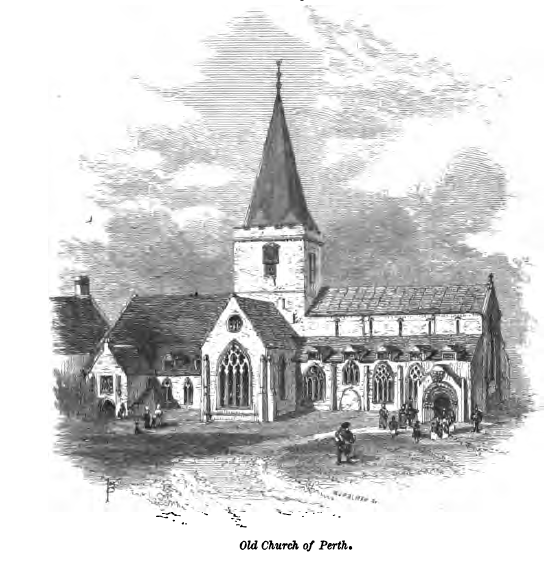
The church in 1860

James Gillespie Graham reduced the north transept in 1825 in order to improve traffic flow. He also carried out repairs on the building. Another restoration was done by Sir Robert Lorimer as a memorial to the men of Perthshire who lost their lives in World War I. Knox Chapel was dedicated to those who later fell in World War II. It was at the time of Graham's work that the church's interior partitions were removed, uniting the congregation once more. Lorimer also reinstated the upper floor of Halkerston's Tower.

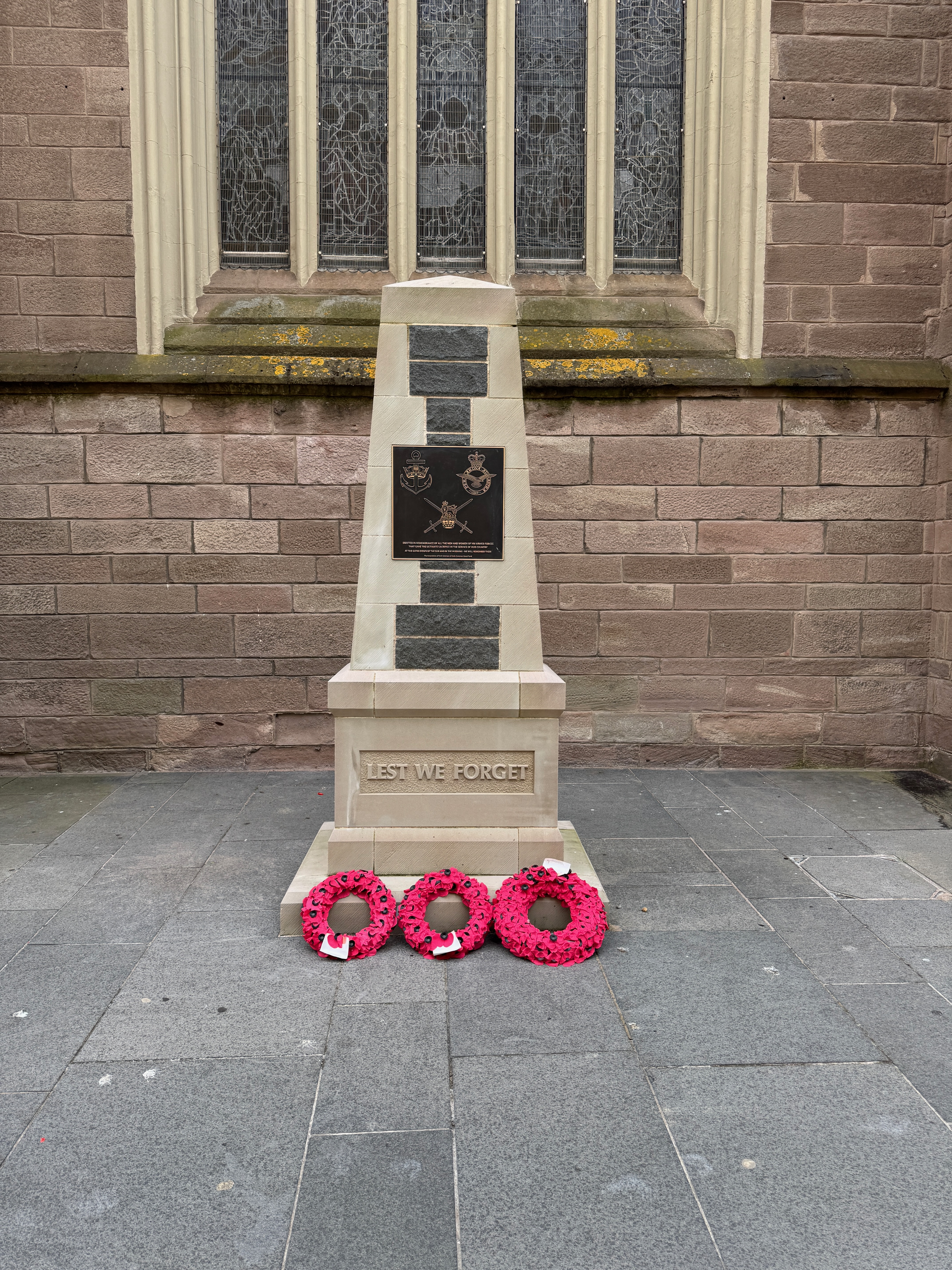
Perth's war memorial beside the St John's Street elevation of the church

Queen Elizabeth the Queen Mother, visited in 1955 to dedicate the Black Watch Window. Elizabeth II and the Prince Philip, Duke of Edinburgh, visited the church during their Silver Jubilee visit to Perth in 1977.

Pre-Reformation features of the church include holy water stoups, piscina, a stone niche and mason's marks. There is also a medieval collection box and a modern tapestry.

Repair and restorations occurred in the 1980s and in the early 21st century. The chandelier of the Virgin Mary, which is believed to have hung in the church in the 15th century, was restored to the building. It had been sold to Perth Museum and Art Gallery in the 19th century.

The spire's weathercock was removed and restored in 2020.

Perth's first dedicated war memorial was unveiled in St John Street, at the rear of the church, in 2021. Prior remembrance services were carried out at the Perth mercat cross, between Perth City Hall and St John's Shopping Centre, which was perceived to be "an insult" to veterans.

== Stained glass ==
The church's early stained glass is the work of Ballantine and Allan, Stephen Adam and Douglas Strachan.

The stained-glass Blue Window in the northwest corner of the church is the work of American glazier Harvey Salvin, whilst the Black Watch Window and St Christopher window were created by William Wilson.

== Bells ==
Contained within the church building are 63 bells, a greater number than any other church in the British Isles. Of these, 35 form the active carillon installed in 1935, which is housed in the main tower belfry; the remainder are disused (13 hang in the side belfry on the north side of the spire which are visible from the outside, and the remaining 15 hang in a metal frame at floor level within the church building).

The Ave Maria bell, which hangs in the side belfry dates from about 1340. The disused "Agnus Dei" bell which is one of the 15 bells at floor level probably dates from the early 16th century. The bourdon or largest bell of the carillon, weighing 1429 kg, is an extremely fine casting by Peter Waghevens of Mechlin (Malines) and is dated 1506. This is one of the finest pre-reformation bells in existence. There are five Flemish chime bells (at floor level), dated 1526, which bear no maker's name but may be the work of Willem van den Ghein of Mechlin. In all there are eight bells at St John's which date from before the Reformation.

The modern carillon consists of the bourdon bell by Peter Waghevens (1506), and 34 bells cast by Gillett & Johnston (1934). The whole carillon was set up for playing in the Croydon bell foundry in January 1935, and was inspected by the Prime Minister, Ramsay MacDonald. The bourdon hands in a lowside cast-iron frame for full circle ringing, the other 34 bells are hung dead in a metal framework to one side of the bourdon over five levels. These 35 bells are not visible from street level. The manual transmission of the carillon was replaced; the bell frame cleaned down and repainted by John Taylor & Co in 2022.

== Gallery ==
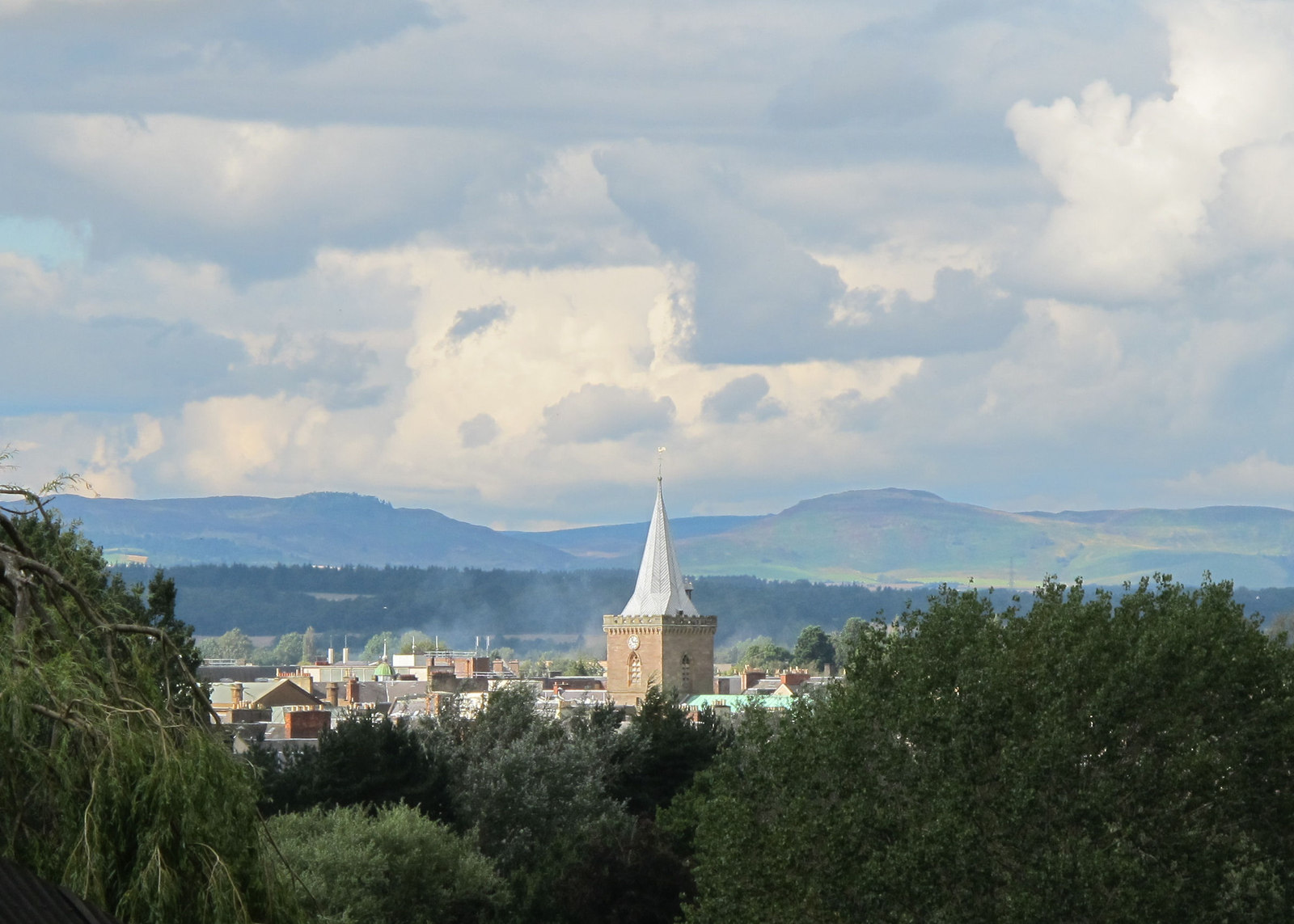
The church's tower above the rooftops, looking west from Bridgend

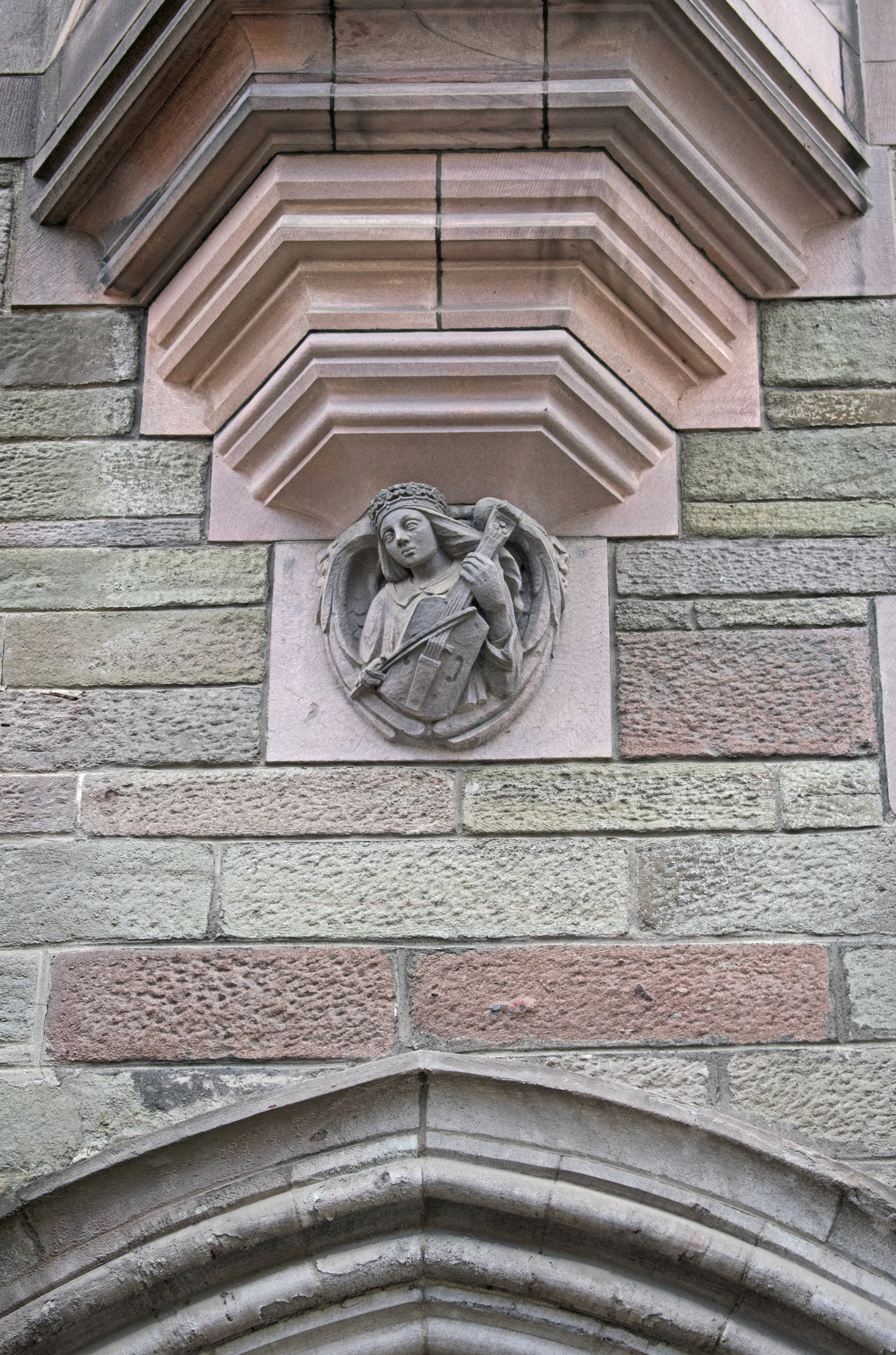
Figure of an angel above the north portal

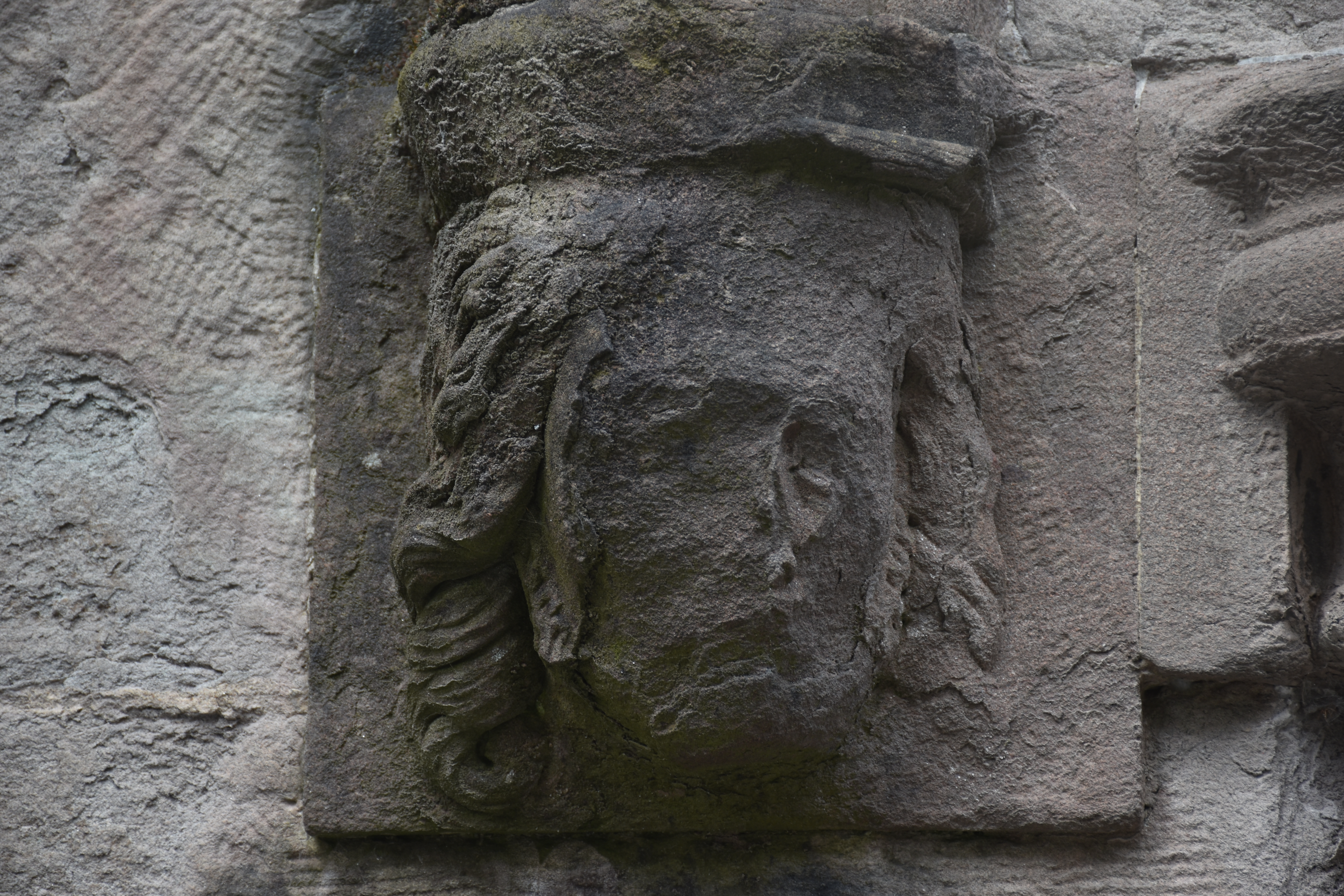
Head (left), South Door

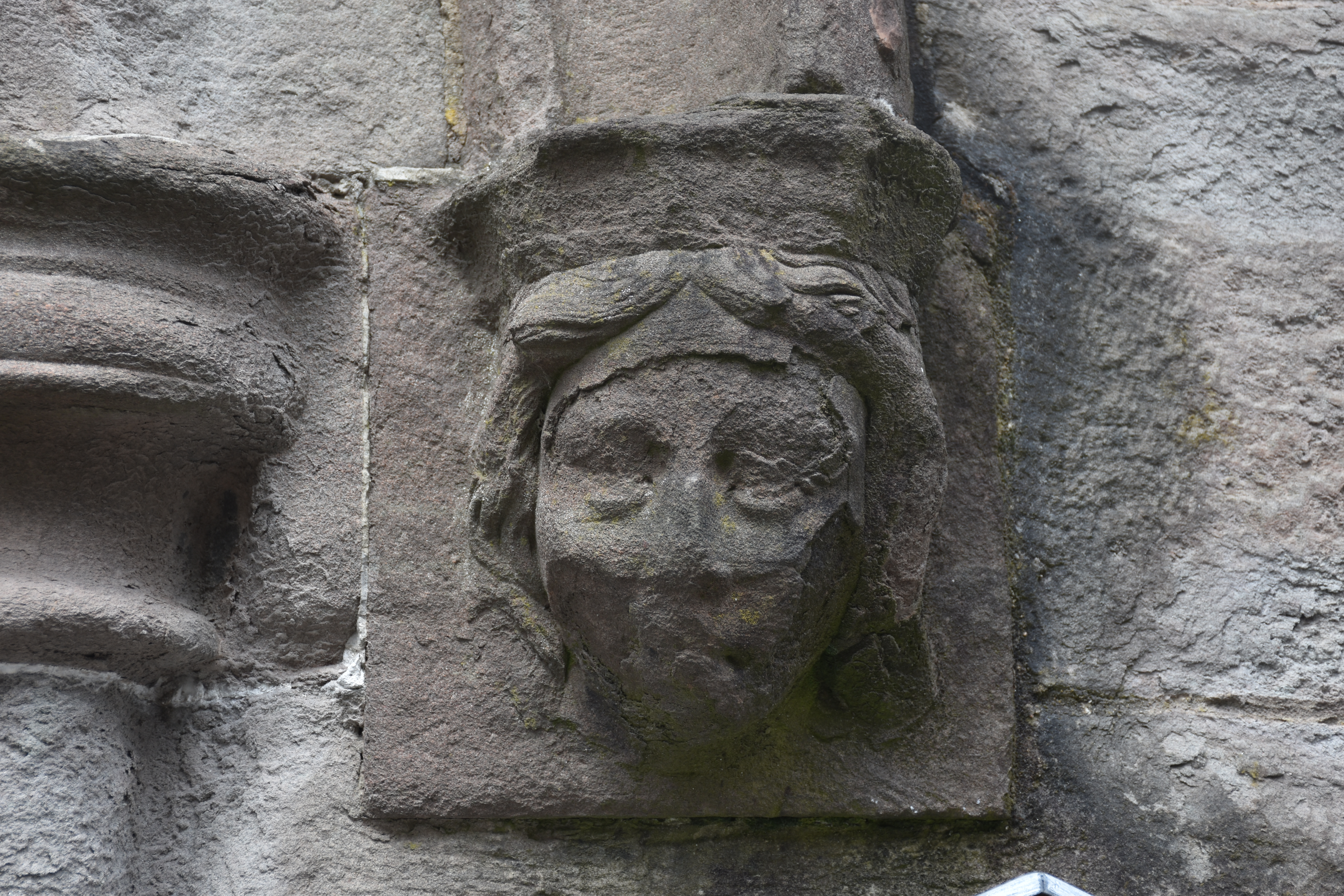
Head (right), South Door

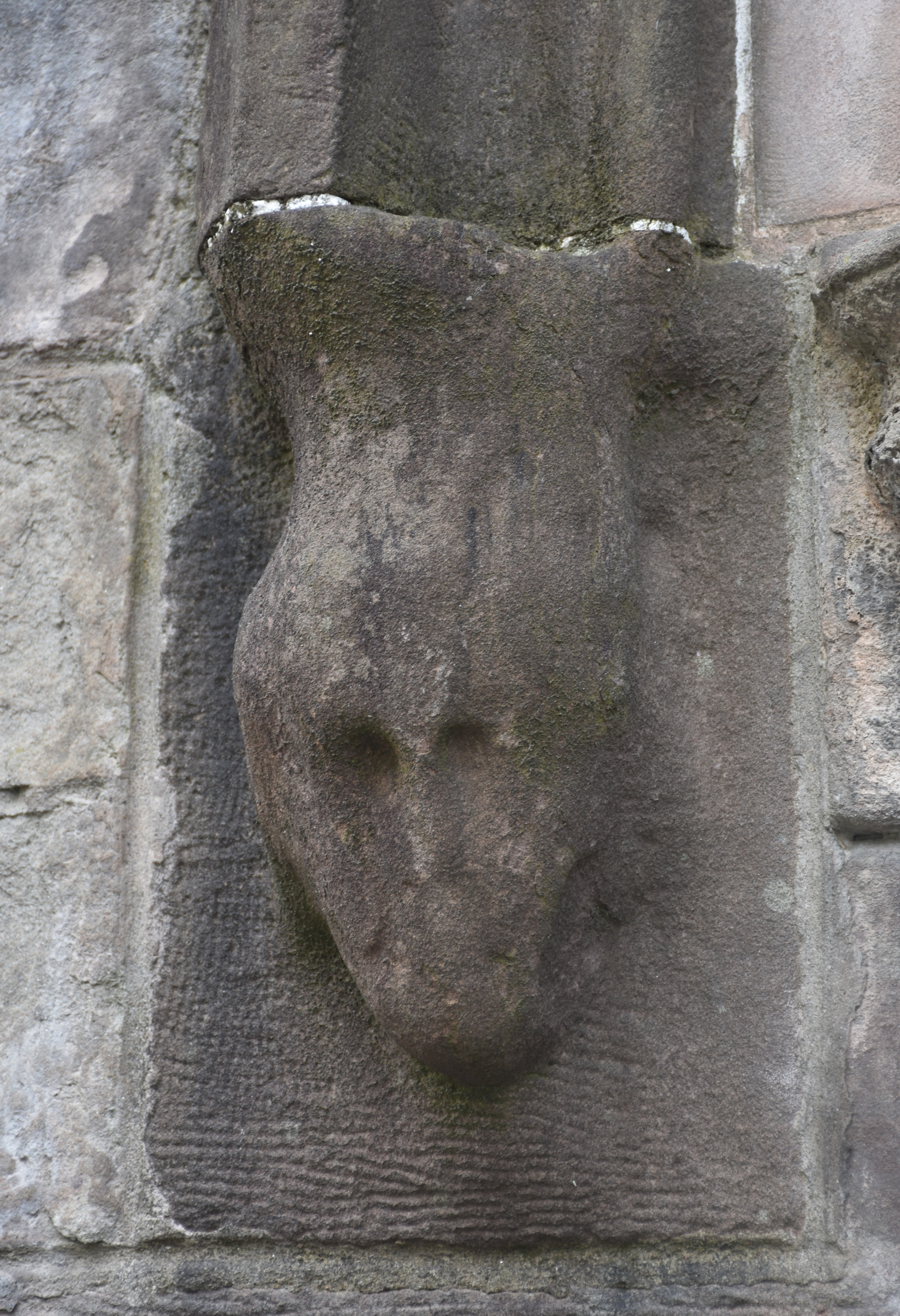
Head (left), North Door

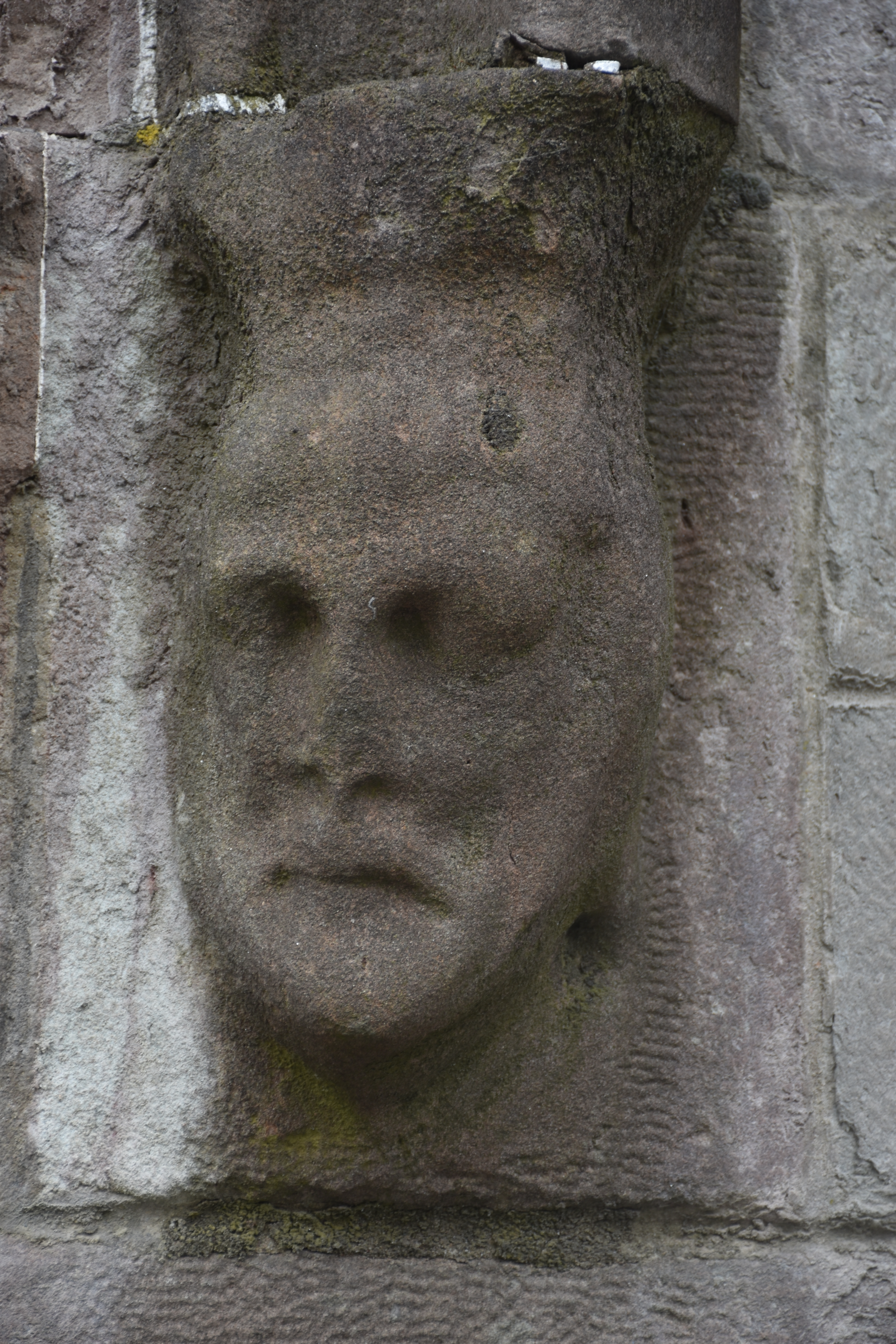
Head (right), North Door

== See also ==
- List of carillons of the British Isles
- List of Category A listed buildings in Perth and Kinross
- List of listed buildings in Perth, Scotland

== Bibliography ==
- Forthergill, Rhoda, Rita Hartley and Sue Hendry (2010), Walks Around Historic Perth. Perth and Kinross Heritage Trust, Perth
- Gifford, John (2007), The Buildings of Scotland: Perth and Kinross. Yale University Press, New Haven and London
- Haynes, Nick (2000), Perth & Kinross: An Illustrated Architectural Guide. The Rutland Press, Edinburgh
