= Thomas Love & Sons =

Scottish antiques dealer

- A c. 1900 view of the now-demolished Thomas Love & Sons warehouses at 12–19 St John's Place, looking west towards King Edward Street
- Industry: Antique dealers, furniture removal
- Founded: 1869
- Founder: Thomas Love
- Defunct: 2009
- Headquarters: Perth, Scotland, UK
- Area served: United Kingdom

Thomas Love & Sons was an auctioneer, upholsterer, removers, house furnisher and antique dealer in the 19th, 20th and 21st centuries. Based in Perth, Scotland, it was in business for 140 years, from 1869 to 2009. It had four known locations in Perth during its existence: at 12–19 St John's Place (c. 1900–1960), in Canal Street (1948), in South Street (1960–1970) and in the Fair Maid's House (1965–1966).

The liveries of the company's two-ton Lacre trucks in 1914 listed their services as "Decorations, Furniture, Curtains, Carpets, Bedding".

The company's furniture was listed as being used at Blair Castle in the mid-20th century.

The company became a member of BADA in 1948.
