= St John's Place =

Prominent street in Perth, Scotland

- Kirkside (former)
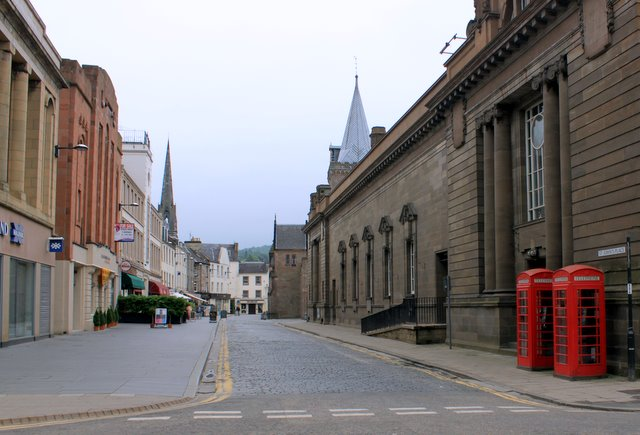
- The northern side of Perth City Hall, looking east along St John's Place from King Edward Street in 2010. St John's Kirk stands beyond City Hall
- Interactive map of St John's Place
- Length: 0.094 mi (0.151 km)
- Location: Perth, Perth and Kinross, Scotland
- West end: King Edward Street
- East end: St John Street

Construction
- Completed: 12th century

St John's Place (formerly part of Kirkside) is an ancient street in the city of Perth, Scotland, located a short distance southeast of the city centre. Today it runs for about 500 feet (170 yd) between King Edward Street to the west and St John Street to the east; it is now markedly longer than when it was originally laid out, due to the construction of Perth City Hall in 1914. Construction of St John's Shopping Centre in 1987 saw the loss of the short-lived St John's Square, which was created in the 1960s on the opposite side of King Edward Street. There is also a South St John's Place, while North St John's Place (formerly College Yard) existed in the early 20th century.

The street was established in at least the 12th century, prior to being given its current name, which is derived from St John's Kirk. The church, which stands at the junction of St John's Place and St John Street, is a Category A listed structure. It was completed around 1448, replacing another church dating to 1126.

Antique dealers Thomas Love & Sons (1869–2009) occupied 12–19 St John’s Place between the late 19th century and 1960. In 1898, it connected its two warehouses with an overbridge.

A late-19th-century view of the now-demolished Thomas Love & Sons at 12–19 St John's Place, looking west towards King Edward Street

== Listed buildings in St John's Place ==
- St John's Kirk (Category A)
- 3 St John's Place (Category B)
- 5–8 St John's Place (Category C)
- 9 and 10 St John's Place (Category B)

== Vennels ==
The below vennels begin or end on St John's Place.

- Baxters Vennel (St John's Place to Watergate) – Baxter is the old Scots name for baker
- Fleshers' Vennel (St John's Place to 49 South Street)
- Salt Vennel – one of the Kirk vennels
- School Vennel
