= List of public art in Perth and Kinross =

Map of Scotland with the Perth and Kinross council area highlighted

This is a list of public art in Perth and Kinross, one of the 32 local government council areas of Scotland. This list applies only to works of public art on permanent display in an outdoor public space and does not, for example, include artworks in museums.

== Aberfeldy ==
Image	Title / subject	Location and coordinates	Date	Artist / designer	Type	Material	Dimensions	Designation	Wikidata	Notes
More images	Black Watch Regiment monument	Taybridge Drive, Aberfeldy	1887	William Birnie Rhind	Statue on cairn with reliefs	Stone and boulder stones		Category B	Q17829649	
More images	War memorial	Birk's o'Aberfeldy Park, Aberfeldy	1922	R.Cameron, architect	Arched gateway, gates and plaques	Sandstone, wrought iron, stone		Category C	Q77777823	

== Alyth ==
Image	Title / subject	Location and coordinates	Date	Artist / designer	Type	Material	Dimensions	Designation	Wikidata	Notes
	Second Boer War memorial	Alyth	c.1905		Obelisk	Stone				
	War memorial	Alyth	1922	William Kellock Brown	Statue on pedestal	Bronze and stone		Category C	Q56615157	Architects, Wright & Wylie.

== Auchterarder ==
Image	Title / subject	Location and coordinates	Date	Artist / designer	Type	Material	Dimensions	Designation	Wikidata	Notes
	War memorial	Auchterarder	1921	John Stewart of Stewart & Paterson	Cross on pillar and steps	Metal and stone				

== Blairgowrie ==
Image	Title / subject	Location and coordinates	Date	Artist / designer	Type	Material	Dimensions	Designation	Wikidata	Notes
More images	War memorial	Wellmeadow Gardens, Blairgowrie	1921	Reginald Fairlie & Alexander Carrick (sculptor)	Pillar with statue and panels	Stone and bronze		Category A	Q17572334	

== Crieff ==
Image	Title / subject	Location and coordinates	Date	Artist / designer	Type	Material	Dimensions	Designation	Wikidata	Notes
	War memorial	Crieff	1921	Peter McGregor-Chalmers	Inscribed cross on pillar	Sandstone		Category B	Q17837335	

== Dunkeld ==
Image	Title / subject	Location and coordinates	Date	Artist / designer	Type	Material	Dimensions	Designation	Wikidata	Notes
	War memorial	Dunkeld	1921		Cairn with plaques	Stone blocks				

== Invergowrie ==
Image	Title / subject	Location and coordinates	Date	Artist / designer	Type	Material	Dimensions	Designation	Wikidata	Notes
	War memorial	Invergowrie			Celtic wheel cross	Granite				

== Kenmore ==
Image	Title / subject	Location and coordinates	Date	Artist / designer	Type	Material	Dimensions	Designation	Wikidata	Notes
	War memorial	Parish Church, Kenmore	1921	Messers Garden & Co	Celtic wheel cross	Granite				

== Kinross ==
Image	Title / subject	Location and coordinates	Date	Artist / designer	Type	Material	Dimensions	Designation	Wikidata	Notes
	Robert Burns Begg	Kinross	1900		Relief and pillar	Granite				
	War memorial	High Street, Kinross	1921		Pillar on pedestal	Stone				

== Longforgan ==
Image	Title / subject	Location and coordinates	Date	Artist / designer	Type	Material	Dimensions	Designation	Wikidata	Notes
	Mercat cross	Main Street, Longforgan	Late 17th century, restored 1989		Statue on column	Stone		Category A	Q17574491	
	War memorial	Main Street, Longforgan	c. 1920		Column on pedestal	Sandstone		Category C	Q56619854	

== Milnathort ==
Image	Title / subject	Location and coordinates	Date	Artist / designer	Type	Material	Dimensions	Designation	Wikidata	Notes
	War memorial	Milnathort	1921	Pilkington Jackson	Obelisk	Stone	6.1m high			

== Muthill ==
Image	Title / subject	Location and coordinates	Date	Artist / designer	Type	Material	Dimensions	Designation	Wikidata	Notes
	War memorial	Muthill	1921	Charles T. Ewing of Crieff	Celtic wheel cross on plinth	Granite				
	Jupiter	Drummond Castle, Muthill Parish			Statue	Marble		Category B		Among 50 sculptures in the grounds and gardens of Drummond Castle

== Perth ==
Image	Title / subject	Location and coordinates	Date	Artist / designer	Type	Material	Dimensions	Designation	Wikidata	Notes
More images	Perth mercat cross	Perth			Pillar cross on pedestal	Stone			Q110244184	
	Sir Walter Scott	South Inch, Perth	1845	Cochrane Brothers	Statue on pedestal	Stone		Category C		
	Statue of Albert, Prince Consort	North Inch, Perth	1864	William Brodie	Statue	Stone		Category B	Q17849204	
More images	Fair Maid of Perth	High Street, Perth	1992	Graham Ibbeson	Seated statue	Bronze				
More images	Nae Day Sae Dark	High Street, Perth	1992	David Annand	Statue group	Bronze and steel				Sculpture inspired by a William Soutar poem, which is engraved on the sculpture's steel circle
	Vortex	Bellwood Park, Perth	1994	Malcolm Robertson	Abstract sculpture	Metal				
	Millais Viewpoint	Perth	1997	Tim Shutter	3 part sculpture	Sandstone				
	River Tay Themes	North Inch, Perth	1999	David Wilson	2 Gates and pillars	Bronze and stone				

== Pitlochry ==
Image	Title / subject	Location and coordinates	Date	Artist / designer	Type	Material	Dimensions	Designation	Wikidata	Notes
More images	War memorial	Institute Park, Pitlochry	1922		Celtic cross on pedestal	Granite		Category C	Q77774504	

== Scone ==
Image	Title / subject	Location and coordinates	Date	Artist / designer	Type	Material	Dimensions	Designation	Wikidata	Notes
	War memorial	Junction of Perth Road & Mayfield Terrace, Scone	1920	George Christie of Perth	Cross	Stone				
