= Ta-Kr-Hb =

Female mummy

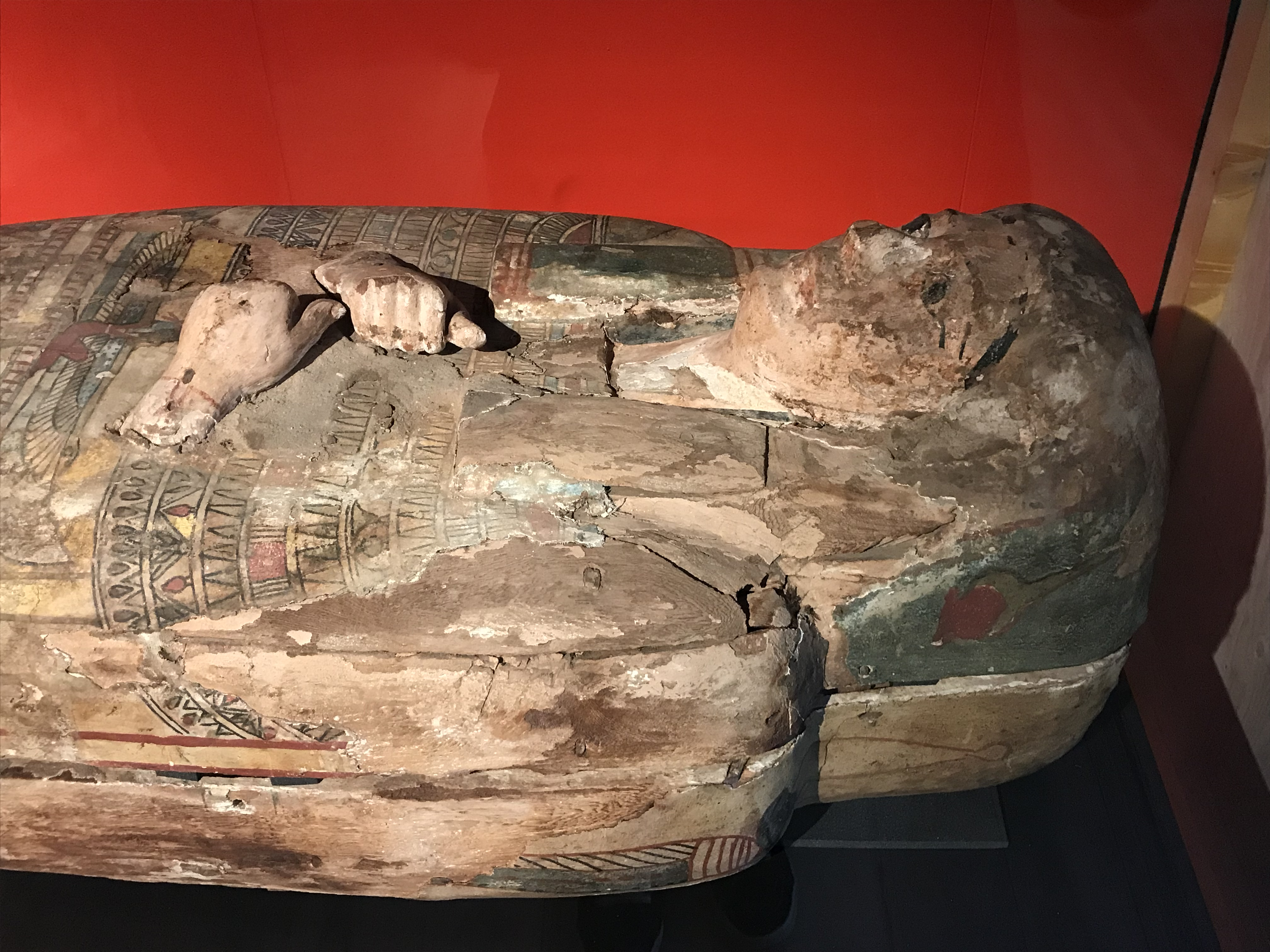
The coffin of Ta-Kr-Hb at Perth Museum

Ta-Kr-Hb is a female mummy who was donated to the Perth Museum and Art Gallery in Scotland in 1936, believed to be the remains of a priestess of Thebes. The remains are estimated to be up to 2,700 or around 3000 years old. The name of the mummy 'Ta-Kr-Hb' (pronounced 'Takherheb') and her status as a princess were revealed by the hieroglyphs on the lid of her coffin.

== Biography ==
Research by the University of Manchester has revealed that Ta-Kr-Hb was female, and around 35 or more years old when she died, with poor dental health. A 2023 facial reconstruction was carried out by Dr Christopher Rynn, who assessed the skull of Ta-Kr-Hb to be more likely of Kushite ancestry, by contrast to other Ancient Egyptian skulls from his earlier casework, which were from much earlier than the 26th Dynasty.

The hieroglyphs on her coffin lid indicate that she was a high-status priestess of Thebes, or the Egyptian town of Akhmim.

== Condition of mummy ==
In 2013, the same study conducted by the University of Manchester suggested that the mummy could be up to 2,700 years old. An examination of the mummy at the Royal Manchester Children's Hospital revealed that Ta-Kr-Hb's chest and pelvis had been damaged post mummification. Imaging techniques showed that the bones in her chest and abdomen were broken and dislocated. The mummy's fragile state has been attributed to grave robbers. A JustGiving campaign was launched by the Perth and Kinross museum's trust in order to raise money to help fund the work needed to prevent the mummy's deterioration. By 2020 the campaign had raised £1,307.

== The coffin ==
The researchers at the University of Manchester found that the coffin was likely to have been made in the town of Akhmim during the 25th-26th dynasty, dating it around 760 BC to 525 BC. In 2020, Scottish conservators discovered paintings on the upper and lower side of the base of Ta-Kr-Hb's coffin trough for the first time. The Collections Officer at the Perth Museum and Art Gallery Dr Mark Hall told the Scotsman, "We had never had a reason to lift the whole thing so high that we could see the underneath of the trough and had never lifted the mummy out before and didn't expect to see anything there." The paintings on the coffin depict the Egyptian goddess Imentet or Amentet, the goddess of the dead. On the coffin, Imentet is shown standing on a platform, wearing a red dress which shows that she is of divine nature or a goddess. The coffin is almost entirely intact other than some damage to its footboard.

== Ownership and exhibition history ==
The remains of Ta-Kr-Hb were bought by William Bailey from a curator at a museum in Cairo, and were donated by Bailey to the Alloa Society of Natural Science and Archaeology in 1896. In 1936, both the mummy and coffin were donated to the Perth Museum, where the mummy resides today, in the Foreign Archaeology Collection. The remains were exhibited at the Perth Museum until 1970s, when it was decided that they were too fragile to continue being displayed.

== Present day significance ==
The mummy is one of the highlights of the Perth Museum, and remains popular with local visitors.
