= Portrait of Effie Millais =

Painting by John Everett Millais

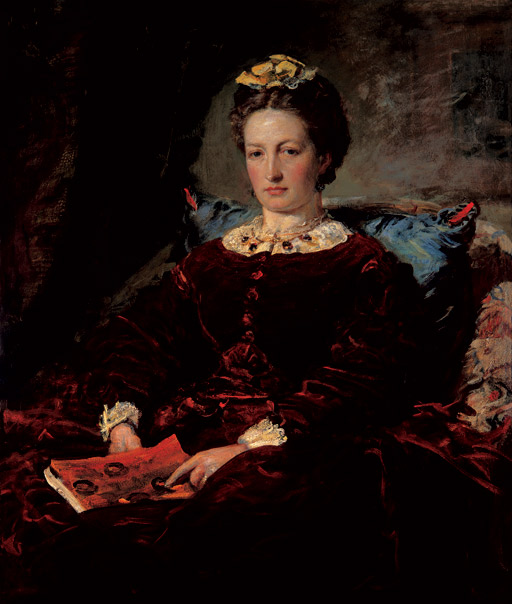
- Artist: John Everett Millais
- Year: 1873
- Type: Oil on canvas, portrait painting
- Dimensions: 99 cm × 84 cm (39 in × 33 in)
- Location: Perth Art Gallery; Perthshire

Portrait of Effie Millais is an 1873 portrait painting by the British artist John Everett Millais. It depicts his wife Effie Gray seated, holding a copy of The Cornhill Magazine.

Effie Gray was from the Scottish city of Perth and in her youth had modelled for Millais. She had hen married the art critic John Ruskin, a champion of Millais and the Pre-Raphaelites, only to have their marriage annulled in 1854. She married Millais the following year. The couple had eight children together and this portrait depicts her as an elegant matriarch. The grandeur emphasis the social status of the couple in Victorian England. By this stage she effectively managed his career.

The picture is now in the Perth Art Gallery, having been acquired in 1977.

== See also ==
- List of paintings by John Everett Millais

== Bibliography ==
- Barlow, Paul. Time Present and Time Past: The Art of John Everett Millais. Routledge, 2017.
- Jiminez, Jill Berk. Dictionary of Artists' Models. Taylor & Francis, 2013.
