= Willi Reiland =

- Reiland pictured around 2010
- Born: 2 November 1933; Trutnov, Czechoslovakia
- Died: 14 November 2015 (aged 82); Haibach, Germany
- Resting place: Old Town Cemetery, Aschaffenburg, Germany
- Occupation: Lord Mayor
- Spouse: Eliva Hattig (1962–2015; his death)
- Children: 2

Willi Reiland (2 November 1933 – 14 November 2015) was a German politician. He was lord mayor of the Lower Franconian town of Aschaffenburg in Bavaria, Germany, for thirty years.

== Early life and career ==
In 1946, when Reiland was aged twelve, he and his family were expelled out of Czechoslovakia. They moved to Haibach in Lower Franconia, Germany.

He attended secondary school in Aschaffenburg, then studied law in Würzburg, receiving his doctorate in 1960.

In 1962, he was elected member of the Bavarian State Parliament. He remained in the role until 1970, when he was made lord mayor of Aschaffenburg. He remained in that role for thirty years, retiring in April 2000.

== Personal life ==
In 1962, Reiland married Elvira Hattig, with whom he had two sons.

In 1977, the couple were presented to the Queen Elizabeth II and Prince Philip, Duke of Edinburgh, during a visit to Perth, Scotland, a twin town of Aschaffenburg. Eleven years later, Reiland opened Perth's St John's Shopping Centre.

== Death ==
Reiland died in 2015, aged 82. He was interred in an honorary grave in Aschaffenburg's Old Town Cemetery.
