= Georgina Ballantine =

Scottish nurse, registrar and salmon fisher

- Born: 25 November 1889; Caputh, Perth and Kinross, Scotland
- Died: 12 April 1970 (aged 80); Caputh, Perth and Kinross, Scotland
- Known for: Landed a 64-pound (29 kg) salmon on the River Tay, the largest recorded from a British river with rod and line

Georgina Ballantine (25 November 1889 – 12 April 1970) was a Scottish nurse, registrar and salmon fisher. In 1922, Ballantine landed a 64lb (29kg) salmon on the River Tay, the largest recorded from a British river with rod and line.

== Early life ==
Georgina Ballantine was born on 25 November 1889, in Caputh, Perth and Kinross, Scotland. Her mother was Christina White and her father was James Ballantine, a registrar and ghillie.

== Career ==
Ballantine worked as a Voluntary Aid Detachment nurse from 1914 to 1919, in Perth, London and Bapaume, France. It was in France that she was decorated by the Red Cross. She later worked as registrar in Caputh.

== Record landing of the Great Tay Salmon ==
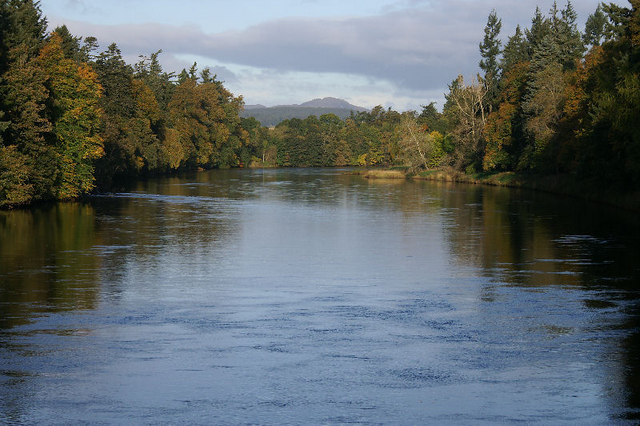
Ballantine caught her salmon beside the River Tay

On 7 October 1922, Ballantine was fishing with her father on Glendelvine Water, a salmon fishing pool on the River Tay. Following a two-hour struggle, she landed a 64-pound (29 kg) salmon, the largest recorded taken from a British river with rod and line, half Ballantine's own weight. The salmon, known as the Great Tay Salmon, was 54 inches (140 cm) in length and 28.5 inches (72 cm) in girth.

Her record was unchallenged until 2007, when another female angler, Bev Street, broke the record for largest caught freshwater fish by landing a 66lb catfish at Bluebell Lakes in Peterborough. Ballantine retains the record for the largest rod caught salmon.

A watercolour painting by A. J. Rennie depicting the fish hung in the dining room of the Flyfishers Club in London, despite the fact that Ballantine, as a woman, would not be admitted to the gentlemen's club.

Ballantine's salmon was donated to Perth Royal Infirmary, and a cast was donated to the Pall Mall angling emporium. A model is exhibited in a display in Perth Museum with a commentary in the voice of Ballantine.

== Later life and death ==
In her later life, Ballantine experienced severe arthritis in both legs, and as a result they were both amputated. Ballantine died in 1970, aged 80, in Caputh.
