= Strathmore meteorite =

Meteorite landed in Perthshire in 1917

Strathmore
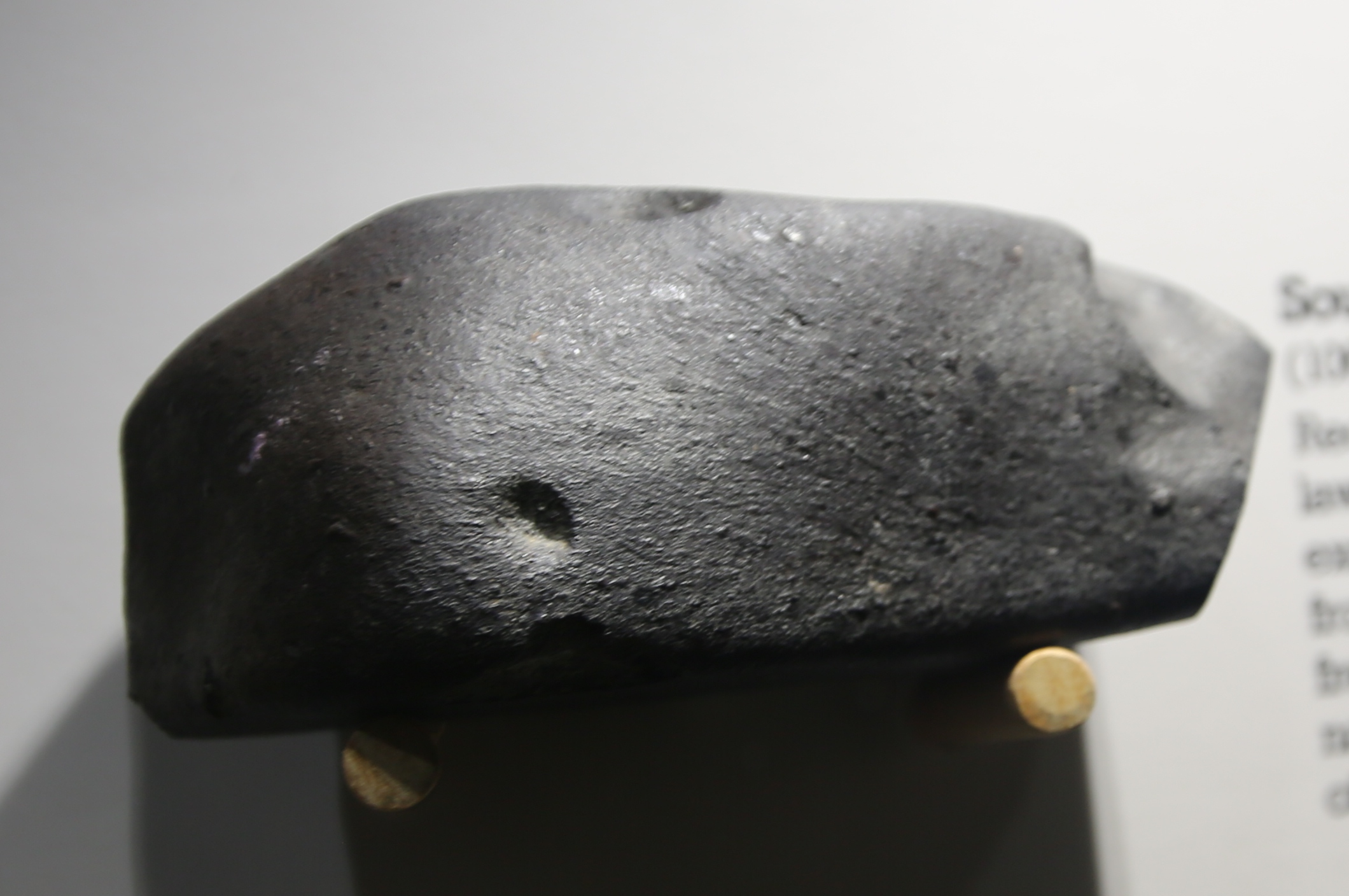
- South Corston fragment of the meteorite
- Country: Scotland
- Region: Perth and Kinross
- Coordinates: 56°35′N 3°15′W
- Observed fall: Yes
- Fall date: 3 December 1917 (108 years ago)
- TKW: 13.4 kilograms (30 lb)
- Related media on Wikimedia Commons

The Strathmore meteorite landed in the Strathmore area of Perthshire on 3 December 1917. It was reported to have been in four fragments, subsequently named Essendy, Carsie, Keithick and South Corston. The meteorite is estimated to be 4.5 billion years old.

The South Corston fragment of the meteorite is in the care of Perth Museum and Art Gallery.

== See also ==
- Glossary of meteoritics
- Meteorite find
