= Perth City Hall =

City hall in Perth, Perth and Kinross, Scotland

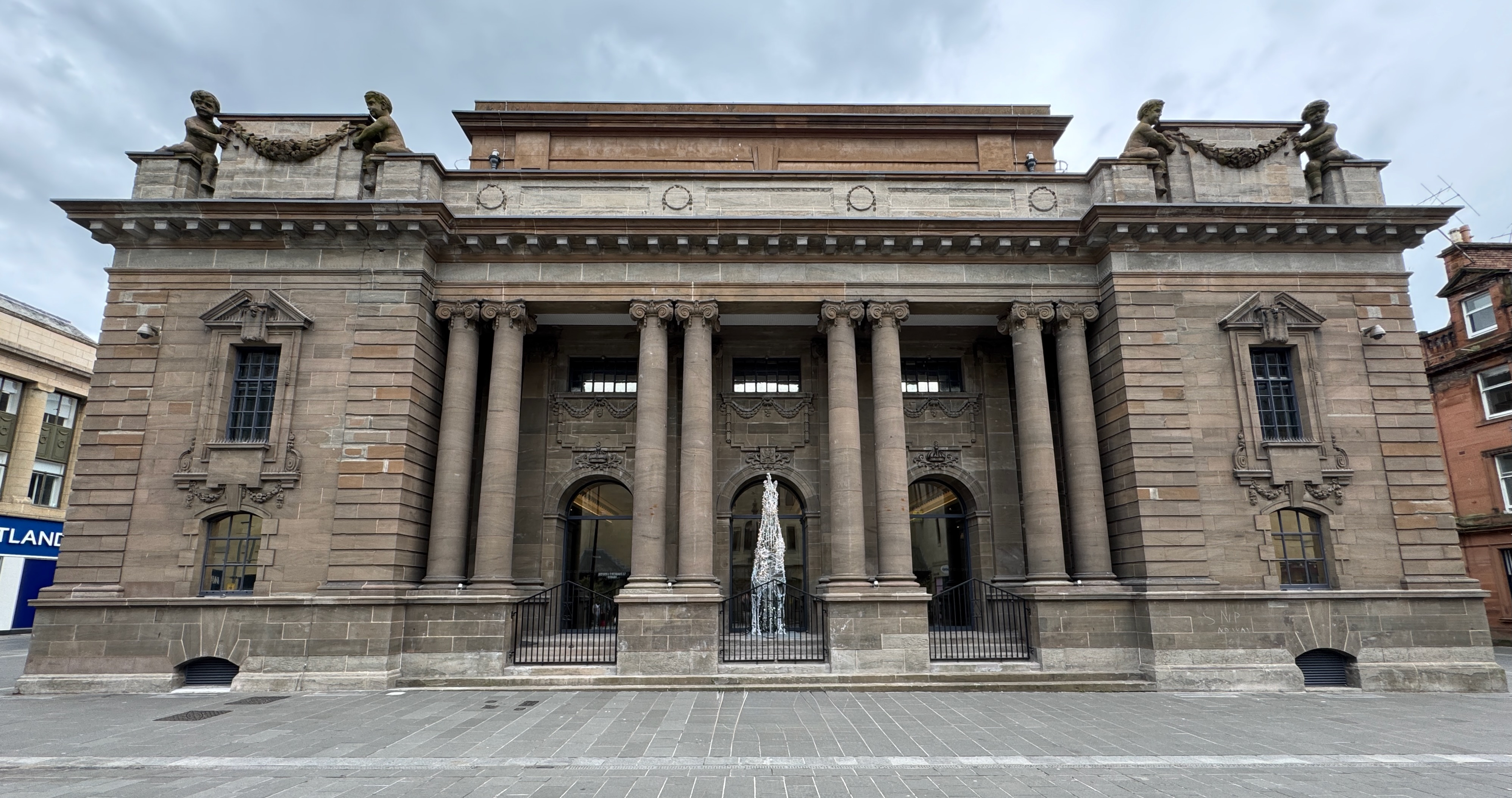
- Main entrance, pictured in 2024, looking east

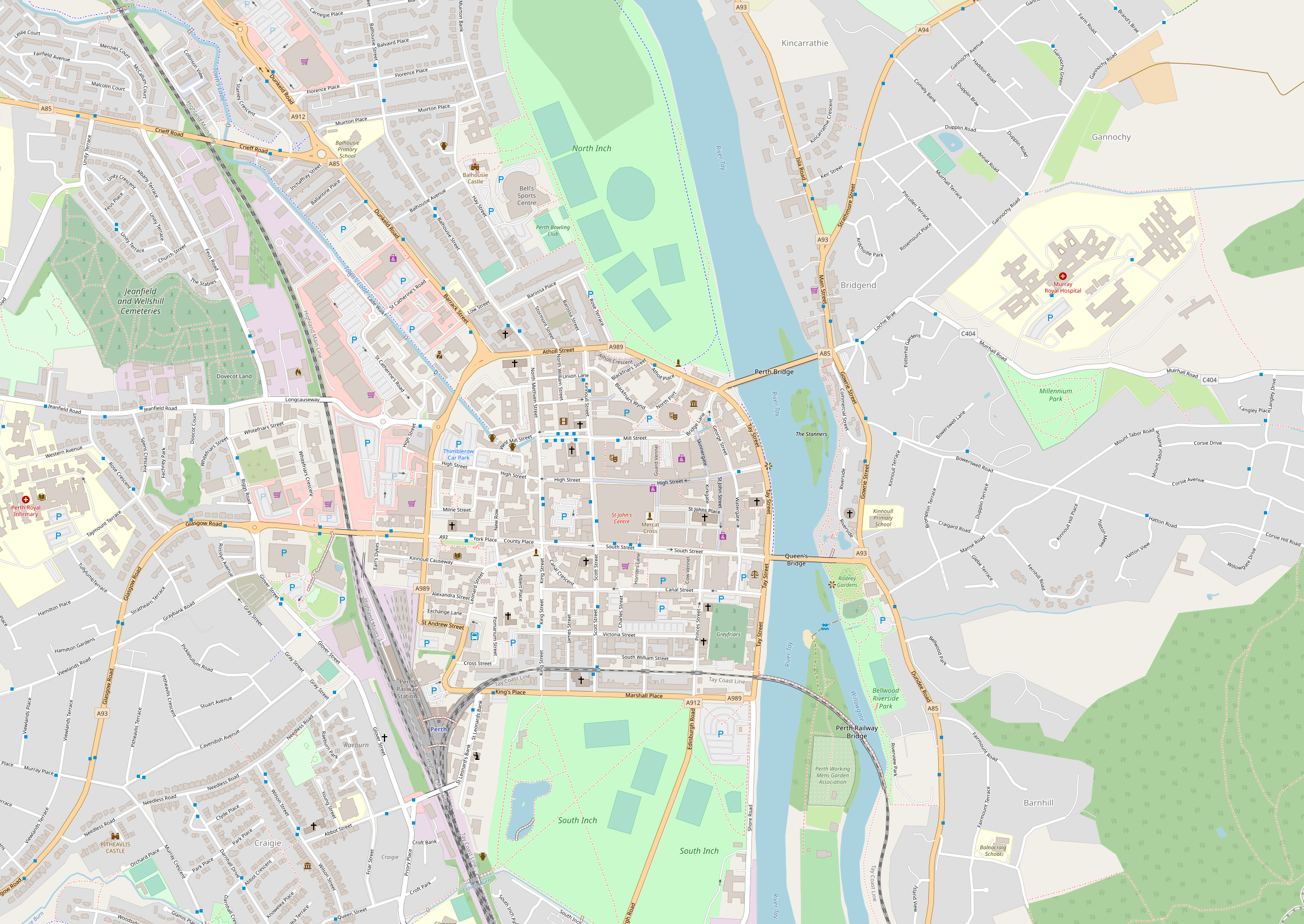
- Shown in Perth
- 56.3959°N 3.4294°W
- Location: Perth

History
- Built: 1914 (112 years ago)

Site notes
- Architect(s): Henry Edward Clifford and Thomas Melville Lunan
- Architectural style: Classical style

Listed Building – Category B
- Designated: 26 August 1977
- Reference no.: LB39318

Perth City Hall is a civic building in King Edward Street, Perth, Scotland. Built in 1914, it is a Category B listed building.

The building served as a music hall before closing in 2005 and being replaced by Perth Concert Hall. Major renovations began in 2018 which included the introduction of a museum in part of the building.

It reopened on 30 March 2024 as the new home of Perth Museum, with the Stone of Destiny as one of the flagship items on display.

== History ==
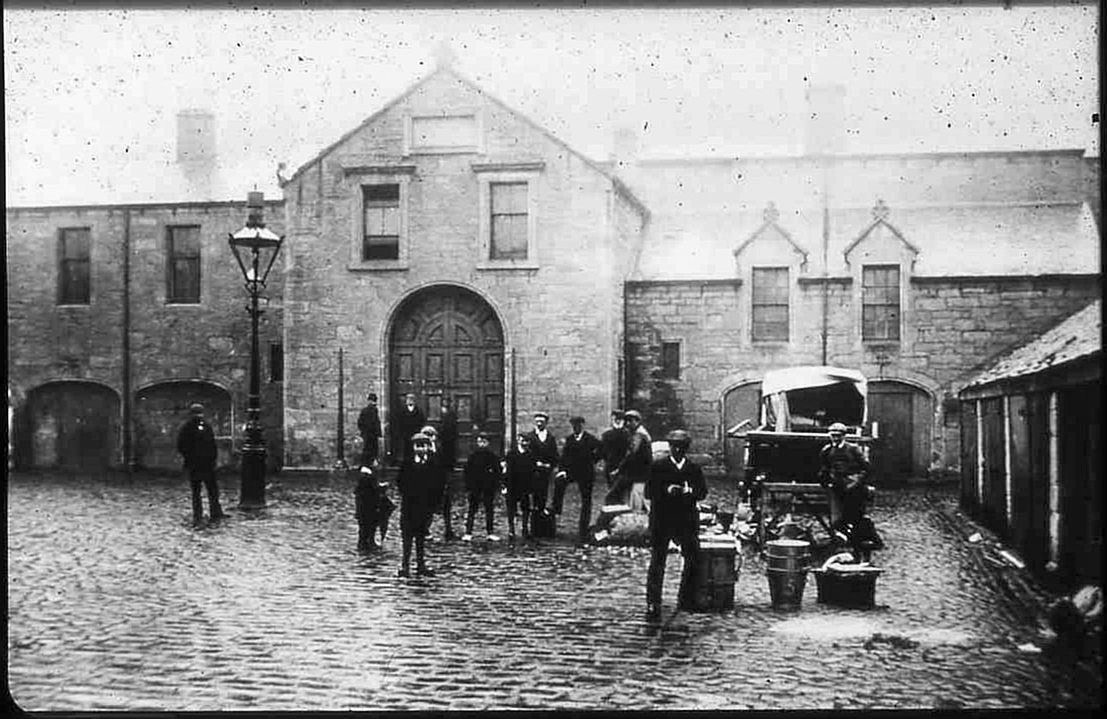
The original City Hall, pictured around 1870, looking west from St John's Kirk

A c. 1956 view of the streetscape around City Hall. This view to the east shows Meal Vennel and King Edward Street prior to the construction of St John's Square. Meal Vennel and St John's Square were replaced by St John's Shopping Centre

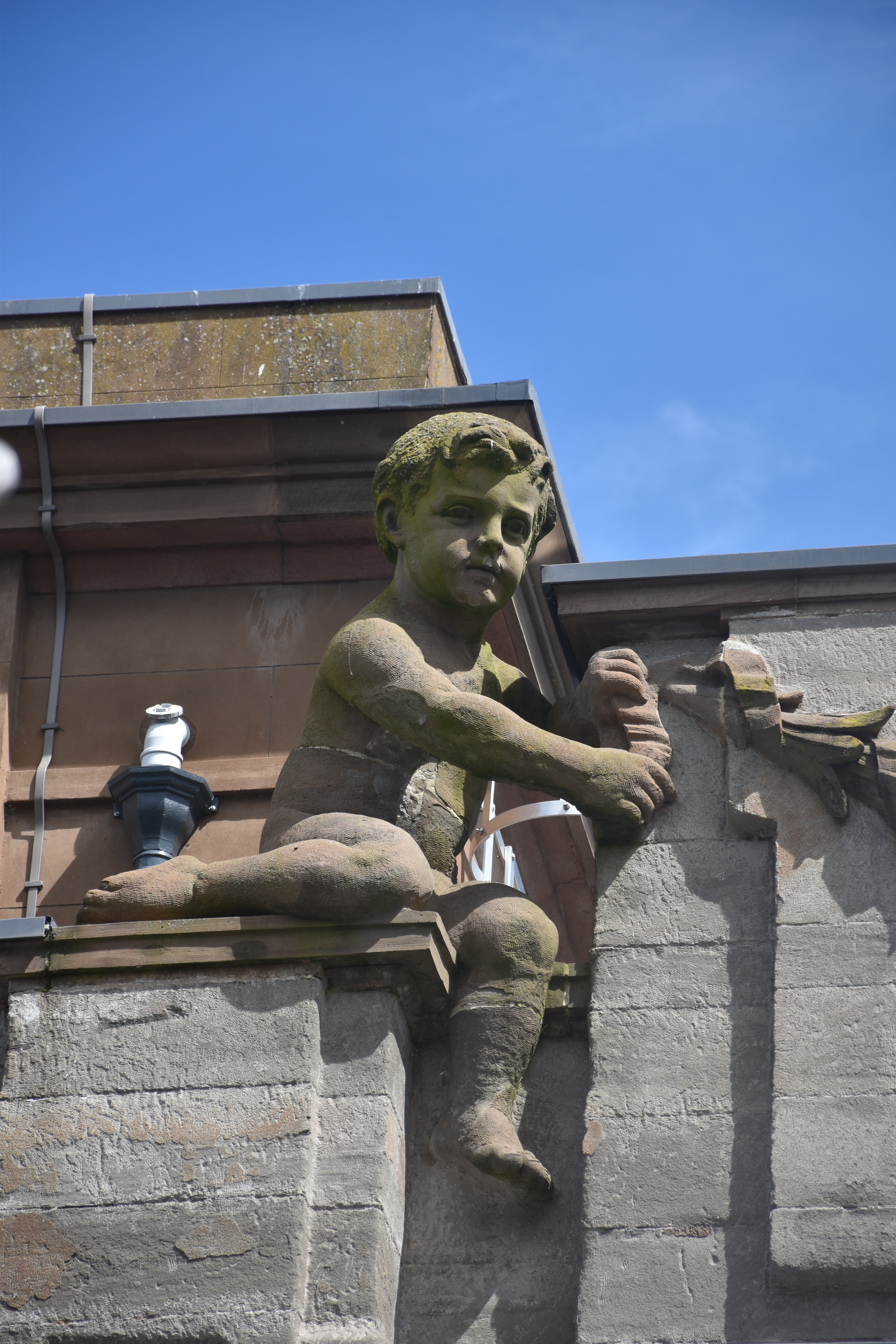
Putto holding a garland (circa 1914), right side bay, King Edward Street façade

In the mid-19th century the administrative centre of the town was the old city chambers at the east end of the High Street. (Note: The old city chambers were replaced by the Municipal Buildings also at the east end of the High Street in 1881.) However, civic leaders needed a public hall in which to hold concerts and other public events and the first city hall, designed by William Macdonald Mackenzie, was built on the site of the old flesh, butter and meal markets in what became King Edward Street in 1844. By the turn of the century the first city hall was in a very dilapidated state and, after a piece of plaster fell from the ceiling injuring several people, the building was demolished in 1908.

The foundation stone for the new building was laid by the Lord Provost, Councillor James Cuthbert, on 26 June 1909. It was designed by Harry Edward Clifford and Thomas Melville Lunan in the Classical style, built at a cost of £25,000 and officially opened by the Lord Justice General, Lord Dunedin, on 29 April 1911. The design involved a symmetrical main frontage with five bays facing King Edward Street (a 180-degree change from the original building's orientation), which was laid out between 1901 and 1902; the central section of three bays featured a large portico with three round-headed doorways with windows above flanked by full-height Ionic order columns in pairs. Perth mercat cross was erected immediately to the west of City Hall in 1913, during the building's reconstruction.

Margaret Thatcher addressed the Scottish Conservative Party conference in the hall, just a week after becoming Prime Minister, in May 1979.

Beyond the mercat cross, the main entrance of St John's Centre was built facing City Hall: St John's Square was demolished in 1987 to make way for its construction.

Perth City Hall hosted concerts from a number of high-profile performers throughout its history, including The Who in 1965 and The Spencer Davis Group in 1966 through to Morrissey as late as September 2004.

Following the opening of the Perth Concert Hall in 2005, the city hall became vacant and was placed on the Buildings at Risk Register for Scotland.

In May 2012 Perth and Kinross Council submitted a proposal to demolish the hall and redevelop the site but this was rejected by Historic Scotland. The council then sought architectural proposals for the re-design of the existing building and the short-listed proposals were put on display in June 2017.

== Perth Museum ==
In January 2019, BAM Construction began work on a £30 million programme of works to convert the city hall into a new heritage and arts attraction based on a design by Mecanoo. The new attraction will incorporate displays on the Stone of Destiny and the Kingdom of Alba.

In December 2020, the Scottish Government announced that the Stone of Destiny would be relocated to the hall by 2024.

A competition to name the building's forthcoming museum section was launched in March 2022, with the winning name being "Perth Museum", with 60% of the votes.

The building reopened on 30 March 2024 as the Perth Museum, with the Stone of Destiny and the Carpow Logboat as two of the flagship items on display.

== See also ==
- List of listed buildings in Perth, Scotland
- Perth Art Gallery, former home to Perth Museum
