= St John's Shopping Centre, Perth =

St John's Shopping Centre

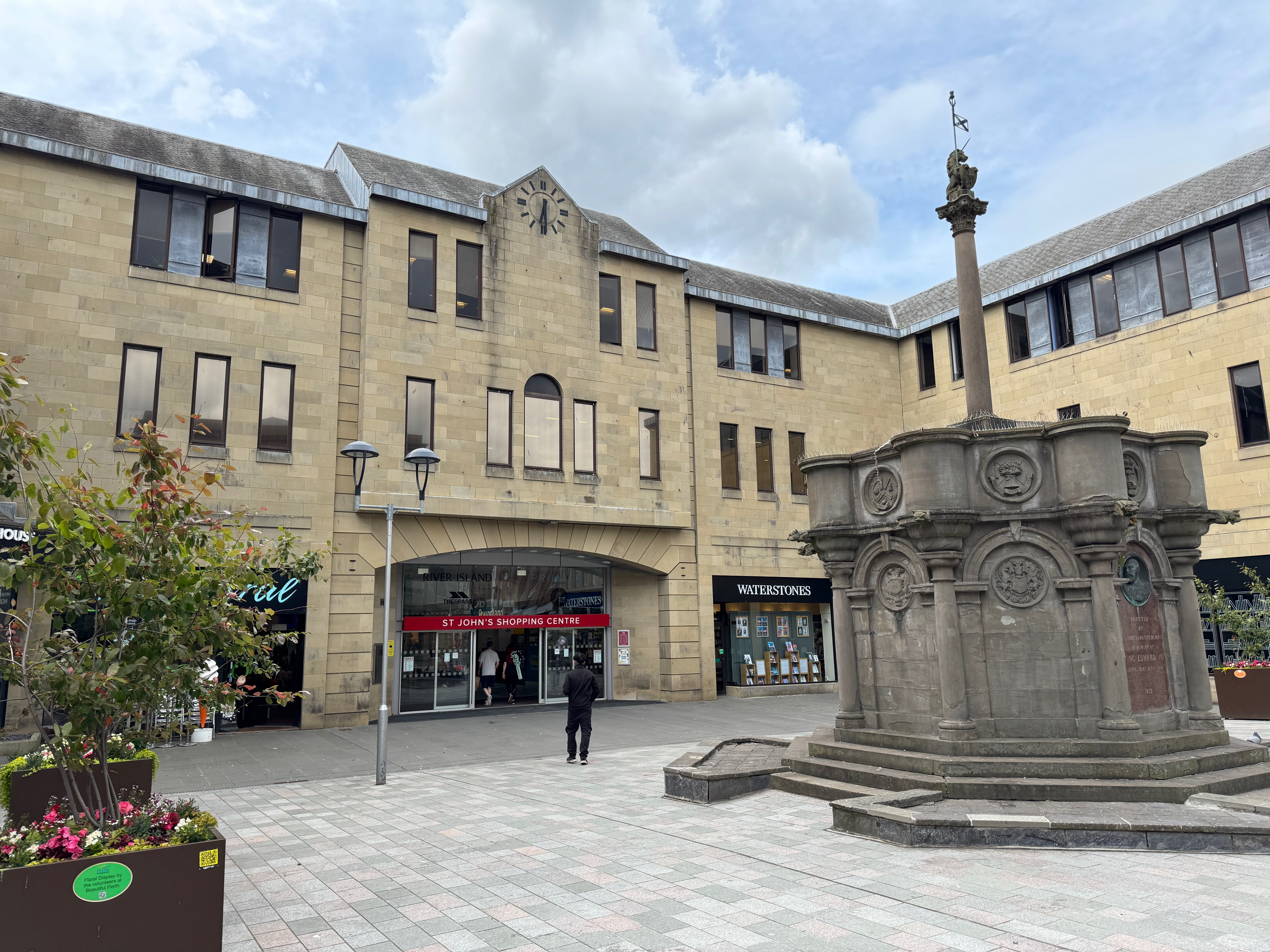
- The King Edward Street main entrance and Perth mercat cross
- Location: Perth, Perth and Kinross, Scotland
- Coordinates: 56°23′46″N 3°25′52″W
- Address: King Edward Street
- Opened: 1988 (38 years ago)
- Owner: Universities Superannuation Scheme (since 2011)
- Num. of stores: 28
- Floor area: 145,000 sq ft (13,471 m^{2})
- Floors: 3
- Website: www.stjshopping.co.uk

St John's Shopping Centre is a shopping mall in Perth, Scotland. Situated between (and with entrances from) South Street (to the south), King Edward Street (to the east), Scott Street (to the west) and the pedestrianised section of the High Street (to the north), it was built between 1985 and 1987. It cost around £20 million. Its main entrance is that facing the Category B listed Perth City Hall on King Edward Street, with Perth mercat cross standing between the two.

Its construction meant the ancient St John's Square was demolished, with its residents relocated elsewhere in the city. The Session House also previously stood in the market place, immediately across from the western door of St John's Kirk, on the site of today's City Hall.

The shopping centre was opened in March 1988 by Dr Willi Reiland, mayor for thirty years of Perth's twin town, Aschaffenburg, Germany.

The centre was once owned by Gerald Grosvenor, 6th Duke of Westminster. It was purchased by the Universities Superannuation Scheme from BAE Systems Pension Funds in 2011.

Late-19th-century view of the now-demolished Session House, looking east to St John's Kirk

A c. 1950 view, looking north, showing the buildings demolished to make way for the shopping centre, including (closest to the camera), the fire station

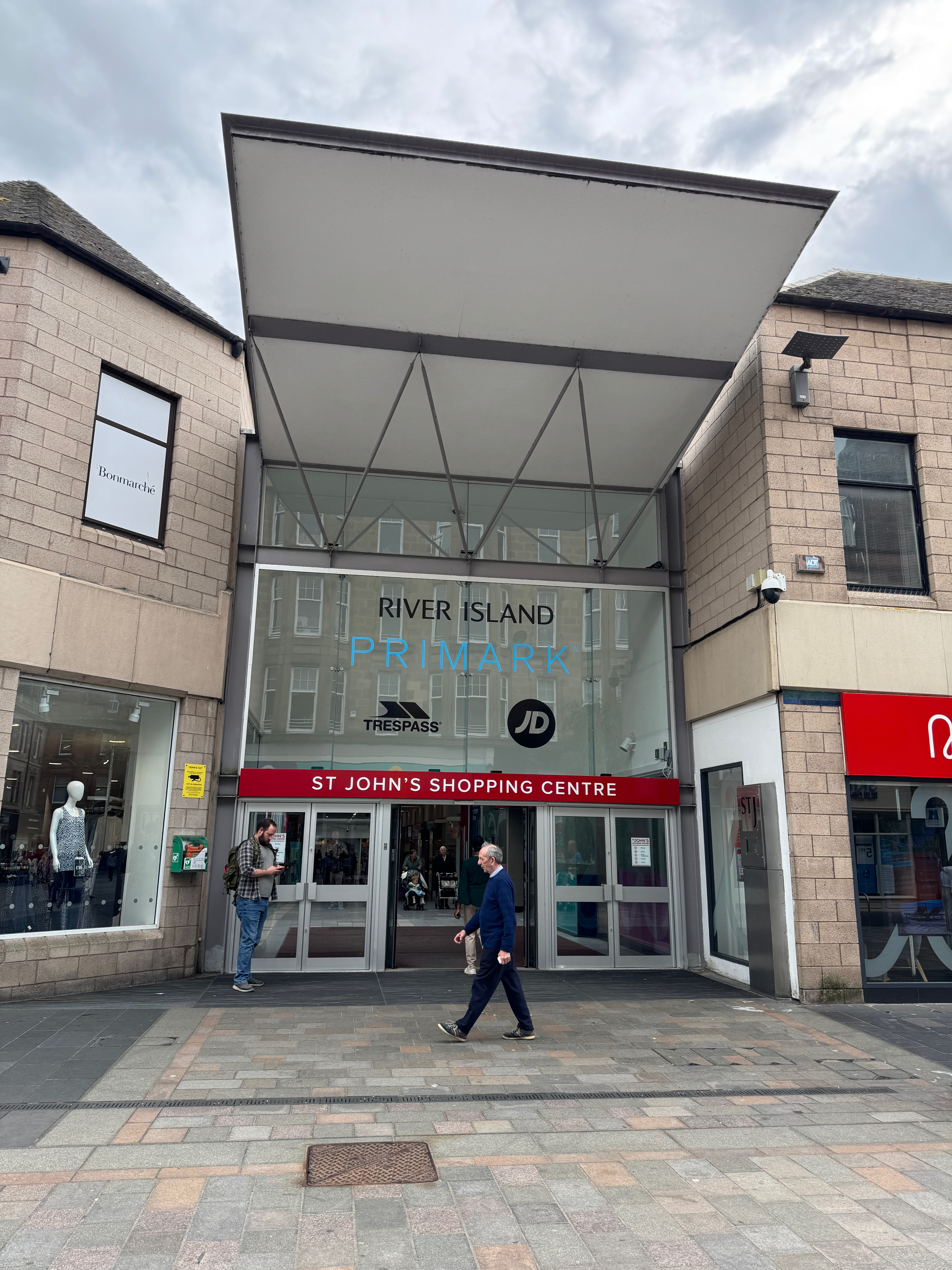
The High Street entrance

== Clock ==
When renovations were undertaken in 1997, the shopping centre's astronomical clock, which was part of the building at its 1988 opening and was a feature for many years thereafter, was moved to Perth Leisure Pool, where it was visible only from the top of the flume tower. It stopped working the following year, and was moved into storage. In 2019, there was a movement to bring the clock back. It features two characters who appear on the hour mark and tell the story of Sir Walter Scott's The Fair Maid of Perth.

The former St John's Centre clock
