= Perth mercat cross =

Scottish memorial cross

- Perth market cross
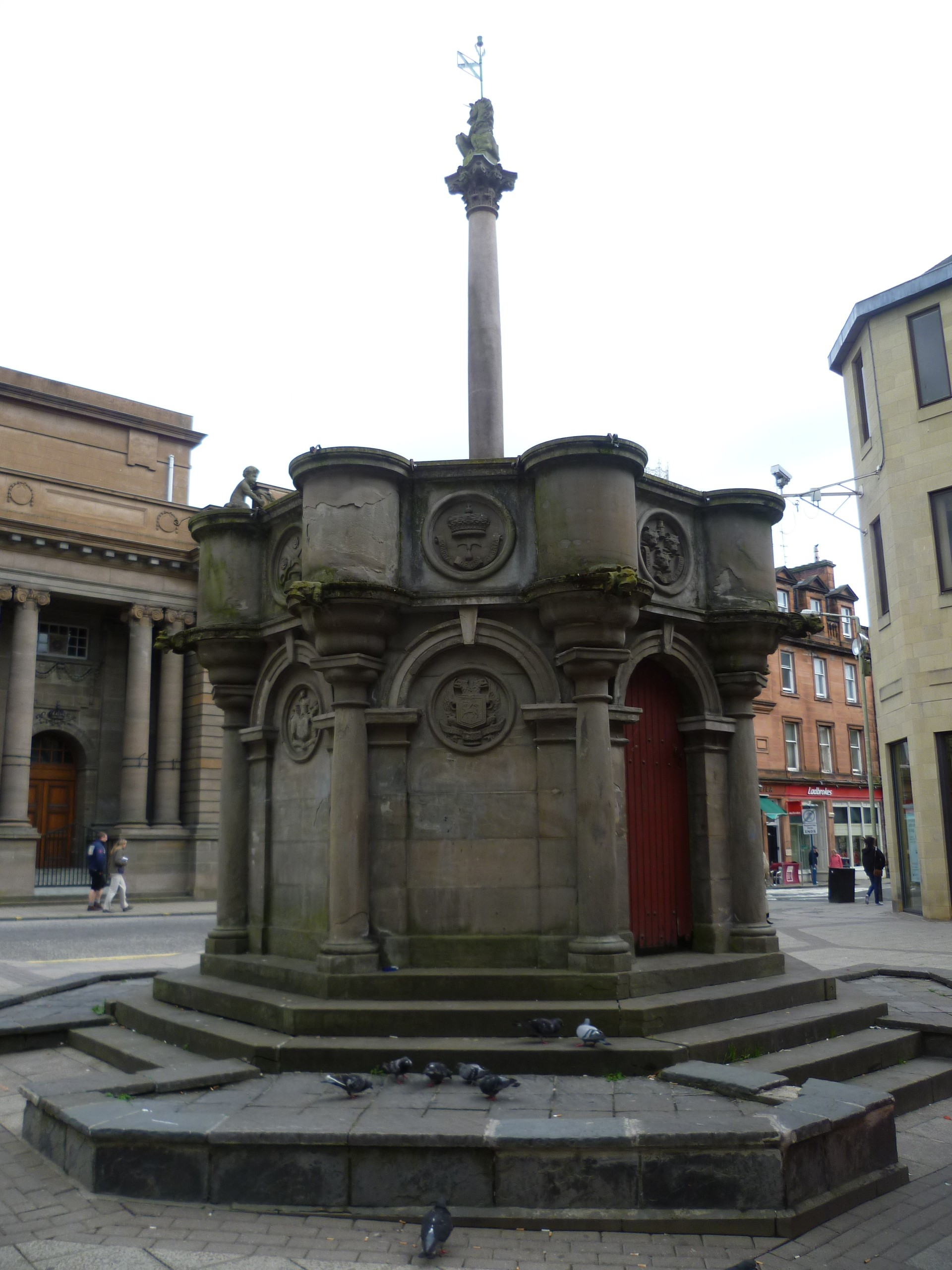
- The mercat cross in 2013, looking southeast towards King Edward Street. Perth City Hall is in view on the left

- Location within Perth and Kinross
- 56.39587°N 3.43026°W
- Location: King Edward Street, Perth, Perth and Kinross, Scotland

History
- Built: 1913 (113 years ago) (current version)

Perth mercat cross is located on King Edward Street in the Scottish city of Perth, Perth and Kinross. Erected in 1913, in memory of Edward VII, it stands immediately to the west of Perth City Hall, which was completed a year later, between it and St John's Centre. King Edward Street was created between 1901 and 1902. It is the fifth incarnation of the city's mercat crosses.

== Previous versions ==
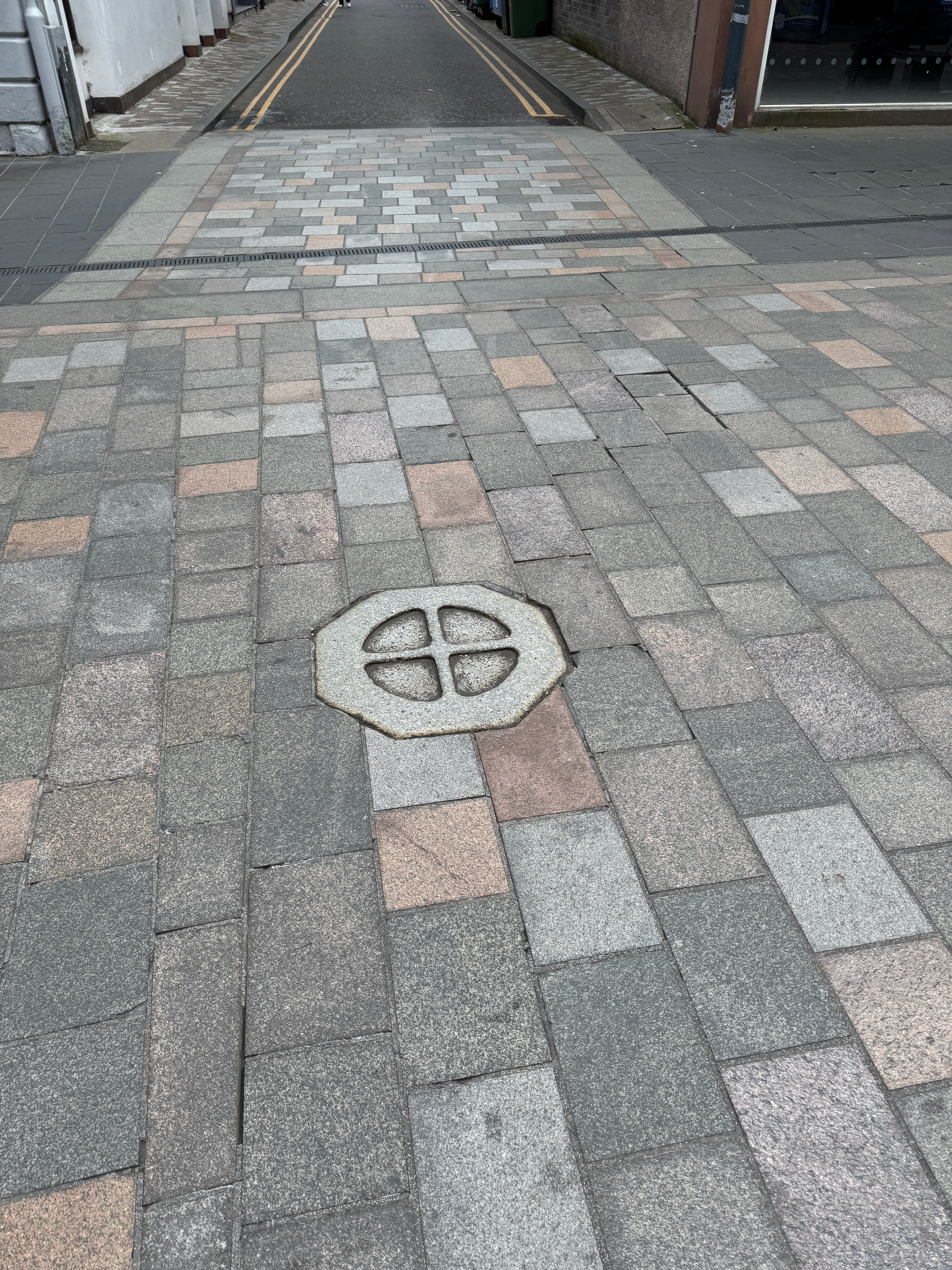
The site of the second mercat cross, on Perth's High Street

The site of the original mercat cross is not known.

The second of the crosses stood near The Old Ship Inn on Perth's High Street, between Kirkgate and Skinnergate, during the 17th century. It replaced the original one on the same spot. A special stone in today's pavement marks its former location. The cross was removed in 1651 by the engineers of Oliver Cromwell, during his occupation of the city, to provide material for his citadel at the northeastern corner of today's South Inch.

A third version of the cross was erected in 1669, after the restoration of Charles II. Since 1765, the top part of this cross, which was demolished, has stood in the grounds of Fingask Castle.

A fourth cross was the hub of the four routes of the Perth Corporation Tramways, but it was deemed to be an obstruction to street traffic, hence its removal.

The design of today's cross is closely based on the original.

== Design ==
The cross features the crests of thirteen town guilds, although none of them have any information attached to them.

== Gallery ==
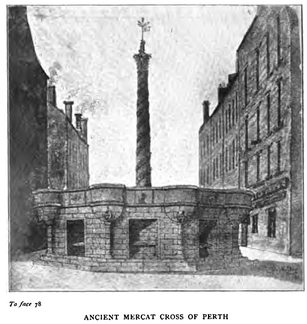
The second of the two crosses that stood on High Street, today marked with an inlay in the brick surface

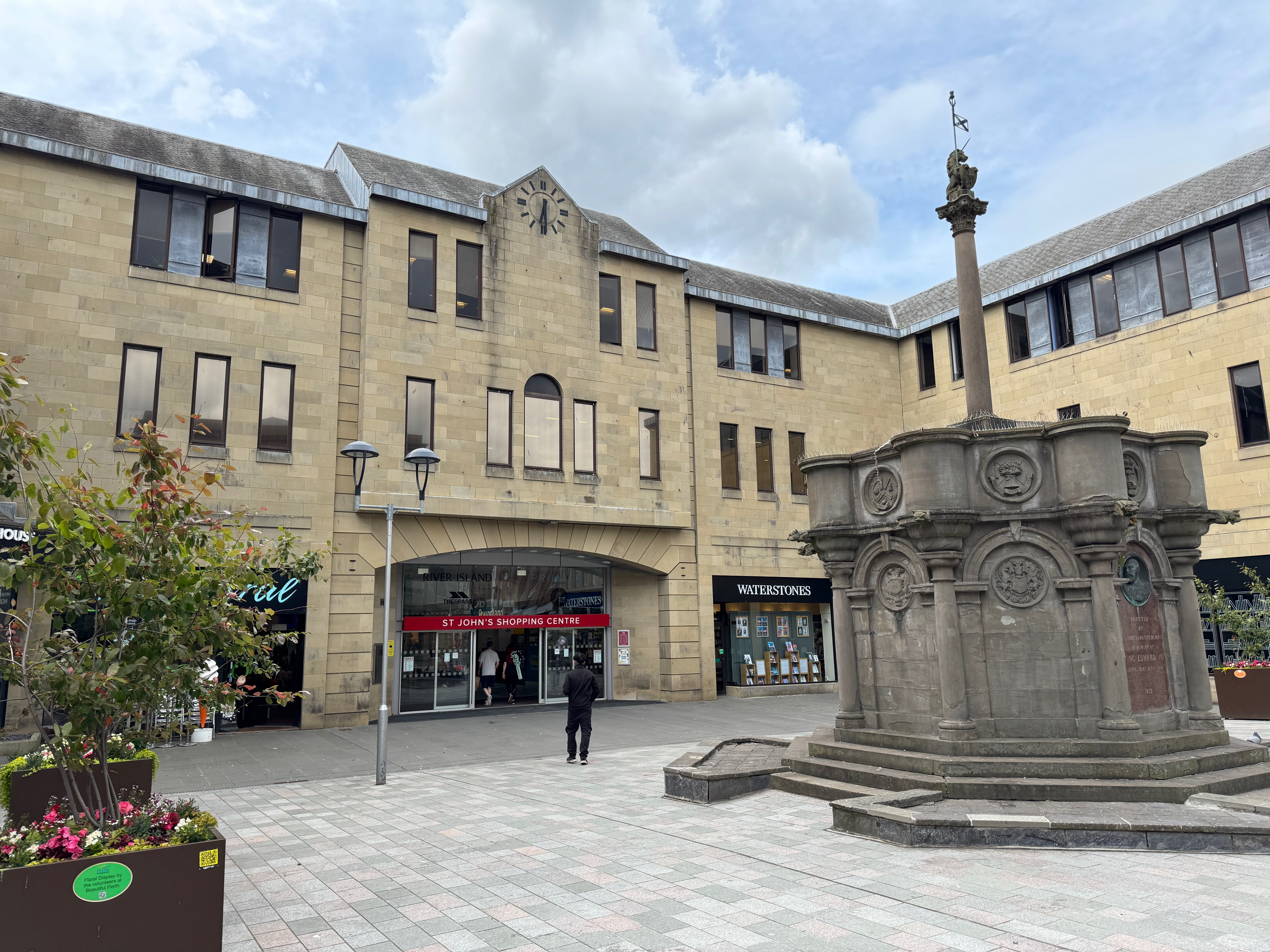
Looking northwest to St John's Centre

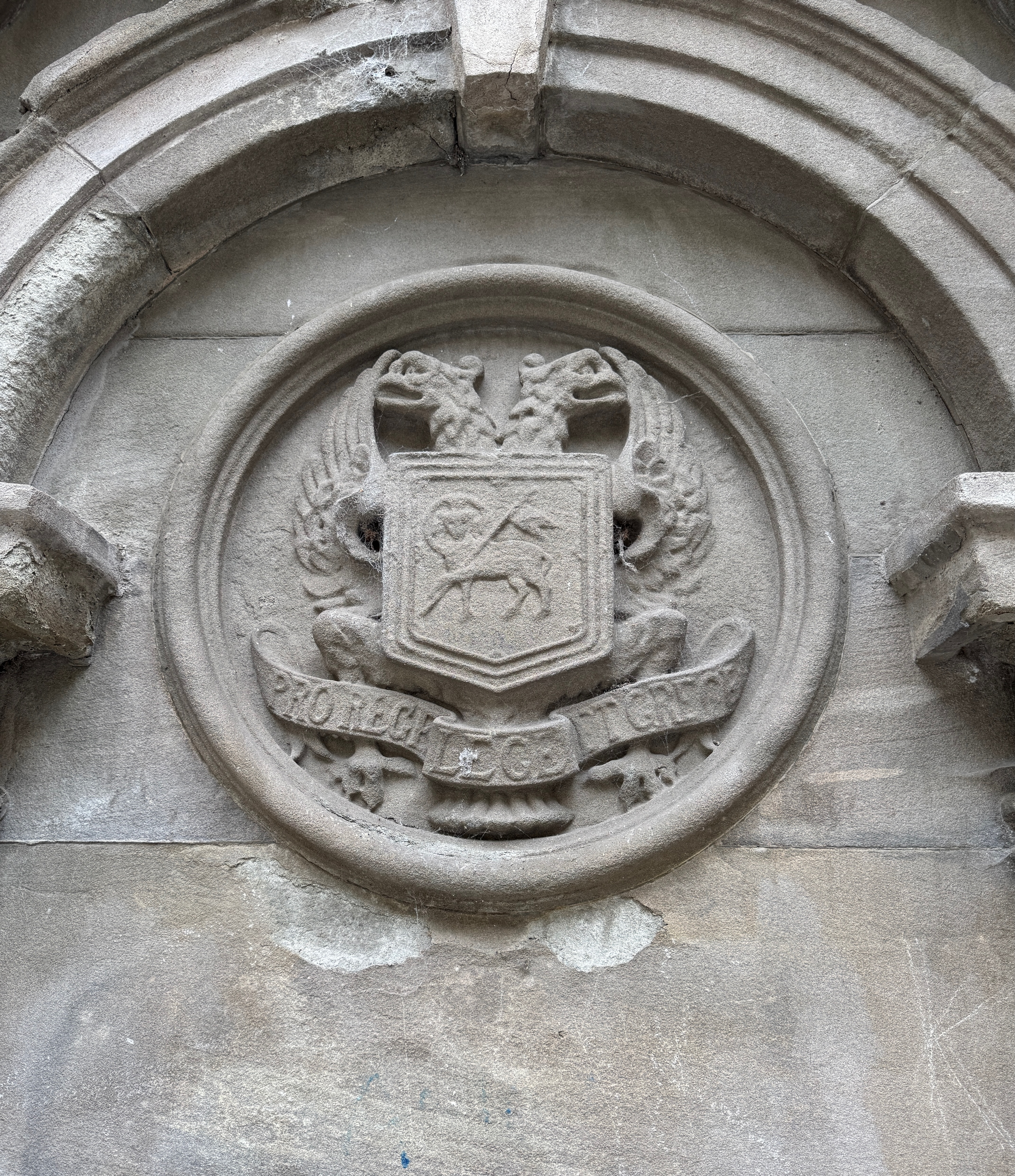
Carving detail

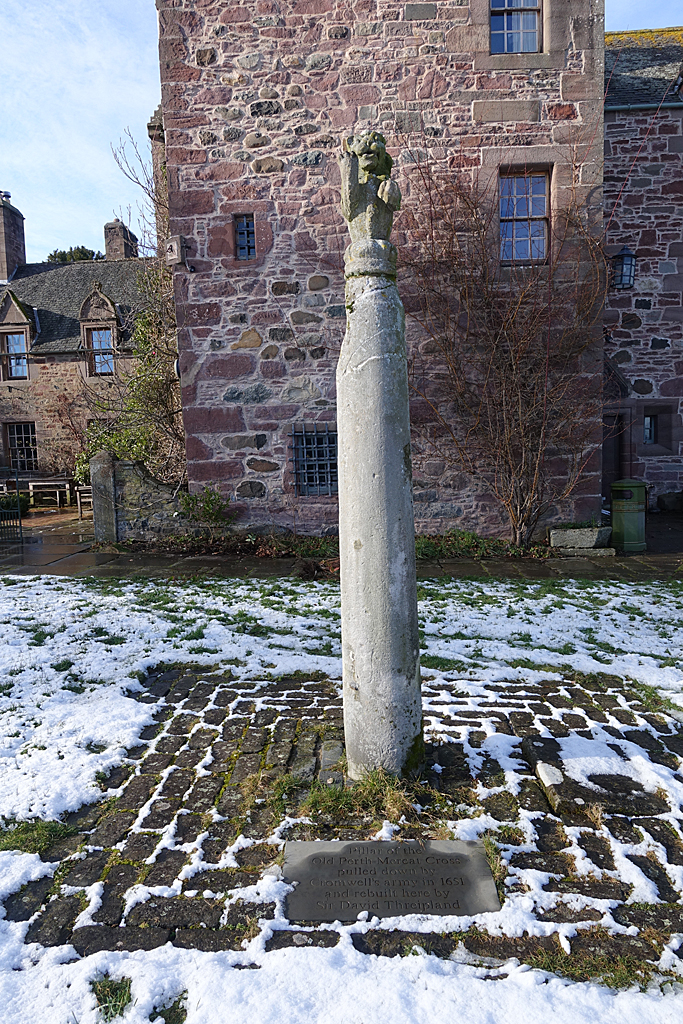
The top of a 17th-century incarnation of the cross, now located in the grounds of Fingask Castle

== See also ==
- Mercat cross
