= King Edward Street (Perth, Scotland) =

Prominent street in Perth, Scotland

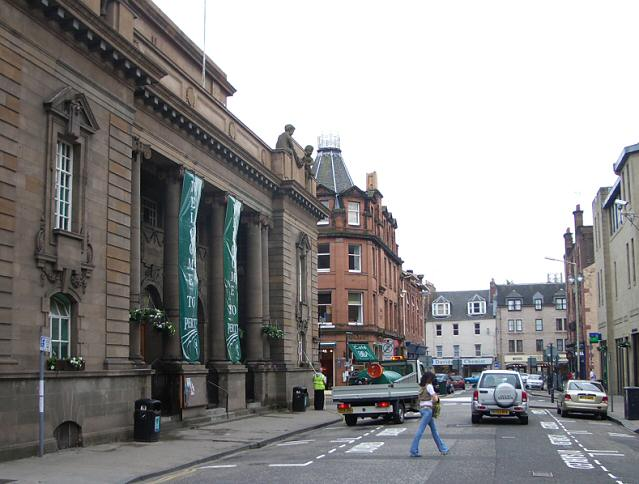
- King Edward Street in 2006, looking south
- Interactive map of King Edward Street
- Length: 0.097 mi (0.156 km)
- Location: Perth, Perth and Kinross, Scotland
- North end: High Street
- South end: South Street

Construction
- Completion: Early 20th century

King Edward Street is a street in the city of Perth, Scotland. Constructed in the early 20th century, it runs for about 510 feet (170 yd) between High Street to the north and South Street to the south. St John's Place and South St John's Place are the only junctions on King Edward Street.

Several notable buildings stand on King Edward Street, including Perth City Hall. The original city hall was constructed in 1844; it was replaced by today's structure in 1914. Prior to the 19th-century construction, what became King Edward Street was originally the home of the city's old flesh, butter and meal markets.

The rear (eastern side) of St John's Shopping Centre opens onto King Edward Street. Its construction in 1988 demolished St John's Square, with its residents relocated elsewhere in the city. The fifth incarnation of the Perth mercat cross stands to the east of the shopping centre. It was erected in 1913 in memory of Edward VII, who died three years earlier.

A £3-million pound project for the High Street and King Edward Street provided new seating, lighting and the laying of natural stone in 2010.

== Listed buildings and structures ==
- Perth City Hall (Category B listed)
- 2–8 King Edward Street (Category B listed)
- 22–26 King Edward Street (Category C listed)
- 30–36 King Edward Street (Category C listed)
