= Perth Art Gallery =

Art gallery in Perth, Scotland

Coordinates: 56.3983°N 3.4283°W

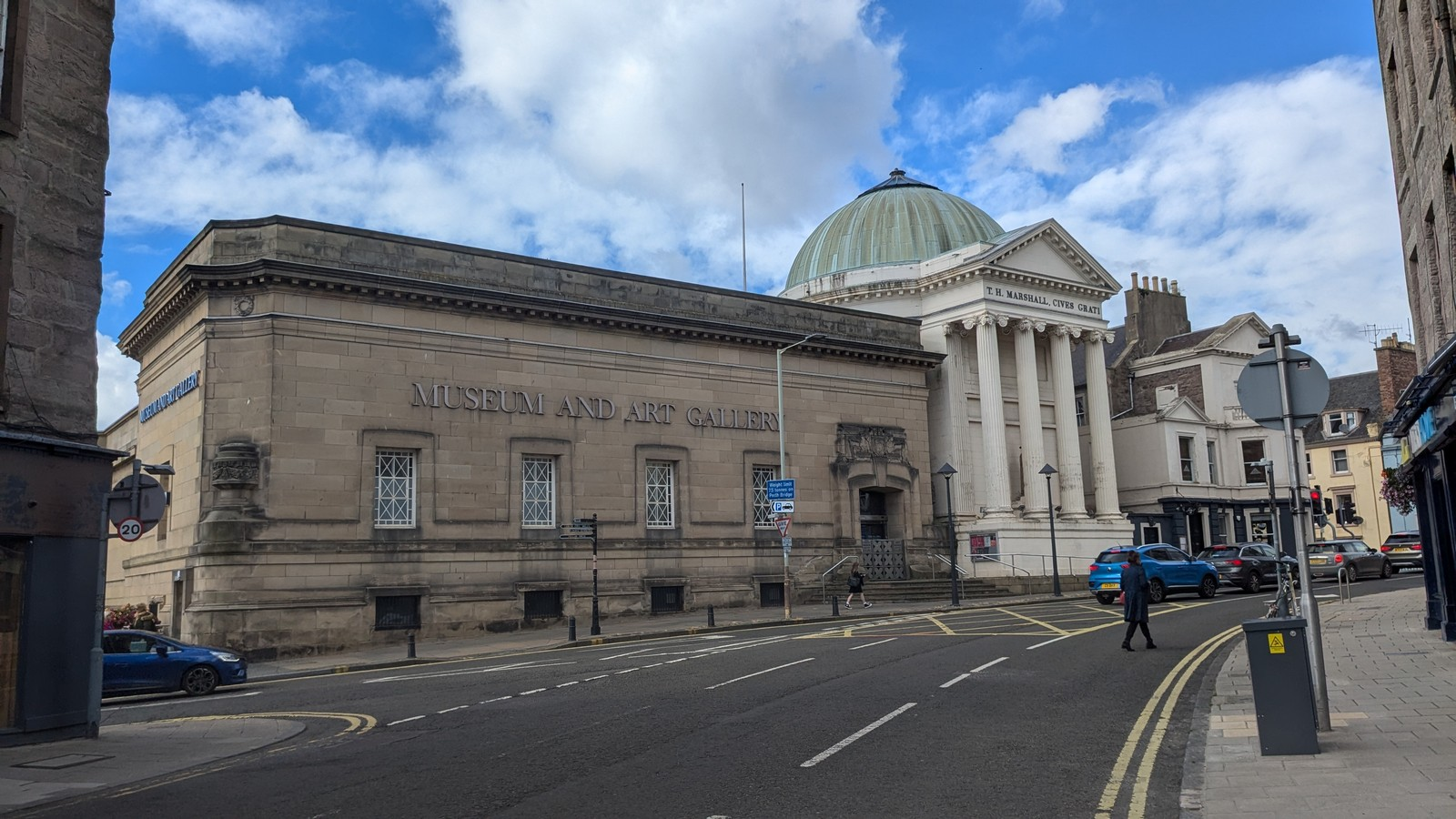
- Pictured in 2024
- Established: 1824 (202 years ago)
- Location: 78 George Street; Perth, Scotland
- Architect: David Morison

Perth Art Gallery is the principal art gallery and exhibition space in the city of Perth, Scotland. It is located partly in the Marshall Monument, named in memory of Thomas Hay Marshall, a former provost of Perth.

The building was formerly known as Perth Museum and Art Gallery, ceasing to be so in anticipation of the new Perth Museum opening within Perth City Hall.

== History ==
The museum's location was formerly the site of a late 12th-century motte and bailey castle, built in 1160 to protect the Tay crossing. A great flood in 1209 washed the castle away. The King, William I, was staying in it at the time and had to escape with his wife and entourage by boat to Scone.

The Marshall Monument was designed by David Morison and sculpted by John Cochrane and Brothers.

Construction began in 1822, and it was opened as a library and museum by the Literary and Antiquarian Society of Perth in 1824. It is one of the United Kingdom's oldest purpose-built museums, and in 1915 it was gifted to the city by the Society on the condition that it was continued to be used only as a library or museum.

=== Extension ===
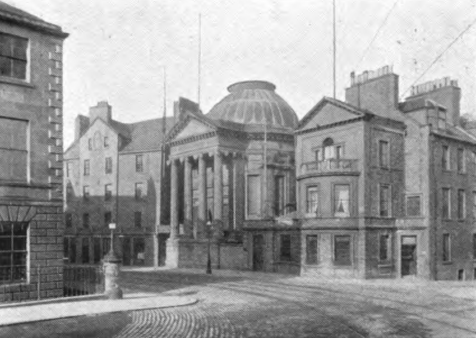
The Marshall Monument around 1900, prior to the demolition of the building to the left of it, which was replaced by today's museum and art gallery

After large donations of money and paintings were bequeathed to the museum, an extension was planned for the building. In 1930 an architecture competition took place and was judged by Sir John James Burnet, a Scottish architect. A Perth firm, Smart, Stewart & Mitchell, won and the extension was begun with the laying of the foundation stone by lord provost Thomas Dempster on 2 December 1932. Work continued between 1933 and 1935, and it was opened on 10 August 1935 by the Duke and Duchess of York, the future King George VI and Queen Elizabeth. This extension housed the donated paintings as well as the Natural History collections of Perthshire Society of Natural Science which had previously been held at its museum at 62–72 Tay Street.

It was made a category B listed building in May 1965.

== Exhibits ==
The collection of works by John Duncan Fergusson and Margaret Morris was relocated from the former Fergusson Gallery at the Perth Water Works building into the new gallery.

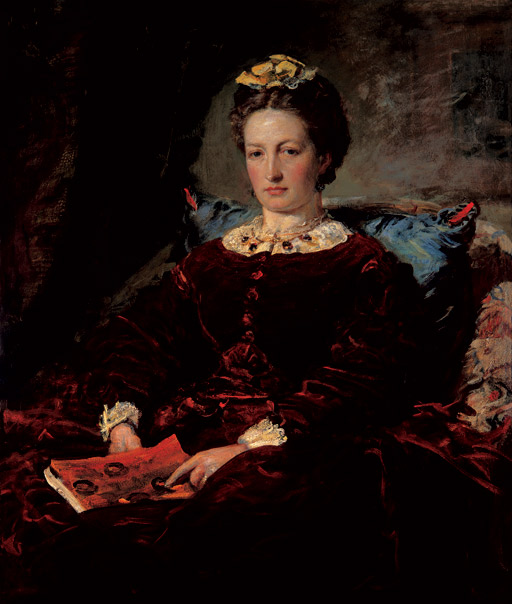
Portrait of Effie Millais by John Everett Millais, 1873

In July 2025 a collection of works by John Everett Millais was placed in the gallery under a long-term loan.

== See also ==
- List of listed buildings in Perth, Scotland
