= History of Perth, Scotland =

Perth (Scottish Gaelic: Peairt) is a city and former royal burgh in central Scotland. There has been a settlement at Perth since prehistoric times. Finds in and around Perth show that it was occupied by the Mesolithic hunter-gatherers who arrived in the area more than 8,000 years ago. Nearby Neolithic standing stones and circles followed the introduction of farming from about 4000 BC, and a remarkably well preserved Bronze Age log boat dated to around 1000 BC was found in the mudflats of the River Tay at Carpow to the east of Perth. Carpow was also the site of a Roman legionary fortress.

== Early history ==
The name Perth derives from a Pictish word meaning "wood", "copse" or "thicket", which links the town to the Picts or Britons, of whom the Picts may have been a subset. Perth's original name, and some archaeological evidence, indicate that there must have been a settlement here from earlier times, probably at a point where a river crossing or crossings coincided with a slightly raised natural mound on the west bank of the River Tay (which at Perth flows north–south), thus giving some protection for settlement from the frequent flooding. The original inhabitants subsequently merged with the Scots.

In the early 10th century, the city became an important centre of the Kingdom of Alba, which was later known as Scotland. During much of the medieval period the town was known colloquially as Sanct John's Toun (Scots for "Saint John's Town") because St John's Kirk, the church at the centre of the parish, was dedicated to St John the Baptist. The presence of Scone two miles northeast, a royal centre of Alba from at least the reign of Kenneth I mac Ailpín (843–58), later the site of the major Augustinian abbey of the same name founded by Alexander I (1107–1124), will have enhanced Perth's early importance.

Perth was often the unofficial capital of Scotland, due to the frequent residence of the royal court there. It was at Scone Abbey that the Stone of Destiny was kept, and on it the Kings of Scots were crowned, until the coronation of Alexander III (1249–1286).

== 12th and 13th centuries ==
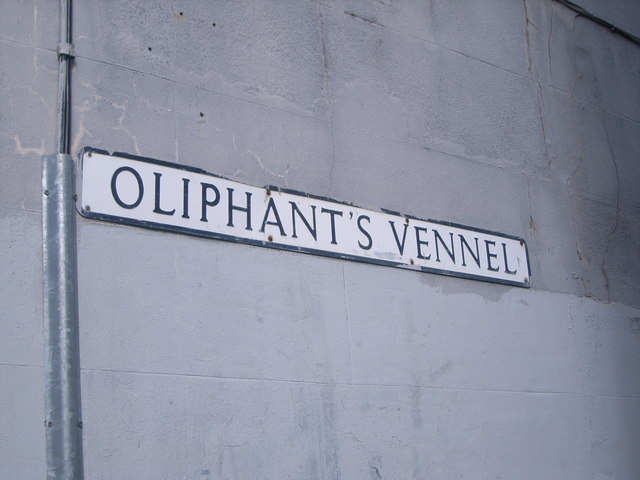
A street sign in the town centre

King David I (1124–1153) granted burgh status to the town in the early 12th century, and documents from this time refer to the status of the kirk there. Many of the records taken from this time were the result of the arrival of the Dominicans or Blackfriars. Blackfriars friary was established by Alexander II (1214–1249) by 1240. In the 12th and 13th centuries, Perth was one of the richest trading burghs in the kingdom (along with such towns as Berwick, Aberdeen and Roxburgh), residence of numerous craftsmen, organised into guilds – for example, the hammermen (metalworkers) and glovers. There was probably some decline in prosperity during the numerous wars of the 14th century. The town also carried out an extensive trade with the Continent, and examples of foreign luxury goods have been recovered from excavations within the town, such as Spanish silk, fine pottery from France. Wine will also have been a major import, not least for the use of the Church. The main destinations were France, the Low Countries and the Baltic. Medieval crafts are still remembered in some of the town's old street names, such as Skinnergate, Cutlog Vennel (see Vennels of Perth).

The royal castle (on or near the site of the present multi-storey car park adjacent to the new council offices) twas destroyed by a flood of the Tay in 1209, one of many that have afflicted Perth over the centuries. William I (1142–1214) restored Perth's burgh status, while it remained as the nominal capital of Scotland.

== 14th century: English occupation ==
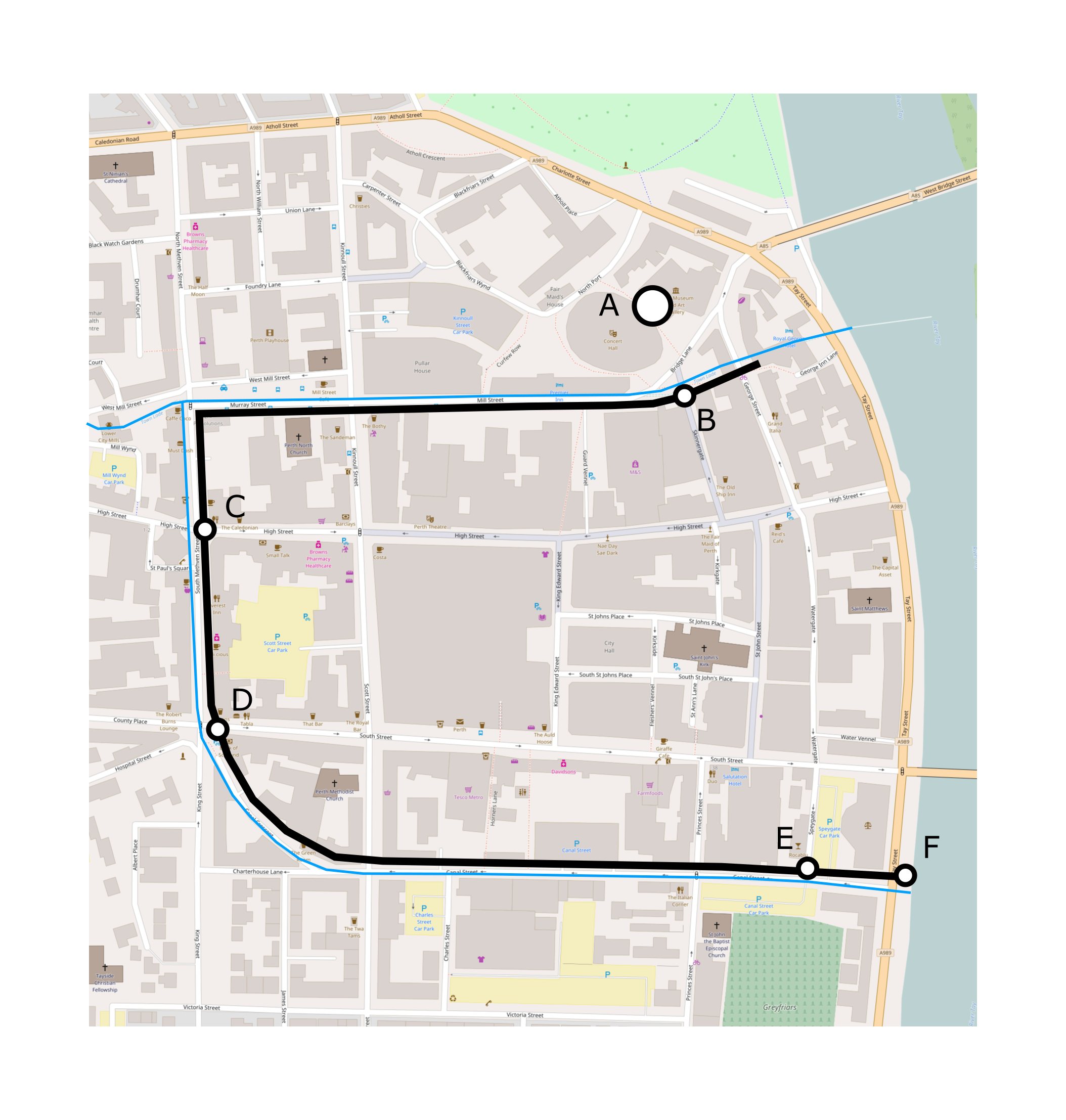
An indicative plan showing the medieval walls around Perth. The walls followed present day Murray Street, South Methven Street, Canal Crescent and Canal Street. Only one short part of the wall is still standing. The blue line marks the mill lade/ditches. The positions of gates (ports) and towers are marked including: (A) the site of Perth Castle; (B) Red Brig Port; (C) Turret Brig Port; (D) South Street Port; (E) Spey Tower; and (F) Monk's Tower

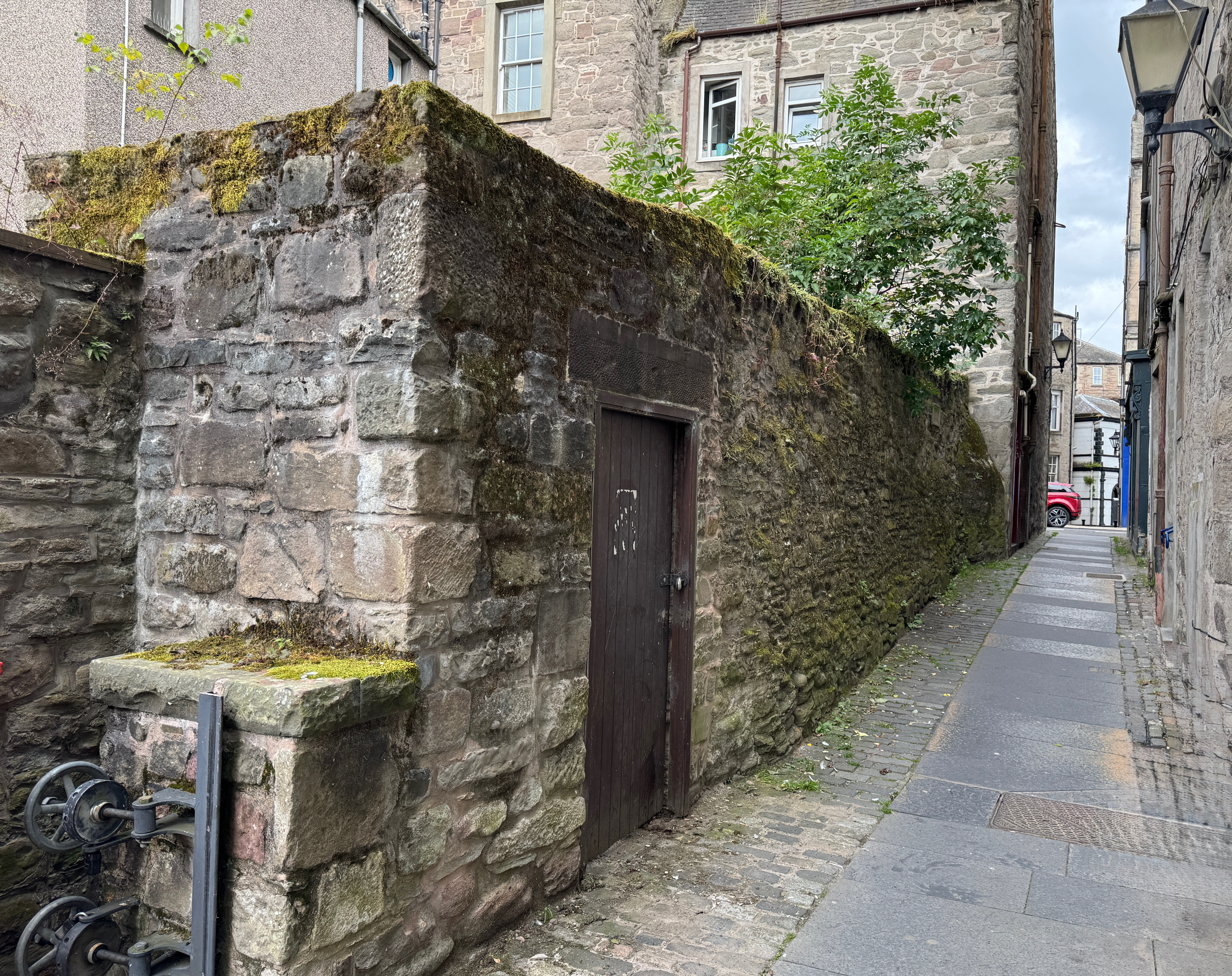
The last remnant of Perth's city walls, on George Inn Lane

King Edward I of England brought his armies to Perth in 1296 where the town, with only a ditch for defence and little fortification, fell quickly. Stronger fortifications were quickly implemented by the English, and plans to wall the town took shape in 1304. They remained standing until Robert the Bruce's recapture of Perth in 1312. He ordered the defences destroyed.

In 1332, the pretender Edward Balliol, son of John of Balliol, invaded to claim the throne of Scotland with the backing of Edward III of England. Robert the Bruce had died three years previously, and the regent of his infant son David II fell quickly at the hands of Balliol's army at the battle of Dupplin Moor. Balliol took Perth and the throne in September, and the Scottish Civil War ensued. Balliol himself was driven out quickly, only to return the next year. His deposition was only made complete in 1336; his supporters were eventually driven from Perth in 1339. As part of a plan to make Perth a permanent English base within Scotland, Edward III forced six monasteries in Perthshire and Fife to pay for the construction of massive stone defensive walls, towers and fortified gates around the town (1336). These followed roughly the lines of present-day Albert Close, Mill Street, South Methven Street, Charterhouse Lane and Canal Street (these streets evolved from a lane around the inside of the walls). Perth Lade, which was led off the River Almond in an artificial channel to power the burgh mills, formed an additional line of defence around the walls. The walls were pierced by several ports or gates, whose names are still remembered: the Red Brig Port (end of Skinnergate), Turret Brig Port (end of the High Street), Southgait Port (end of South Street) and the Spey Port (end of Speygate). There was probably also a minor gate leading to Curfew Row. These defences were the strongest of any town in Scotland in the Middle Ages. Though still largely complete at the time of the 1745 Jacobite rising, they began to be demolished from the second half of the 18th century, and there are now no visible remains, at least above ground. The last tower, called the Monk's Tower (corner of Tay Street and Canal Street) was demolished about 1810.

== Late 14th and 15th century ==
During the Middle Ages, Perth's only parish church was the burgh kirk of St John the Baptist (St John's Kirk). Medieval Perth had many other ecclesiastical buildings, including the houses of the Dominicans (Blackfriars), Observantine Franciscans (Greyfriars) and Perth Charterhouse, Scotland's only Carthusian Priory, or "Charterhouse". A little to the west of the town was the house of the Carmelites or Whitefriars, at Tullilum (corner of Jeanfield Road and Riggs Road). Also at Tullilum (a name preserved by today's Tullylumb Terrace, near Perth Royal Infirmary) was a manor or tower-house of the bishops of Dunkeld. The bishops also owned a house within the burgh itself, at the corner of South Street and Watergate.

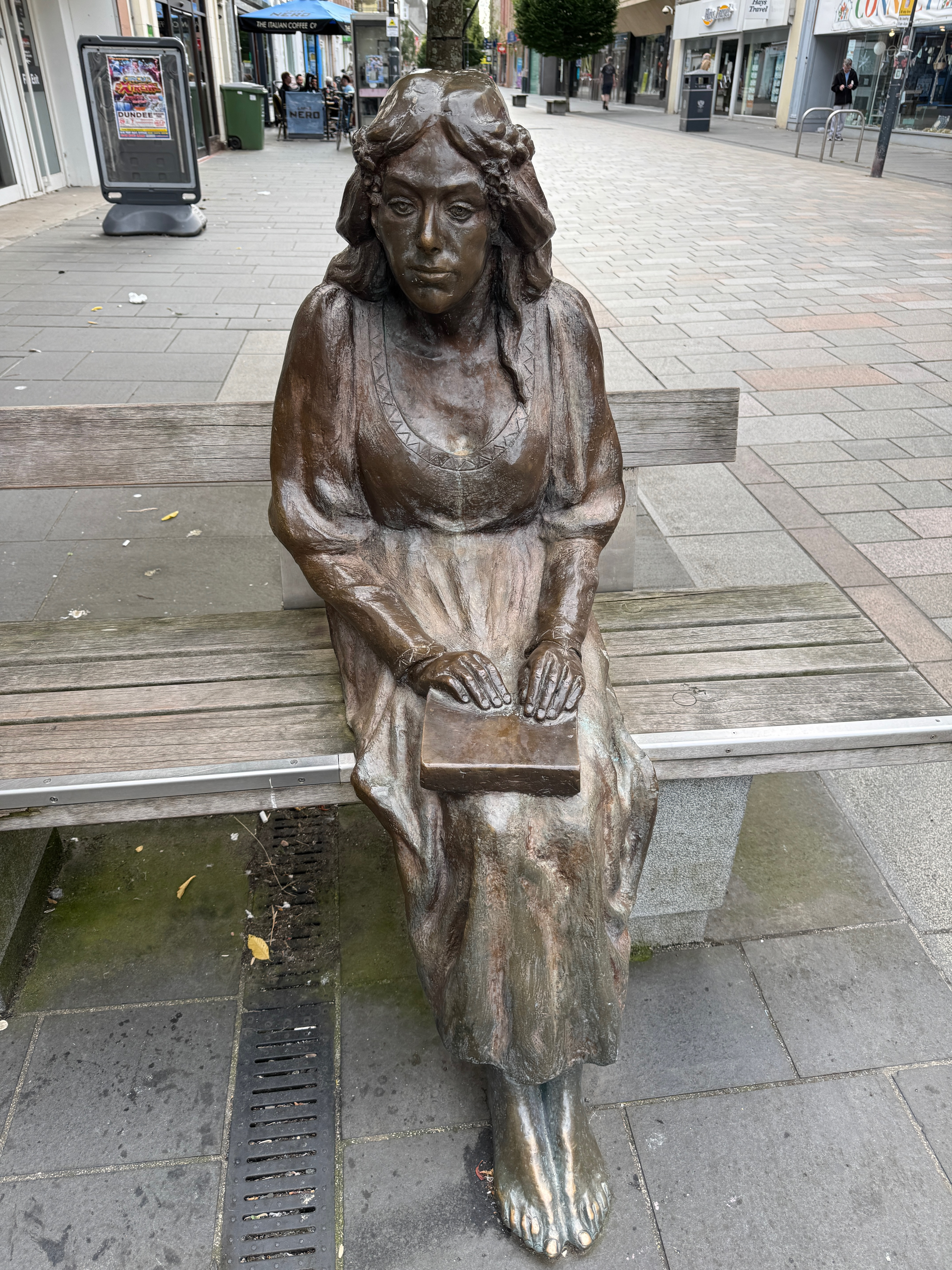
A bronze statue of a seated Fair Maid in the High Street

The theatre of trial by combat was first brought by Perth in 1396. The Battle of the Clans pitted Clan Chattan against Clan Cameron, each thirty strong, at the town's North Inch. This 'tournament' (actually an attempt to resolve a disruptive Highland feud) took place under the gaze of King Robert III (1390–1406) and his court, who watched the spectacle from the Gilten Arbour, a garden attached to the House of the Blackfriars. Although records vary, Clan Chattan is understood to have won the battle, with the last of their opponents fleeing to safety across the Tay. The assassination of King James I occurred in 1437 when rebel noblemen forced entry into the house of the Dominicans or Blackfriars. James was the last king to command from a throne at Perth; the capital was moved to Edinburgh in 1437.

== 16th century ==
Perth was a focal point for the religious conflicts of the 16th century. In 1543, three men were hanged for vandalising a statue of Saint Francis. In May 1543, the Blackfriars monastery was attacked.

Mary of Guise served as regent of her daughter Mary, Queen of Scots. She held a Parliament in 1555 and enacted legislation which diminished the powers of craft organisations in favour of merchant guilds. This led to protests, and she visited Perth two or three times to satisfy the craft incorporations, and eventually withdrew the legislation.

John Knox began the Scottish Reformation from grass-roots level with a sermon against 'idolatry' in the burgh kirk of St John the Baptist on 11 May 1559. An inflamed mob quickly destroyed the altars in the Kirk, then attacked the Houses of the Greyfriars and Blackfriars, and the Carthusian Priory. Knox later blamed these events on "the rascal multitude". Scone Abbey was sacked shortly afterwards. Mary of Guise was successful in quelling the rioting but Presbyterianism in Perth remained strong. There are no visible remains of the pre-Reformation religious houses of Perth, though their approximate locations are perpetuated in modern street-names.

Mary, Queen of Scots, made her formal Royal Entry to Perth on 17 September 1561. The town gave her a present of a gold heart full of gold coins. The pageants had an anti-Catholic theme, and Mary fainted during the events. Anne of Denmark, the wife of James VI and I, made her Entry to Perth at the end of June 1591. In August 1600 James VI rode from Falkland Palace to Gowrie House, the home of the Provost of Perth, the Earl of Gowrie. As a result of a misunderstanding, or a conspiracy (see the Gowrie Conspiracy), the king's retainers killed the Earl and his sons.

Records survive from the incorporations of the Perth craft of carpenters and barbers, and the hammermen (metal workers), and others. Apprentices progressing to become master craftsmen in 16th-century Perth traditionally had to pay for a banquet and hold a football match. The records of the Kirk Session note the censure of people enjoying "guising" or mummery in costume and disguise.

== 17th and 18th centuries ==
Charles II was crowned at Scone, traditional site of the investiture of Kings of Scots, in 1651. Within a year, Oliver Cromwell's Parliamentarians, fresh from victory in the English Civil War, came to Perth. Cromwell established a fortified citadel on the South Inch in 1652, one of five built around Scotland at this time to overawe and hold down the country. Perth's hospital, bridge and several dozen houses were demolished to provide building materials for this fort. Even grave slabs from the Greyfriars Burial Ground were used. It was given to the town in 1661 not long after Cromwell's death, and began almost immediately to be dismantled. The ditch, originally filled with water from the Tay, was still traceable in the late 18th century, but there are now no visible remains. The restoration of Charles II was not without incident, and with the Act of Settlement came the Jacobite risings, to which Perth was supportive. The town was occupied by Jacobite supporters thrice in total (1689, 1715 and 1745).

== Late 18th century to present ==
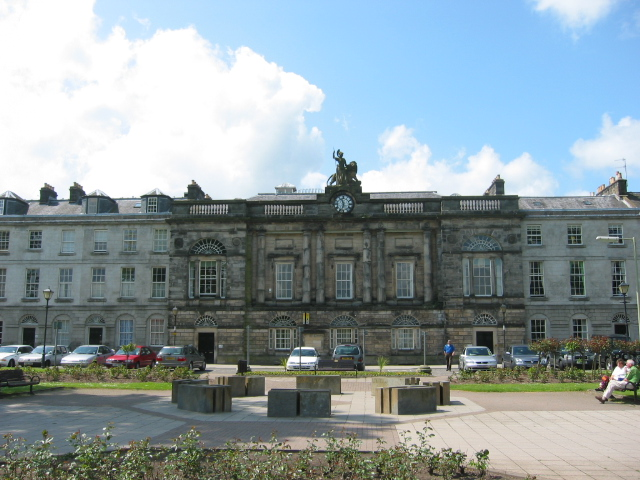
The Old Academy in Rose Terrace

In 1760, a new building for Perth Academy was begun, and major industry came to the town, now with a population of 15,000. Linen, leather, bleached products and whisky were its major exports, although the town had been a key port for centuries. A permanent military presence was established in the city with the completion of Queen's Barracks in 1793.

In 1804, Thomas Dick received an invitation from local patrons to act as teacher in the Secession school at Methven that led to a ten-years residence there for him. The school was distinguished by efforts on his part towards popular improvement, including a zealous promotion of the study of science, the foundation of a people's library, and what was substantially a mechanic's institute. Under the name Literary and Philosophical Societies, adapted to the middling and lower ranks of the community, the extension of such establishments was recommended by him in five papers published in the Monthly Magazine in 1814.

The Perth Royal Infirmary was built in 1838 as the Perth City and County Infirmary. The original building, designed by William Macdonald Mackenzie, now houses the A. K. Bell Library. In 1914, it relocated to Taymount Terrace due to cramped conditions – making the hospital one of the first in Scotland to deal with X-rays. Murray Royal Asylum was established in Perth via the will of James Murray (died 1814), and opened in 1827 as the Murray Royal Lunatic Asylum, with the original building being designed by William Burn. Originally designed to house 80 patients it was expanded several times in the next two centuries. 1876 saw the foundation of what would become Hillside Home, a facility for patients with incurable conditions, which moved to Dundee Road in 1883 and functioned until 1997. In 1888, Hillside gained a building for patients with tuberculosis and in 1901 Barnhill Sanatorium was opened.

Piped water and gas became available in the 1820s, and electricity in 1901.

Despite being a garrison town and major developments, social and industrial, during the First World War, Perth remained relatively unchanged, according to Dr Bill Harding in his study of the effects of the war on the people of Perth, titled On Flows the Tay: Perth and the First World War (2000).

Given its location, Perth was perfectly placed to become a key transport centre with the coming of the railways. Perth railway station was built in 1848. Horse-drawn carriage became popular in the 1890s although they were quickly replaced by electric trams (of the Perth and District Tramways Company firstly, then Perth Corporation Tramways).

During the Second World War, Perth's main cemetery, Wellshill Cemetery, was enlarged to provide space for the war dead of the Free Polish Forces based in Scotland. The graves are in a special section of the cemetery. The gravestones have the Polish eagle engraved on them, and at the entrance to the section is a Polish war memorial.

The Great Flood of Perth occurred on 17 January 1993, causing damage amounting to around £10 million. The city installed flood defences, which were completed in 2001.

In January 2023, the most deadly fire in Scotland since 2017 took place in Perth at the New County Hotel, resulting in three deaths and eleven injuries.

== Publications ==
In 1906, David Crawford Smith's The Historians of Perth and Other Local and Topographical Writers, Up to the End of the Nineteenth Century was published. He evaluates the work of 24 authors: Henry Adamson, James Cant, Reverend James Scott, the Morison family (Francis, Robert Sr, James, Robert Jr, William and David), George Penny, Reverend Parker Lawson, Thomas Hay Marshall, David Peacock, P. R. Drummond, William Sievwright, Reverend William Marshall, Thomas Hunter, Robert Scott Fittis, Colin A. Hunt, Reverend Robert Milne, Reverend George T. S. Farquhar, Peter Baxter, James Bridges and Francis Buchanan White.

== Sources ==
- Stavert, Marion L., The Perth Guildry Book 1452–1601, Scottish Record Society, (1993), transcript of guild record.
- Milne, Robert, The Blackfriars of Perth, Edinburgh (1893), chartulary of the Blackfriars.
