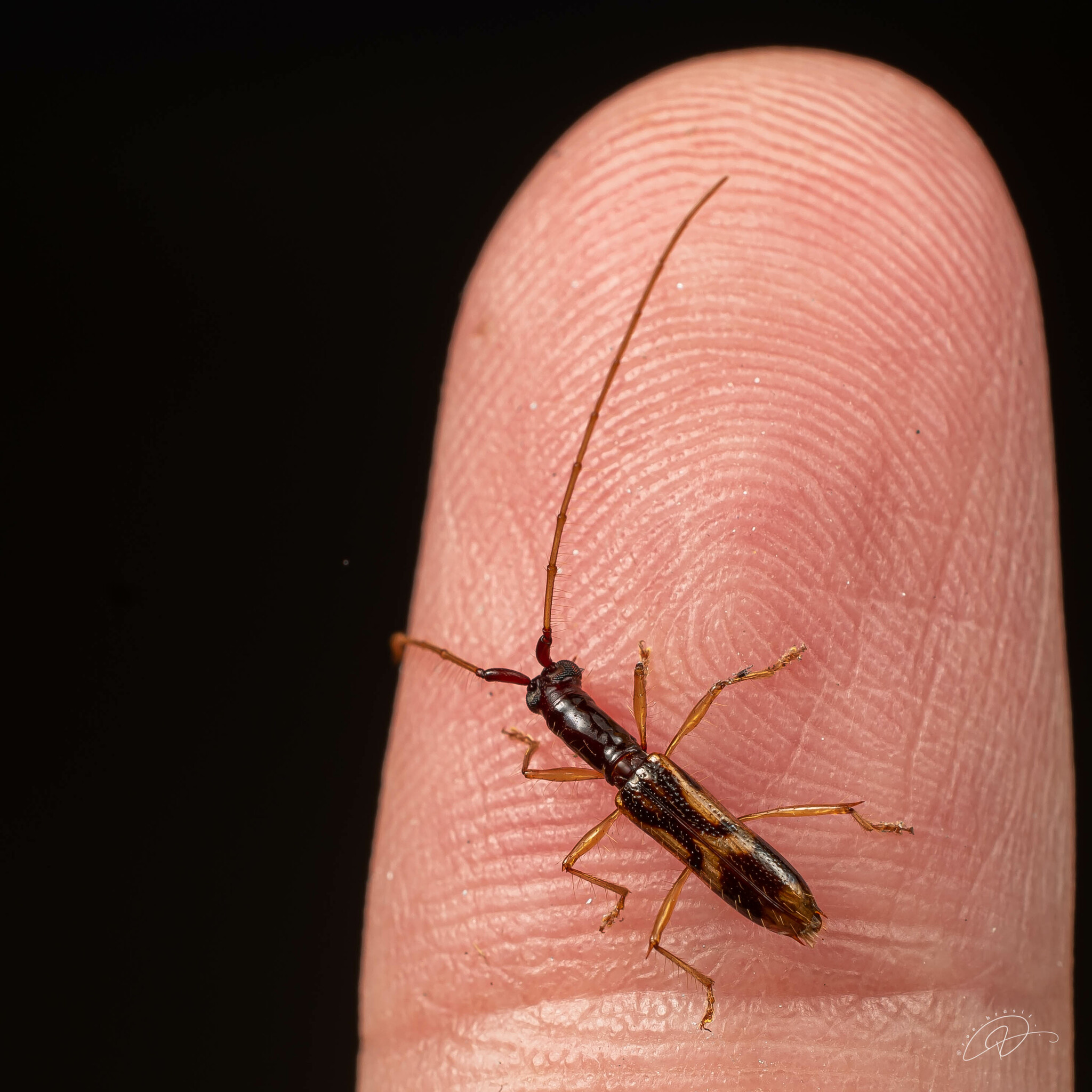

Scientific classification
- Domain: Eukaryota
- Kingdom: Animalia
- Phylum: Arthropoda
- Class: Insecta
- Order: Coleoptera
- Suborder: Polyphaga
- Infraorder: Cucujiformia
- Family: Cerambycidae
- Genus: Glyptoscapus
- Species: G. pallidulus

Binomial name
- Glyptoscapus pallidulus (White, 1855)

= Glyptoscapus pallidulus =

Species of beetle

Glyptoscapus pallidulus is a species of beetle in the family Cerambycidae. It was first described by Francis Buchanan White in 1855.
