= Perthshire Society of Natural Science =

Natural science society in Perthshire, Scotland

- Abbreviation: PSNS
- Founded: 1867 (159 years ago)
- Type: Scottish Charity
- Registration no.: SC012718
- Headquarters: A. K. Bell Library
- Location: Perth, Scotland, United Kingdom
- Region served: Perth and Kinross
- President: Dr. Clare Scanlan
- Website: www.psns.org.uk

Perthshire Society of Natural Science (PSNS) is one of the oldest scientific societies in Scotland, having been established in 1867. Under its parent body, it has three sections covering Nature (formerly Botany and Ornithology), Archaeology & History, and Photography (also known as Perthshire Photographic Society). Additionally it runs a series of talks on a broad science theme called Curious Minds.

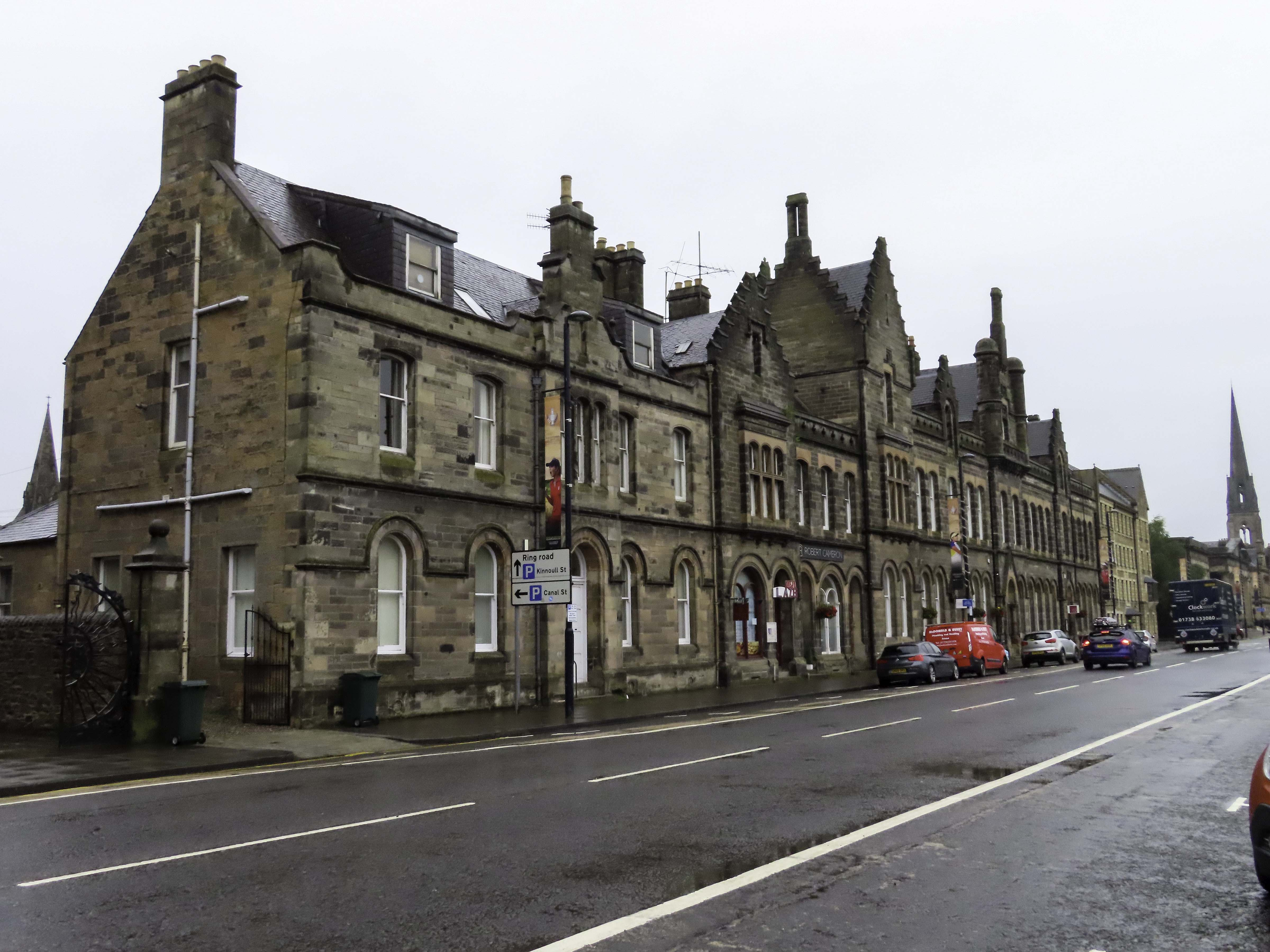
The society's original home, on Perth's Tay Street

Now based at the A. K. Bell Library in Perth, Scotland, the society was initially composed of men, but by the end of the 19th century, around a quarter of its members were women. The membership ranged across social classes, hence it was known as "a society for all".

Whereas specimens were physically collected by the society's members during its early years, now digital photography is used, along with digital data, to create records.

In 1935, the society donated paintings and natural-history collections to Perth Museum and Art Gallery to display in its new extension, which was opened by the Duke and Duchess of York, the future King George VI and Queen Elizabeth.

The society undertook an excavation at Pitmiddle village (whose history dates to the 12th century) and Elcho Nunnery, and published its report in 1988.

The society's longest-serving member was Rhoda Fothergill, who died in 2019. She joined in 1965, and was its secretary when she retired 47 years later. Many of her papers, such as A History of King James VI Hospital, were published in the journals of the PSNS. Other notable past members include Charles Macintosh, who was known as "the Perth Naturalist".

The society published The Flora of Perthshire, by Francis Buchanan White, in 1898, using records provided by members, including Macintosh. White identified thirteen species of fungi previously unknown in the British Isles, four of them new to science. He shared this interest with Beatrix Potter, who had often visited the area since she was a child, and they exchanged specimens and drawings. He left his collection of specimens, together with some botanical illustrations by Potter, to Perth Museum.

Architect John Young was one of the society's early members. His son, George, also joined the society.

Sir Thomas Moncreiffe, 7th Baronet, was a president of the society. The building's museum, formerly at 62–72 Tay Street in Perth, was built in his memory in 1881, two years after his death.

Another former president was W. H. Findlay, a noted photographer. Around a quarter of his lifetime collection of 25,000 photographs are now housed in A. K. Bell Library, with the rest in the society's possession. Fellow photographer Magnus Jackson became a member in 1877.

As of 2023, the society's president is Clare Scanlan. She was preceded in the role by David Bowler.
