= Rhoda Fothergill =

Scottish historian, educator and archaeologist

- Fothergill around 1952
- Born: Agnes Hay Somerville Fothergill; 1929; Lewisham, London, England
- Died: 17 June 2019 (aged 90); Perth, Scotland
- Occupations: Historian, educator and archaeologist
- Awards: British Empire Medal

Academic work
- Notable works: History of King James VI Hospital

Agnes Hay Somerville "Rhoda" Fothergill (1929 – 17 June 2019) was a Scottish historian, educator and archaeologist. She published several historical guides to Perth, Scotland. Her focus areas were Old Perth, the Greyfriars Burial Ground and people of 19th-century Perth. She was the longest-serving member of the Perthshire Society of Natural Science (PSNS). Her contribution as a historian was recognised with a British Empire Medal in 2014.

== Early life ==
Fothergill was born in Lewisham, London, in 1929, to Scottish parents. They moved back to their hometown of Dunfermline in the lead up to World War II, before relocating to Perth. She studied in Edinburgh, St Andrews and Dundee, although she spent most of her life in Perth. She was educated at Perth Academy between 1943 and 1947, then graduated from the University of St Andrews in 1952.

== Career ==
In 1953, she began a 24-year teaching career at Kinnoull Primary School. In 1977, she moved to Caledonian Road Primary School.

In 1968, three years after joining the Perthshire Society of Natural Science, she was appointed its secretary, a role in which she remained for 47 years. She was the society's longest-serving member at the time of her death. Many of her papers, such as A History of King James VI Hospital, were published in the journals of the Perthshire Society of Natural Science (PSNS).

Fothergill served on the Ancient Monuments Board and was a founder member of the Perth Civic Trust.

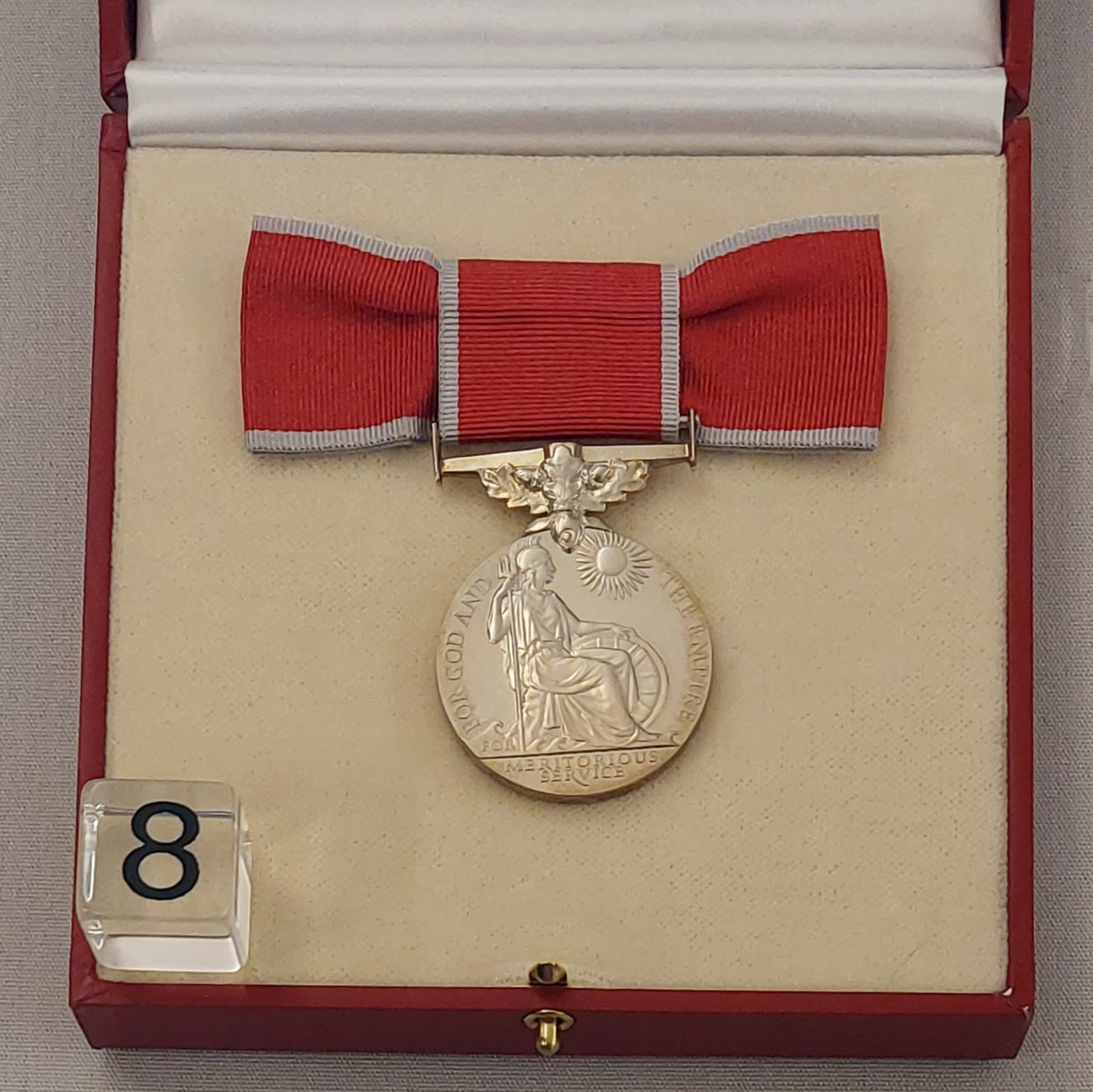
Fothergill's British Empire Medal is held in the Rhoda Fothergill collection, MS347/5/4/1, in the Perth and Kinross Archive.

== Awards and recognition ==
Fothergill received the DK Thomson Award for her contribution to the city of Perth in January 2004.

She was presented with a Perth Civic Trust Award in 2007 and a tree was planted to mark the milestone.

The British Empire Medal was conferred on her in the New Year's Honours List in 2014, in recognition of her work on the history and preservation of Perth and Perthshire.

In 2017, she was made Honorary Life President of the Perthshire Society of Natural Science in recognition of her 50 years of service to its council.

== Death ==
Fothergill died in 2019, aged 90. Her funeral was held at Craigie and Moncreiffe Church in the Craigie area of Perth, where she had lived, in Pitheavlis Crescent, for over sixty years.
