= David Peacock =

David or Dave Peacock may refer to:

- David Peacock (author) (c. 1787–1853), Scottish author and historian
- David Peacock (archaeologist) (1939–2015), British archaeologist
- Dave Peacock (businessman) (born 1968), former president of Anheuser-Busch
- Dave Peacock (musician) (born 1945), English musician and bass guitarist
- David Peacock (American football) (1890–?), American college football player, coach and politician
- David Peacock (bowls) (born 1970), British lawn bowler
- David Peacock (theatre administrator) (1924-2000), British theatre administrator
