= History of Perth =

History of Perth can refer to:

- History of Perth, Scotland
- History of Perth, Western Australia
