= Phaedinus lanio =

Scientific classification
- Kingdom: Animalia
- Phylum: Arthropoda
- Clade: Pancrustacea
- Class: Insecta
- Order: Coleoptera
- Suborder: Polyphaga
- Infraorder: Cucujiformia
- Family: Cerambycidae
- Genus: Phaedinus
- Species: P. lanio

Binomial name
- Phaedinus lanio Guérin-Méneville, 1838

Species of beetle

Phaedinus lanio is a species of beetle in the family Cerambycidae. It was described by Félix Édouard Guérin-Méneville in 1838.
