= Phaedinus tricolor =

Scientific classification
- Domain: Eukaryota
- Kingdom: Animalia
- Phylum: Arthropoda
- Class: Insecta
- Order: Coleoptera
- Suborder: Polyphaga
- Infraorder: Cucujiformia
- Family: Cerambycidae
- Genus: Phaedinus
- Species: P. tricolor

Binomial name
- Phaedinus tricolor Dupont, 1834

Species of beetle

Phaedinus tricolor is a species of beetle in the family Cerambycidae. It was described by Dupont in 1834.
