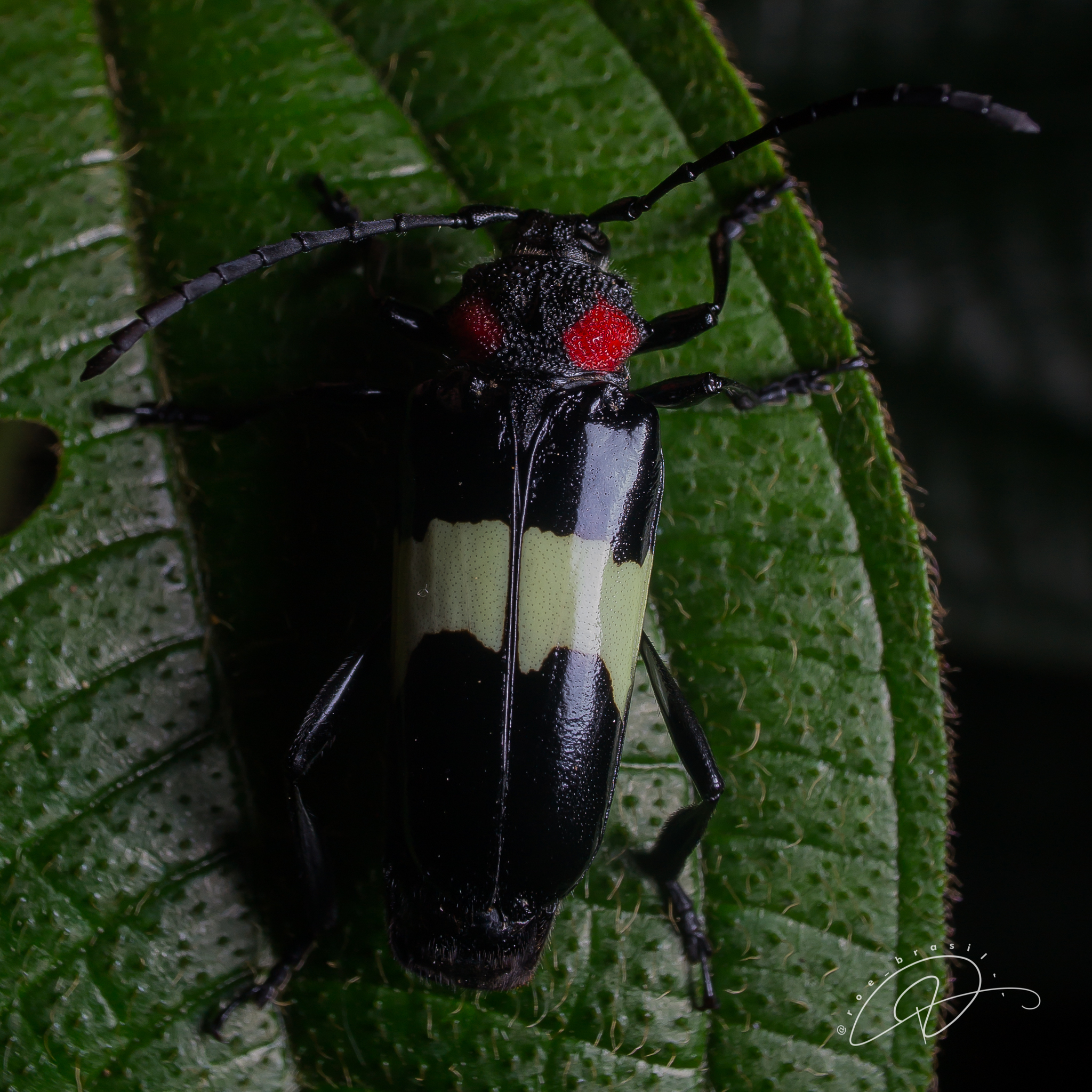

Scientific classification
- Domain: Eukaryota
- Kingdom: Animalia
- Phylum: Arthropoda
- Class: Insecta
- Order: Coleoptera
- Suborder: Polyphaga
- Infraorder: Cucujiformia
- Family: Cerambycidae
- Genus: Phaedinus
- Species: P. martii

Binomial name
- Phaedinus martii (Perty, 1832)

= Phaedinus martii =

Species of beetle

Phaedinus martii is a species of beetle in the family Cerambycidae. It was first described by Perty in 1832.
