= W. H. Findlay =

Scottish photographer and historian

William Hall Findlay
- Findlay in the latter half of the 20th century
- Born: 8 November 1911; Glasgow, Scotland
- Died: 3 January 2006 (aged 94); Kinnoull, Scotland
- Education: University of Glasgow
- Occupations: Photographer, historian
- Known for: Photography collection
- Notable work: Heritage of Perth (1984)
- Spouse: Marjorie Findlay (d. 1991)

William Hall Findlay (8 November 1911 – 3 January 2006) was a Scottish photographer and historian. Between the 1950s and the 1980s, he took photographs of the townscape of Perth, Perth and Kinross, illustrating its transition into the modern era. Many of these were featured in his 1984 book Heritage of Perth. Around a quarter of his lifetime collection of 25,000 photographs are now housed in Perth's A. K. Bell Library.

== Early life ==
Findlay was born in 1911 in Glasgow. He attended Allan Glen's School over eight years, both at junior and senior levels. He developed an interest in botany, and won a prize—Charles Albert Hall's 1919 publication The Open Book of Nature—for his collection of wildflowers.

Findlay was also a keen sportsman, particularly adept at athletics and rugby.

Prior to leaving Allan Glen's, he spent a year studying Latin and Higher Mathematics, in order to achieve the necessary qualifications to progress onto university.

He enrolled at the University of Glasgow in 1931, and won the John Hunter medal for practical botany at the end of his first year. He went on to qualify MB ChB with commendation in 1936, before assisting his elder brother Tom in his general practice in Thurso for the better part of a year.

== Career ==
=== Healthcare ===
Findlay became Resident Medical Officer at Knightswood Hospital in 1938, before transferring to Mearnskirk in the same capacity in 1939. He qualified as a Doctor of Public Health after studying, at the University of Glasgow once more, for three years.

In September 1939, at the onset of World War II, Findlay was charged with evacuating patients from Mearnskirk. He sailed from Renfrew Pier to Millport. Two months later, he was appointed Assistant Medical Officer of Health, as well as Tuberculosis Officer for Stirlingshire.

At the conclusion of the war, in the new year of 1946, he was appointed in similar roles for Perthshire.

Upon the formation of the National Health Service (NHS) in 1948, he moved into hospital service, and spent the rest of his professional career as a consultant in chest medicine in Perth.

Findlay accepted the opportunity of early retirement in 1970.

=== Photography ===
Findlay became a qualified professional photographer after passing his exam for the Associateship of the Royal Photographic Society.

He became a founding member of (and official photographer for) the Perth Civic Trust in 1967, and went on, over a period of fifty years, to produce a pictorial record of the city.

Findlay was also president of the Perthshire Society of Natural Science, including at the time of its centenary in 1967, and of the society's photographic section for three.

His 270-page book Heritage of Perth (1984), featuring 328 photographs, earned him the D. C. Thomson Award "for his contribution to Perth's cultural life in that year". The book had a second edition published, with a foreword provided by Magnus Magnusson. A leather-bound copy was gifted to the Charles, Prince of Wales, at the ribbon-cutting ceremony to mark the opening of the A. K. Bell Library in 1995.

Findlay was also a Rotarian for 25 years. He was awarded the Cairncross Trophy, for his services to Perth, in 1999.

== Personal life ==
After the death of his wife, Marjorie, in 1991, he founded the Bertha Trust (Bertha being an old name for Perth) to assist families in need in Perth and Kinross. Over 700 families were helped in the first decade of the Trust.

Despite a decline in his mobility, and a fall and illness in spring 2003, Findlay released a 2005 Tay Calendar, featuring a collection of photographic slides.

== Death ==
Findlay lived on his own, with the help of his family and carers, at his 9 Rosemount Place home in Kinnoull, up until his death in 2006, aged 94.

He had two children – a son and a daughter.
