= Bill Wilkie =

Bill Wilkie MBE
- Wilkie playing his accordion outside his shop in Perth city centre

Background information
- Born: William Wilkie; 6 January 1922; Perth, Scotland
- Origin: Perth, Scotland
- Died: 1 May 2017 (aged 95) Perth, Scotland
- Genres: Scottish accordion music
- Instruments: Piano accordion, acoustic guitar, melodeon, fiddle
- Years active: 1940s–1990s
- Formerly of: Just Five

William Wilkie (6 January 1922 – 1 May 2017) was a Scottish musician and businessman. He was regarded as a leader of Scottish accordion music and, in 1949, established the All-Scotland Accordion & Fiddle Festival (now the Perth Accordion & Fiddle Festival), which still takes place today.

Wilkie's career spanned five decades, during which he met and performed for several British prime ministers, including Edward Heath, Harold Wilson, Alec Douglas-Home and Margaret Thatcher.

== Early life ==
Born early in the new year of 1922, at 21 King Street in Perth, Scotland, Wilkie was the youngest of four children (two brothers and two sisters). His father, a fiddle player, was a self-employed tailor. His mother was a housewife, but during hard times she worked at Paterson's, a music shop in Perth's Methven Street, as a caretaker. Wilkie joined her periodically, and sometimes they sat and listened to the practicing musicians in the studios above the shop.

His mother gave him a mouth organ when he was five years old, and he quickly became an aficionado on it.

During the Great Depression, he borrowed an accordion from someone at Scout camp. After playing it for a while, his mother bought him a used 48-bass Hohner Verdi I.

== Career ==
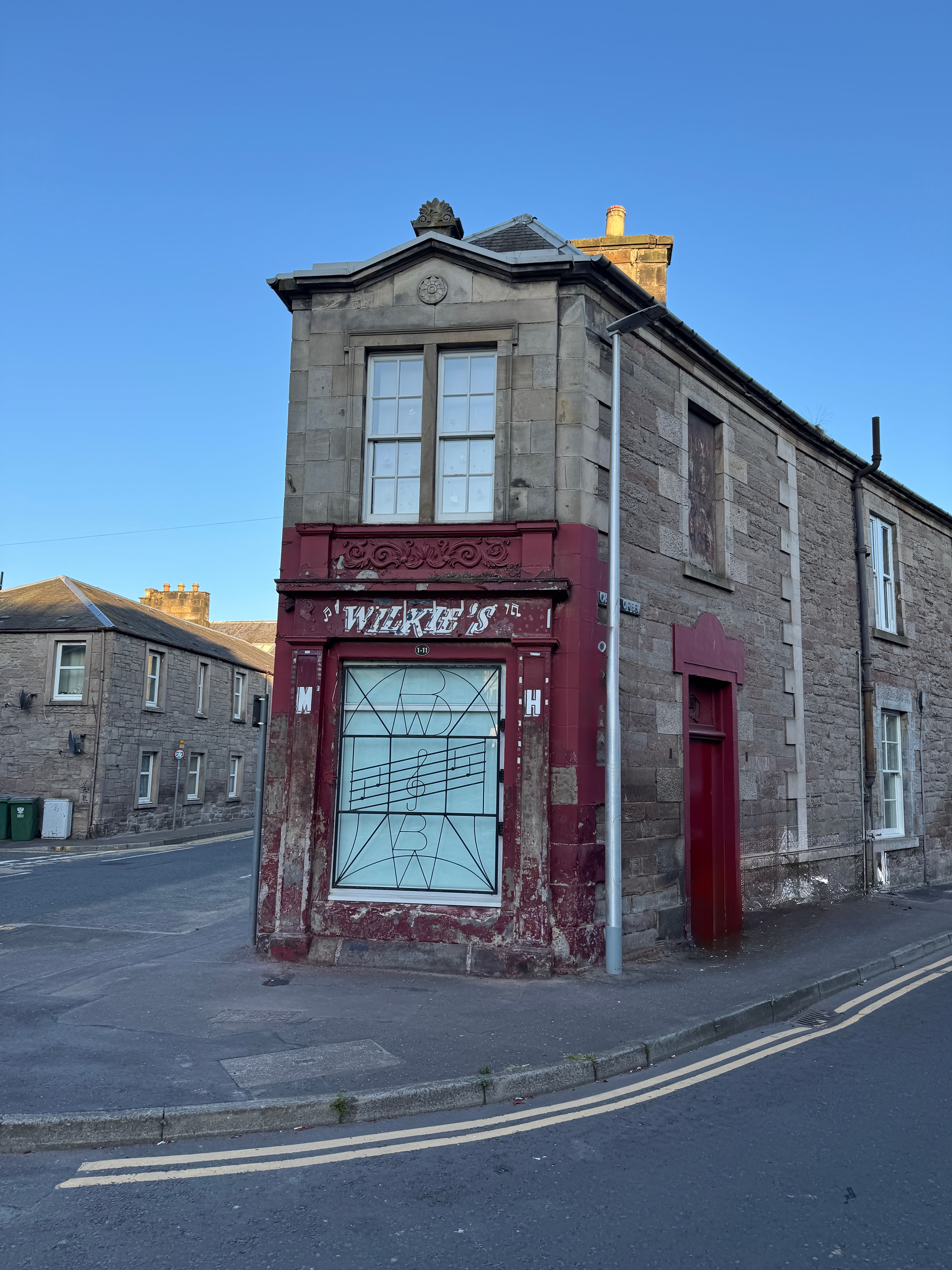
Wilkie's former shop, pictured in 2024

Wilkie began playing mostly by ear, but had occasional lessons with a music teacher. By the age of 13, he was organising concerts for himself, and two years later he was playing with Perth-based dance band the Collegians.

At 16, under the tutelage of Dr Edward Sarafin, he won the accordion class at the 1938 Dundee Music Festival.

During service with the Royal Air Force in World War II, he formed a concert party and dance band. Upon being posted to Tealing, he joined the station's entertainment section as a solo accordionist and found himself doing theatre shows at the garrison.

He drew the attention of stage director Ralph Reader, creator of the Gang Show, and travelled to India (performing at the Maharaj) and other parts of the British Empire with an ensemble called Just Five, which included Norrie Paramor and a young drummer, Peter Sellers. Sellers and Wilkie (whom Sellers called Tottie Wee, due to Wikie's small stature and love of whisky) became lifelong friends.

After the war, Wilkie returned and joined Gang No. 6 for a tour of France, Germany, Belgium and the Netherlands.

After returning to Perth, he began in a sales position at Paterson's. He later formed the Bill Wilkie Dance Band and, with his wife, he established a home teaching studio.

He founded the inaugural All-Scotland Accordion & Fiddle Festival in 1949. Its inaugural show was held the following year at Perth City Hall.

In 1959, he converted a cobblers' shop, wedged between Perth's Canal Crescent and Charterhouse Lane, into Wilkie's Music House, which was very popular over the next fifty years. After also having a shop in Perth's James Street and in Dundee, the three were combined into the Canal Crescent location in 1984, initially known as Wilkie's New Music House.

In 2010, Wilkie was awarded the Hamish Henderson Services to Traditional Music Award by the Scottish Traditional Music Hall of Fame.

In 2011, he considered moving to smaller premises, but decided instead to retire. Wilkie's son-in-law Bill Colburn moved the business online, but it has since ceased trading.

== Personal life ==
In 1940, Wilkie was called up into the Royal Air Force, and completed his basic training at Redcar. He was posted to Kinnell, near Friockheim in Angus.

After demobilisation in 1946, he returned to Perth, where he married Ena, whom he met before the war. She was an organist in her father's church, Coupar Angus Congregational, as well as being a pianist in a local dance band.

In 1994, Wilkie was awarded the MBE for services to the All-Scotland Accordion & Fiddle Festival.

Ena died in 2003, and Wilkie survived her by fourteen years. He died in 2017, aged 95, at Perth Royal Infirmary. His funeral was held on 11 May at St Leonard's-in-the-Fields Church. He was buried in Wellshill Cemetery.

Wilkie's grandson, Richard Colburn, is a drummer who has played with Snow Patrol and Belle and Sebastian. His granddaughter, Sharon Colburn, has run an arabesque dancewear shop in Perth's Hospital Street, 200 yards (180 m) from Wilkie's music shop, since 1988.
