= Phaedinus flavipes =

Scientific classification
- Domain: Eukaryota
- Kingdom: Animalia
- Phylum: Arthropoda
- Class: Insecta
- Order: Coleoptera
- Suborder: Polyphaga
- Infraorder: Cucujiformia
- Family: Cerambycidae
- Genus: Phaedinus
- Species: P. flavipes

Binomial name
- Phaedinus flavipes (Thunberg, 1822)

Species of beetle

Phaedinus flavipes is a species of beetle in the family Cerambycidae. It was described by Thunberg in 1822.
