= Phaedinus abnormalis =

Scientific classification
- Domain: Eukaryota
- Kingdom: Animalia
- Phylum: Arthropoda
- Class: Insecta
- Order: Coleoptera
- Suborder: Polyphaga
- Infraorder: Cucujiformia
- Family: Cerambycidae
- Genus: Phaedinus
- Species: P. abnormalis

Binomial name
- Phaedinus abnormalis Tippmann, 1953

Species of beetle

Phaedinus abnormalis is a species of beetle in the family Cerambycidae. It was described by Tippmann in 1953.
