= Phaedinus schaufussi =

Scientific classification
- Kingdom: Animalia
- Phylum: Arthropoda
- Class: Insecta
- Order: Coleoptera
- Suborder: Polyphaga
- Infraorder: Cucujiformia
- Family: Cerambycidae
- Genus: Phaedinus
- Species: P. schaufussi

Binomial name
- Phaedinus schaufussi Nonfried, 1890

Species of beetle

Phaedinus schaufussi is a species of beetle in the family Cerambycidae. It was described by Nonfried in 1890.
