= Phaedinus carbonelli =

Scientific classification
- Domain: Eukaryota
- Kingdom: Animalia
- Phylum: Arthropoda
- Class: Insecta
- Order: Coleoptera
- Suborder: Polyphaga
- Infraorder: Cucujiformia
- Family: Cerambycidae
- Genus: Phaedinus
- Species: P. carbonelli

Binomial name
- Phaedinus carbonelli Monné, 1999

Species of beetle

Phaedinus carbonelli is a species of beetle in the family Cerambycidae. It was described by Marcela L. Monné in 1999. It is named in honour of the Uruguayan entomologist Carlos S. Carbonell (1917–2019).
