= Phaedinus corallinus =

Scientific classification
- Domain: Eukaryota
- Kingdom: Animalia
- Phylum: Arthropoda
- Class: Insecta
- Order: Coleoptera
- Suborder: Polyphaga
- Infraorder: Cucujiformia
- Family: Cerambycidae
- Genus: Phaedinus
- Species: P. corallinus

Binomial name
- Phaedinus corallinus Gounelle, 1911

Species of beetle

Phaedinus corallinus is a species of beetle in the family Cerambycidae. It was described by Gounelle in 1911.
