= The Historians of Perth, and Other Local and Topographical Writers, Up to the End of the Nineteenth Century =

Work by David Crawford Smith

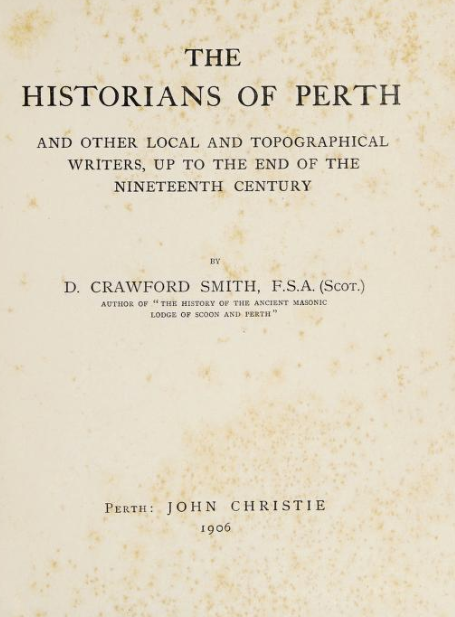
- Title page
- Author: David Crawford Smith
- Language: English
- Genre: History
- Publisher: John Christie
- Publication date: 1906 (120 years ago)
- Publication place: United Kingdom
- Media type: Hardback book
- Pages: 232
- OCLC: 16463048

The Historians of Perth, and Other Local and Topographical Writers, Up to the End of the Nineteenth Century is a book by David Crawford Smith. It was published in 1906 by John Christie. It followed Smith's History of the Ancient Masonic Lodge of Scoon and Perth in 1898.

The book evaluates the work of 24 historians of Perth, Scotland, as well as other local and topographical writers, over 19 chapters: Henry Adamson, James Cant, Reverend James Scott, the Morison family (Francis, Robert Sr, James, Robert Jr, William and David), George Penny, Reverend Parker Lawson, Thomas Hay Marshall, David Peacock, P. R. Drummond, William Sievwright, Reverend William Marshall, Thomas Hunter, Robert Scott Fittis, Colin A. Hunt, Reverend Robert Milne, Reverend George T. S. Farquhar, Peter Baxter, James Bridges and Francis Buchanan White.

W. J. Hughan of Ars Quatuor Coronatorum reviewed the book in 1907.

Smith dedicated the book to "the sons and daughters of the city of Perth at home and abroad united in love for, and admiration of, the dear place of their nativity".
