= Glyptoscapus cicatricosus =

Scientific classification
- Kingdom: Animalia
- Phylum: Arthropoda
- Class: Insecta
- Order: Coleoptera
- Suborder: Polyphaga
- Infraorder: Cucujiformia
- Family: Cerambycidae
- Genus: Glyptoscapus
- Species: G. cicatricosus

Binomial name
- Glyptoscapus cicatricosus Aurivillius, 1899

Species of beetle

Glyptoscapus cicatricosus is a species of beetle in the family Cerambycidae. It was described by Per Olof Christopher Aurivillius in 1899.
