= David Peacock (author) =

Scottish author and historian

David Peacock (c. 1787 – 3 August 1853) was a Scottish journalist, editor, writer and historian. In 1849, he published the 632-page Perth: Its Annals and Archives, which is regarded as a comprehensive account of the history of Perth.

Born in Forfar, he moved to Perth "in the prime of his manhood", and lived there for over thirty years. He became known as a "highly esteemed, respectable, and useful citizen".

Shortly after arriving in Perth, he began working as the Precentor of the East Parish Church, while also filling the role of the music teacher in the Burgh Seminary. He led the choir at Blair Church when Queen Victoria visited the Duke of Atholl in 1842.

He also worked as a reporter for the Perth Courier and, later, the Constitutional, after it moved operations to Perth from Dundee. He succeeded George Buist as its editor.

In October 1847, Peacock retired from editing and was appointed to the Mastership of Perth's King James VI Hospital.

Two years later, he published Perth: Its Annals and Archives, which was printed by William Belford of the Perth Printing Company.

== Death ==
Peacock died on 3 August 1853, aged 65. He was interred in Perth's Wellshill Cemetery. His widow erected a monument in his memory.

== Bibliography ==
- Perth: Its Annals and Its Archives (Thomas Richardson, 1894)
