= Prior of Perth =

The Prior of Perth was the head of Perth Charterhouse, the Carthusian monastic house located near Perth. It was founded in 1429, and finally suppressed in 1602. The following is a list of priors and prior-commendators:

== List of priors and prior-commendators ==
=== List of priors ===
- Oswald de Corda, 1429-1434
- Adam Hangleside, 1434 x 1435-1441
- Laurence Hutton, 1442-1443
- Patrick Russell, 1443
- Michael Virey, 1444-1445
- Bryce Montgomery, 1445-1446
- Bryce Wych, 1446-1447
- Maurice Barry, 1447-1452
- Martin de Groether, 1452-1455
- James Bayne, 1456-1457
- Simon Fairlie, 1457-1465 x 1466
- Andrew Telfer, 1466-1471 x 1472
- Patrick Russell, 1472-1474 x 1475
- John Davidson, 1474 x 1475-1482 x 1486
- Richard Gaergen, 1482 x 1486
- David Simson, 1482 x 1486-1490 x 1492
- Walter Lyall, 1492-1495 x 1498
- John Ramsay, 1495 x 1498-1500 x 1501
- Alan (probably Alan Dawson), 1500 x 1501-1506 x 1507
- William Turnbull, 1507-1515 x 1517
- Hugh Moryn, 1515 x 1517-1535
- Alexander Inglis, 1535-1542 x 1543
- James Gordon, 1543-1543 x 1544
- Simon Galloway, 1543 x 1544-1544 x 1546
- Andrew Forman, 1544 x 1546-1552 x 1556
  - Simon Galloway (again), 1550-1554 x
- Adam Forman, 1552 x 1556-1567
- Adam Stewart, 1567 x 1569-1569

=== List of commendator-priors ===
- George Balfour, 1569-1588
- James Balfour of Cossertoun, 1588-1592 x 1599
- George Hay of Nether Liff, 1599-1602

== Bibliography ==
- Cowan, Ian B. & Easson, David E., Medieval Religious Houses: Scotland With an Appendix on the Houses in the Isle of Man, Second edition, (London, 1976), pp. 86-7
- Watt, D. E. R. & Shead, N. F. (eds.), The Heads of Religious Houses in Scotland from the 12th to the 16th Centuries, The Scottish Records Society, New Series, Volume 24, (Edinburgh, 2001), pp. 174-7
