= Glyptoscapus =

Scientific classification
- Kingdom: Animalia
- Phylum: Arthropoda
- Class: Insecta
- Order: Coleoptera
- Suborder: Polyphaga
- Infraorder: Cucujiformia
- Family: Cerambycidae
- Genus: Glyptoscapus

Genus of beetles

Glyptoscapus is a genus of beetles in the family Cerambycidae, containing the following species:

- Glyptoscapus bivittatus Gounelle, 1909
- Glyptoscapus cicatricosus Aurivillius, 1899
- Glyptoscapus flaveolus (Bates, 1870)
- Glyptoscapus pallidulus (White, 1855)
- Glyptoscapus vanettii Martins, 1959
