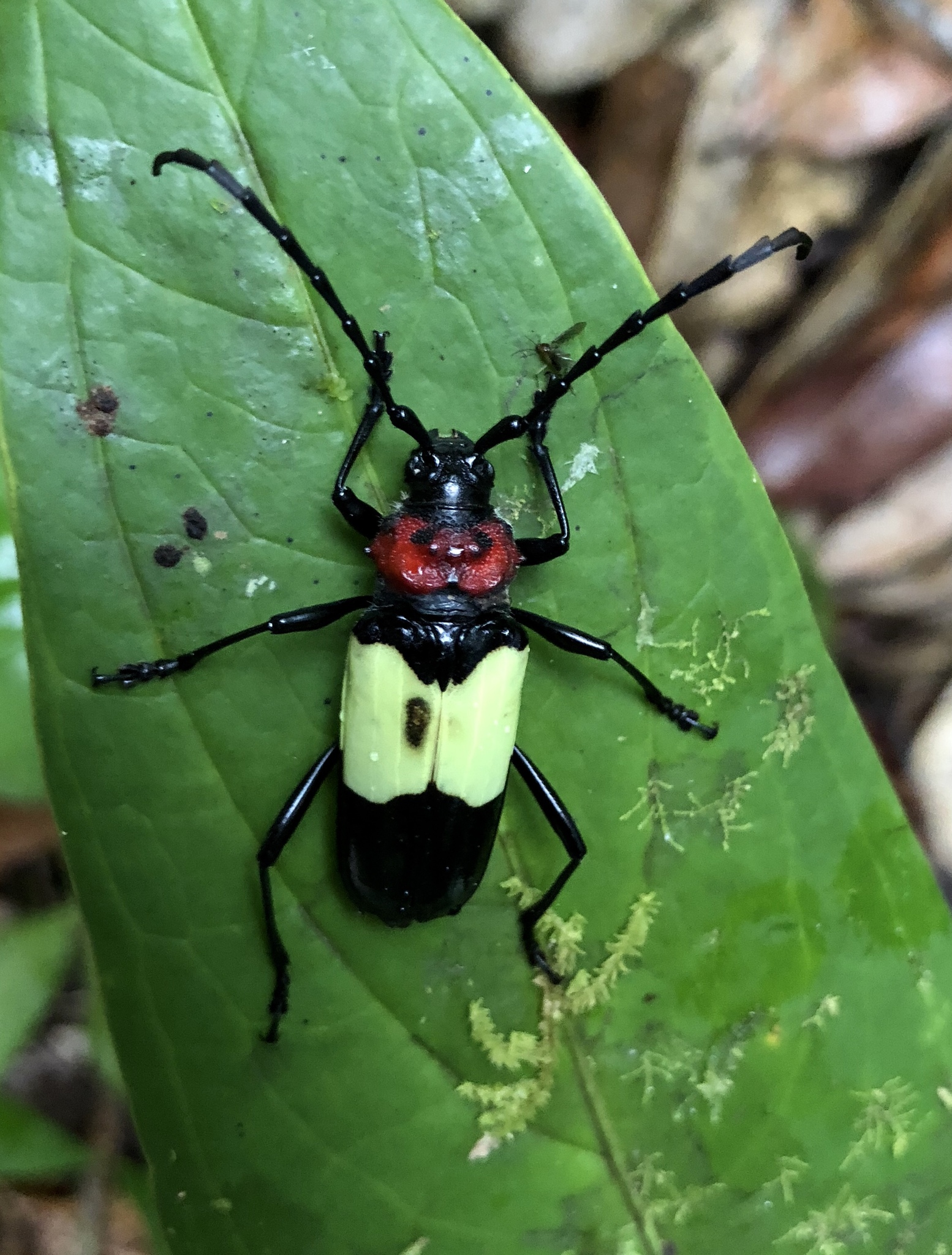

Scientific classification
- Domain: Eukaryota
- Kingdom: Animalia
- Phylum: Arthropoda
- Class: Insecta
- Order: Coleoptera
- Suborder: Polyphaga
- Infraorder: Cucujiformia
- Family: Cerambycidae
- Subfamily: Cerambycinae
- Tribe: Trachyderini
- Genus: Phaedinus; Dupont in Audinet-Serville, 1834

= Phaedinus =

Genus of beetles

Phaedinus is a genus of beetles in the family Cerambycidae, containing the following species:

- Phaedinus abnormalis Tippmann, 1953
- Phaedinus carbonelli Monné, 1999
- Phaedinus corallinus Gounelle, 1911
- Phaedinus flavipes (Thunberg, 1822)
- Phaedinus hirtipes Tippmann, 1960
- Phaedinus lanio Guérin-Méneville, 1838
- Phaedinus martii (Perty, 1832)
- Phaedinus pictus White, 1853
- Phaedinus rubrus Galileo & Martins, 2010
- Phaedinus schaufussi Nonfried, 1890
- Phaedinus tricolor Dupont in Audinet-Serville, 1834
