= Glyptoscapus vanettii =

Scientific classification
- Kingdom: Animalia
- Phylum: Arthropoda
- Class: Insecta
- Order: Coleoptera
- Suborder: Polyphaga
- Infraorder: Cucujiformia
- Family: Cerambycidae
- Genus: Glyptoscapus
- Species: G. vanettii

Binomial name
- Glyptoscapus vanettii Martins, 1959

Species of beetle

Glyptoscapus vanettii is a species of beetle in the family Cerambycidae. It was described by Martins in 1959.
