= Perth Charterhouse =

Monastic house of Carthusian monks in Perth, Scotland

Coordinates: 56.395°N 3.435°W

House of the Valley of Virtue, Perth
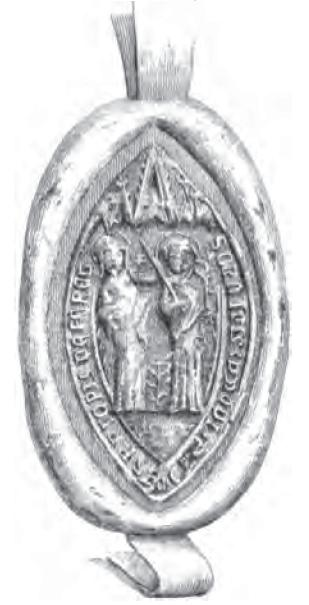

Monastery information
- Order: Carthusian
- Established: 1429
- Disestablished: 1569
- Mother house: Grande Chartreuse
- Diocese: N/A
- Controlled churches: Errol

People
- Founder(s): James I of Scotland

Perth Charterhouse or Perth Priory, known in Latin as Domus Vallis Virtutis ("House of the Valley of Virtue"), was a monastic house of Carthusian monks based at Perth, Scotland. It was the only Carthusian house ever to be established in the Kingdom of Scotland, and one of the last non-mendicant houses to be founded in the kingdom. The traditional founding date of the house is 1429. Formal suppression of the house came in 1569, though this was not actualised until 1602.

King James VI Hospital now occupies the Priory's former location.

== Carthusian Order ==
The Carthusian Order has its origin in the 11th century at La Grande Chartreuse in the Alps; Carthusian houses are small, and limited in number. Carrying the motto "Never reformed because never deformed", the Carthusians are the most ascetic and austere of all the European monastic orders, and the Order is regarded as the pinnacle of religious devotion to which monks from other orders are attracted when they were in need of greater spiritual challenges. In the first half of the 15th century, the Order experienced a renewal of secular patronage, including an attempted foundation by Archibald Douglas, 4th Earl of Douglas, in 1419.

== Foundation ==
The traditional founding date of the house is 1429. However, it was three years earlier, on 19 August 1426, that the Prior of La Grande Chartreuse, having received the consent of the General Chapter of the Carthusian Order, authorised the foundation of a house at Perth. King James used much of his own revenue as well as part of the ransom payment owed to the English crown, to begin work on the new house, as well as pressurising others to make grants; the Cistercian monk John of Bute was given responsibility for overseeing the construction of the priory. The priory may have been intended as a royal mausoleum, and King James I of Scotland (reigned 1424-1437), his queen Joan Beaufort (c.1404-1445) and queen Margaret Tudor (1489-1541), widow of James IV, were buried there. The first Prior of Perth, Oswald de Corda, was in office by 31 March 1429. Oswald was a Bavarian who served as vicar of the Grande Chartreuse; while there, he wrote a treatise on textual emendation.

== Property ==
The monastery was founded at the instigation of King James, who on 31 March 1429, granted the proposed house a series of privileges. Coupar Angus Abbey and William Hay of Errol gave, "through fear" it was said by his grandson, the church of Errol in Gowrie; Coupar Angus had been the former rector and Hay the patron of the church of Errol, and both the abbey and the Hays of Errol tried to recover their rights after James I's death. There were also grants from Perth burgesses, perhaps under the same pressure. By 1434, the priory had control of the Hospital of St Mary Magdalene and the house of Augustinian canonesses of St Leonard, near Perth, which was suppressed in 1438 and its revenues transferred to the Charterhouse. The king also had plans to take Glen Dochart from the Earl of Atholl and give it to the house.

== Royal mausoleum ==
King James considered the Carthusians to be a good model to inspire ecclesiastical reform in Scotland. His building work at the Perth Charterhouse was managed by Brother John of Bute. James is known to have employed a glazier from Florence, Francesco Domenico Livi de Gambassi, for the stained glass in his church building projects. Payments for glass for the Charterhouse were made in 1435. James intended the Perth Charterhouse to be his mausoleum, and after his death, payments were made for his tomb and its subsequent embellishment and upkeep. His consort Joan Beaufort was buried beside him in 1445. The Charterhouse acquired James I's doublet, which was shown to visitors as a relic with the holes made by the assassin's daggers.

== Development ==
The model house of the Carthusian Order was one prior and twelve brothers, following the example of Jesus Christ and his twelve apostles. It is likely therefore that the community of Perth Charterhouse usually consisted of this; however, a document from 1478 shows that at that time it consisted of a prior, fourteen choir-monks, two lay brothers and one novice. This was probably an aberration, and by 1529 the house was back down to the standard size. By 1558 there were only ten brothers.

As the house was the only Carthusian establishment in Scotland, Perth's place in the international Carthusian system was awkward. It was part of the Carthusian province of Picardy; between 1456 and 1460 it was part of the English province, but it was placed in the province of Geneva thereafter.

== Reformation and dissolution ==
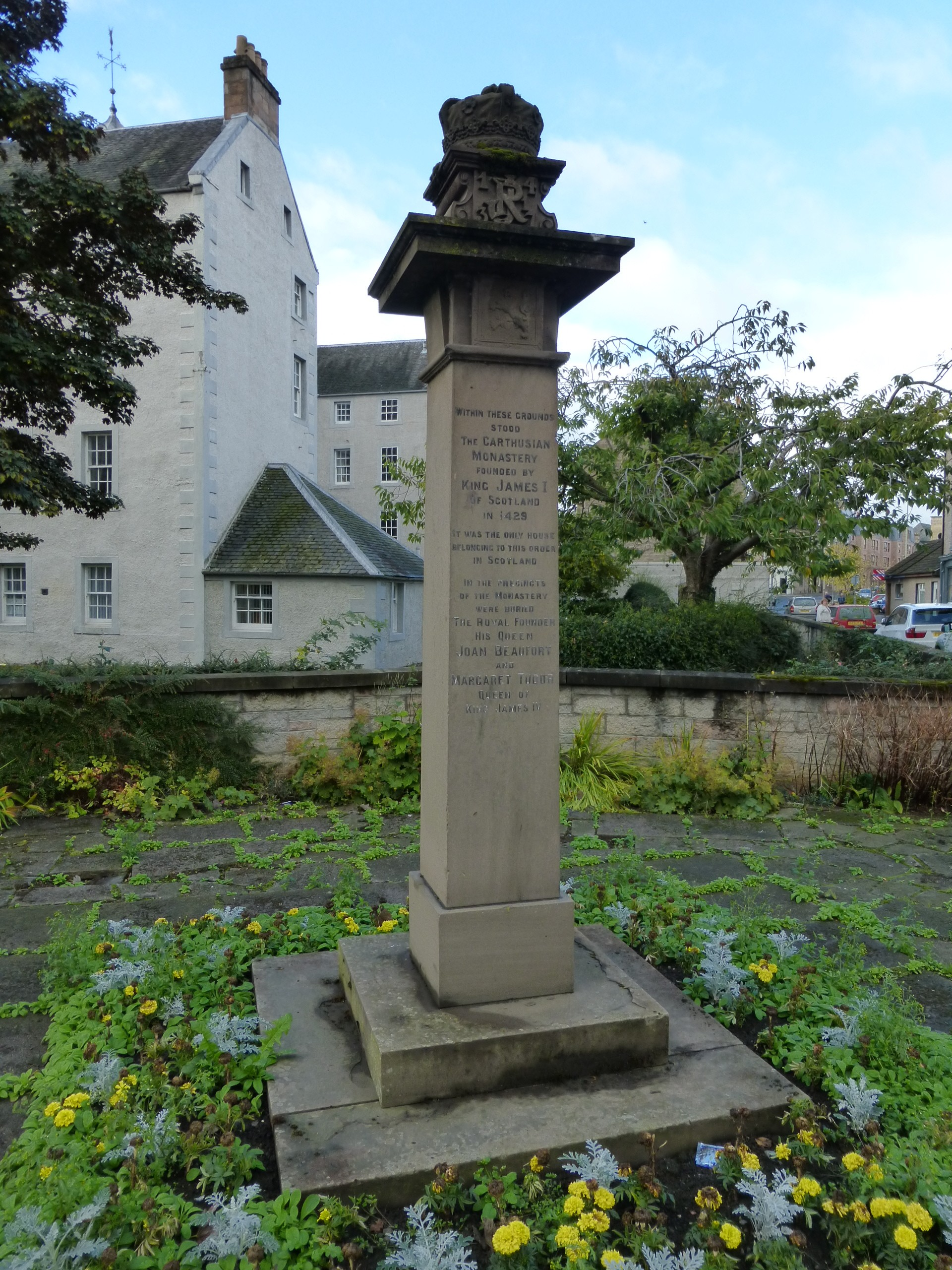
A monument now marks the site of the Charterhouse

On 11 May 1559, the Charterhouse and the other religious houses of Perth were attacked and destroyed by Protestant "reformers"; one of the brothers was killed, four others fled abroad, while six monks chose to remain; two of those, the prior Adam Forman and a brother, fled in to foreign Carthusian houses in 1567. Of the four who remained in 1567, one was Adam Stewart, illegitimate son of King James V of Scotland, who for some time styled himself "Prior". King James VI of Scotland granted the buildings and the gardens of the house to the burgh of Perth on 9 August 1569, though the house remained in notional operation, being held by commendators until 1602. The final suppression of the monastery in that year probably relates to the reissuing of King James VI's 1569 charter in 1600.

Of the Priory buildings, said to be 'of wondrous cost and greatness', nothing survives above ground. Excavations have failed to identify the exact location. The name Pomarium Street, for modern housing near the site of the medieval buildings, recalls the site of the house's orchard, which seems to have survived into the 18th century. Perth bus station now occupies part of Pomarium Street.

== Burials ==
- James I of Scotland (1394–1437).
- Joan Beaufort, Queen of Scots (c.1404–1445)
- Margaret Tudor, Queen of Scots (1489–1541).

The stone slab which covered the tomb of James and his queen can be seen in St John's Kirk.

== See also ==
- Prior of Perth, for a list of priors and commendators
- Adam of Dryburgh
- Bruno of Cologne
- Witham Friary
