= Magnus Jackson =

Scottish landscape photographer

- Born: 25 September 1831
- Died: 27 April 1891 (aged 59); Perth, Scotland
- Resting place: Wellshill Cemetery, Perth, Scotland
- Known for: Photography

Magnus Jackson (25 September 1831 – 27 April 1891) was a Scottish landscape photographer from Perth. He was noted for his use of the collodion process in developing his photographic film. He left around 2,500 glass photographic negatives taken in Perth and the surrounding area between the late 1850s and 1890. These are now on permanent display at Perth Museum and Art Gallery.

In 2017, Perth Museum and Art Gallery exhibited Jackson's work over four months. The exhibition featured a projected silhouette of Jackson describing, in his own words, the challenge of using wet-plate collodion photography.

== Early life ==
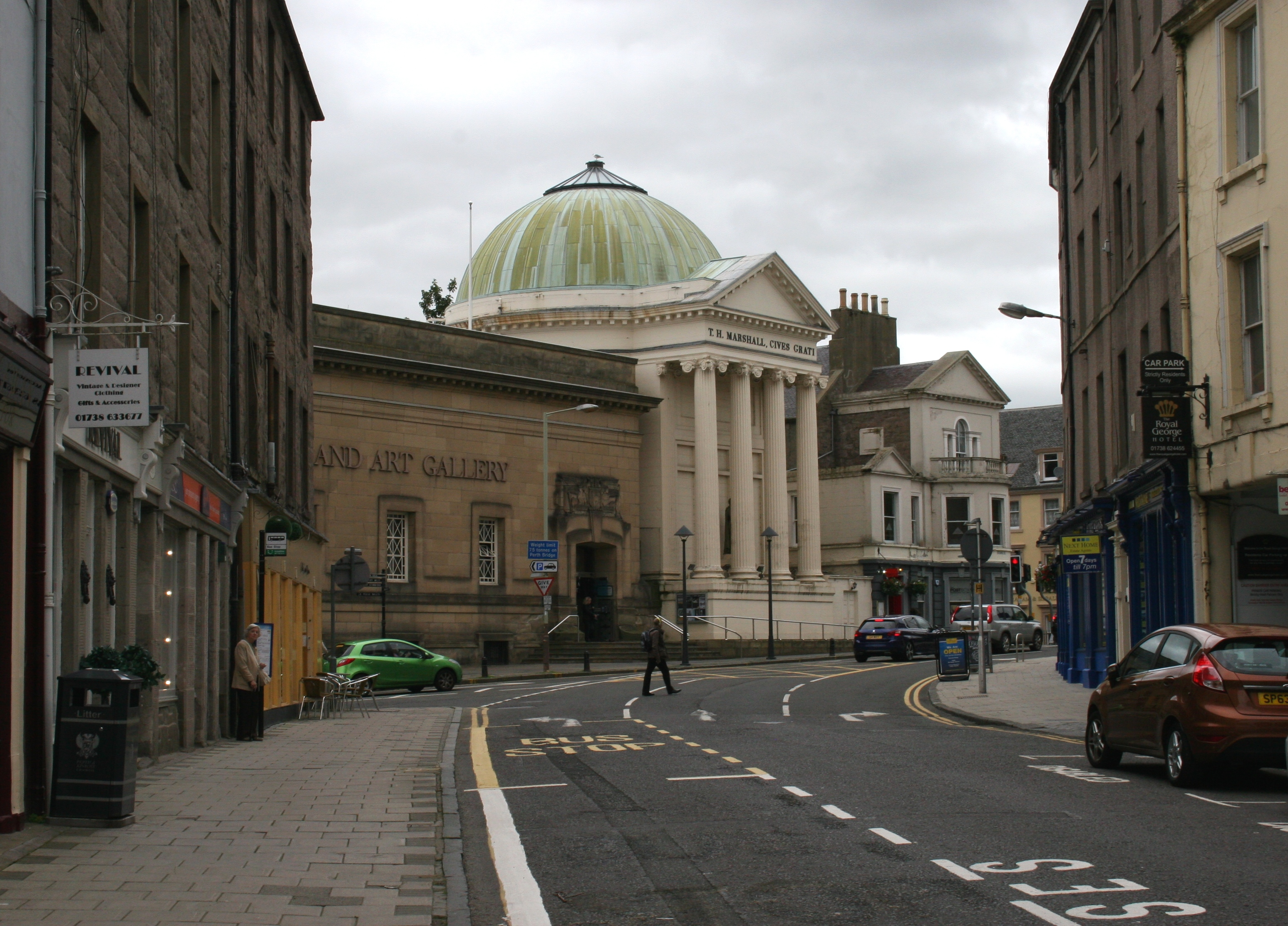
Jackson grew up at the rear of today's 70 George Street, the last building on the left before Bridge Lane here. Only the Thomas Hay Marshall monument section of Perth Museum existed at the time, having been constructed seven years before his birth

Jackson was born in 1831, to Thomas Jackson and Helen Miller, one of their six children (three sons and three daughters). His father was a picture-frame maker, looking glass manufacturer, a restorer of oil paintings and a print seller. His business was at 70 George Street. The family home was at 3 Bridge Lane, at the rear of the business. His eldest son, James, took over the business in the late 1840s. Magnus, in turn, inherited the business from his brother. He continued to run the carving and gilding business alongside his career as a photographer up until his death.

In the early 1850s, Jackson took lessons in wet-plate collodion photography in London. After three years in the capital, he returned to Perth, where he established his own photography business in a wooden studio in Marshall Place, on the site of today's St Leonard's-in-the-Fields Church, overlooking the city's South Inch.

== Career ==
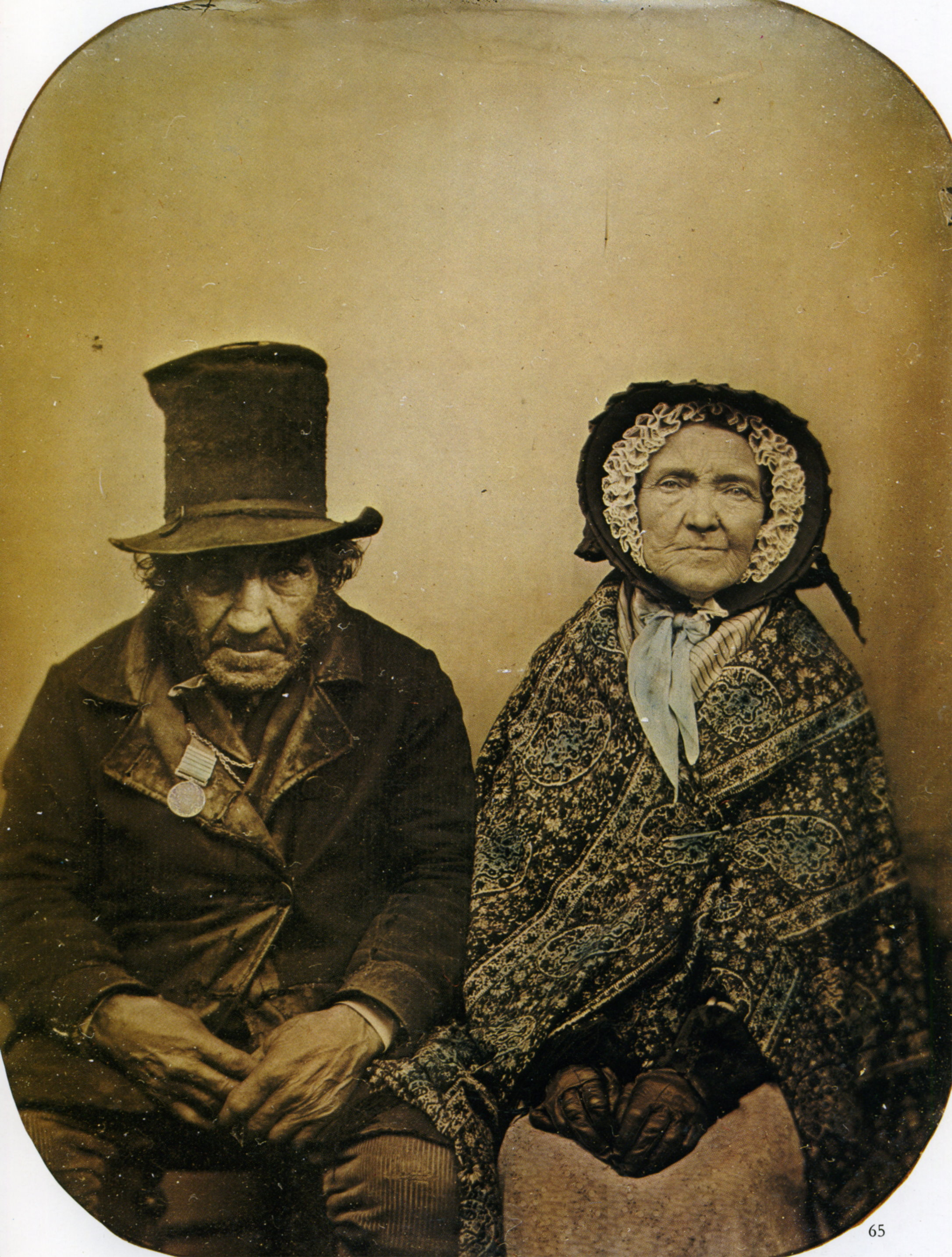
An example of the wet-plate collodion technique: Anonymous "A Veteran with his Wife", ambrotype

By 1884, his success was at its peak, allowing him the funds to construct new premises at 62 Princes Street, a few yards to the north, adjacent to Greyfriars Burial Ground. The same year, he was awarded a medal at the International Forestry Exhibition in Edinburgh.

In 1886, he was awarded the bronze medal and diploma of merit at the International Exhibition of Industry, Science and Art in Edinburgh for his photographs of ferns and foxgloves.

When his health began to fail, in the late 1880s, his sons, Thomas and Magnus Jr, took over the business. They used the trade name T. & M. Jackson from 1891. Magnus Jr was working alone by 1893, and he continued until around 1898, when he committed suicide. The business folded at that point, and the premises were taken over by Burrows Brothers photographers.

== Personal life ==
Jackson married Jessie Christie in December 1859. They lived in Bridge Lane, but as their financial situation improved they moved, firstly in December 1870, to 30 James Street, then to 59 Scott Street. The couple had three children: sons Thomas (1861) and Magnus (1865) and, between them, daughter Catherine Stewart (1863). Each of them received photography training from their father. In 1897, Thomas emigrated to South Africa, where he continued to be a photographer. He married Adelaide Sarah Grove, a Londoner. He died in Colesberg, South Africa, in 1940, aged 78.

In 1877, Jackson was elected a member of the Perthshire Society of Natural Science (PSNS), a decade after its formation. The following year, he was elected to Perth's town council.

In 1879, he was part of a committee charged with building the Perthshire Society of Natural Science Museum at today's 62–72 Tay Street. He was elected to the council of PSNS the following year, elevating to vice-president between 1882 and 1884. In the middle of this tenure, he exhibited his work A piece of larch from a tree which had been struck by lightning.

He was appointed Police Commissioner for Perth in 1885, under the General Police and Improvement (Scotland) Act 1862 (25 & 26 Vict. c. 101). His role was to oversee the police department, street lighting and fire services.

By the last decade of his life, Jackson was on the council of the Society of Antiquaries of Scotland.

A supporter of the Literary and Antiquarian Society of Perth, he bequeathed a brass candlestick to their collection. It was reportedly given to one of his ancestors, Magnus the Miller, by William Wallace. It is in the collections of Perth Museum and Art Gallery.

In 1887, he was a part of a committee that dealt with a boat carrying victims of cholera, and found a safe mooring place on the Tay that allowed the facilitation of treatment for and isolation of the patients.

Two years before his death, in May 1889 he officially opened Perth's public swimming baths on Dunkeld Road. His wife, Jessie, died two months later, in July.

== Death ==
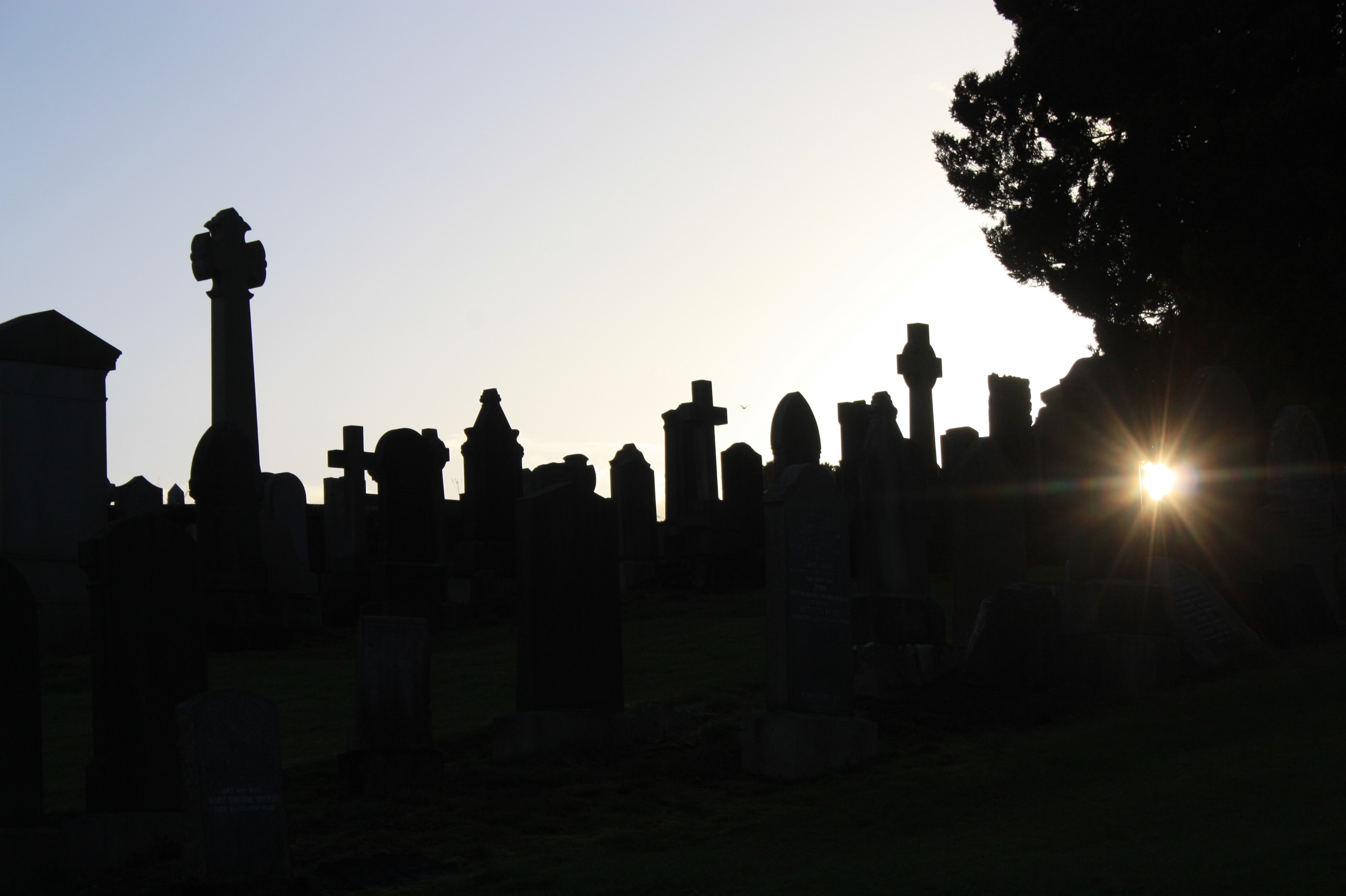
Jackson's resting place, Wellshill Cemetery

Jackson died in 1891, aged 59. His death was not unexpected, his having been ill for several years. His causes of death were given as "senile decay, chronic hepatitis, acute dyspepsia and inanition".

In his newspaper obituary, the Perthshire Constitutional noted that he was "known across Scotland as a first-rate landscape photographer".

Jackson and his wife are interred in Perth's Wellshill Cemetery.

== Publication ==
- Photography Outside the Studio (1881) – published in two parts in both The Photographic News and the British Journal of Photography
