= A. K. Bell Library =

County building in Perth, Scotland

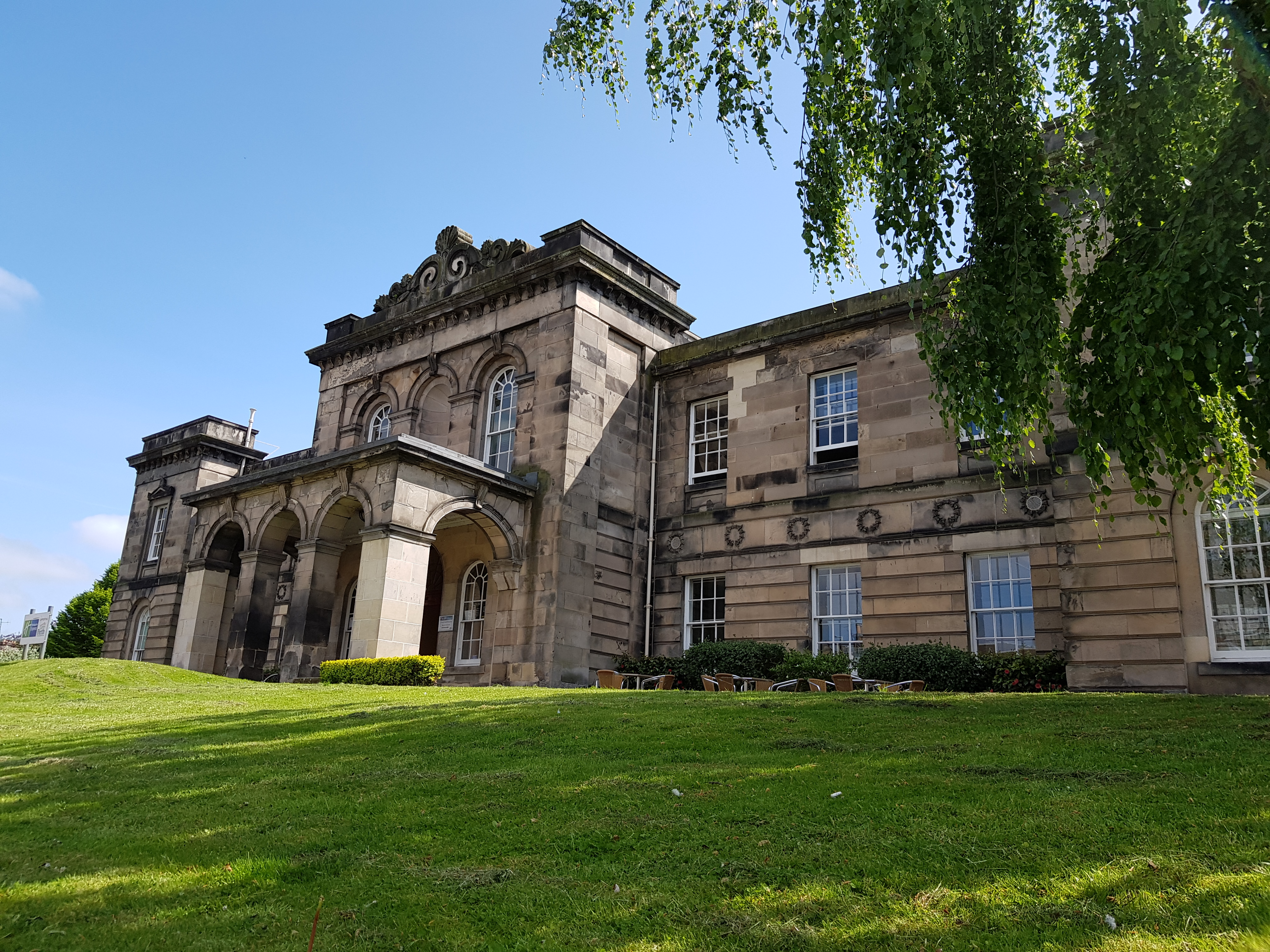
- Main façade, 2018
- Interactive map of the A. K. Bell Library area

General information
- Location: 2–8 York Place; Perth, Perth and Kinross, Scotland
- Coordinates: 56°23′43″N 3°26′15″W
- Current tenants: A. K. Library
- Named for: Arthur Kinmond Bell
- Construction started: 1834
- Completed: 1838 (188 years ago)

Design and construction
- Architect: William Mackenzie

Other information
- Public transit: Perth

Website
- www.culturepk.org.uk/your-local-library/ak-bell-library/

Listed Building – Category A
- Official name: York Place, A K Bell Library including Boundary Wall to York Place
- Designated: 20 May 1965
- Reference no.: LB39323

The A. K. Bell Library is an historic building on York Place in Perth, Perth and Kinross, Scotland. The building was originally a hospital before becoming a municipal building and later a library. The central section of the building is Category A listed. The lodge to the estate, now removed from its original location, is Category B listed.

== History ==
The building, situated on the western outskirts of the city centre, was originally commissioned as a hospital and was made possible by a gift of £1,000. The foundation stone was laid by Lord Kinnaird in 1836. It was designed by William Mackenzie in the neoclassical style, built in ashlar stone was officially opened as the County and City Infirmary on 1 October 1838. The design involved a symmetrical main frontage with eleven bays facing onto York Place with the end bays projected forward; the central section of three bays, which also projected forward, featured a large porte-cochère with a central niche flanked by two round headed windows. At roof level there was a dentilled cornice, a parapet and a stone decoration in the form of a scroll surmounted by a seashell. The other bays were fenestrated by sash windows. Patients with infectious diseases were admitted to the wings from 1891. The building was vacated when the Perth Royal Infirmary opened on Glasgow Road in 1914, and the former County and City Infirmary was then used as a British Red Cross Voluntary Aid Detachment Hospital, where service personnel who had been wounded on the Western Front were treated.

The building was acquired by the Perthshire Education Authority in 1920 and, following the implementation of the Local Government (Scotland) Act 1929, the administration of the county of Perthshire and of the neighbouring county of Kinross-shire were combined under a joint council based at the former hospital building in York Place which became known as the "County Offices".

Following the implementation of the Local Government (Scotland) Act 1973, the joint council was abolished and a two tier system was introduced with many of the council officers either joining Perth and Kinross District Council or Tayside Regional Council. After Perth and Kinross District Council opened new offices at 2 High Street, the building closed completely as a municipal facility in 1985.

The building was extensively modernised as part of a programme to convert it into a library between 1992 and 1995. The works, which were carried out by Mowlem, involved modern wing extensions and well as an extension to the rear. The cost of conversion was £6 million and the library was named after the former partner in the Bell's whisky business, Arthur Kinmond Bell, who had been a significant benefactor to the town; the trust fund he had established was also a major contributor to the new library. It was officially opened by the Duke of Rothesay on 13 January 1995. He was presented with a leather-bound, second-edition copy of W. H. Findlay's 1984 book Heritage of Perth. Meanwhile, the lodge, which was built in 1836, was moved from its original location to 4 York Place. It was reconstructed by another local architect, David Smart, in 1867, and was converted for use as the home of the Perth and Kinross Archives. Derelict and threatened with demolition, the lodge was purchased and restored, with assistance from Historic Scotland, by Perth and Kinross Heritage Trust in 2000.

Works of art in the library include a large oil painting in the foyer by the local artist, Dan Stephen, named "Reconstruction".

== Photographic collection ==
A notable resource at the library is the photographic collection of W. H. Findlay. The collection contains over 6,000 images of Perth, around a quarter of the total Findlay took over the course of fifty years. The rest of his collection is in the archives of the Perthshire Society of Natural Science.

The library also holds two albums of Magnus Jackson's tree photographs.

== Sandeman collection ==
Upon the closure of the nearby Sandeman Library in 1995, its collection of books was moved to this location and can now be found in the Sandeman Room.

== Gallery ==
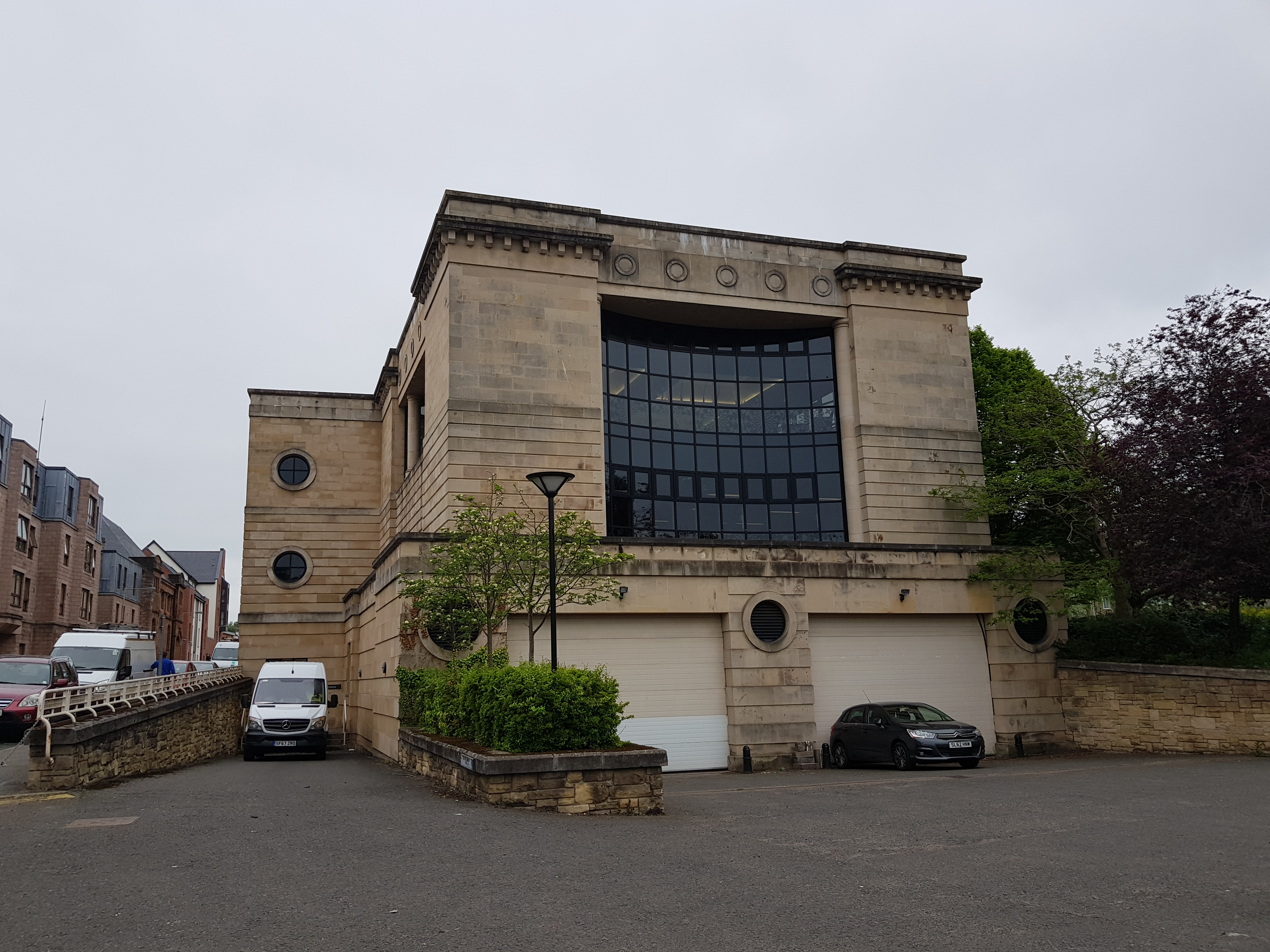
East elevation

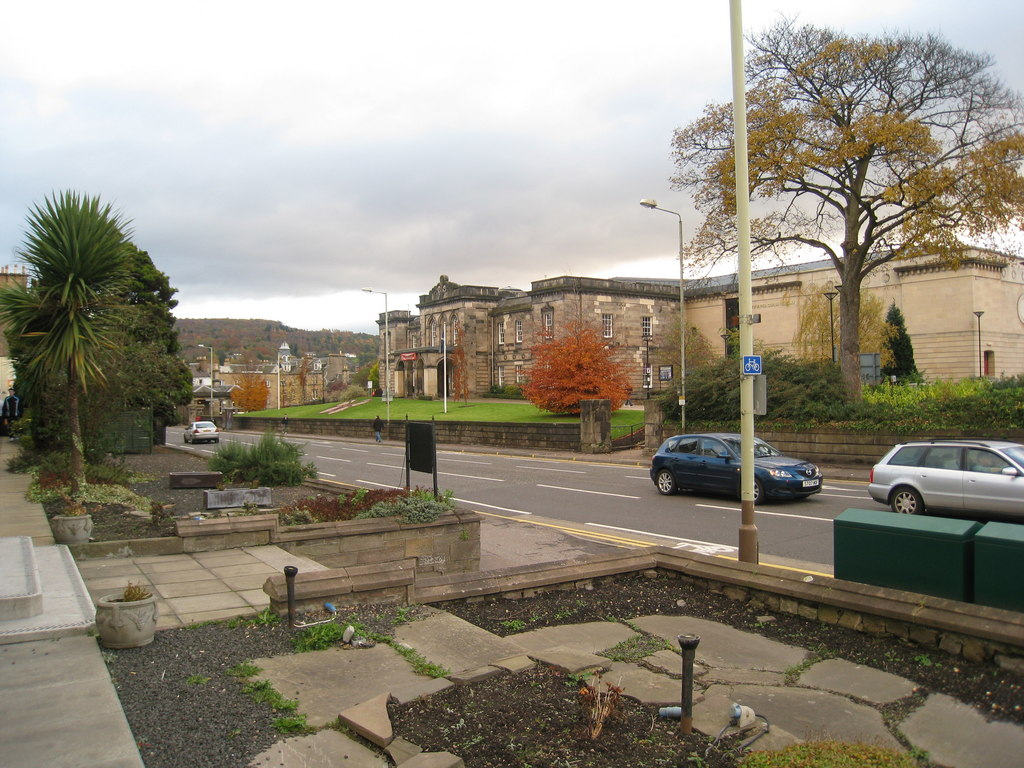
Another view from the front

== See also ==
- List of Category A listed buildings in Perth and Kinross
- List of listed buildings in Perth, Perth and Kinross
