= Wellshill Cemetery =

Cemetery in Perth, Scotland

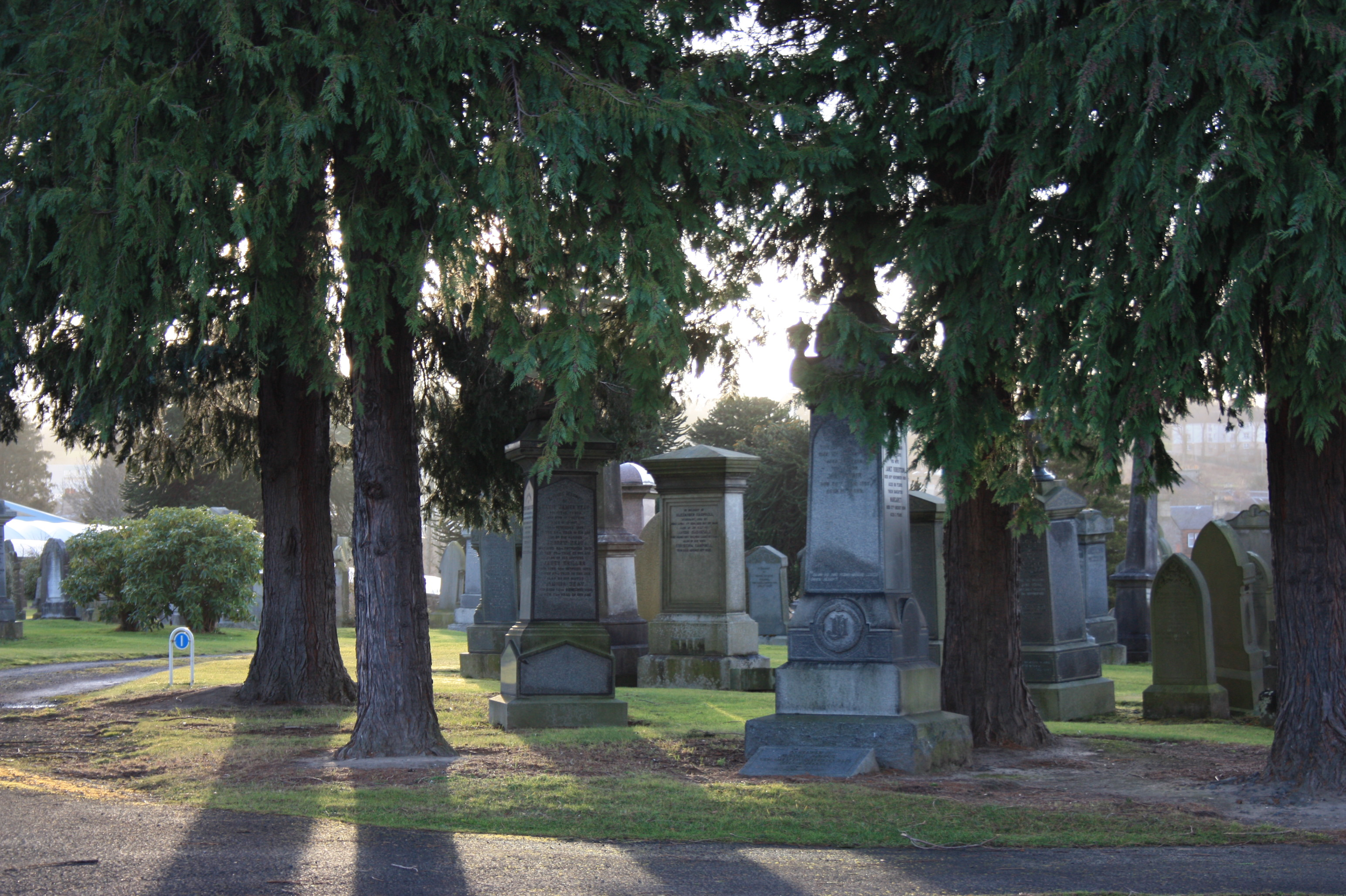
- The central roundel
- Interactive map of Wellshill Cemetery

Details
- Established: 1844 (182 years ago)
- Location: Feus Road; Perth, Scotland
- Country: United Kingdom
- Coordinates: 56.4001°N 3.4494°W
- Owned by: Perth and Kinross Council
- Find a Grave: Wellshill Cemetery

Wellshill Cemetery is a 19th-century cemetery in the Scottish city of Perth, Perth and Kinross. Located on Feus Road, the cemetery is still operational and is under the control of Perth and Kinross Council.

== History ==
The cemetery was opened in 1844 as a private cemetery. The original section and original entrance gates lie to the south-east. A parochial (free section) was added to the north around 1860 and further private sections added to the west (now the centre) and far north. A modern section was added by the Council on former Jeanfield recreation ground to the west, and is known as Jeanfield Cemetery. A wall exists between the two cemeteries but the wall has a gap at each end for mutual access.

Modern access is from the south-west on Jeanfield Road. The feature nearest the modern entrance is the monument and attached graves of the 381 Polish pilots who died serving Britain during the Second World War. There are over 90 Commonwealth service personnel and one Belgian soldier buried in the cemetery from the First World War and over 120 Commonwealth personnel from the Second. The cemetery contains a total 575 war graves, maintained by the Commonwealth War Graves Commission, of persons who died of wounds, mainly at Perth Royal Infirmary, and other causes.

The Polish code-breaker Lieutenant Colonel Gwido Langer was also originally buried here in 1948, as a Polish Signal Corps grave within the Polish war graves, but his body was exhumed in 2010 for reburial in Poland with full military honours.

== Notable interments ==
- Memorial to Lord Cameron, Neil Cameron, Baron Cameron of Balhousie (1920–1985), commander of the RAF
- Magnus Jackson (1831–1891), photographer
- John Sturgeon Mackay FRSE (1843–1914), mathematician
- Robert MacGregor Mitchell, Lord MacGregor Mitchell (1875–1938)
- David Peacock (c. 1787–1853), author and historian
- James Pullar (1835–1912) of Pullars of Perth, first person to use modern dry-cleaning methods in Scotland (1867)
- John Pullar (1803–1878), founder of Pullars of Perth, Lord Provost of Perth
- Sir Robert Pullar FRSE (1828–1912) of Pullars of Perth, MP for Perth
- John Murray Robertson (1844–1901), architect
- Very Rev Vincent Rorison (1851–1910), Dean of St Andrews
- Sgt. Alexander Thompson VC (1824–1880), recipient of the Victoria Cross
- Robert de Bruce Trotter (1834–1907), author
- Bill Wilkie (1922–2017), musician

The only grave of note (apart from war graves) in the Jeanfield section is the poet William Soutar (1898–1943).

== Gallery ==
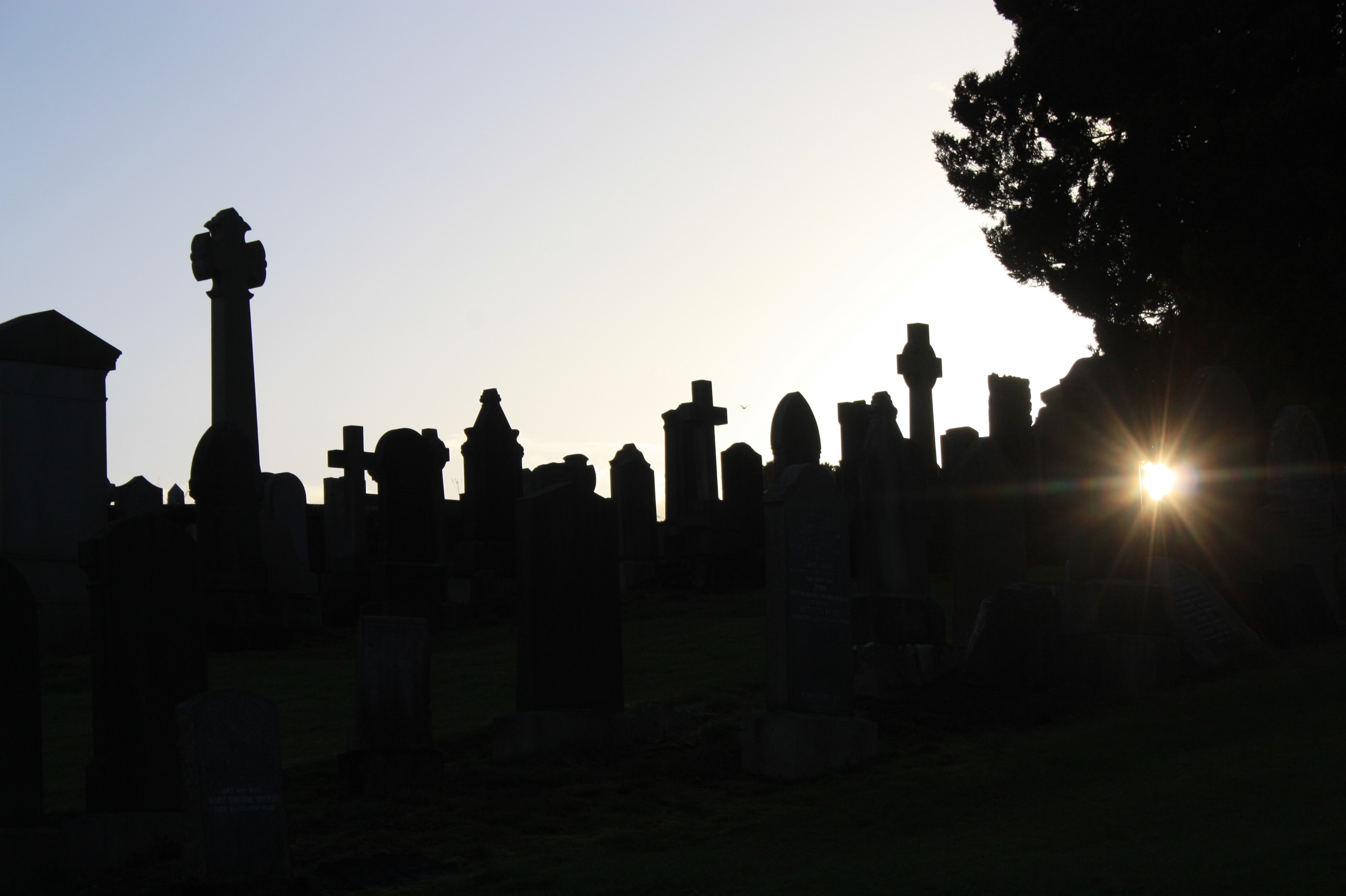
Silhouetted stones at sunset

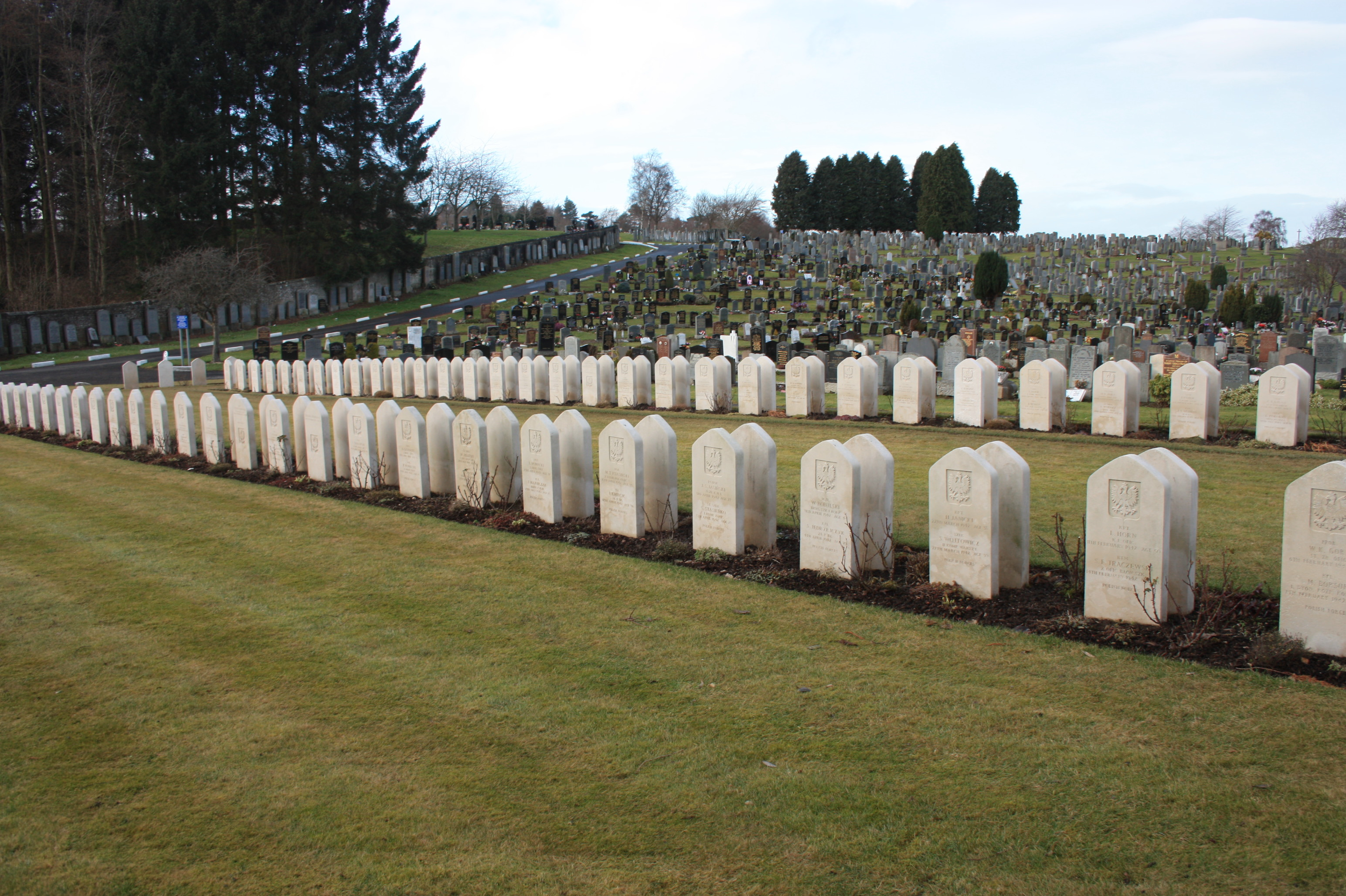
The grave of the Polish pilots from World War II

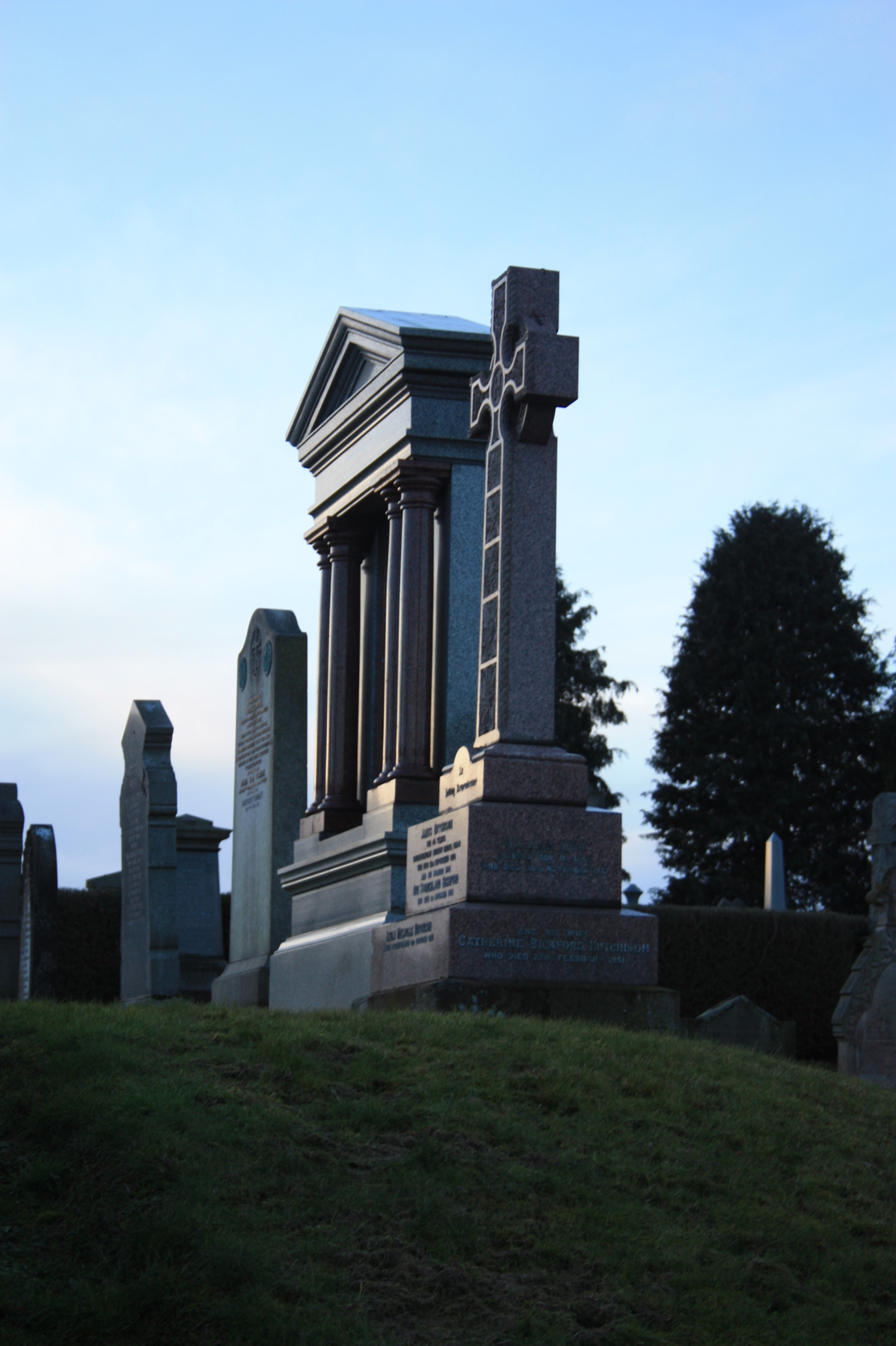
Monuments
