= King James VI Hospital =

Hospital building in Perth and Kinross, Scotland

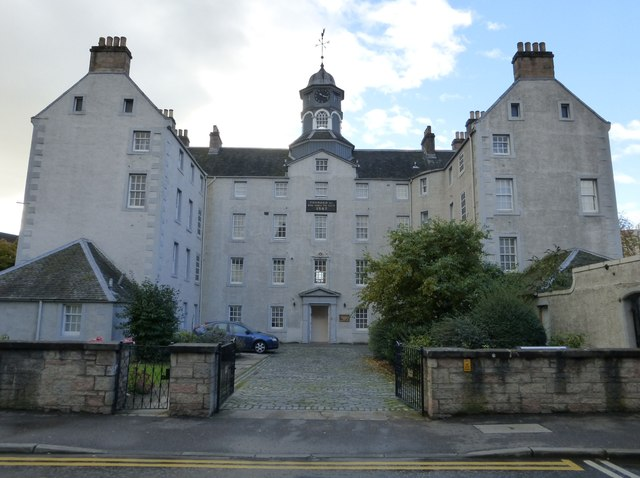
- The building's main facade in 2013

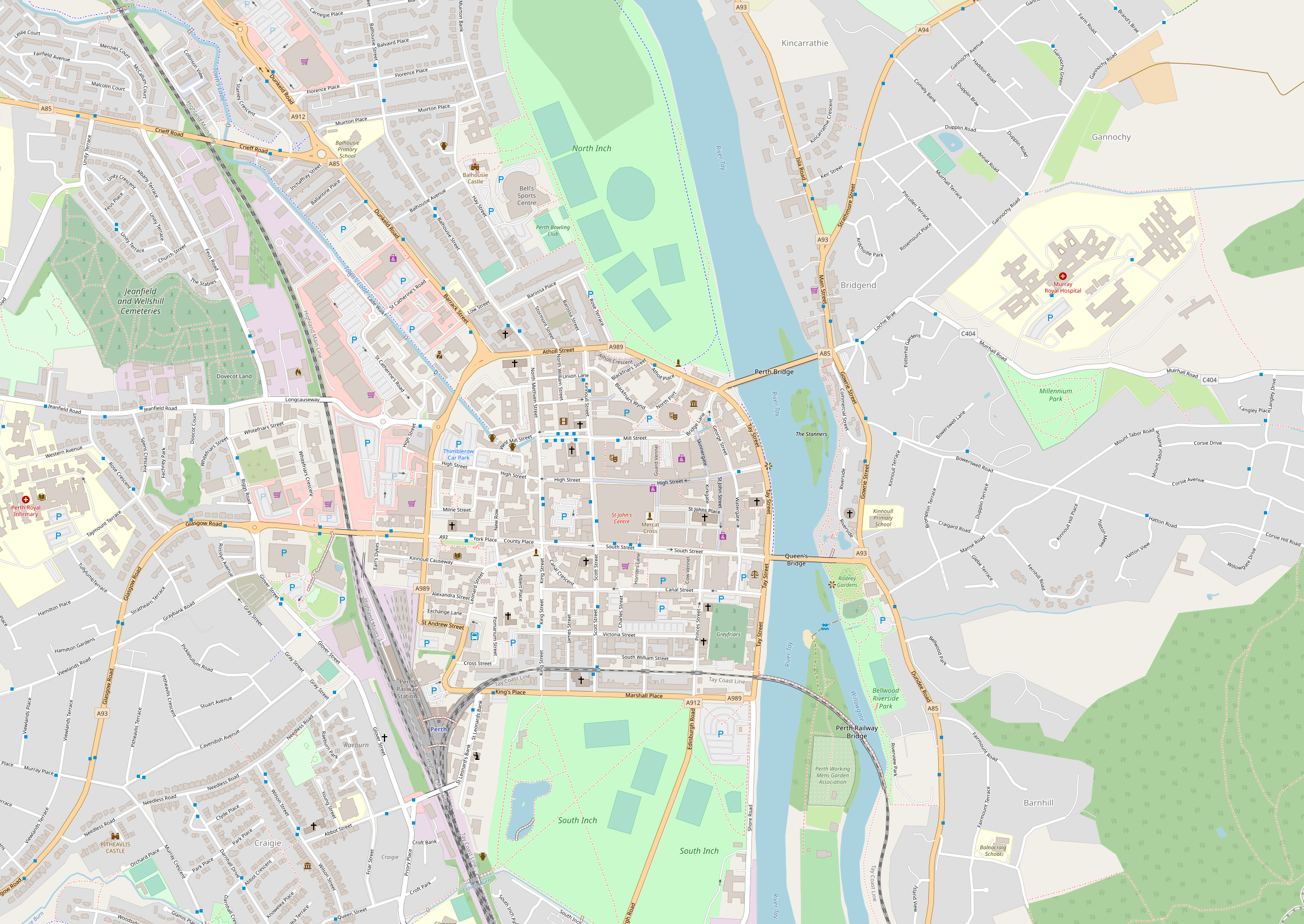
- Shown in Perth
- 56.3948°N 3.4348°W
- Location: Hospital Street, Perth, Scotland

History
- Built: 1750 (276 years ago)

Site notes
- Architect: James Cree
- Architectural style: Georgian

Listed Building – Category A
- Designated: 20 May 1965
- Reference no.: LB39319

King James VI Hospital is an historic building in Perth, Scotland. Located on Hospital Street, it is a Category A listed building, built in 1750. It stands on the former site of Perth Priory (1429), which was burned in 1559 during the Reformation. Of the Priory buildings, said to be "of wondrous cost and greatness," nothing survives above ground. Excavations have failed to identify the exact location. The name Pomarium Street, for modern housing near the site of the medieval buildings, recalls the site of the house's orchard, which seems to have survived into the 18th century.

An H-shaped building, four storeys high, it is finished in greywash harled rubble "with raised ashlar margins and quoins at angles". The central block is topped by an octagonal belfry believed to have been taken from Nairne House, in Bankfoot, which was demolished in 1748 after being forfeited during the 1745 Jacobite Rebellion.

The building was funded by royal endowment and public subscription, and it served several functions, including being an almshouse, an industrial school and an infirmary, as well as being a reformatory for delinquents. The building was shaped in an "H" to maximise the supervision of its occupants by a minimal amount of staff. In 1814, most of the building was rented out for other uses, and in 1838, a separate infirmary was built 500 feet to the west, on York Place (now occupied by A. K. Bell Library).

The building was renovated and restored in 1976 and has 21 residential flats within its modified interior. The hospital boardroom was maintained.

== Monument ==
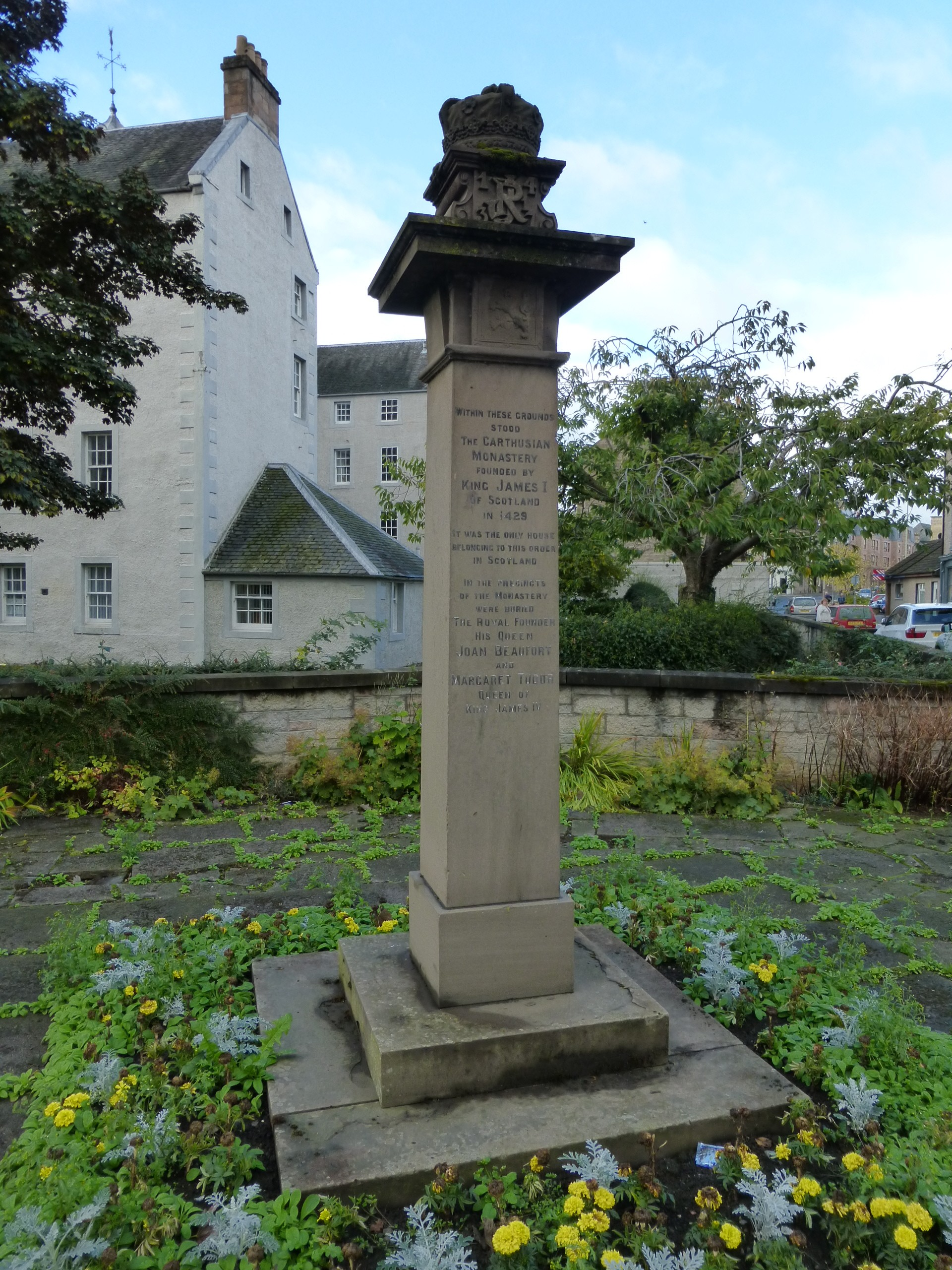
A monument, at the Hospital Street and King Street (northeastern) corner of the property, marks the former site of the Priory

== See also ==
- List of Category A listed buildings in Perth and Kinross
- List of listed buildings in Perth, Scotland
