= Francis Buchanan White =

Scottish entomologist and botanist (1842–1894)

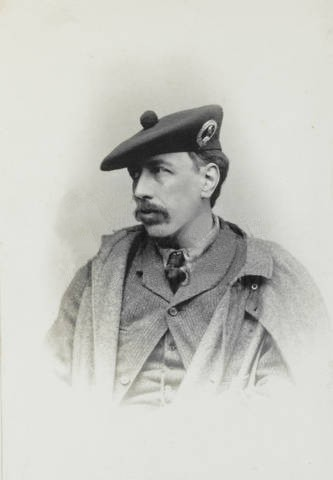
Francis Buchanan White

Francis Buchanan White (20 March 1842 – 3 December 1894) was a Scottish entomologist and botanist. He was one of the founders of the Perthshire Natural History Museum.

Born in Perth, Scotland, White was the eldest son of Francis I. White and attended a school attached to St Ninian's Cathedral. He was also educated by a private tutor. From 1860 onward he studied medicine at the University of Edinburgh, graduating with an M.D. in 1864. After doing a Grand Tour in 1866 along with his newly wed wife Margaret Juliet Corrie of Stielston, he settled in Perth, where he remained his entire life. In 1867 he joined others to establish the Perthshire Society of Natural Science. His main area of interest was the Lepidoptera and the taxonomy of the Hemiptera. He was the author of numerous scientific papers, published in the Scottish Naturalist, Journal of Botany, British and Foreign, and The Proceedings and Transactions of the Perthshire Society of Natural Science. White was elected in 1868, a Fellow of the Royal Entomological Society and in 1873 a Fellow of the Linnean Society.

In 1883, Buchanan White redescribed the known species of the Hemiptera genus Halobates and he illustrated 11 species in colour, with numerous drawings in black and white of structural details. This was one of the parts of the Challenger Report. He also worked on the taxonomy of the willows.

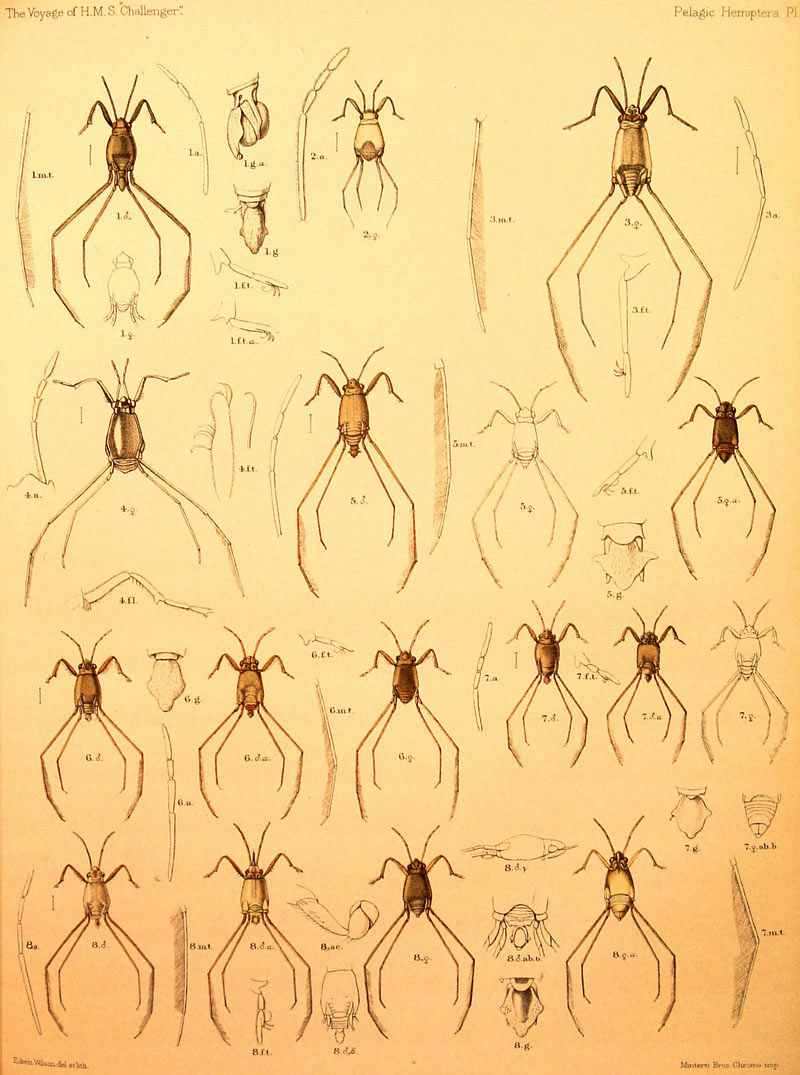
Halobates plate from the Challenger Report, 1883

== Selected publications ==
- White, F. Buchanan (1877). "Descriptions of new species of heteropterous Hemiptera collected in the Hawaiian Islands by the Rev. T. Blackburn. No. 1". The Annals and Magazine of Natural History. ser. 4. 20 (116): 110–114. doi:10.1080/00222937708682204. (See Thomas Blackburn (entomologist).)
- White, F. Buchanan (1878). "Descriptions of new species of heteropterous Hemiptera collected in the Hawaiian Islands by the Rev. T. Blackburn. No. 2". The Annals and Magazine of Natural History. ser. 5. 1 (5): 365–374. doi:10.1080/00222937808682346.
- White, F. Buchanan (1881). "Descriptions of new species of heteropterous Hemiptera collected in the Hawaiian Islands by the Rev. T. Blackburn. No. 3". The Annals and Magazine of Natural History. ser. 5. 7 (37): 52–59. doi:10.1080/00222938109459472.
- "Description of new Anthocoridae". Entomologist's Monthly Magazine. 16: 142–148. November 1879.
- "A Revision of the British Willows". The Journal of the Linnean Society. 27: 333–457. 1891.
- with J. W. H. Trail: White, Francis Buchanan; Trail, James William Helenus (1898). The Flora of Perthshire.

== Sources ==
- Desmond, Ray (1994). Dictionary of British and Irish Botanists and Horticulturists Including plant collectors, flower painters and garden designers. London: Taylor & Francis / The Natural History Museum. p. 734. ISBN 9780850668438.
- Boulger, George Simonds (1900). "White, Francis Buchanan White" . In Lee, Sidney (ed.). Dictionary of National Biography. Vol. 61. London: Smith, Elder & Co.
