= Perth and Kinross Council =

Local authority for Perth and Kinross, Scotland

Perth and Kinross Council Comhairle Pheairt is Cheann Rois
- Coat of arms

- Council logo

Type
- Type: Unitary authority of Perth and Kinross

Leadership
- Provost: Xander McDade, Independent since 25 May 2022
- Leader: Eric Drysdale, SNP since 24 September 2025
- Chief Executive: Thomas Glen since 1 November 2021

Structure
- Seats: 40 councillors
- Graph of the party split among 40 seats.
- Political groups: Administration (16) SNP (16) Other parties (24) Conservative (12) Liberal Democrats (5) Labour (1) Independent (6)
- Length of term: 5 years

Elections
- Voting system: Single transferable vote
- Last election: 5 May 2022
- Next election: 6 May 2027

Meeting place
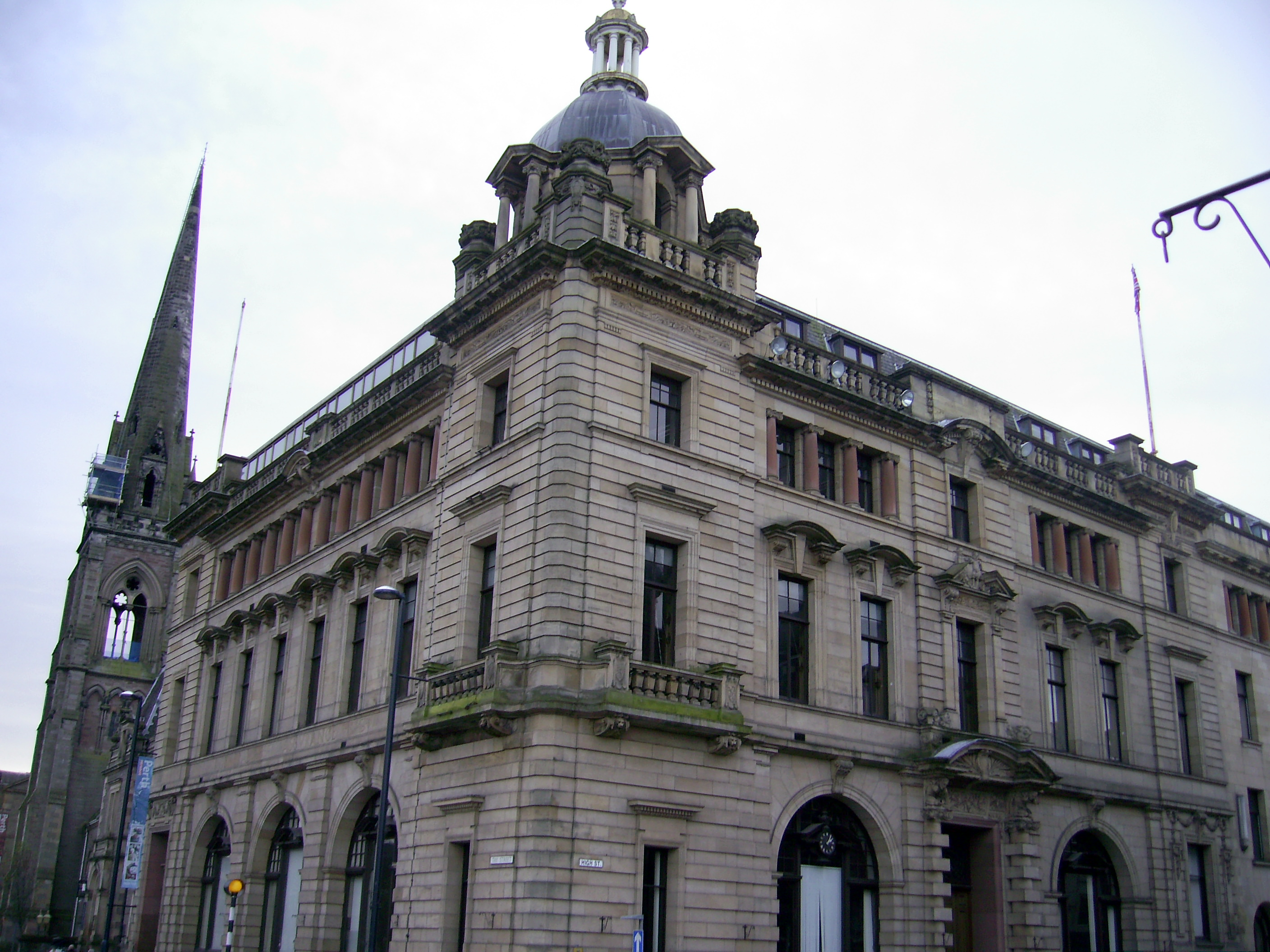
- 2 High Street, Perth, PH1 5PH

Website
- www.pkc.gov.uk

Perth and Kinross Council (Scottish Gaelic: Comhairle Pheairt is Cheann Rois) is the local authority for Perth and Kinross, one of the 32 council areas of Scotland. The council has been under no overall control since 1999. It is based in Perth.

== History ==
A district called Perth and Kinross was created in 1975. Perth and Kinross District Council was one of three lower-tier authorities within the Tayside region, along with Angus and Dundee. It was named after the two historical counties of Perthshire and Kinross-shire, the county councils of which had acted together as the 'Perth and Kinross Joint County Council' between 1930 and 1975. The Perth and Kinross district created in 1975 covered the whole of pre-1975 Kinross-shire and the majority, but not all, of pre-1975 Perthshire.

The modern area and its council were created in 1996 under the Local Government etc. (Scotland) Act 1994, when the Tayside Regional Council was abolished and its functions passed to the three districts, which were reconstituted as council areas. There was also an adjustment to the boundary between Perth and Kinross and Dundee as part of the same reforms, with Longforgan being transferred from Dundee to Perth and Kinross.

== Political control ==
The council has been under no overall control since 1999. Since the 2022 election the council has been led by a minority SNP administration.

The first election to Perth and Kinross District Council was held in 1974, initially operating as a shadow authority alongside the outgoing authorities until the new system came into force on 16 May 1975. A shadow authority was again elected in 1995 ahead of the reforms which came into force on 1 April 1996. Political control of the council since 1975 has been as follows:

Perth and Kinross District Council

| Party in control | Years |
|---|---|
| Conservative | 1975–1984 |
| No overall control | 1984–1992 |
| Conservative | 1992–1996 |

Perth and Kinross Council

| Party in control | Years |
|---|---|
| SNP | 1996–1999 |
| No overall control | 1999–present |

=== Leadership ===
The role of provost is largely ceremonial in Perth and Kinross. They chair full council meetings and act as the council's civic figurehead. Political leadership is provided by the leader of the council. The leaders since 1996 have been:

| Councillor | Party | From | To |
|---|---|---|---|
| Bruce Crawford | SNP | 1 Apr 1996 | May 1999 |
| Jimmy Doig | Independent | May 1999 | 2007 |
| Ian Miller | SNP | 2007 | May 2017 |
| Ian Campbell | Conservative | 17 May 2017 | 6 Feb 2018 |
| Murray Lyle | Conservative | Feb 2018 | May 2022 |
| Grant Laing | SNP | 25 May 2022 | 22 Sep 2025 |
| Eric Drysdale | SNP | 24 Sep 2025 | |

=== Composition ===
Following the 2022 election, and subsequent by-elections and changes of allegiance up to October 2026, the composition of the council was:

| Party | Seats |
|---|---|
| SNP | 16 |
| Conservative | 12 |
| Liberal Democrats | 5 |
| Labour | 1 |
| Independent | 6 |
| Total | 40 |

The next election is due in 2027.

== Elections ==
Elections to the council are held every five years. The most recent poll was held in 2022, on Thursday 5 May. The next local election will be held in 2027.

As a result of the Local Governance (Scotland) Act 2004 and the recommendations put forth by the Local Government Boundary Commission for Scotland, there are twelve wards within the Perth and Kinross council area. The 2007 general election was the first to use the single transferable vote system of election and multi-member wards, each ward electing three or four councillors. This system was introduced as a result of the Local Governance (Scotland) Act 2004, and is designed to produce a form of proportional representation.

=== Wards ===
Map of the area's wards (2017 configuration)

| Ward number | Name | Location | Seats |
|---|---|---|---|
| 1 | Carse of Gowrie | | 3 |
| 2 | Strathmore | | 4 |
| 3 | Blairgowrie and Glens | | 3 |
| 4 | Highland | | 3 |
| 5 | Strathtay | | 3 |
| 6 | Strathearn | | 3 |
| 7 | Strathallan | | 3 |
| 8 | Kinross-shire | | 4 |
| 9 | Almond and Earn | | 3 |
| 10 | Perth City South | | 4 |
| 11 | Perth City North | | 3 |
| 12 | Perth City Centre | | 4 |

== Premises ==
The council meets and has its main offices at 2 High Street in Perth, on the corner with Tay Street, which had been built in 1901 as the headquarters of General Accident. The main public enquiries reception is at the nearby Pullar House at 36 Mill Street, which was formerly the business premises of J. Pullar and Sons. The council also uses the former Municipal Buildings on High Street, completed in 1881 for the old burgh council of Perth. It also has area offices in Auchterarder, Blairgowrie, Crieff and Pitlochry.
