= A989 road =

Road in Scotland

Coordinates: 56.396635°N 3.43219°W

A989

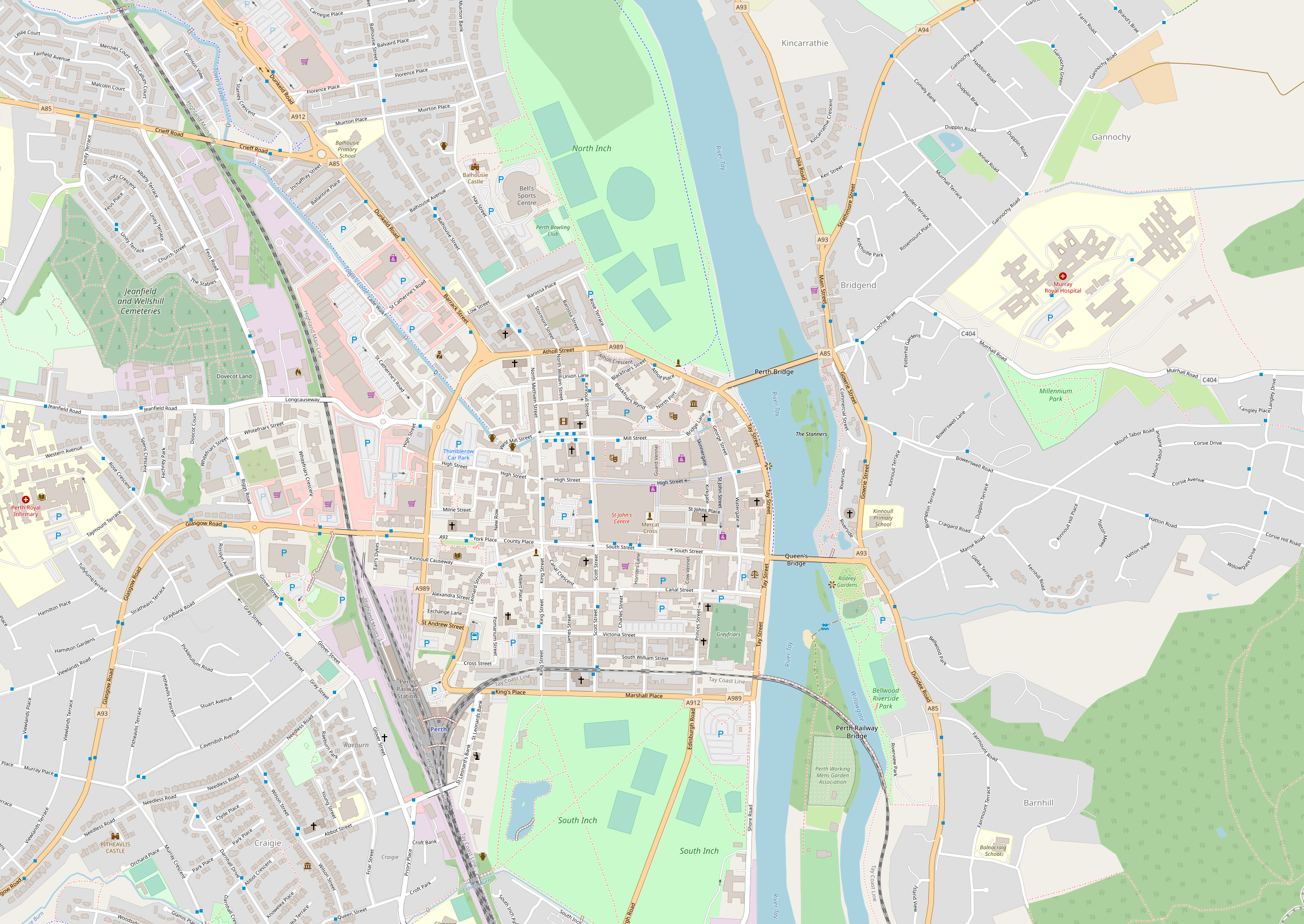

Route information
- Length: 1.93 mi (3.11 km)

Major junctions
- A85 (West Bridge Street); A93 (South Street) A912 (Edinburgh Road); A93 (York Place); A85 (Barrack Street)

Location
- Country: United Kingdom

Road network
- Roads in the United Kingdom; Motorways; A and B road zones

The A989 is a road in Perth, Scotland. Also known as the Perth Inner Ring Road, due to its circumnavigation of the city centre, it is 1.93 miles (3.11 km) long. Perth's city centre is around 0.5 miles (0.80 km) long and wide. The road was constructed around 1985.

== Route ==
The road has five major intersections (clockwise from the north): West Bridge Street (A85; crosses the River Tay via Smeaton's Bridge, leading east/west to and from Bridgend), South Street (A93; crosses the River Tay via the Queen's Bridge leading east/west to and from Bridgend), Edinburgh Road (A912; leading south), York Place (A93; leading west) and Barrack Street (A912; leading north).

Its name changes several times over its nearly two-mile course (again, clockwise from the north): in the vicinity of the North Inch, it is Atholl Street, becoming Charlotte Street to the east, then south onto Tay Street, which runs along the western banks of the Tay. Turning west at Tay Street's junction with Shore Road in the south, it becomes Marshall Place, then King's Place, as it passes the South Inch. Turning north at Perth railway station it becomes Leonard Street. Opposite Perth bus station, it turns west, becoming St Andrew Street briefly, then Caledonian Road. Finally, in the northwestern corner of the city centre, the road becomes Atholl Street again.

== Notable building and structures ==
The following buildings and structures stand beside the road.

- Statue of Albert, Prince Consort, Charlotte Street
- Royal George Hotel – has an entrance from Tay Street
- Municipal Buildings, 1–5 High Street and 8–18 Tay Street
- 2 High Street, southern elevation is on Tay Street
- St Matthew's (formerly West) Church, Tay Street
- 26 Tay Street – formerly Perth Savings Bank
- Sheriff Court, former site of Gowrie House, 46–52 Tay Street
- Perth Water Works, Marshall Place
- St Leonard's-in-the-Fields Church, Marshall Place
- Statue of Sir Walter Scott, King's Place at the South Inch
- Perth railway station, King Street
- Station Hotel, Leonard Street
- Perth bus station, Leonard Street
- St Ninian's Cathedral, Atholl Street

== Gallery ==
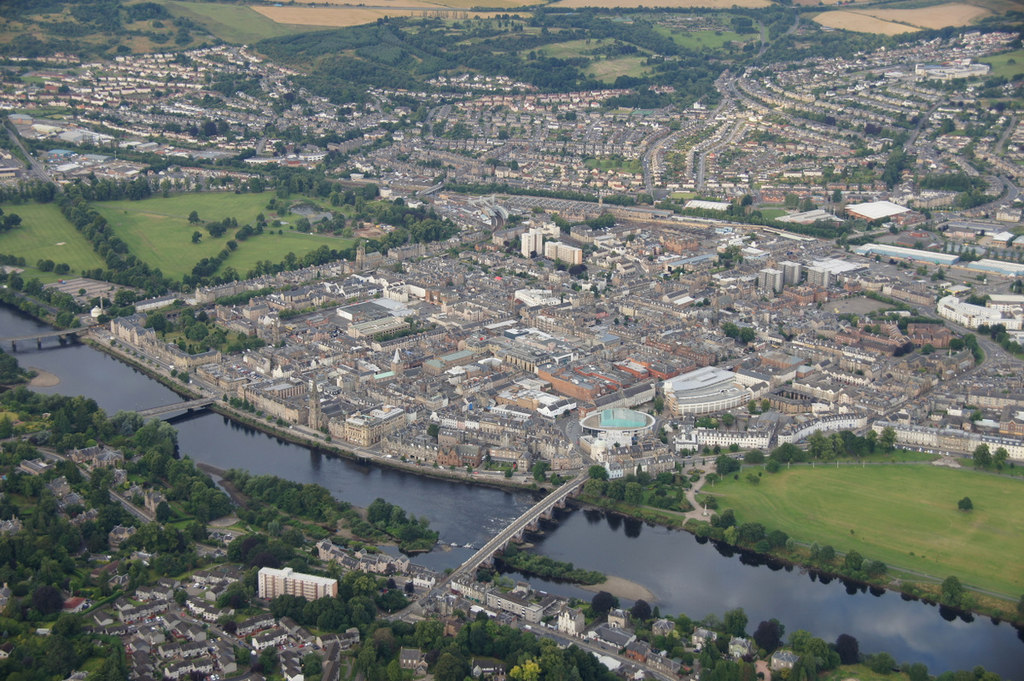
The A989 can be seen surrounding Perth's city centre here. At right, near the North Inch, is Charlotte Street, changing to Atholl Street at the bend. On the left, running along the northern boundary of the South Inch is King's Place and (closer to the river) Marshall Place. Finally, Tay Street runs along the river, with Smeaton's Bridge at its northern end

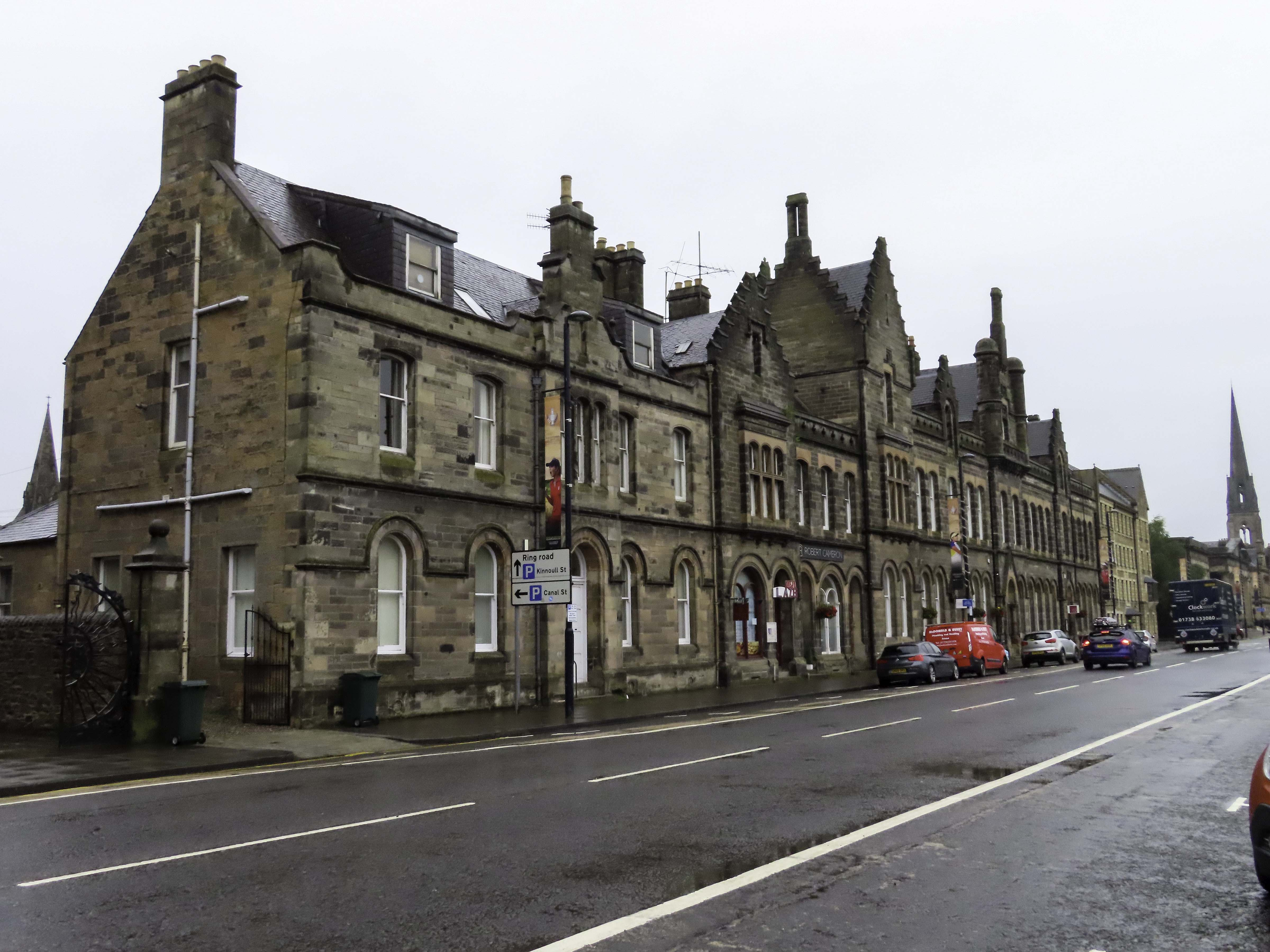
Tay Street, in front of the former Perth Museum building
