= 2 Tay Street =

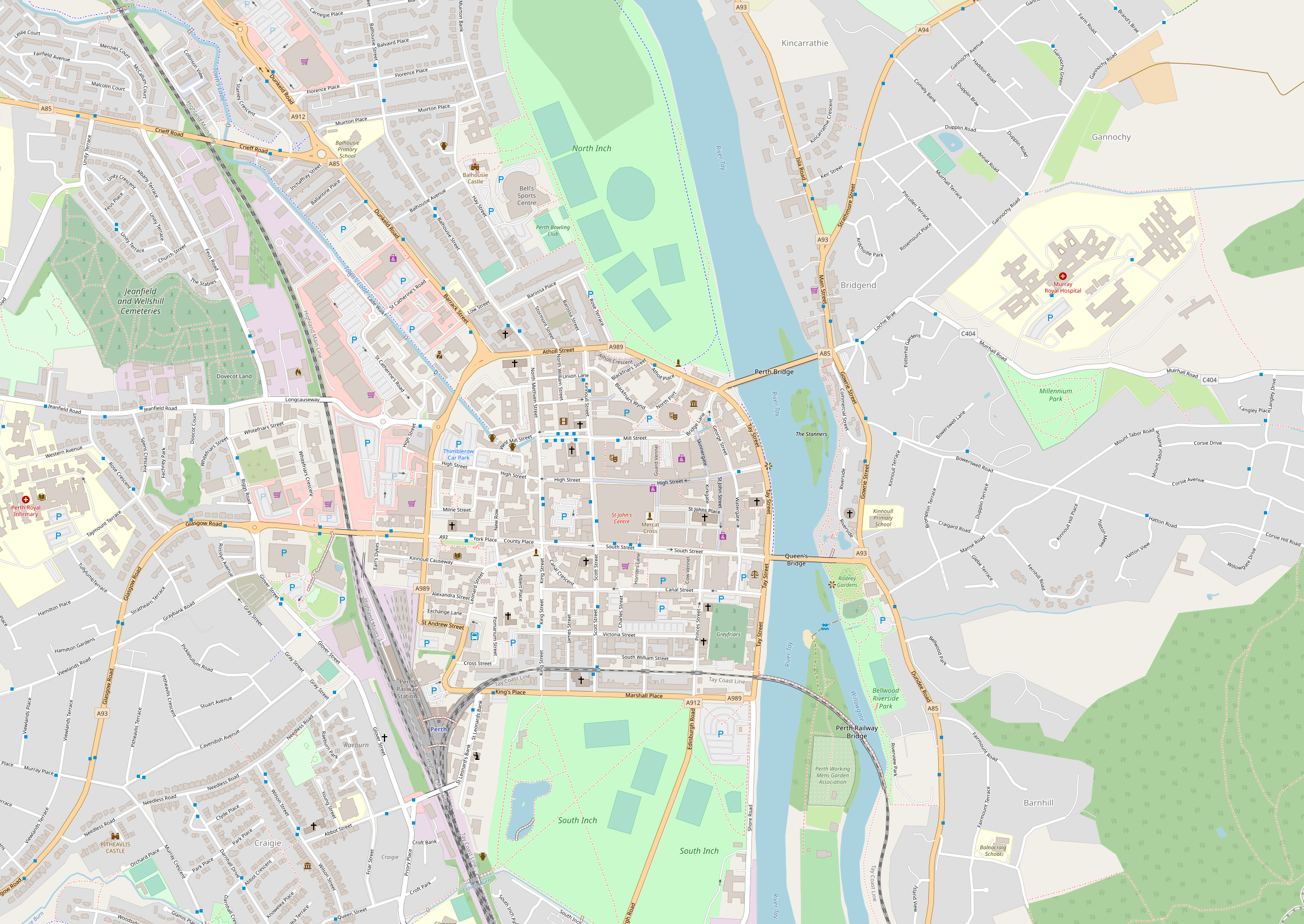
- Shown in Perth
- 56.39836812°N 3.4273449°W
- Location: 2 Tay Street, Perth, Scotland

History
- Built: c. 1875 (151 years ago)

Listed Building – Category C(S)
- Designated: 26 August 1977
- Reference no.: LB39654

2 Tay Street is an historic building in Perth, Scotland. It is Category C listed, dating to around 1875, and stands on Tay Street, near its junction with Bridge Lane, Charlotte Street and West Bridge Street, at the foot of Perth Bridge.

The three-storey building is described by Historic Environment Scotland as being constructed of "stugged red ashlar". Its central section is recessed slightly compared to its northern and southern sections, with a single window above the door.

== See also ==
- List of listed buildings in Perth, Scotland
