= J. & G. Young =

Scottish architect

- George Young, pictured around 1920

Practice information
- Key architects: John Young (1826–1895); George Young (1858–1933)
- Founded: 1885
- Dissolved: 1895; 130 years ago
- Location: Perth, Scotland

Significant works and honors
- Buildings: Fair Maid's House

J. & G. Young was a Scottish architectural firm from Perth composed of John Young and his son, George. They were in business between 1885 and 1895, when John died. Their total number of works together numbers around fifteen, ranging from churches to public buildings.

== John Young ==
John Young was born in Perth, Perthshire, on 27 March 1826. Towards the middle of the century, he married Catherine Mill Meldrum. Around 1870, he began a partnership with his cousin, Dundonian Andrew Mackie Meldrum. They opened a Dundee office for Meldrum, which seemed to be successful, but the practice over-extended itself in promoting Dundee's Queen's Hotel, in Nethergate. This is based on information from the District Engineer's Office in Perth that the new Caledonian Railway Station would be located just to the south of it. After an over-commitment on the Glasgow Central Station project, and the collapse of City of Glasgow Bank in 1878, the Dundee station did not proceed, while the subsequent severe recession affected trading. The partnership was dissolved in 1882, with Meldrum moving into a new profession.

Young was one of the early members of the Perthshire Society of Natural Science, which his son joined in May 1872.

== George Young ==
George Penrose Kennedy Young was born in 1858, named for another architect. After studying at Perth Academy, he was articled to his father in 1875. After a short period as his assistant, he spent a year in London, where he studied architecture under Professor Thomas Roger Smith at University College London (where he was prizeman in construction in 1881) and drawing under Alphonse Legros at the Slade School. He passed the qualifying exam in 1885 and was admitted Royal Institute of British Architects on 8 June, his proposers being John Honeyman (St Matthew's Church), Thomas Lennox Watson and John Burnet Sr. Shortly thereafter, he married Charlotte Anne Conacher. That same year, 1885, Young formed a partnership his son, George, continuing a business founded by George's grandfather. Their office was at 42 Tay Street, part of Perth's Victoria Buildings, which they designed. George became sole partner on his father's death on 2 December 1895.

In 1906, Young was listed as a member of the International Congress of Architects.

Young died on 28 October 1933.

== Selected notable works ==
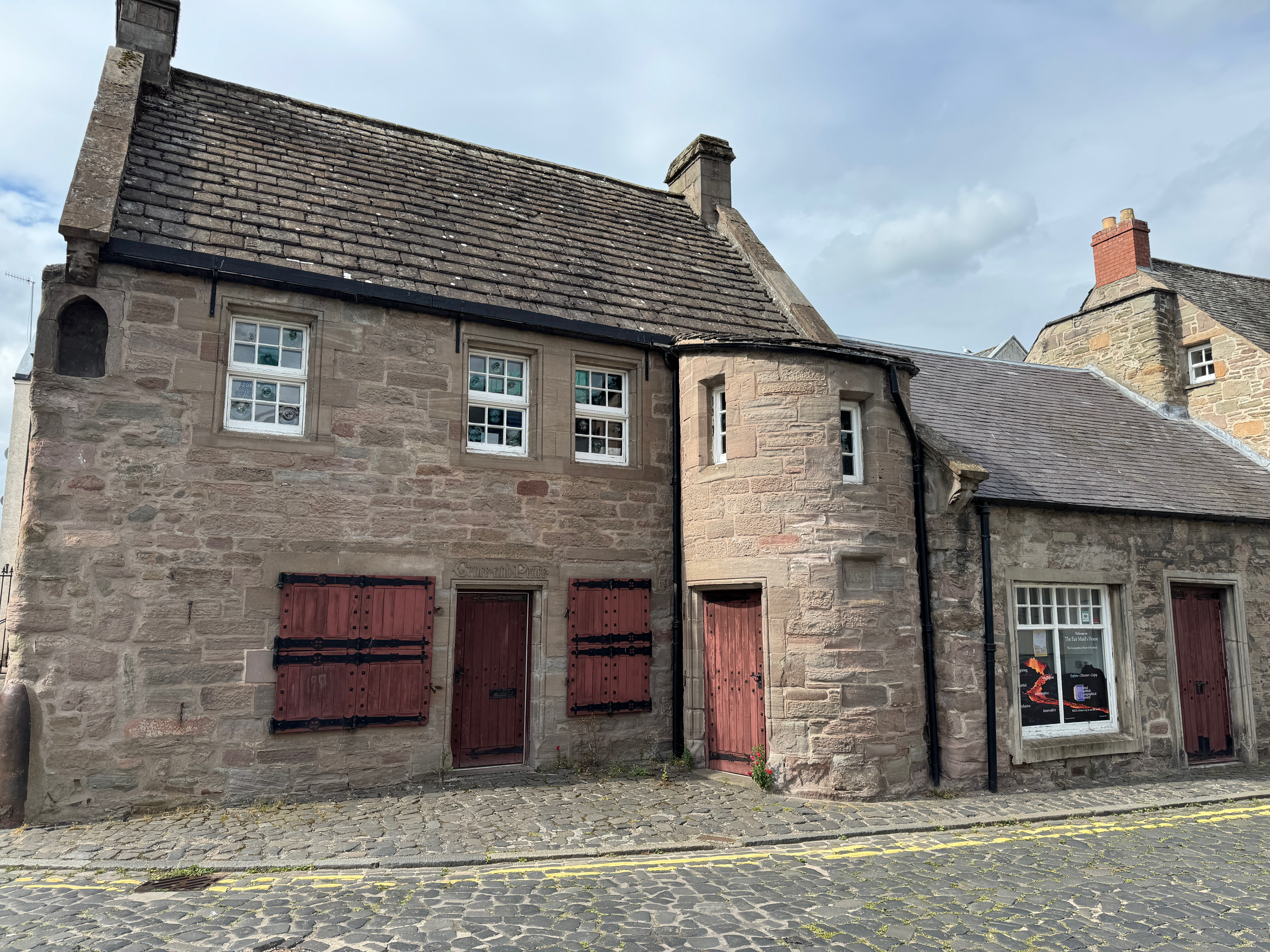
The father-and-son team worked on the interior of the 1629-built Fair Maid's House between 1893 and 1894

- 62–72 Tay Street, Perth (1881)
- Livingstone Hall, Newburgh, Fife (1885)
- Crieff and Comrie Railway (1892; including stations on the line)
- Fair Maid's House, Perth (1893)
- 2 High Street, Perth (1901)
