= Hippolyte Blanc =

Scottish architect (1844–1917)

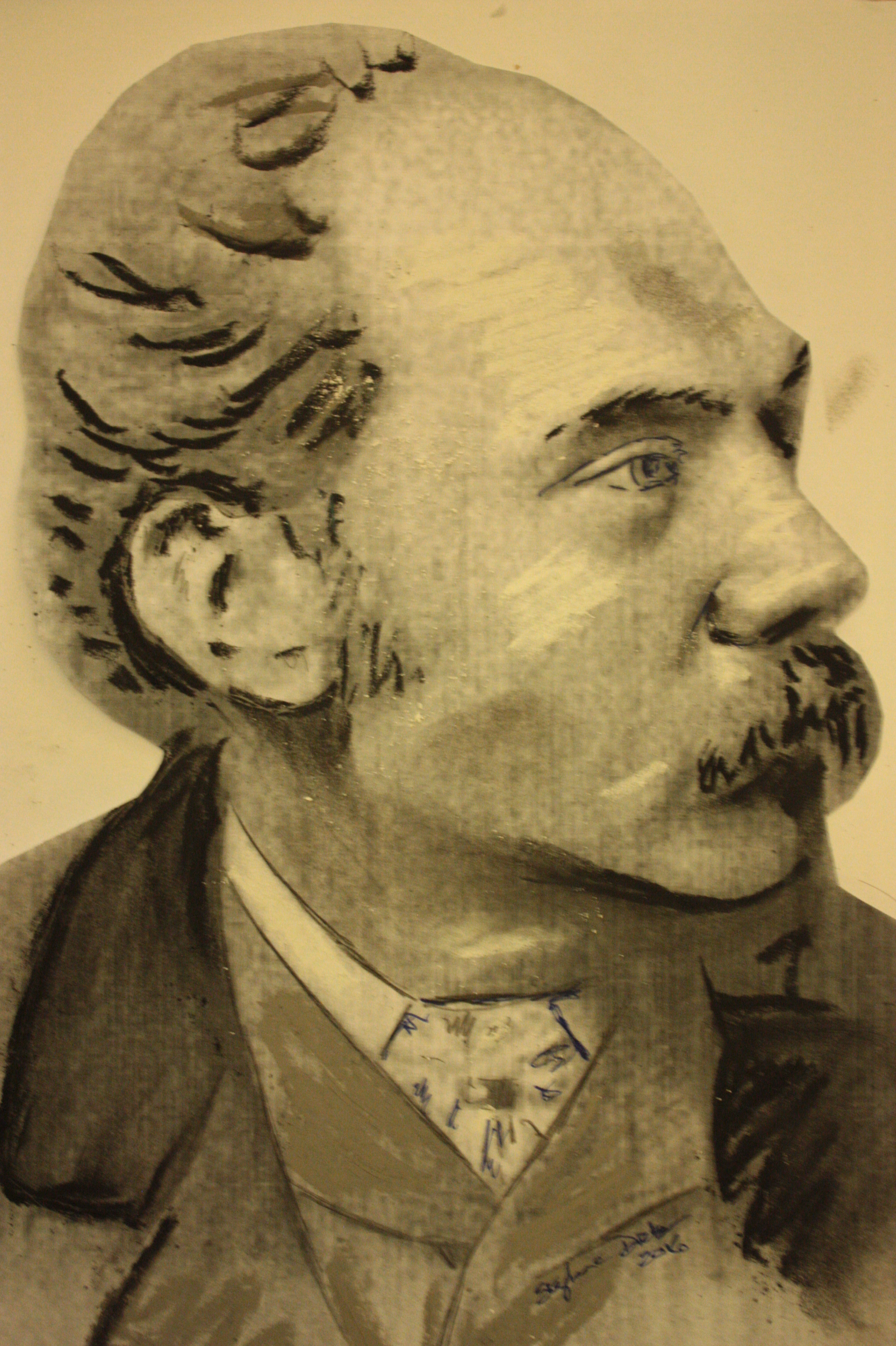
- Hippolyte Blanc, c. 1890
- Born: 18 August 1844; Edinburgh, Scotland
- Died: 17 March 1917 (aged 72); Edinburgh, Scotland
- Occupation: Architect

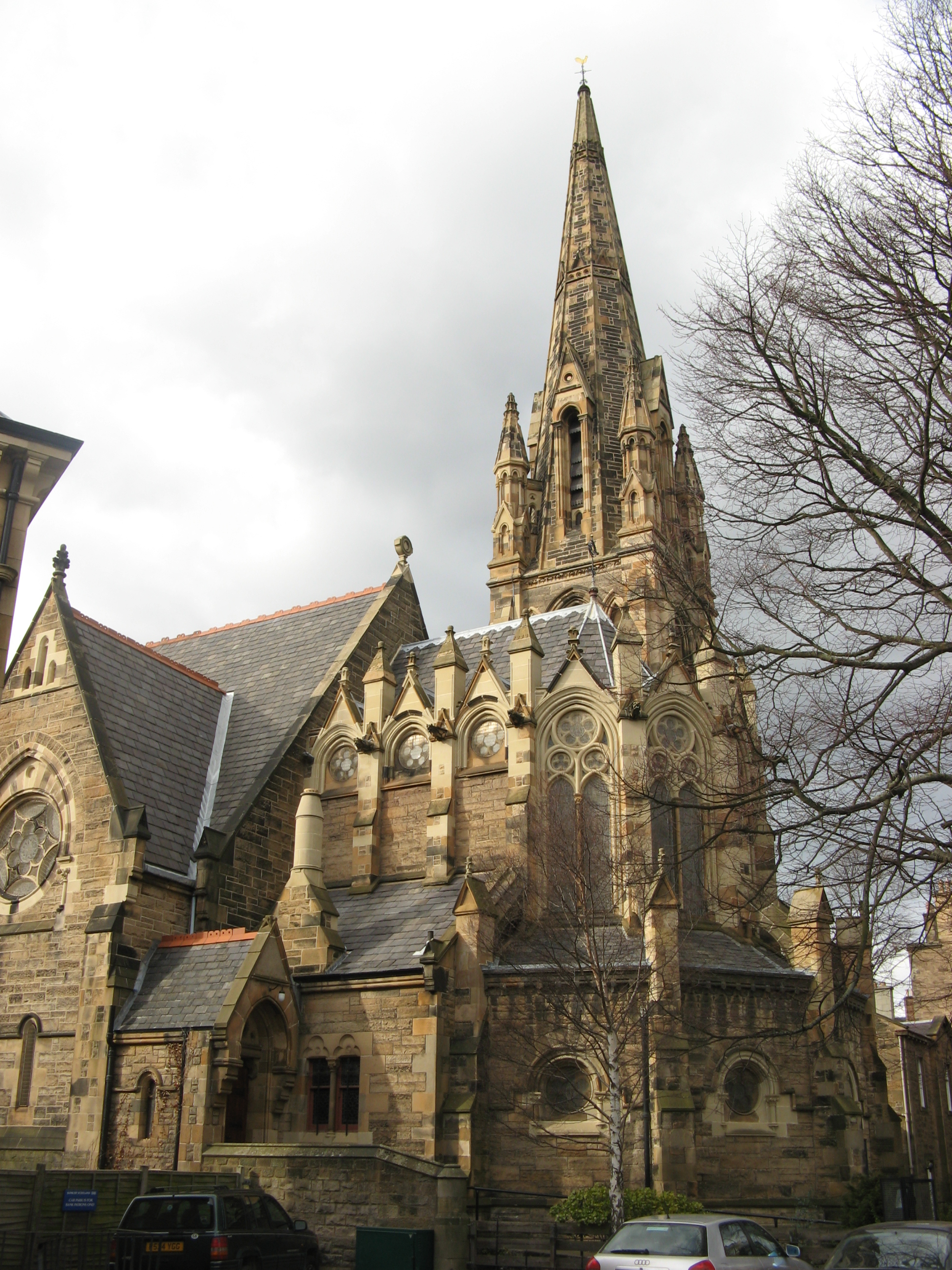
Christ Church Episcopal, Morningside (1875–78), Blanc's first competition-winning design

Hippolyte Jean Blanc (18 August 1844 – 17 March 1917) was a Scottish architect. A designer of church buildings in the Gothic revival style, he was also an antiquarian who oversaw restoration projects.

== Early life ==
Hippolyte Blanc was born at 37 North Frederick Street in Edinburgh, third son of four children, to French parents who ran a business on George Street importing and manufacturing ladies' shoes. His father, Victor Jacques Blanc, was from Privas in the Ardèche area of France. He met Hippolyte's mother, Sarah or Sartia Bauress, whilst living in Dublin and moved to Edinburgh around 1840. Their firm "Madame Blanc et Fils" was at 68 George Street immediately opposite a house they moved to later in Hippolyte's life at 69 George Street.

Blanc attended George Heriot's School, winning the dux medal in 1859, and was then articled to the architect David Rhind. While working for Rhind, he attended classes at the School of Art and Design, where he met Thomas Ross, and became interested in medieval architecture. In 1864, after completing his articles, he joined the Government Office of Works under Robert Matheson, where he became a senior draughtsman in 1869. He married Elizabeth Shield on 21 August 1873, and they moved to 12 St Vincent Street. They later moved to the Grange area in south Edinburgh: first to 2 Thirlestane Road and finally to 17 Strathearn Place.

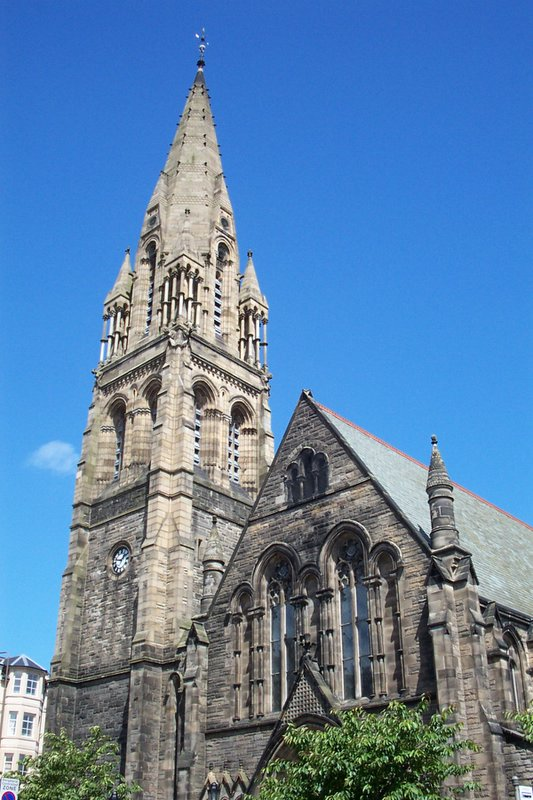
Mayfield Free Church (1876–79), now Mayfield Salisbury Church

== Architectural career ==
For much of his career Blanc's office was at 40 Frederick Street, extremely close to his parental home and their shop. In 1901 the office moved to 1 Rutland Square.

From the early 1870s, Blanc began to undertake private commissions. In 1875, he won his first architectural competition, for Christ Church, Morningside, and the following year won a second, for Mayfield Free Church. He left the Office of Works in 1878 to concentrate on his increasing workload, and by 1887 he had taken on a partner, James Gordon.

Church buildings executed by Blanc include Kirkliston Free Church (1880), St Luke's, Broughty Ferry (1884), Coats Memorial Baptist Church, Paisley (1885), St Matthew's Parish Church (now Morningside Parish Church) (1888, opened 1890) and Morningside Free Church, Edinburgh (1892), now the Church Hill Theatre. He carried out restoration work to Edinburgh Castle (1886), John Knox House (1886), St Cuthbert's Church, Edinburgh (1892), and St Duthac's Church, Tain (1896). Secular work includes Mayville Gardens in Trinity, Edinburgh, a Victorian cul-de-sac with a low terrace of ornate houses on each side (1881). Other major commissions included houses at Eriska, Argyll, and Ferguslie Park, Paisley (1888–91), since demolished. Bangour Village Hospital, West Lothian, was a competition win in 1898, and he designed the former Bernard's Brewery buildings in Gorgie (1887). Blanc also designed several monuments. In 1912 he took his son, Frank Edward Belcombe Blanc, into partnership, and from 1913 his own architectural work drew to a close. His son continued to practice under the name Hippolyte J. Blanc & Son, until around 1950. From 1893 to 1898 his nephew, Louis David Blanc (1877–1944), also trained under him (working largely on the Coats Memorial Church in Paisley). Louis went on to specialise in department store design, being employed by Harrods as their in-house architect from around 1928. Blanc's eldest son, Victor Hippolyte Blanc, chose to be a dentist rather than an architect.

Sir Frank Mears trained under Blanc from 1896 to 1901. Alexander Lorne Campbell trained under him in 1897.

== Other activities ==
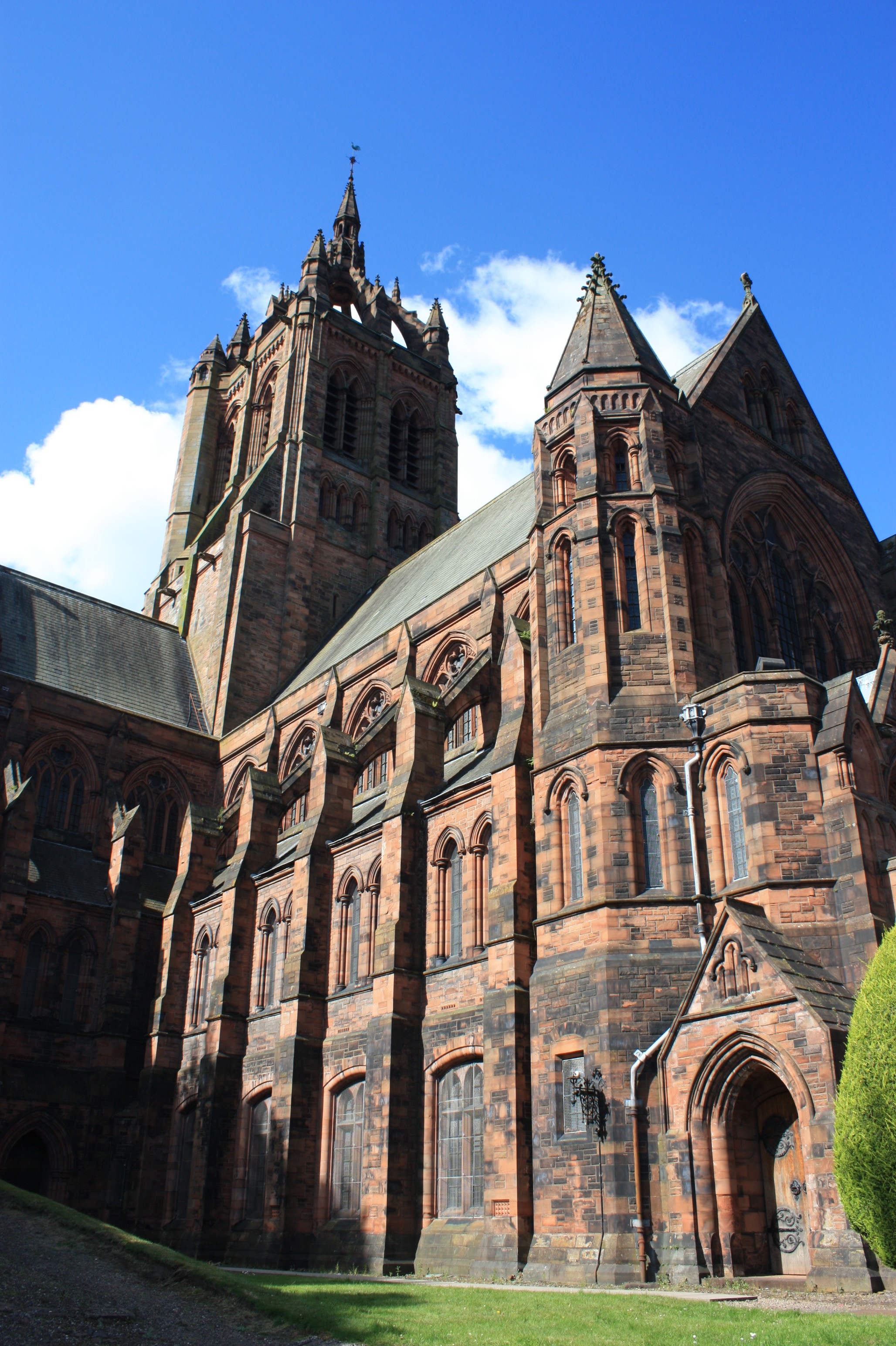
The massive Coats Memorial Baptist Church in Paisley

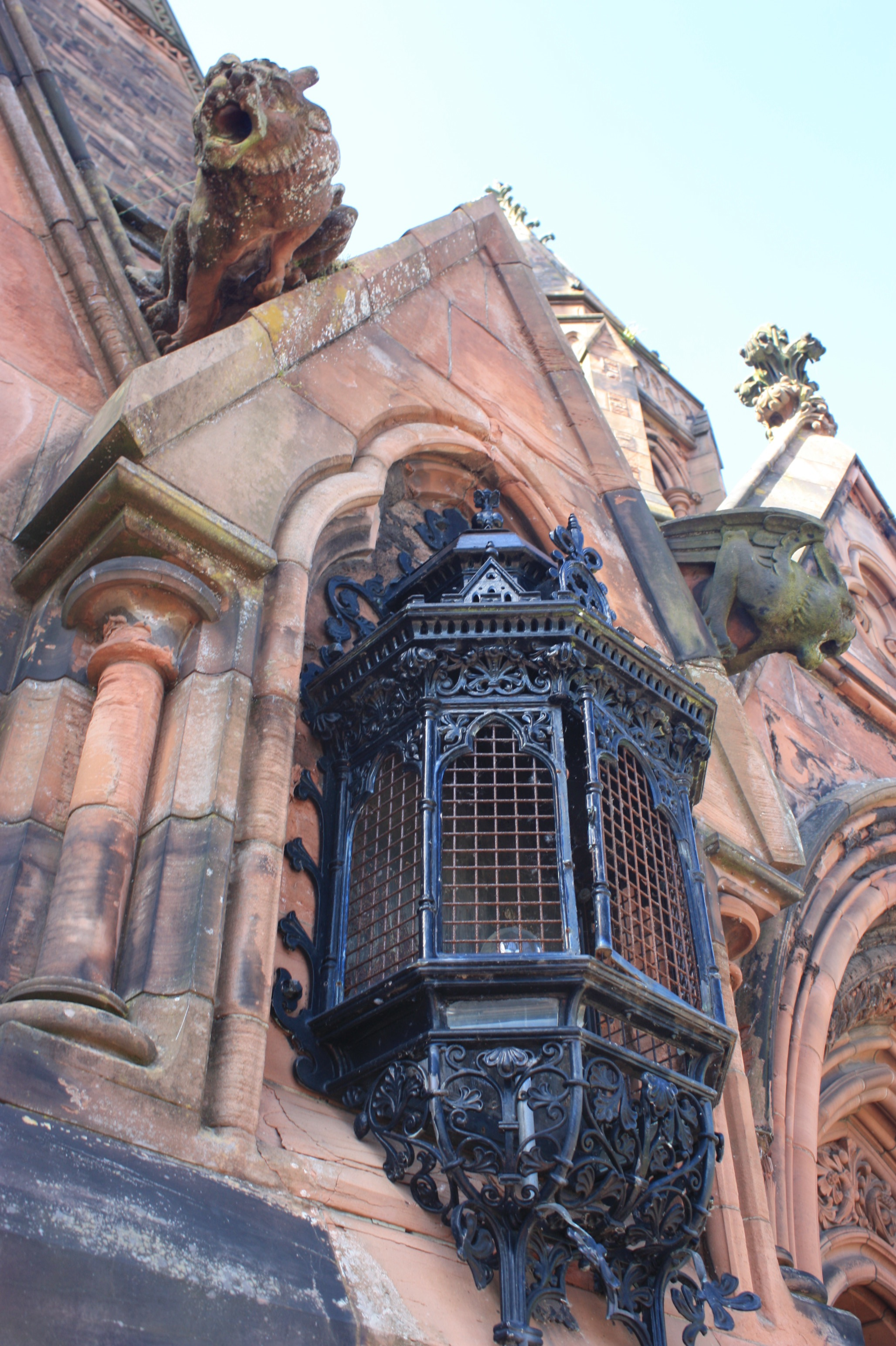
Detail on Coats Memorial Church in Paisley

In 1871 Blanc was elected president of the Edinburgh Architectural Association for the first of three times. He became a fellow of the Society of Antiquaries of Scotland in 1879, a fellow of the Royal Institute of British Architects (RIBA) in 1901, and was elected to the Royal Scottish Academy (RSA) in 1896. In addition, he was an active member of several other learned societies. He wrote and lectured extensively, largely on the subject of medieval church architecture. Blanc served as president and treasurer of the RSA from 1907 to 1917, and was president of the Edinburgh Photographic Society from 1888 until 1892, and honorary president from 1896 until his death. In 1910 he was appointed to a Royal Commission which oversaw British involvement in International Exhibitions held in Brussels (1910), Rome (1911) and Turin (1911). He was active in encouraging the careers of younger architects, and acted as assessor on several architectural competitions. From 1913 to 1916 he served on the ruling council of the prominent Edinburgh conservationist group the Cockburn Association.

== Death ==
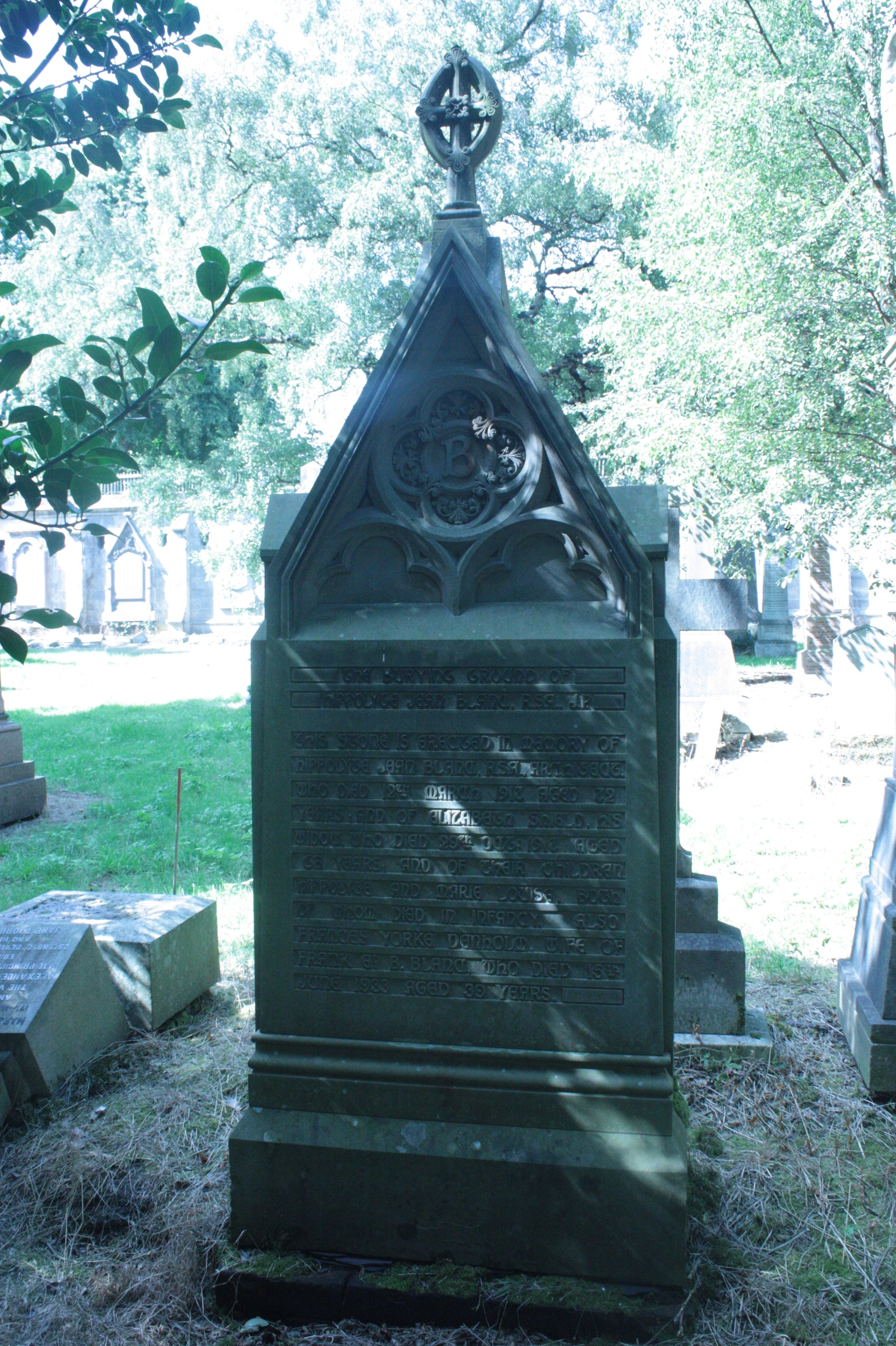
Hippolyte Blanc's grave, Warriston Cemetery

Blanc died, aged 72, from pneumonia at his home at 17 Strathearn Place, Morningside. He was buried in Warriston Cemetery in its lower section, just south of the vaults, southeast of the monument to James Young Simpson.

== Major works ==
- Christ Church (Episcopal), Bruntsfield Place in Morningside, Edinburgh (1875)
- Mayfield Free Church and manse, Edinburgh (1876), now Mayfield Salisbury Church
- Kinnaird Parish Church, Perthshire (1879)
- St Margaret's Episcopal Church, Easter Road, Edinburgh (1879)
- Broxburn United Presbyterian (UP) Church, West Lothian (1880), now known as the Broxburn Parish Church under the Church of Scotland*Spire for the Free Church in Kirkliston, West Lothian (1880)
- Greenbank United Presbetyrian Church, Greenock (1880)
- St Cuthbert's Wholesale Cooperative Association Headquarters, Fountainbridge, Edinburgh (1880)
- Mayville Gardens (a pair of picturesque terraced cottages facing each other), Trinity, Edinburgh (1881)
- Chalmers Free Church, Edinburgh (1882)
- Polwarth Terrace, Church of Scotland (1882) (demolished)
- West Kilbride UP Church (1882)
- St Luke's Church, Broughty Ferry (1884)
- Bruntsfield Golf Clubhouse, Musselburgh (1885)
- Thomas Coats Memorial Baptist Church, Paisley (1885)
- Free Church, manse and cottages at Woodend, Abercorn, West Lothian (1885)
- Free Middle Church, Perth (1885)
- North Leith Parish Church Hall and School (1885) (demolished)
- Argyle Tower and portcullis gate, Edinburgh Castle (1886)
- Monument to Alexander III of Scotland (west of Kinghorn) (1886)
- Bernard's Brewery and Offices, Gorgie, Edinburgh (1887) (brewery demolished) (offices converted to housing)
- Stables at Ferguslie Park, Paisley (1888)
- Lodge at Ferguslie Park, Paisley (1891)
- Troon Parish Church, Ayrshire (1893)
- Bridgeness Tower, Bo'ness, conversion of windmill into an observatory (1895)
- Kirk Memorial Evangelical Union Church, Montgomery Street, Edinburgh (now Holyrood Evangelical Church) (1895)
- Victoria Halls in Selkirk (1895)
- Maxwell Street School, Innerleithen, Peeblesshire (1896)
- Masonic Hall, Selkirk (1897)
- Bangour Village Asylum and Village (Bangour Hospital) (1898)
- Morningside Parish Church (originally St Matthew's Parish Church) (1888, opened 1890)
- Extension and remodelling of Jenners on Princes Street (1902)
- St Serfs UF Church, Almondbank, Perthshire (1904)
- Stevenson UF Church, Stevenston, Ayrshire (1904)
- Pitcairngreen UF Church, Perth (1905)
- Bridge House, Mid Calder, West Lothian (1908)
- Carnegie Baths, Forfar, Angus (1908)
- Ardchattan and Connel UF Church, Benderloch (1911)
- Bellcote for Limekilns Parish Church (1911)
- The Rialto Cinema, Soho, London (1912)
