= 62–72 Tay Street =

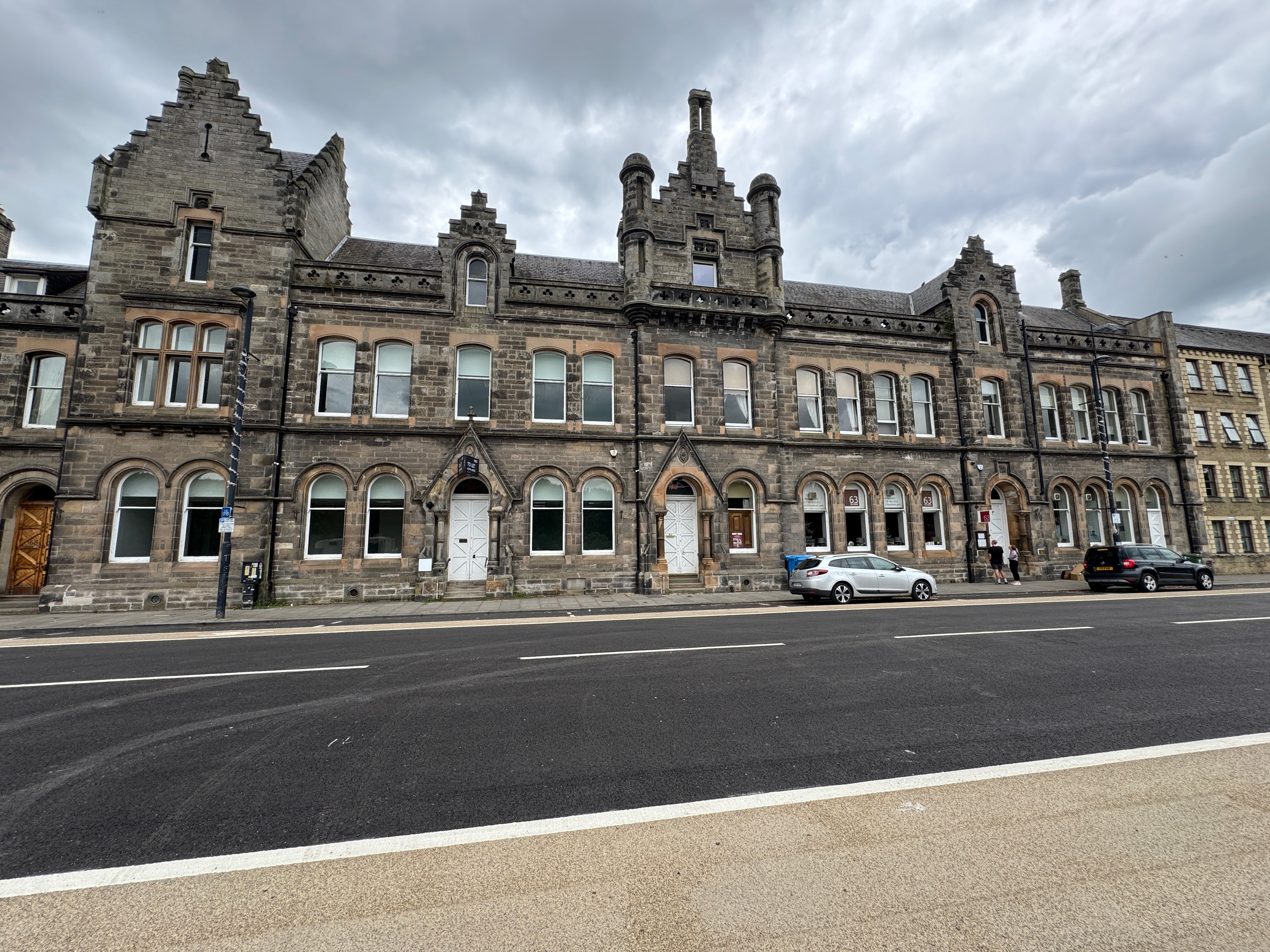
- The building in 2024. Note the newer section at right

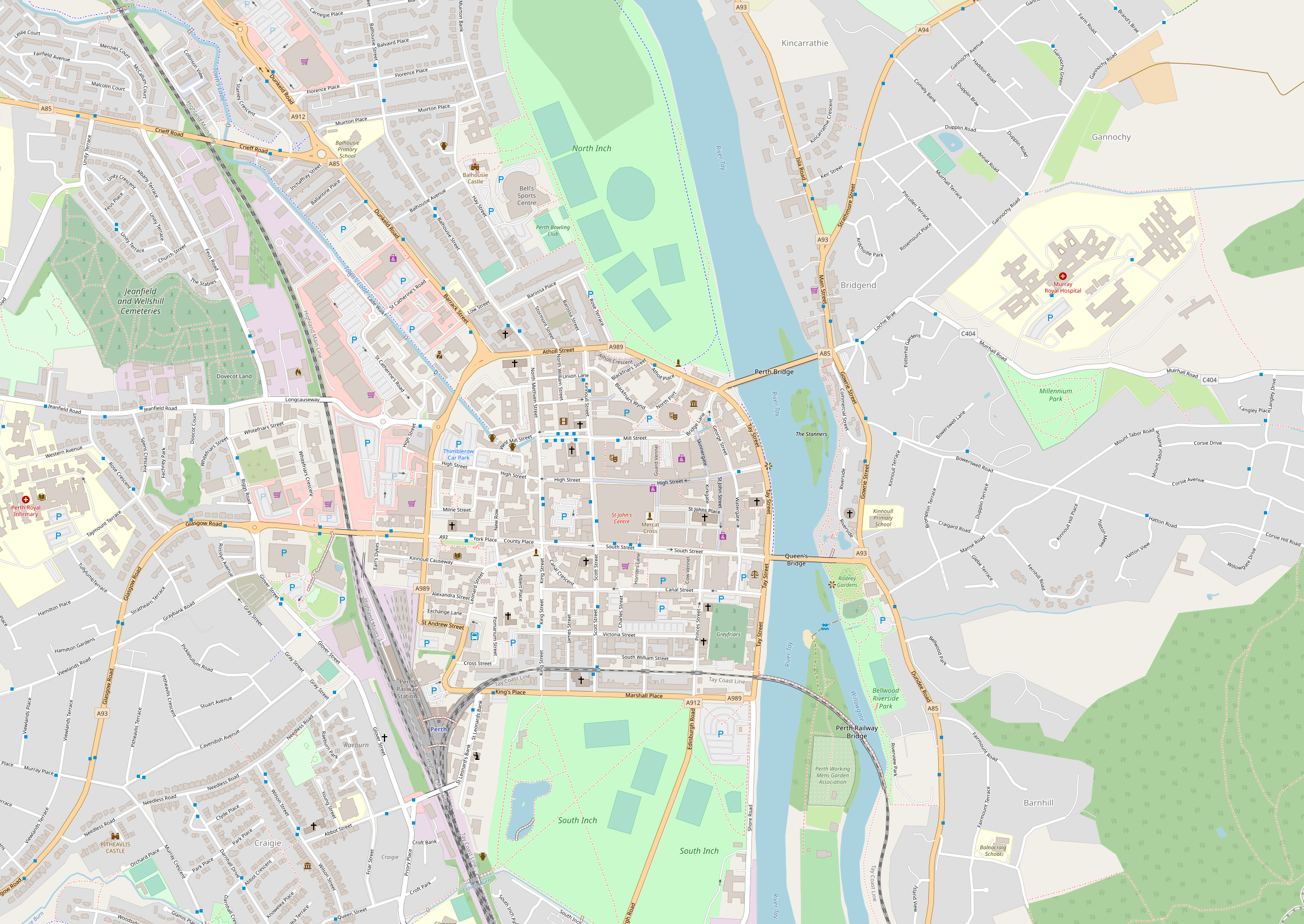
- Shown in Perth
- 56.3936°N 3.4261°W
- Location: 62–72 Tay Street, Perth

History
- Built: 1881 (145 years ago)

Site notes
- Architect: John Young

Listed Building – Category B
- Designated: 20 May 1965
- Reference no.: LB39658

62–72 Tay Street (also known as the County Buildings) is an historic row of buildings in Perth, Scotland. Designed by local architect John Young, the building is Category B listed, dating to 1881. Standing on Tay Street, the building was originally the museum home of the Perthshire Society of Natural Science, constructed in memory of Sir Thomas Moncreiffe, 7th Baronet, a past president of the society. The museum housed two exhibits: a local (or regional) collection (which contained a collection of the animals, plants and rocks to be found in Perthshire and the basin of the Tay) and The Type (or Index) Museum, which illustrated the main types of animals, plants and rocks.

The museum was extended in 1895 by John Young's son, George Penrose Kennedy Young.

In 1902, the museum and its collection were given to the town council. The museum closed in 1934, and its artefacts moved to Perth Art Gallery on nearby George Street.

The building subsequently became a Masonic Hall. A Masonic insignia is carved into the doorpiece.

The northern end of the building (numbers 68–72) were destroyed by a fire in 1987.

Number 63 is the home of restaurant 63 Tay Street, owned by Graeme Pallister.

== Rebuilding ==
This pre-1987 image shows the original northern end of the building

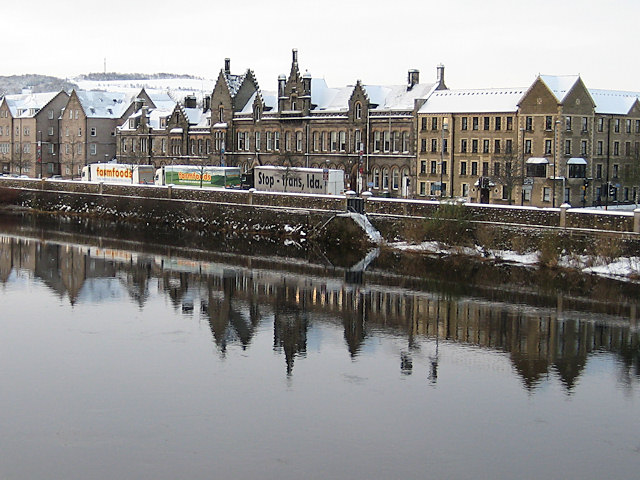
Viewed from Bridgend, with its rebuilt northern end (numbers 68–72) more visible

== See also ==
- List of listed buildings in Perth, Scotland
