= Perth Middle Church =

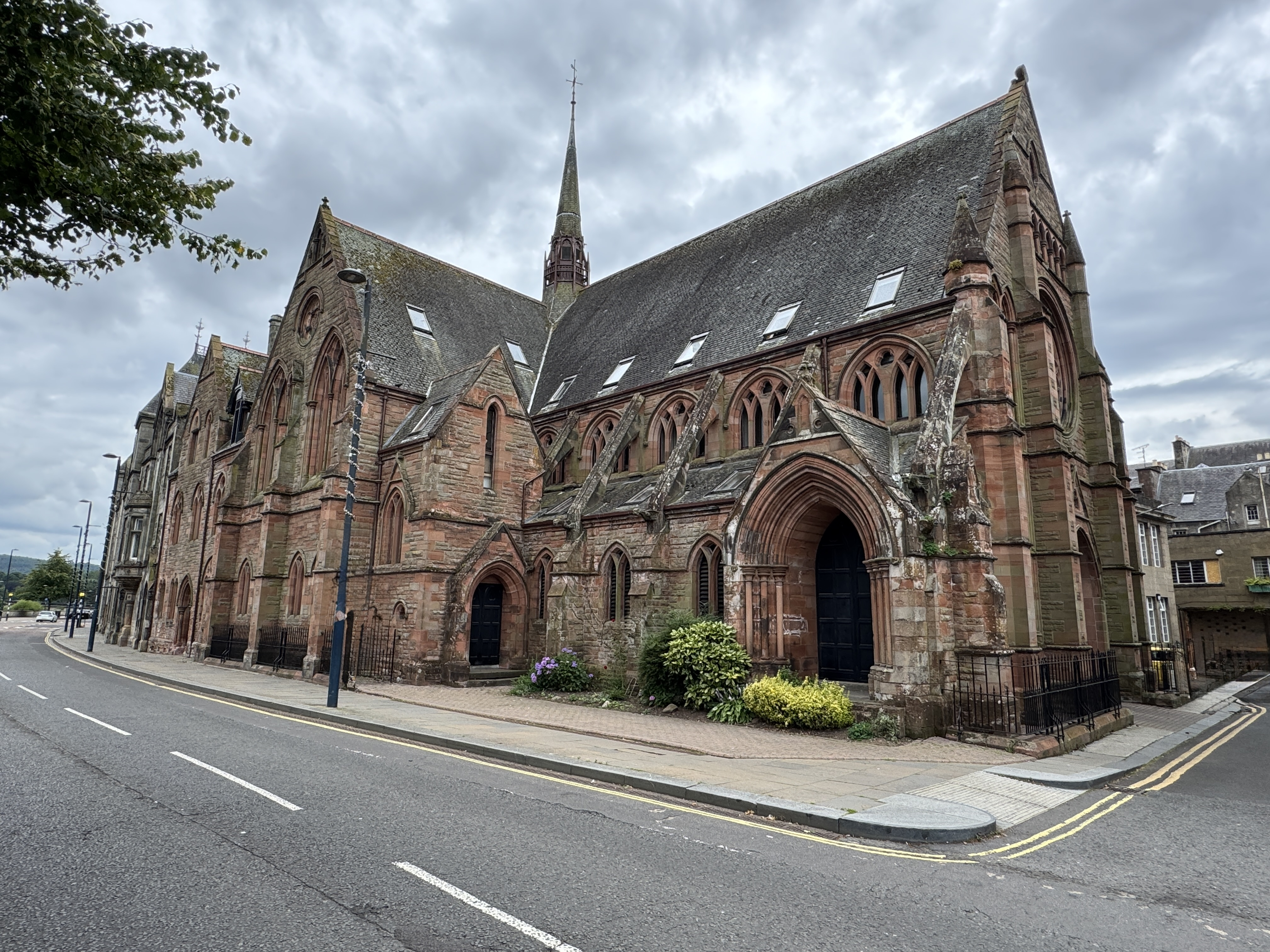
- The church in 2024
- Perth Middle Church
- 56°23′51″N 3°25′35″W
- Location: Tay Street, Perth, Perth and Kinross
- Country: Scotland

History
- Status: closed

Architecture
- Functional status: used
- Heritage designation: Category B listed building
- Designated: 26 August 1977
- Architect: Hippolyte Blanc
- Completed: 1887 (139 years ago)

Perth Middle Church is a former church building located in Perth, Perth and Kinross, Scotland. Standing on Tay Street, at its junction with George Inn Lane, it is adjoined to the south by Perth's Municipal Buildings. It was completed in 1887, the work of Hippolyte Blanc, and is now a Category B listed building.

== See also ==
- List of listed buildings in Perth, Scotland
