= 46–52 Tay Street =

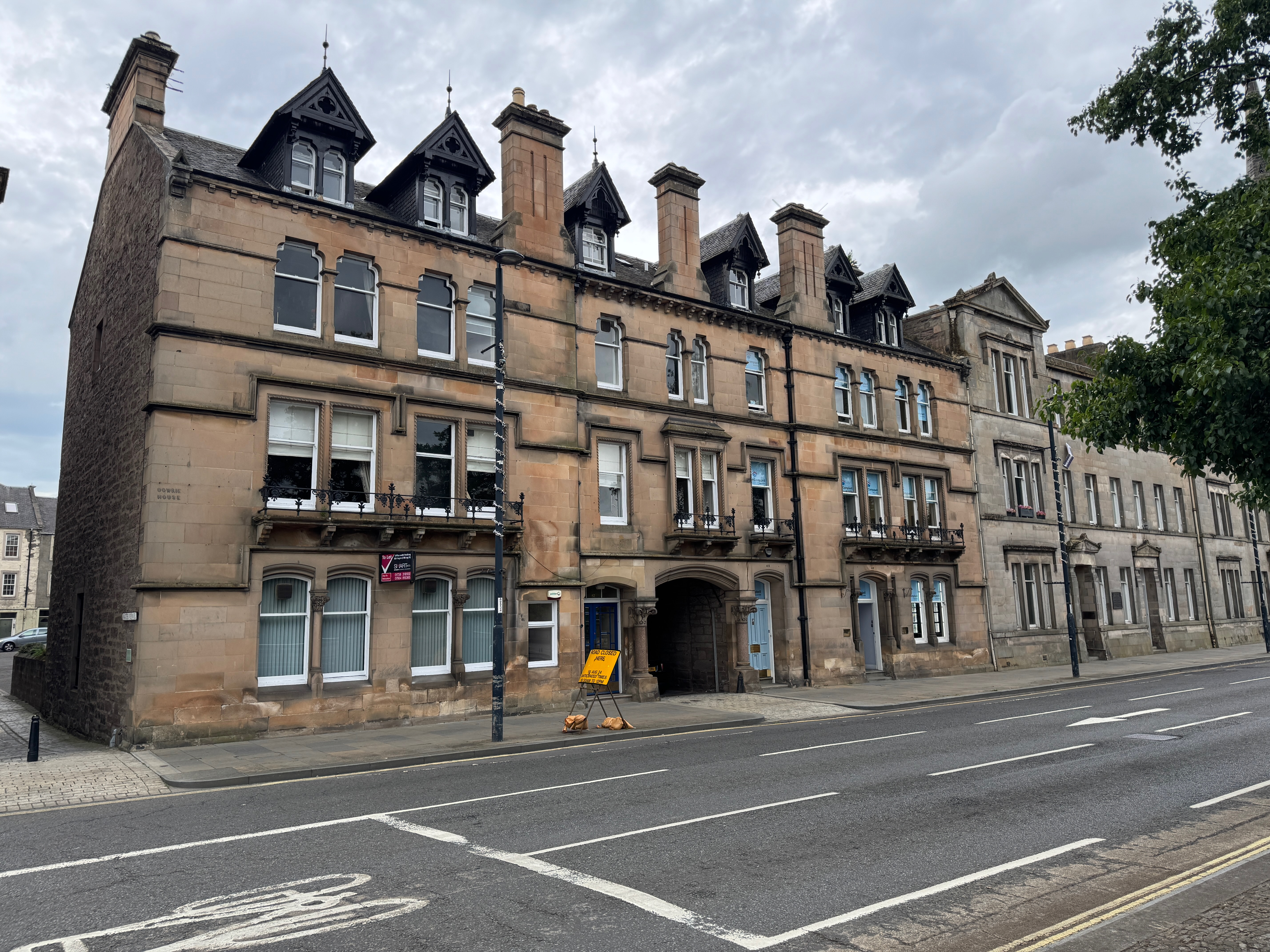
- Pictured in 2024

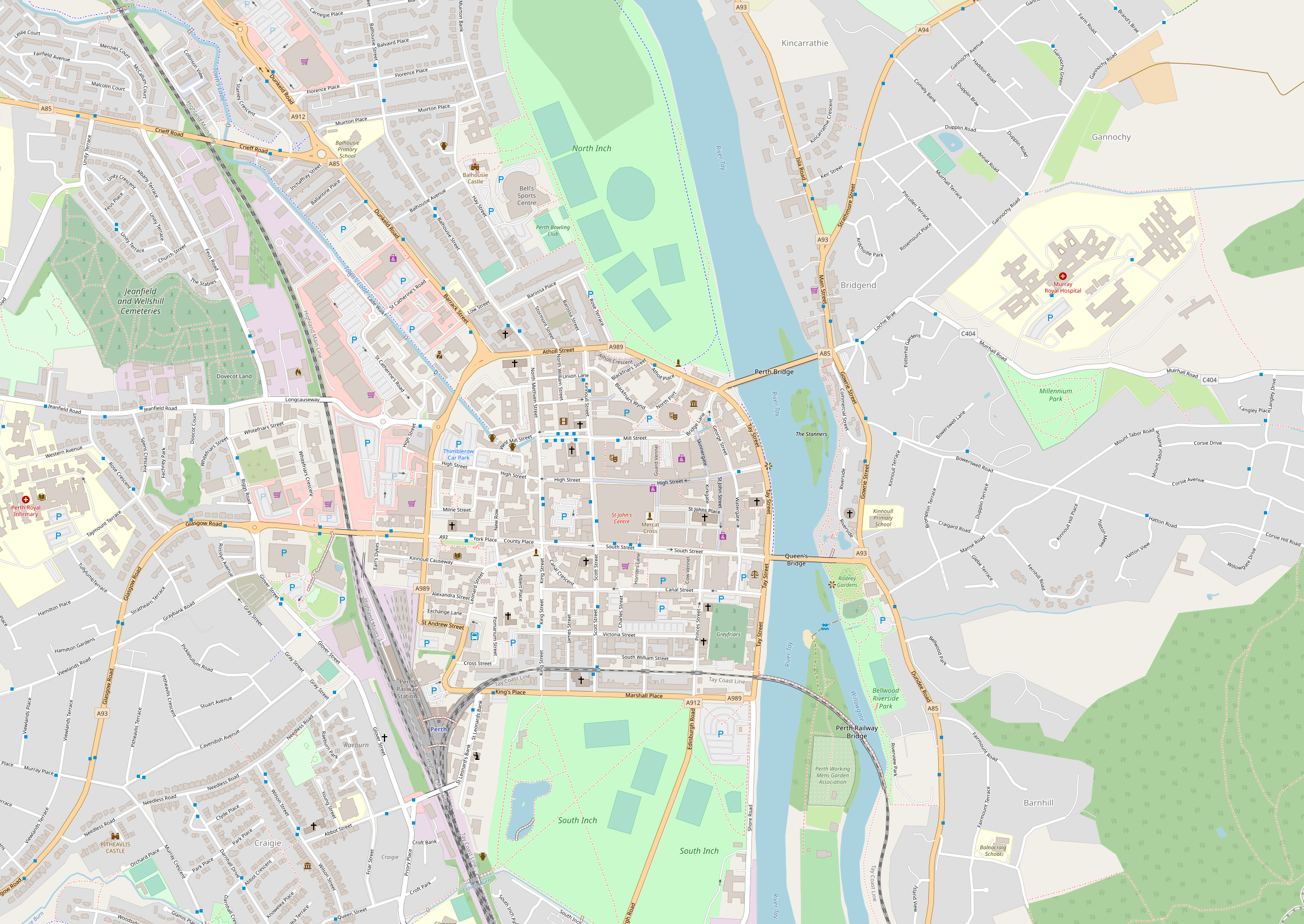
- Shown in Perth
- 56.395342°N 3.425969°W
- Location: 46–52 Tay Street, Perth

History
- Built: 1870 (156 years ago)

Site notes
- Architect: Andrew Heiton

Listed Building – Category B
- Designated: 20 May 1965
- Reference no.: LB39657

46–52 Tay Street is an historic row of buildings in Perth, Scotland. Believed to have been designed by local architect Andrew Heiton, the building is Category B listed, dating to 1870. Standing on Tay Street, the building has "Gowrie House" in stencilling on the southern portion of its façade, referencing where that building partially once stood.

== See also ==
- List of listed buildings in Perth, Scotland
