= St Luke's Church, Broughty Ferry =

St Luke's Church
- St Luke's and Queen Street Church
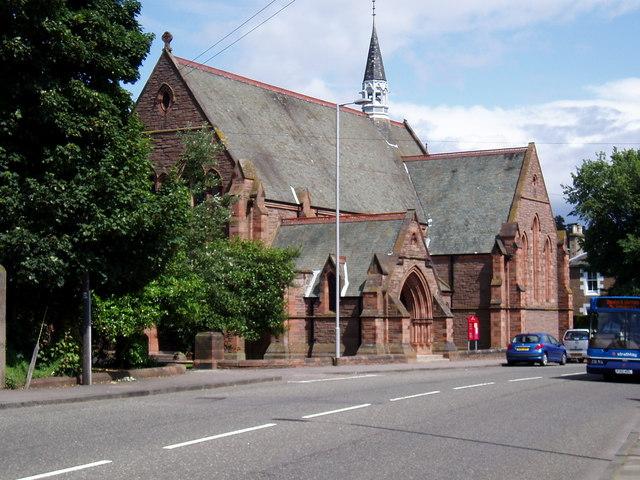

- Location of St Luke's within Dundee
- 56.4695°N 2.8834°W
- OS grid reference: NO457312
- Location: Broughty Ferry, Dundee
- Country: Scotland
- Denomination: Church of Scotland

History
- Dedication: Luke the Evangelist

St Luke's & Queen Street Church is a congregation of the Church of Scotland in Broughty Ferry, on the edge of Dundee, Scotland. The church building was completed in 1884 to designs by Edinburgh architect Hippolyte Blanc, and is now protected as a category A listed building.

== History ==
St Luke's was established as a congregation of the Free Church of Scotland in 1878, and worshipped in an iron building now in use as the church hall. The Free Church merged with the United Presbyterian Church of Scotland in 1900, and then these merged with the Church of Scotland in 1929. In 1953, the congregation of St Luke's was united with that of Queen Street Church.
