= Tay Street =

Street in Perth, Scotland

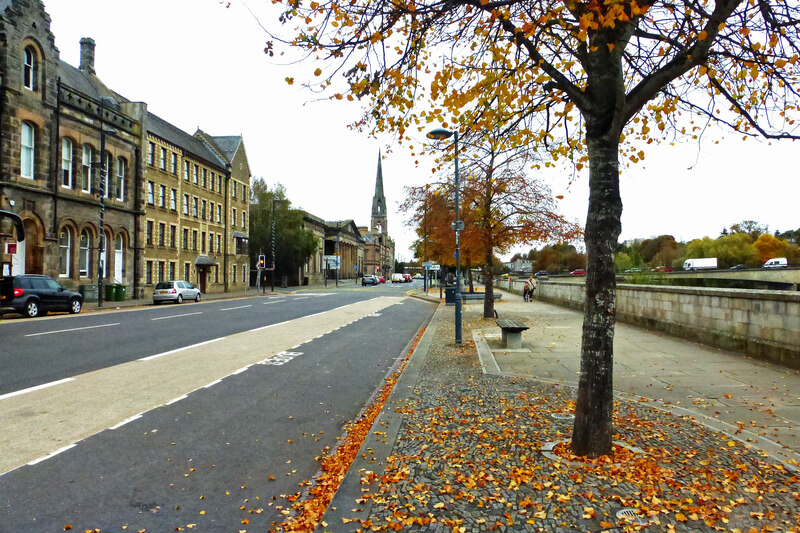
- Looking north in 2025, with the County Buildings and St Matthew's Church in view
- Interactive map of Tay Street
- Part of: A989
- Length: 0.47 mi (0.76 km)
- Location: Perth, Perth and Kinross, Scotland
- North end: West Bridge Street and Charlotte Street
- Major junctions: High Street; South Street; Canal Street
- South end: Marshall Place and Shore Road

Construction
- Completion: c. 1870

Tay Street is a street, part of the A989, in the Scottish city of Perth, Perth and Kinross. Planned in 1806 and completed around 1885, it is named for the River Tay, Scotland's longest river, on the western banks of which it sits. The street runs from the confluence of West Bridge Street and Charlotte Street in the north to a roundabout at Marshall Place and Shore Road in the south. Three of the city's four bridges that cross the Tay do so in this stretch (from north to south): Perth Bridge (also known as Smeaton's Bridge), Queen's Bridge and the single-track Tay Viaduct, carrying Perth and Dundee trains to and from Perth railway station, located 1/2 mile (800 metres) northwest.

Thomas Hay Marshall and his father-in-law Thomas Anderson (owner of the former Blackfriars lands), who were responsible for the construction of much of Georgian Perth, made the first steps in the creation of Tay Street in the late 18th century when they constructed Atholl Crescent and Atholl Street in the north and Marshall Place in the south. The sections in between were gradually filled in over the course of the next century.

"A curving line of elegant buildings," Tay Street links the city's two main parks, the North Inch and the South Inch.

Water Vennel, one of Perth's many vennels, leads between Tay Street and Watergate.

== Notable buildings ==
A map of 1832, by James Gardner, showing Tay Street had not yet been laid out. It does appear in a 1901 map, however

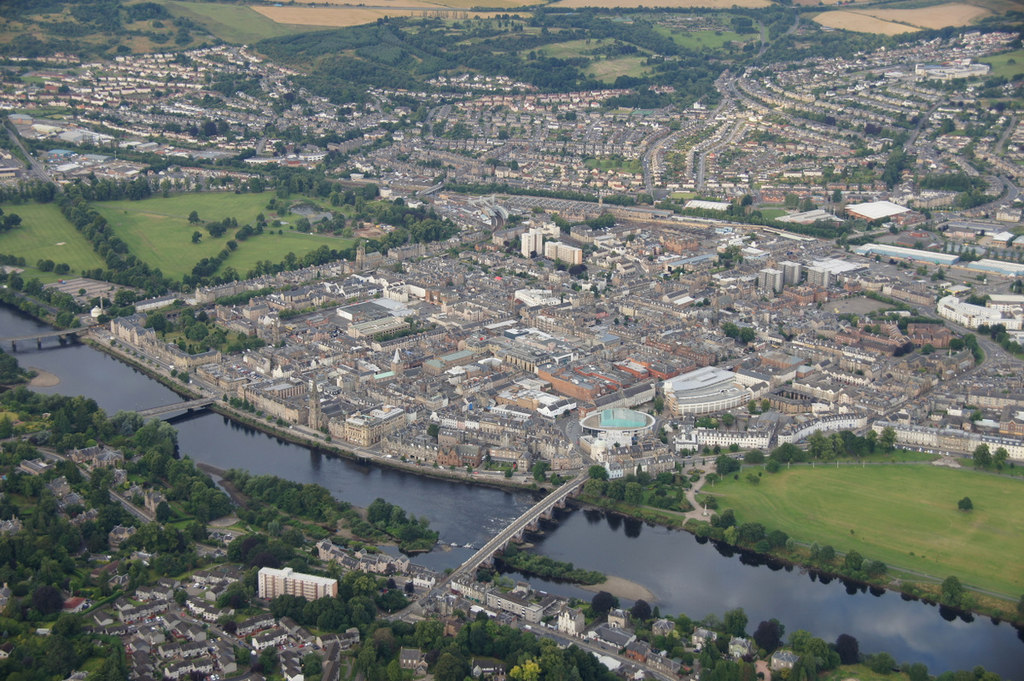
Tay Street and the city to its west. The South Inch and North Inch are also in view on the left and right, respectively

Located along the western side of the street's 0.47 miles (0.76 km) course are several notable buildings dating from the 19th century, designed by several of Scotland's leading architects. The below, ordered from north to south, are all listed structures at Historic Environment Scotland.

- 2 Tay Street
- Royal George Hotel – has an entrance from Tay Street
- Former Middle Church and halls, 4–6 Tay Street
- Municipal Buildings, 1–5 High Street and 8–18 Tay Street
- 2 High Street – has an entrance from Tay Street
- St Matthew's (formerly West) Church
- 26 Tay Street – formerly Perth Savings Bank
- Victoria Buildings, 36–44 Tay Street
- "Gowrie House", 46–52 Tay Street
- Sheriff Court, former site of Gowrie House, 46–52 Tay Street
- County Buildings, 62–72 Tay Street
- Perth Water Works, now The Fergusson Gallery; address is Marshall Place, but it its eastern elevation is on Tay Street

Although not a listed structure, situated immediately to the north of the railway bridge is the former Volunteer Drill Hall.

Perth Baptist Church formerly stood at the southern corner of Tay Street and Canal Street. Built on the site of Perth Opera House, it was destroyed in a fire in 1984. A modern building now stands in its place. The Baptists moved a new building in the Letham area of the city.

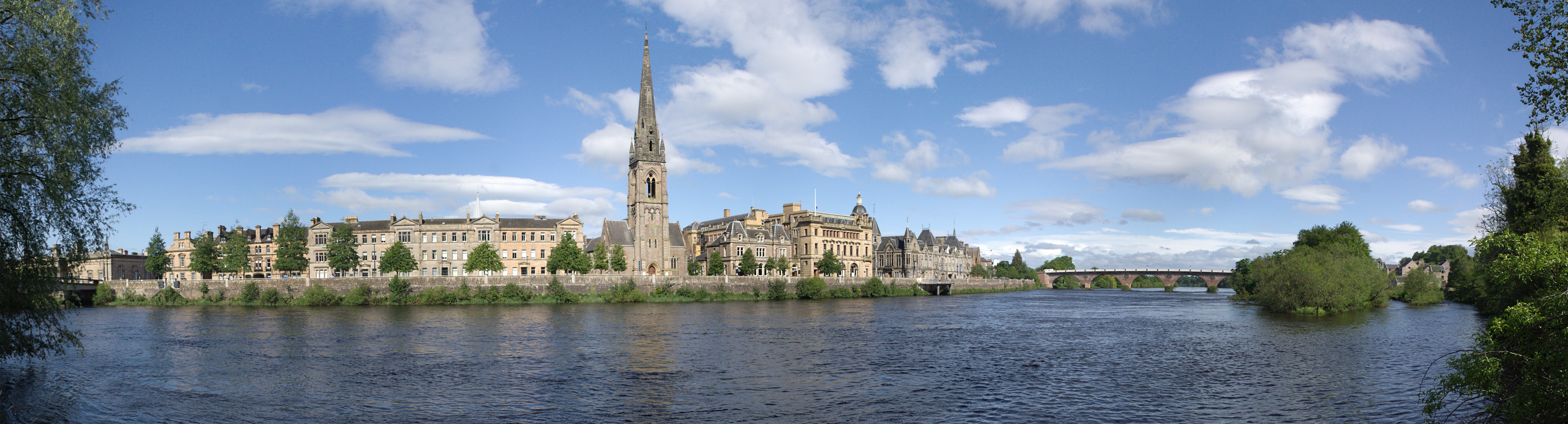

=== Architects ===
Robert Smirke designed the Sheriff Court and County Buildings, which were built in 1819.

Glasgow's John Honeyman designed St Matthew's Church, by far the most prominent structure on the street, erected in 1871.

Perth architect Andrew Heiton was responsible for 26 Tay Street, completed around 1873, the Victoria Buildings, dating to 1872, 46–52 Tay Street (possibly), completed in 1870, and the municipal building that runs between 8 and 18 Tay Street, which were built in 1881.

David Smart designed the building at 1–3 South Street, at the corner of Tay Street, which was built between 1863 and 1866. His office was located in the Victoria Buildings at 42 Tay Street.

John Young's effort was Perth's former museum building, built between 1879 and 1881, which adjoins Greyfriars Burial Ground. The building was extended in 1895, and a fire in 1987 resulted in the northern end being demolished and rebuilt.

George Penrose Kennedy Young designed the municipal building at the corner of 2 High Street, which was erected in 1899. His firm also designed the extension of the fire-damaged Perth Museum.

== Images ==
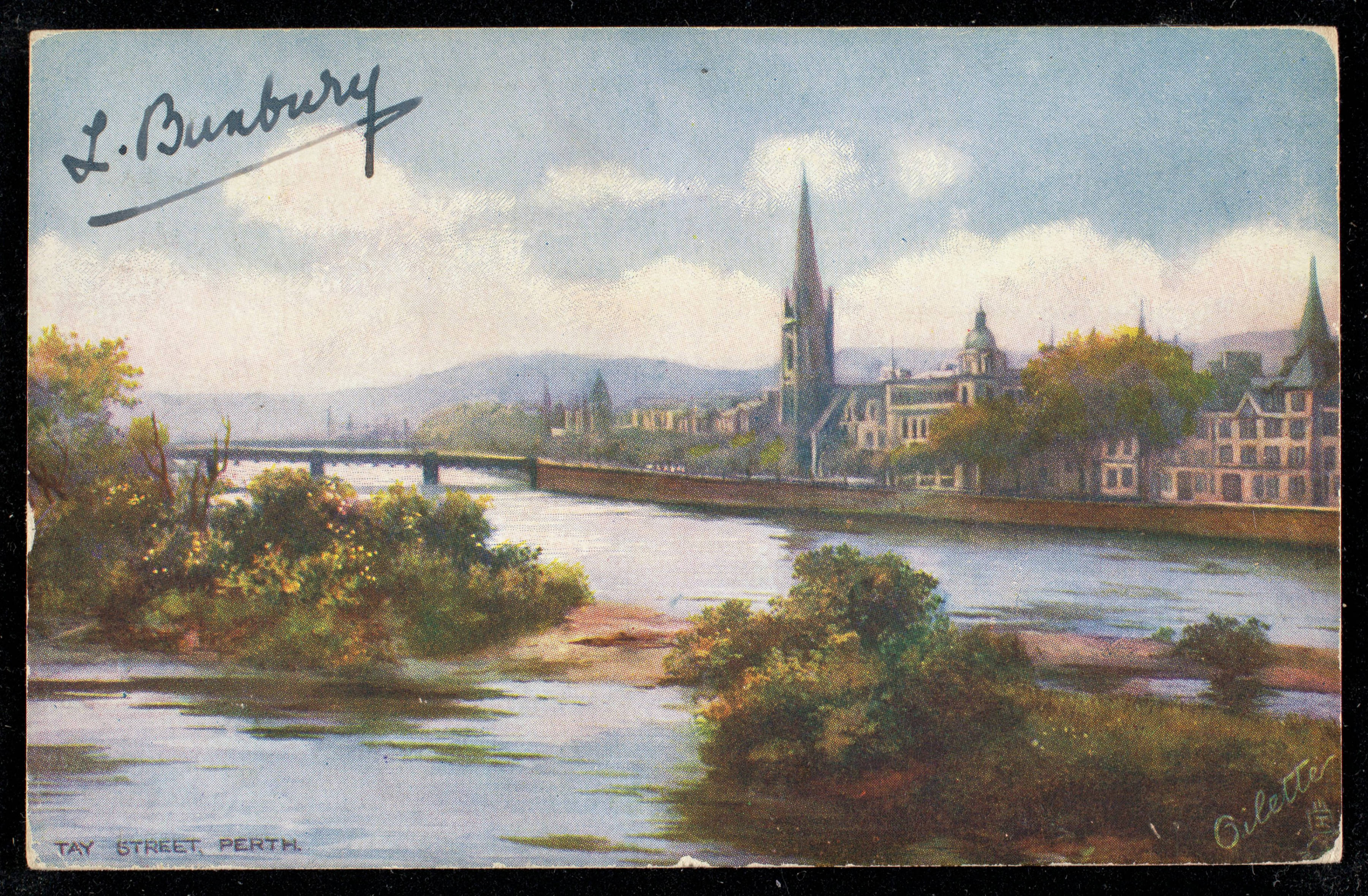
Tay Street in a 1903 postcard

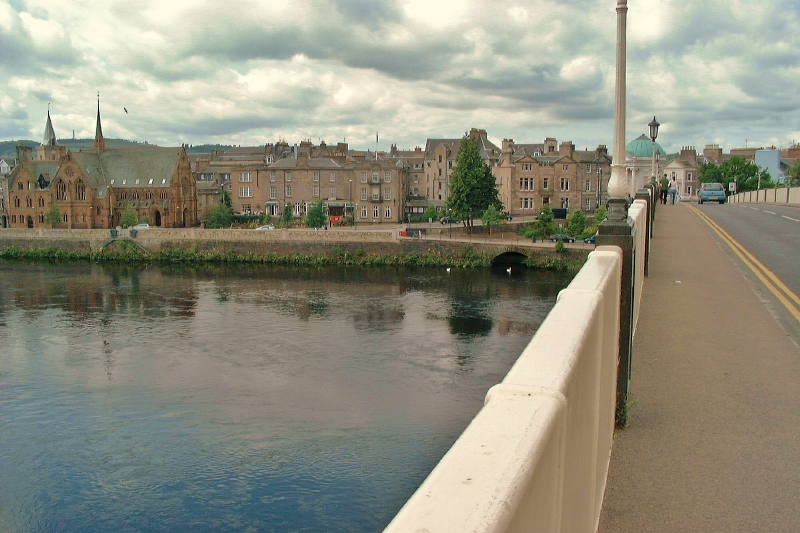
The northern end of Tay Street, viewed from Perth Bridge

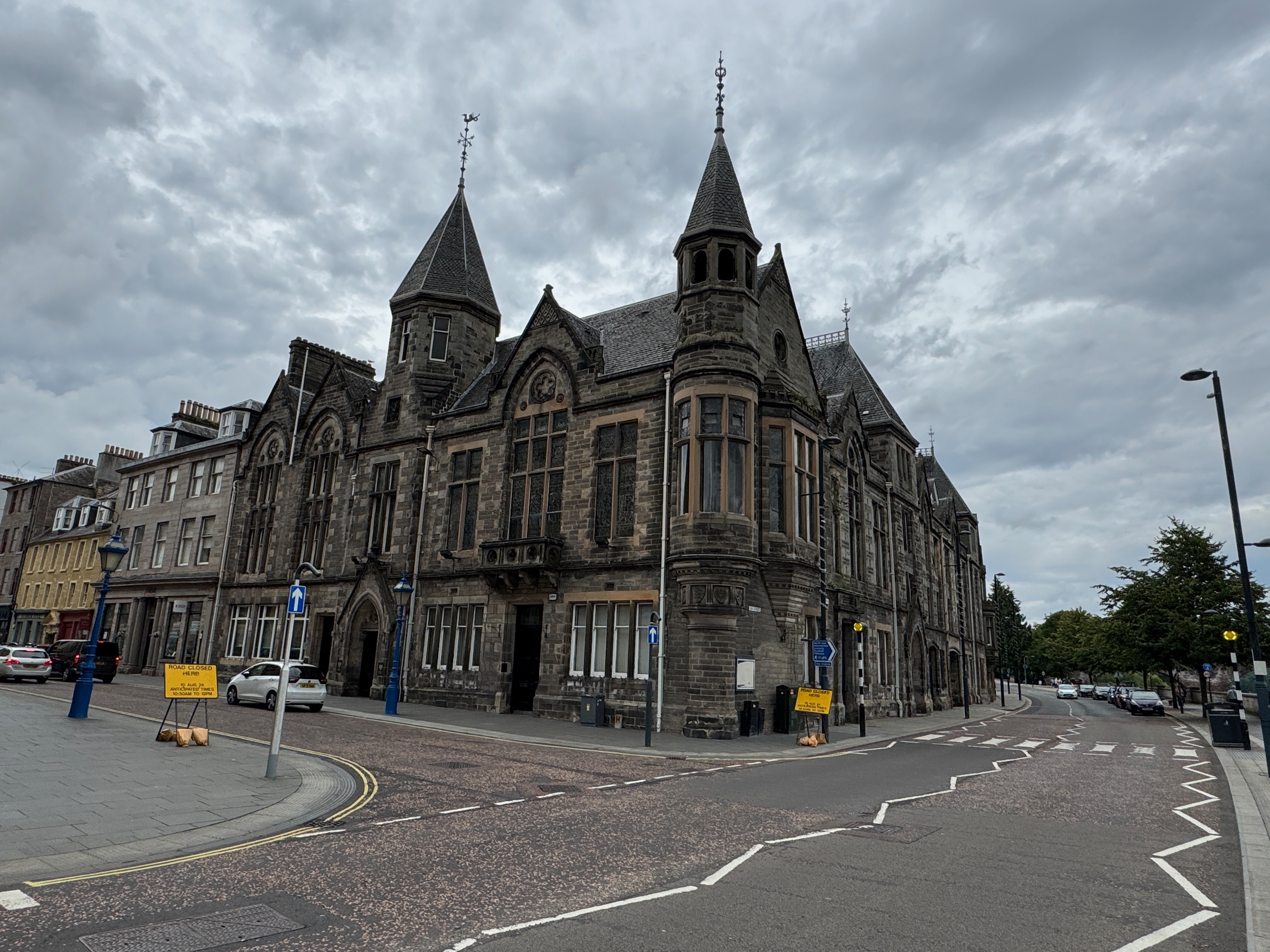
Municipal building at 8–18 Tay Street

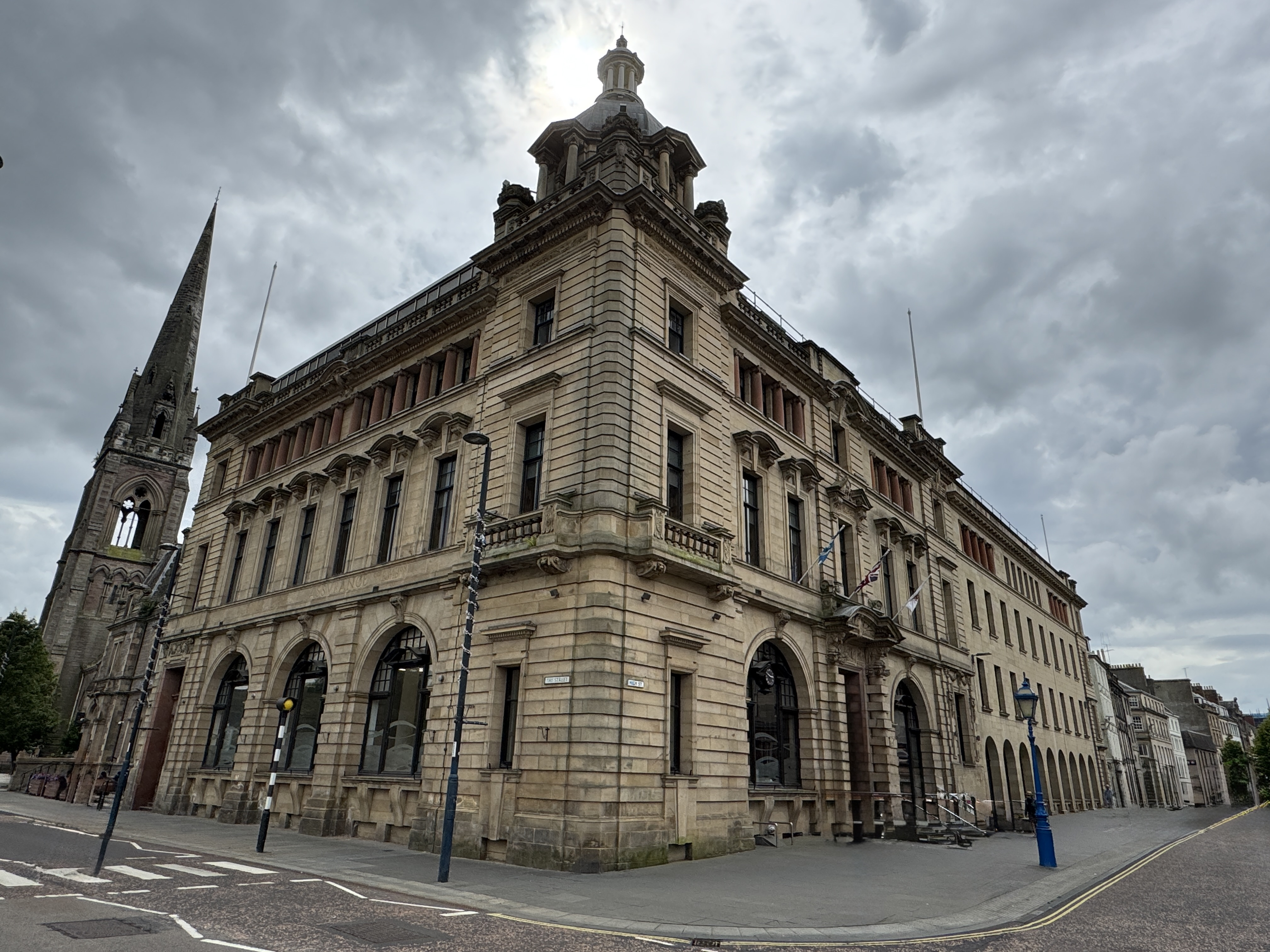
2 High Street

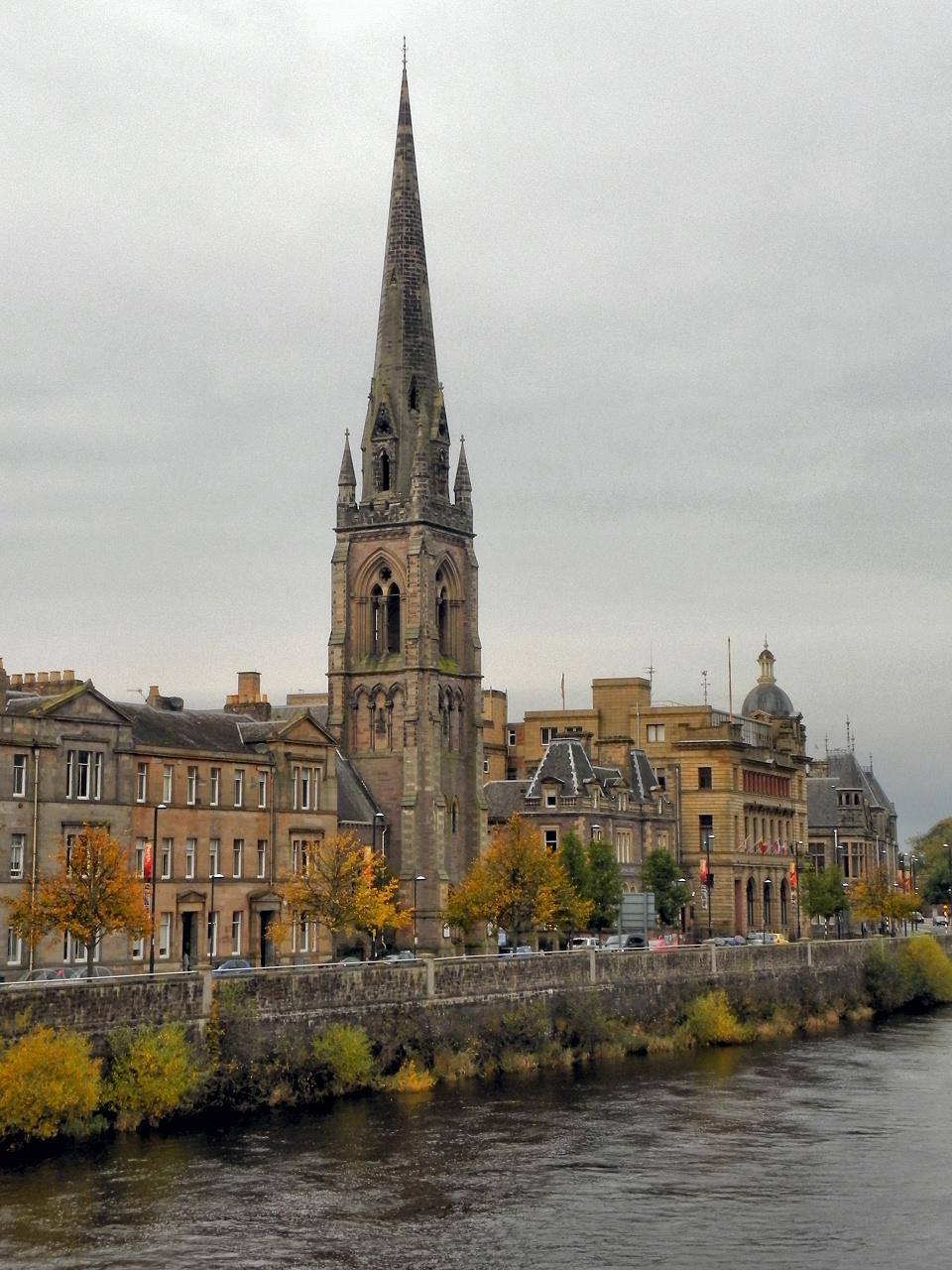
St Matthew's Church, roughly in the middle section of Tay Street

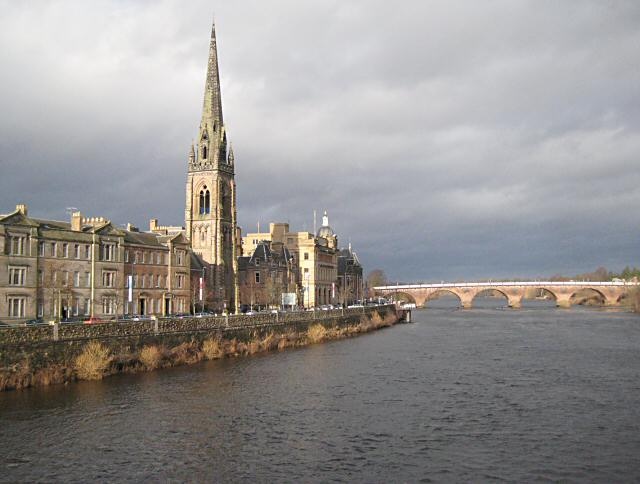
Perth Bridge in view at the northern end of the street

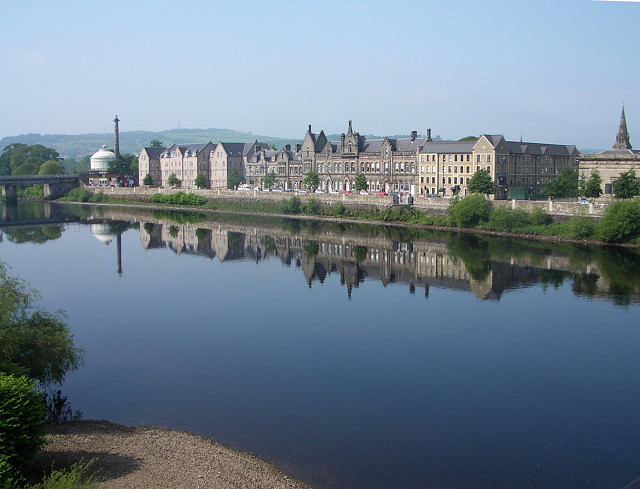
View from Perth Bridge

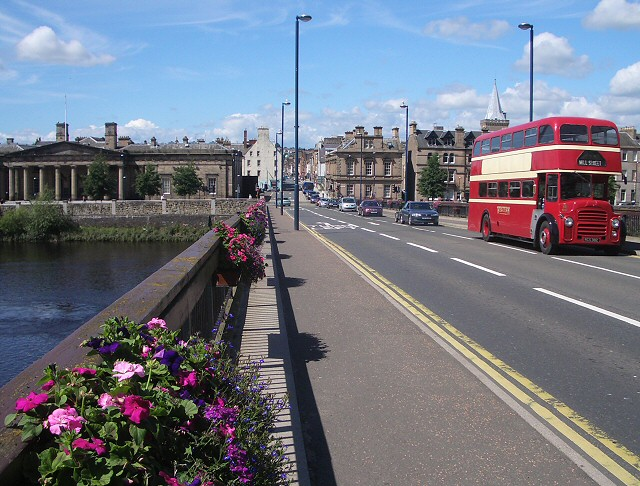
Queen's Bridge, looking between the Sheriff Court and 1–3 South Street

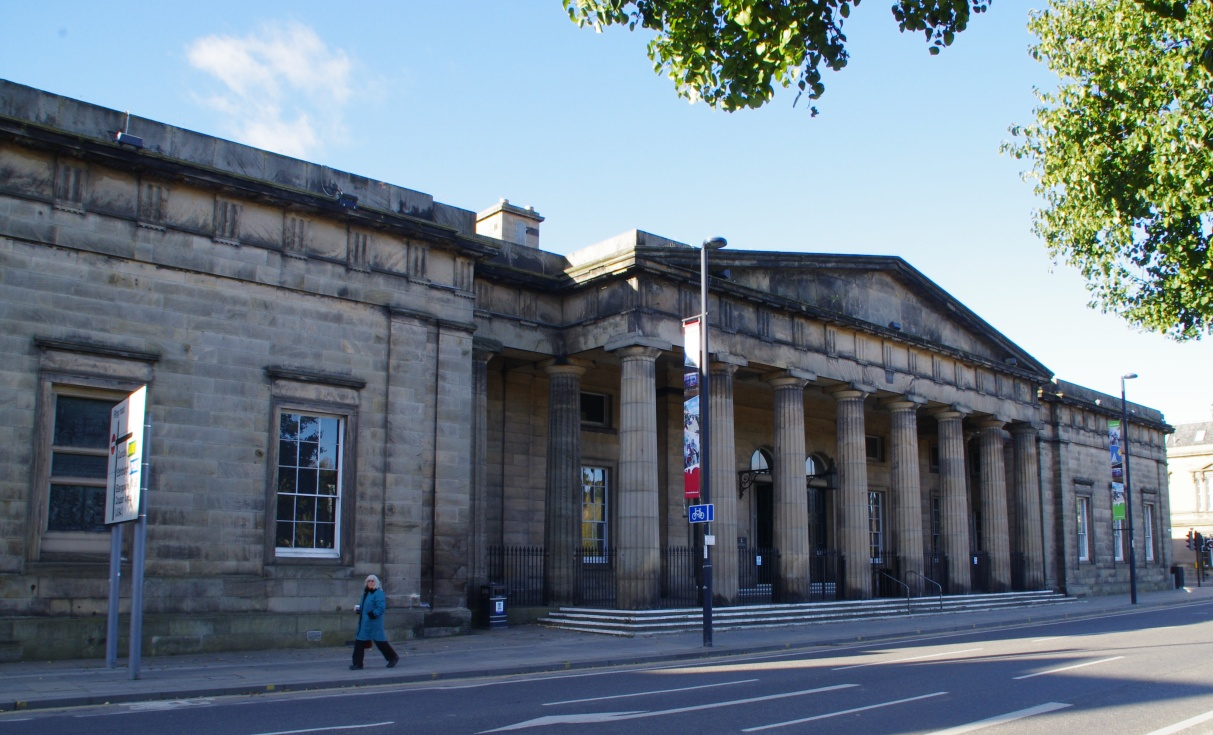
Perth's Sheriff Court

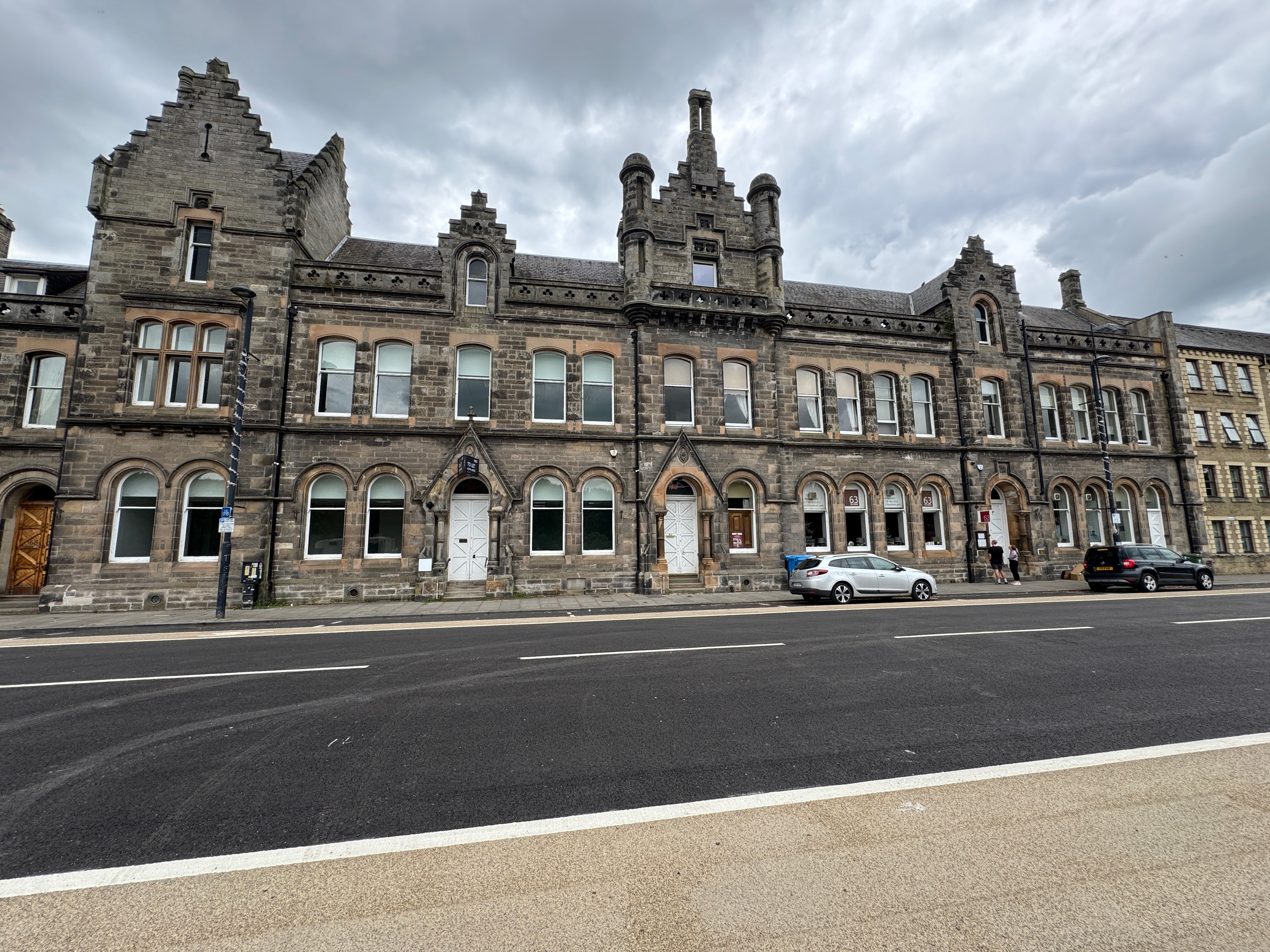
County Buildings, 62–72 Tay Street, formerly the home of Perth Museum

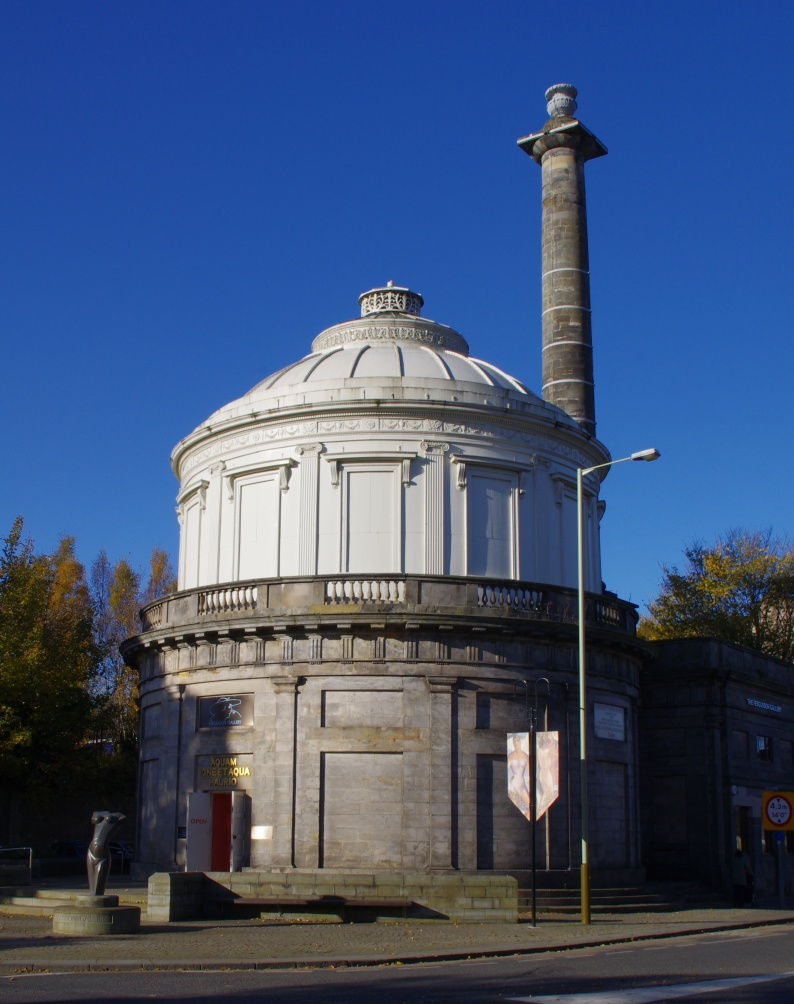
Former Perth Water Works building, now a gallery for the art of J. D. Fergusson
