= 2 High Street, Perth =

Municipal building in Perth, Scotland

2 High Street
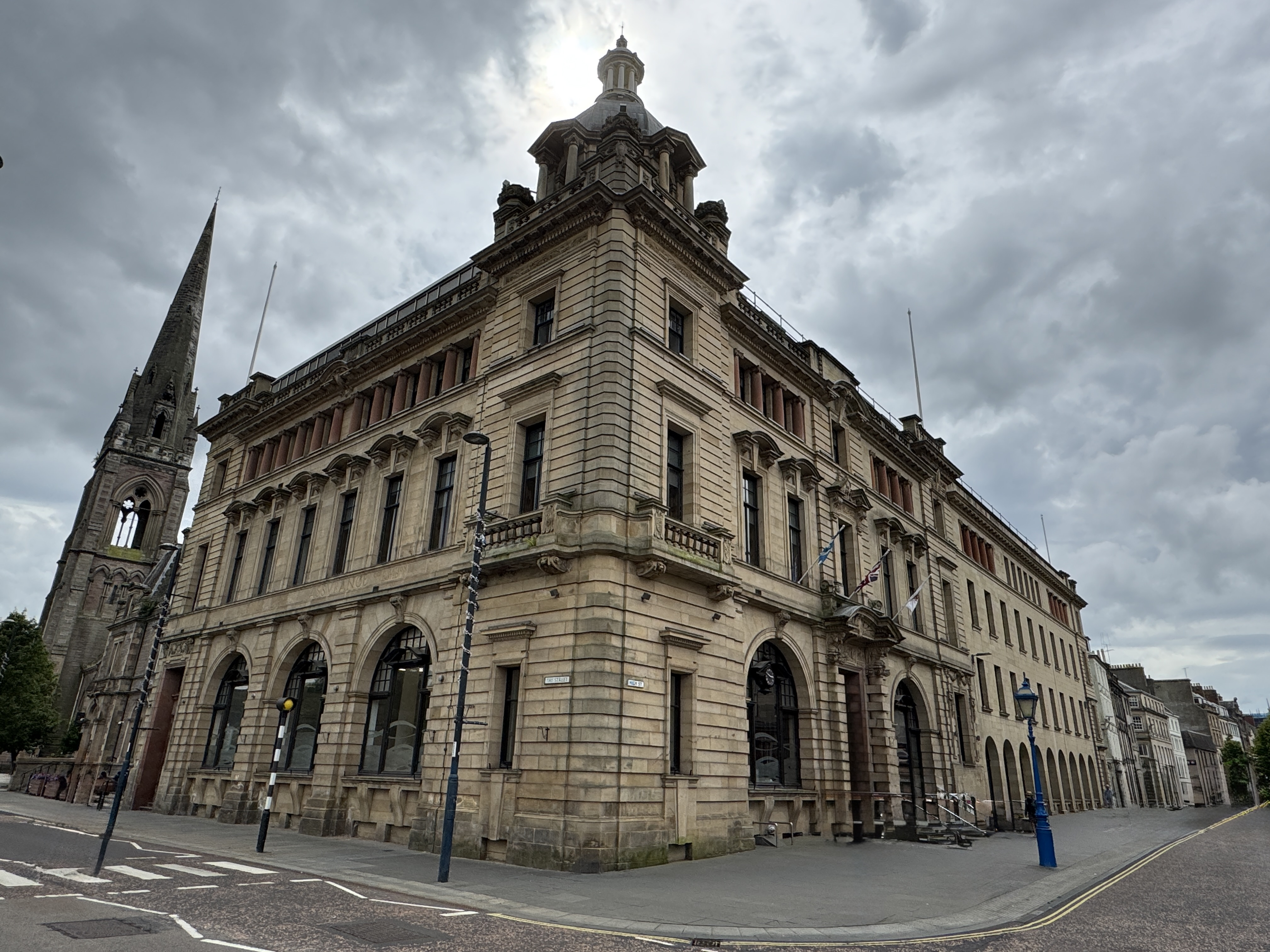
- A 2024 view from Tay Street

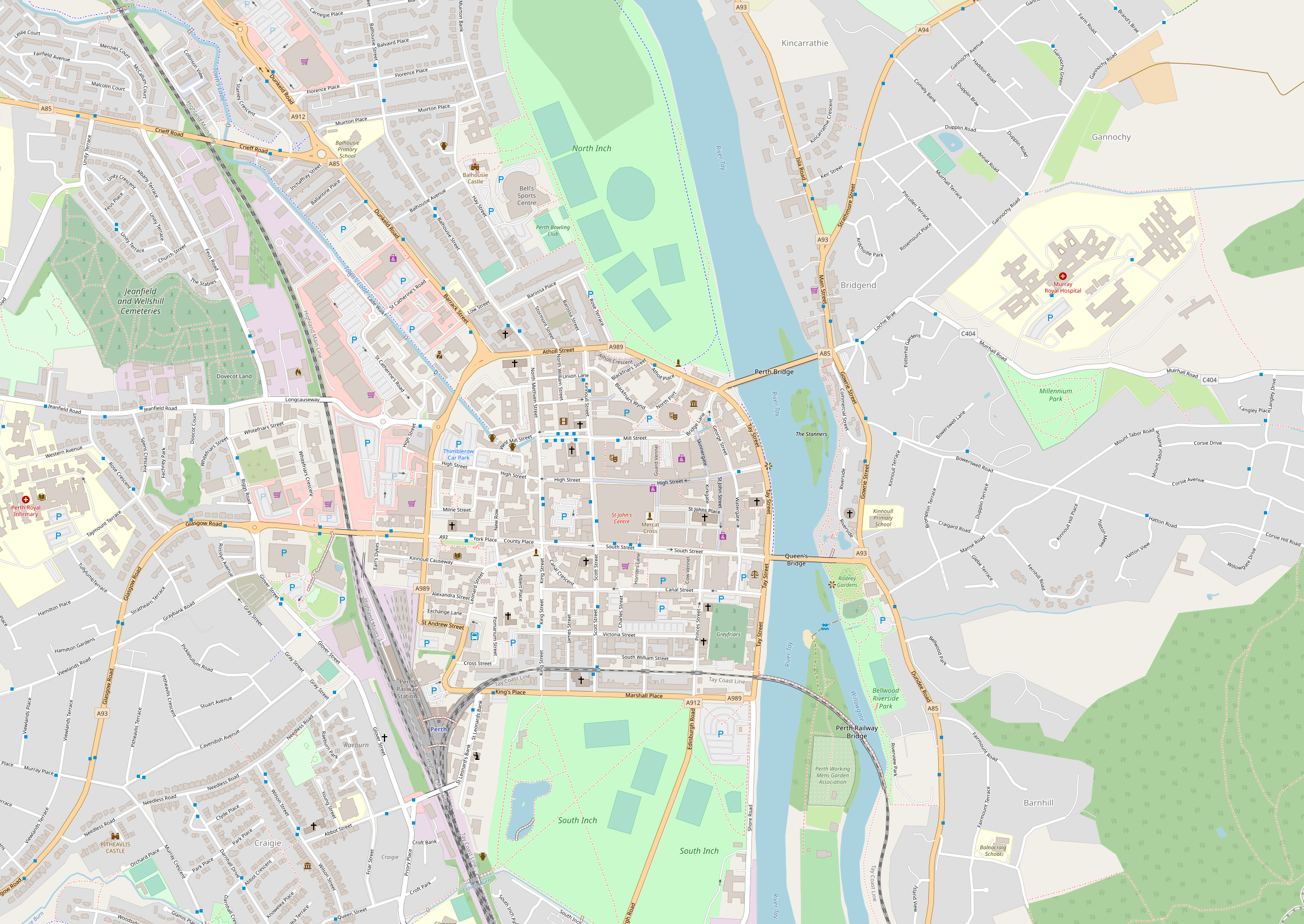
- Shown in Perth
- 56.3967°N 3.4261°W
- Location: 2 High Street, Perth

History
- Built: 1901 (125 years ago)

Site notes
- Architect: George Penrose Kennedy Young
- Architectural style: Renaissance style

Listed Building – Category B
- Designated: 26 August 1977
- Reference no.: LB39469

2 High Street is a municipal building in Perth, Scotland. Standing at the corner of High Street and Tay Street, the building is currently the home of offices of Perth and Kinross Council, which also occupies the municipal buildings at 1 Tay Street directly opposite. The building is Category B listed.

== History ==
The General Accident and Employers' Liability Assurance Association was founded in the city in 1885. Shortly after it was founded the directors decided to commission a purpose-built head office: the site they chose was occupied by a post office.

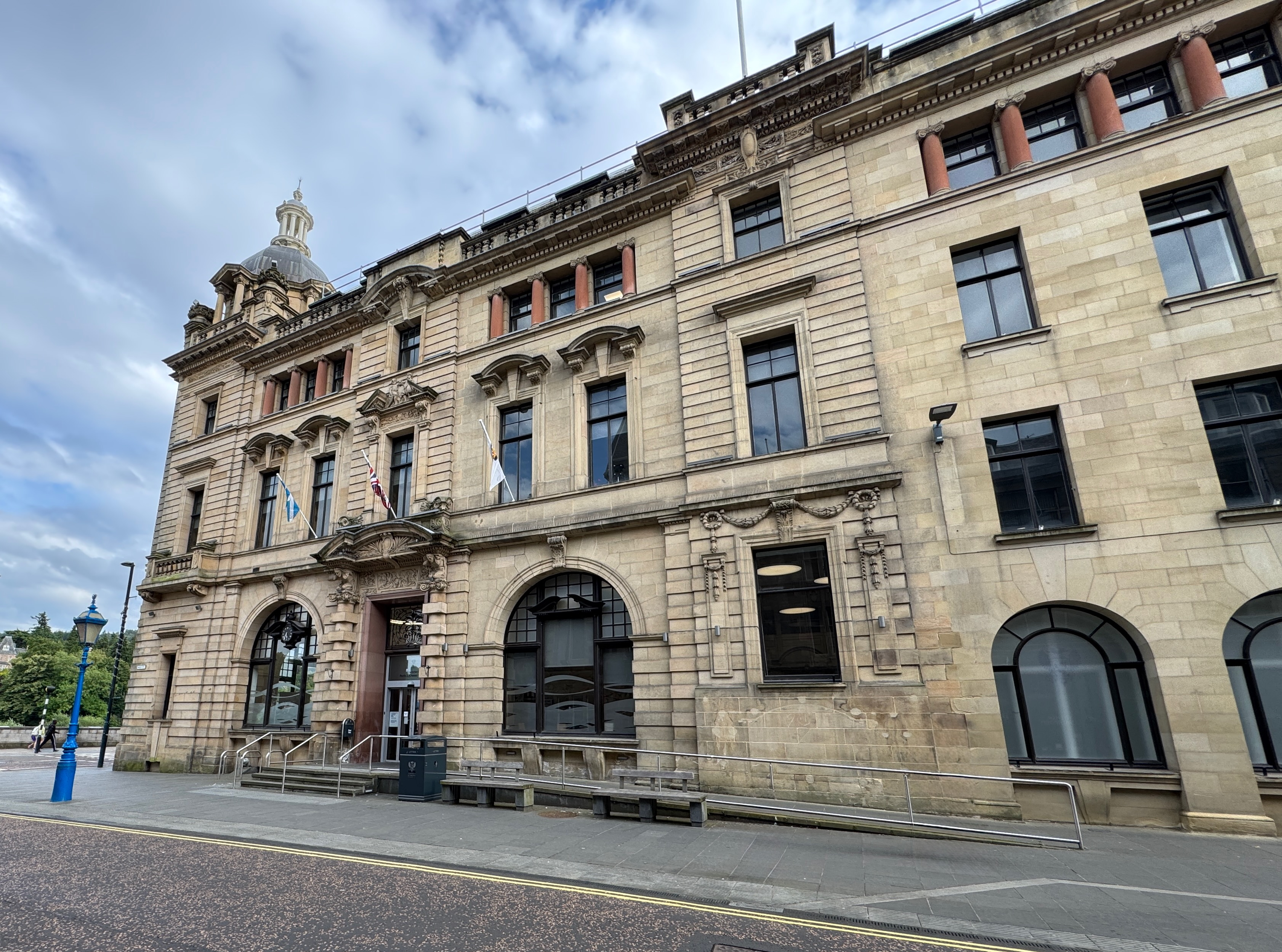
High Street elevation

The building was designed in 1899 by George Penrose Kennedy Young in the Renaissance style, built in ashlar stone and was completed in 1901. The design involved a symmetrical main frontage with five bays facing onto the High Street with the end bays slightly projected forward; the central bay, which also slightly projected forward, featured an elaborate doorway with Ionic order columns capped by crouching figures supporting a carved entablature and an open pediment with a cartouche in the tympanum. On the ground floor, the bays flanking the central bay were fenestrated by large round headed windows and there were narrow casement windows beyond that. The first floor was fenestrated with square headed windows with keystones and pediments while the second floor was fenestrated by recessed sash windows flanked by short Ionic order columns. At roof level, in the northeast corner there was an aediculed drum surmounted by a dome. Internally, the principal rooms were the general manager's office and the boardrooms which were all panelled with mahogany.

The building was extended along the High Street by ten extra bays to the west in a similar style in 1958. A number of older properties were demolished to facilitate the expansion: in the 19th century that part of the High Street had been occupied by a property which accommodated the Scoon and Perth Freemans' Lodge.

The building was vacated by General Accident when it moved to a new head office at Necessity Brae in Pitheavlis in 1984. Later that year, the building became the headquarters of Perth and Kinross Council when the council moved from the aging Municipal Buildings at Nos. 1, 3 and 5 High Street. Staff also moved from the County Offices in York Place.

No. 2 High Street was extensively refurbished at a cost of £10 million in 2015; the works included the relocation of the council chamber from the top floor to the ground floor, as well provision of an energy-efficient external lighting system.

Located close to the River Tay, the building suffered severe flooding and was also hit by lightning in August 2020.

== See also ==
- List of listed buildings in Perth, Scotland
