= St Matthew's Church, Perth =

St Matthew's Church
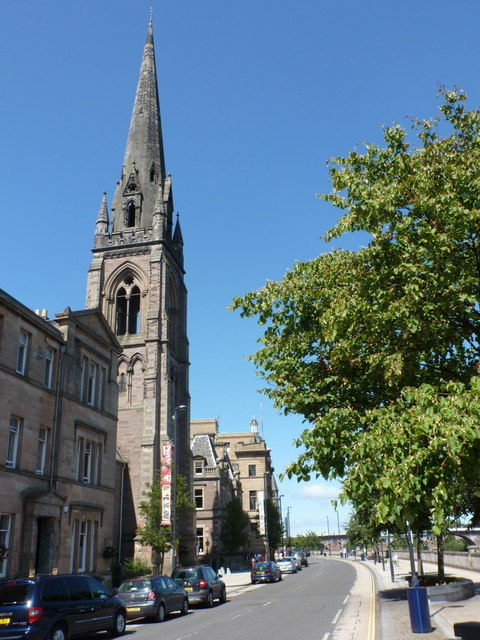
- The church in 2011
- St Matthew's Church
- 56°23′47″N 3°25′33″W
- Location: Perth, Perth and Kinross
- Country: Scotland
- Denomination: Church of Scotland
- Website: Official website

History
- Former name(s): Free Church, West Church
- Status: Active
- Dedication: St Matthew

Architecture
- Functional status: In use
- Heritage designation: Category B listed building
- Designated: 20 May 1965
- Architect: John Honeyman
- Architectural type: Ecclesiastical
- Years built: 1870–1871
- Groundbreaking: 19 May 1870
- Completed: November 1871

St Matthew's Church (formerly Free Church and West Church) is a Church of Scotland church in the Scottish city of Perth, Perth and Kinross. Located on Tay Street, overlooking the River Tay, it is just east of the city centre. Designed by John Honeyman, the church was completed in November 1871 and is a Category B listed building.

In 1965, the four congregations of Wilson Church, Scott Street Church, West and Middle Church, and Bridgend Church were merged to form St Matthew's.

The church celebrated its 150th anniversary in November 2021.

== Prominence ==
The church's prominent location on the banks of the River Tay has made it one of the most frequently photographed landmarks in Perth, Scotland. It is often featured in images of the city, particularly from the viewpoint of Queen's Bridge. The church has also been depicted in several paintings, including one by 19th-century artist Alexander McLauchlan.

== See also ==
- List of listed buildings in Perth, Scotland
