= Municipal Buildings, Perth =

Municipal building in Perth, Scotland

Municipal Buildings
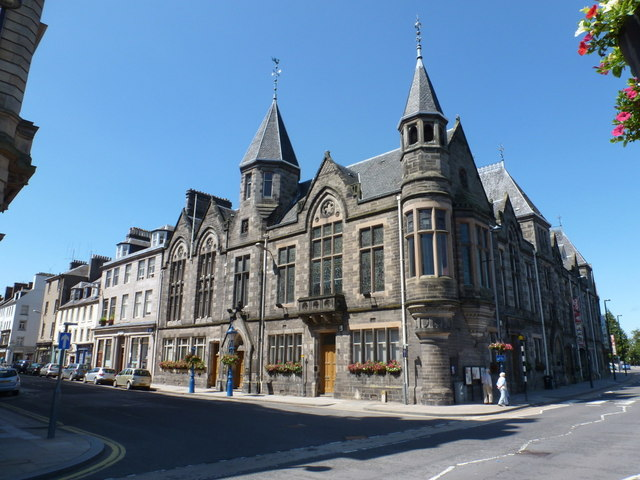
- A 2011 view from Tay Street

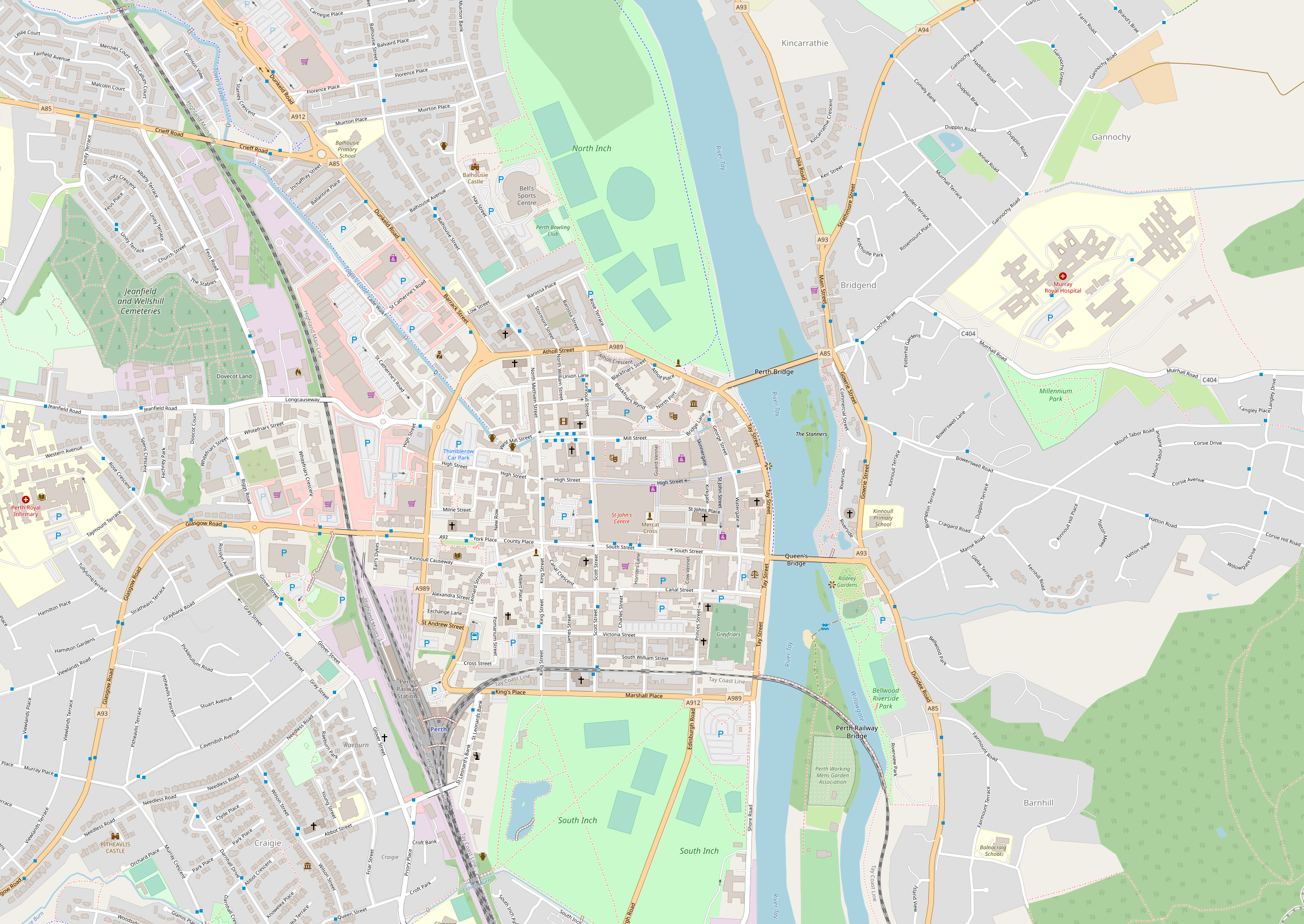
- Shown in Perth
- 56.3971°N 3.4263°W
- Location: Perth

History
- Built: 1881 (145 years ago)

Site notes
- Architect(s): Andrew Heiton and Andrew Granger Heiton
- Architectural style: Gothic Revival style

Listed Building – Category B
- Designated: 26 August 1977
- Reference no.: LB39320

The Municipal Buildings are a municipal facility at Nos. 1, 3 and 5 High Street, Perth, Scotland. The facility is a Category B listed building.

== History ==
The building stands on the site formerly occupied by the Old Chapel of Our Lady. The facility replaced the old city chambers, which had been completed at the east end of the High Street, close to the River Tay, in 1696. After the old city chambers became very dilapidated, civic leaders decided to procure new municipal buildings on the site. The building was adjoined to the north in 1887 by Perth Middle Church, which filled the remainder of the block to George Inn Lane.

== Design and construction ==
The foundation stone for the new building was laid by the Earl of Kinnoull with full masonic honours in 1878. The building was designed by Andrew Heiton and Andrew Granger Heiton in the Gothic Revival style and completed in 1881. The design involved an asymmetrical main frontage with six bays facing High Street; the central section featured a gabled doorway on the ground floor; there was a tall window on the first floor with coat of arms and a turret above; there was also a slim tower at the south east corner of the building which was based on the design of the tower of the chapel at St Mary's Monastery, Kinnoull, which had also been designed by Andrew Heiton. The municipal buildings were badly damaged in a fire on 23 January 1895 and, although the fire-proof record room survived, much of the structure had to be rebuilt in a programme of works which was completed in 1896. The building contains five stained-glass windows: three depict scenes from Sir Walter Scott's 1828 novel The Fair Maid of Perth, one is of Queen Victoria and her husband, Albert, Prince Consort, and the other is a representation of Robert the Bruce storming Perth's defensive walls in 1312. The first four were gifts of lord provosts of Perth, while the other was a gift of Sir Robert Pullar and James Pullar, in memory of their father, lord provost John Pullar.

A stone engraving above the southernmost door on the Tay Street elevation reads: "This House Loves Peace • Hates Knaves • Crimes Punisheth • Preserves The Laws And Good Men Honoureth".

The building before it was rebuilt after the fire of 1895, viewed from Tay Street

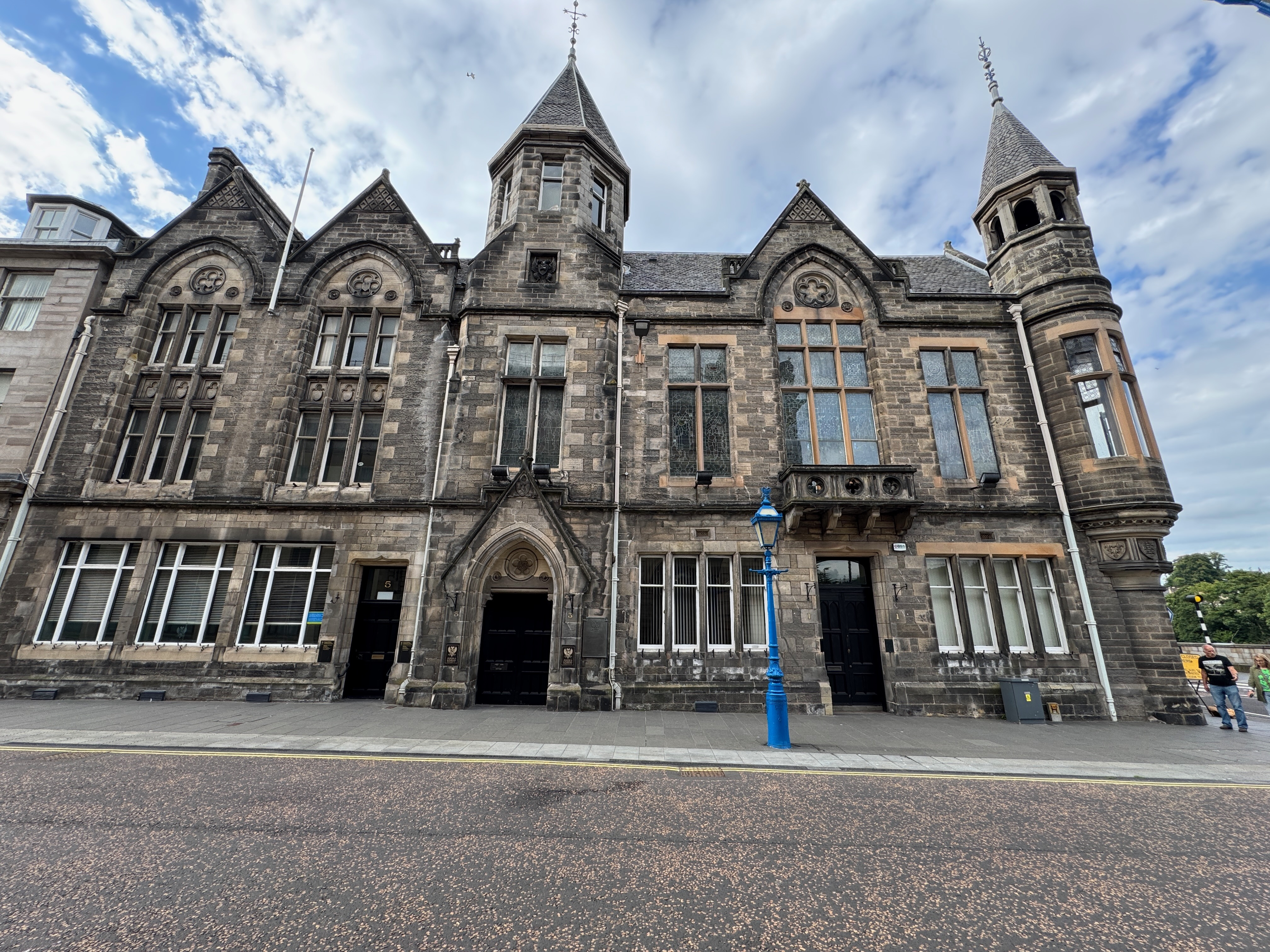
High Street elevation

== Usage ==
The municipal buildings served as the headquarters of Perth Royal Burgh Council, until the council was replaced by Perth and Kinross District Council under the wider Tayside Regional Council in May 1975. The buildings then remained the headquarters of Perth and Kinross District Council until the council moved across the road to new facilities in the former head office of General Accident at 2 High Street in 1984. Staff also moved from the County Offices in York Place.

The northern part of the building, which faced Tay Street, was developed for residential use in the late 1980s but the remainder of the property continued to be used by the council for administrative purposes until 2011. In March 2020 the Council started a consultation on converting that part of the property that had been used for administrative purposes and which has been vacant since 2011, into a boutique hotel.

== See also ==
- List of listed buildings in Perth, Scotland
