= St Leonard's Nunnery =

Nunnery in Perth, Scotland

Coordinates: 56.3903°N 3.4393°W

Also known as St Leonard's Hospital

St Leonard's Nunnery was a house of Augustinian canonesses at Perth, Scotland, founded in the 13th century. After King Edward I of England's foray in Scotland in 1296, the Prioress swore fealty to him. The convent was annexed to the Carthusian Monastery at Perth by 1434 and was suppressed in 1438. The nunnery stood opposites the railway lines across the rail bridge from Craigie Cross, around 0.5 miles (0.80 km) southwest of the Perth city centre.

Elizabeth Dunbar, daughter of George I, Earl of March, was a prioress of the convent in the 14th-15th century.
