= Thomas Anderson (landowner) =

Scottish landowner

- Anderson pictured around 1790
- Born: 1740
- Died: 15 July 1808 (aged 67–68)
- Occupation: landowner
- Relatives: Thomas Anderson Sr (father)

Thomas Anderson (born 1740) was an extensive landowner in Perth, Scotland, in the 18th century. Along with Thomas Hay Marshall, his son-in-law and future lord provost of Perth, he was responsible for the construction of much of Georgian Perth.

== Career ==
Anderson's acreage in Perth included the former Blackfriars land. He purchased half of the land from a Mrs Miller. With his son-in-law Thomas Hay Marshall, he began the first steps towards creating Tay Street when, in the late 18th century, they laid out Atholl Crescent and Atholl Street in the north and Marshall Place in the south. The sections in between were gradually filled in over the course of the next century.

Anderson was a trustee and commissioner of a project to build a new Tay bridge in 1765, employing the engineer John Smeaton. Trials were made by John Gwin. Anderson contributed £21 to a bridge fund in 1776.

== Personal life ==
Anderson was born in 1740 to Thomas Anderson Sr and Sarah Rose.

Anderson's daughter, Rosie, married Thomas Hay Marshall in 1792. Rose Terrace in Perth is now named for her. She was later adulterous, resulting in Marshall divorcing her in 1803, after eleven years of marriage.
