= Rosie Anderson =

- Born: c. 1776
- Spouse: Thomas Hay Marshall (married 1792–1803)
- Relatives: Thomas Anderson (father); Sarah Rose (mother)

Rosie Anderson (born c. 1776) was a figure in 18th- and 19th-century Scotland. She was the daughter of landowner Thomas Anderson, who, along with his son-in-law, Thomas Hay Marshall, was responsible for the construction of much of the Georgian architecture of Perth. Rose Terrace in Perth is now named for her.

== Personal life ==
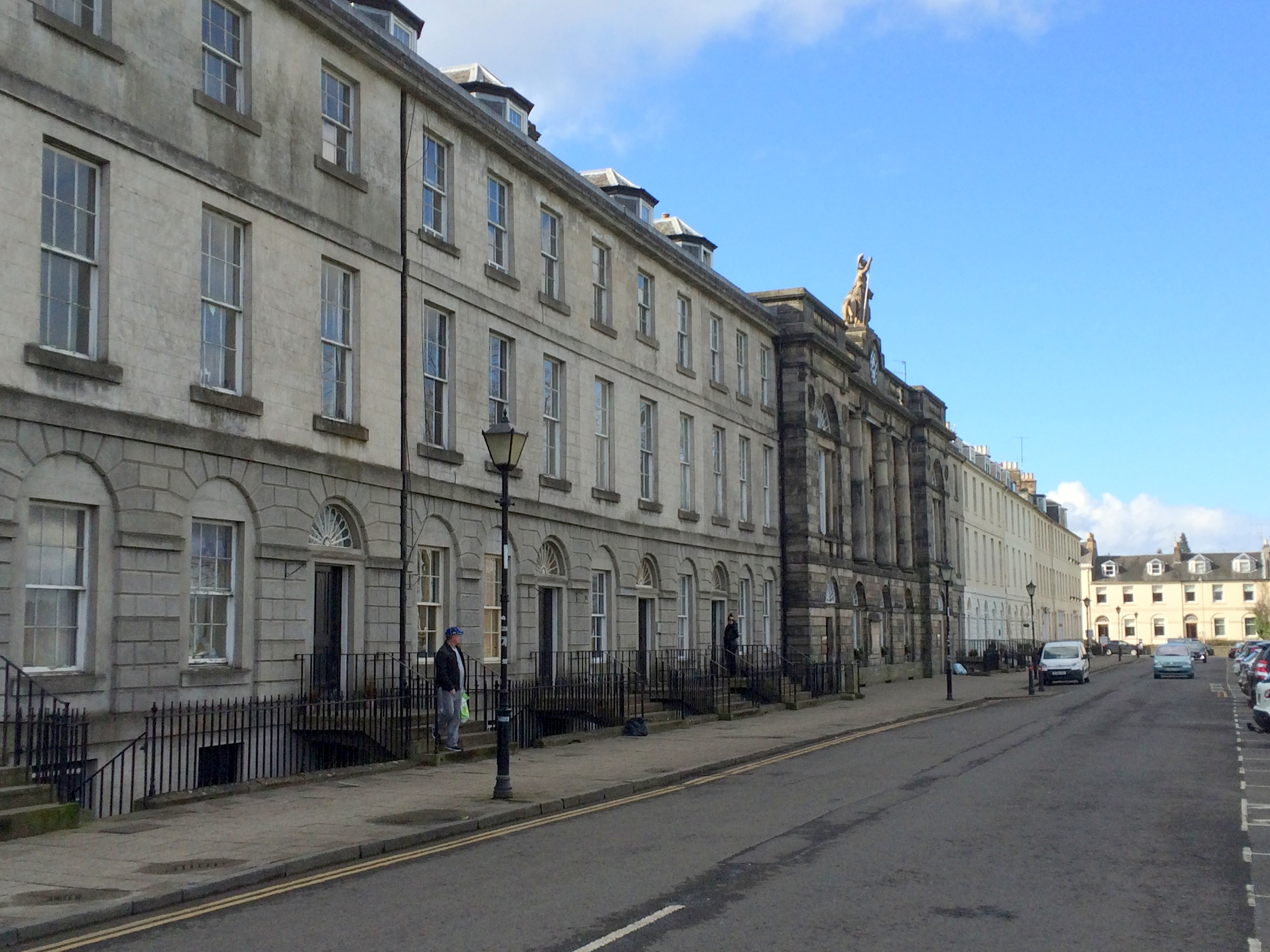
Rose Terrace was named for Anderson by her husband during their short marriage

Anderson was born to Thomas Anderson and Sarah Rose.

On 6 February 1792, at the age of sixteen, she married Thomas Hay Marshall, with the promise of a dowry of £3,000. Anderson's husband named Perth's Rose Terrace for her. The couple lived at the corner of Rose Terrace and Atholl Street. Their marriage was brief, Rosie having had an affair with Thomas Bruce, 7th Earl of Elgin, who lived across Charlotte Street from the newlyweds' home. It is believed that when Hay Marshall was away from home, the Earl and Anderson "exchanged signals from their windows, sent each other frequent notes, and... [he] visited her late at night, when they sat together in the gloaming, refused to have candles brought and even blocked up the keyholes so that they should not be watched."

She was also adulterous with a Dr Harrison, medical officer of the Durham Rangers.

Marshall first "raised letters of inhibition" against his wife on 2 June 1796. They divorced in November 1803, after eleven years of marriage, although it took two attempts due to Marshall's providing insufficient evidence of said adultery. Even while he was building his case, the defendant was sleeping with several officers, one of whom testified in court that he had "enjoyment of her person".

The proceedings gave way to several Scots ballads, including "Rosey Anderson":

There was an Assembly into Perth, and Rosey she was there,

Lord Elgin danced with her that night, and did her heart ensnare, Lord Elgin danced with her that night, she walked home on his arm,

Hay Marshall he came rushing in, in very great alarm.

Thomas Hay Marshall died in 1808, aged 38. He was living alone at Whistlecroft on the eastern side of the River Tay. He was also in debt, according to several sources. Anderson went to live with her parents in Edinburgh, her father's fortune having suffered from the decline in Perth's linen trade. She continued to "have liaisons with officers from a fort or battery between Newhaven and Leith". She later moved to London, where she had a son and spent time in Bethlehem Hospital, a psychiatric institution.
