= Elizabeth Douglas =

Elizabeth Douglas may refer to:

- Elizabeth Douglas, (Fl.1427-1494)
- Elizabeth Douglas, Countess of Erroll (fl. 1590–1631), Scottish aristocrat and poet
- Elizabeth Douglas Van Buren (1881–1961), British archaeologist
- Elizabeth Douglas-Home (1909–1990), spouse of the Prime Minister of the United Kingdom from 1963 to 1964
- Elizabeth Varley (1909–2002), born Elizabeth Susan Douglas-Scott-Montagu, English actress and writer
- Elizabeth Douglas-Hamilton, Duchess of Hamilton (1916–2008), British noble
