= Marshall Place =

Prominent street in Perth, Scotland

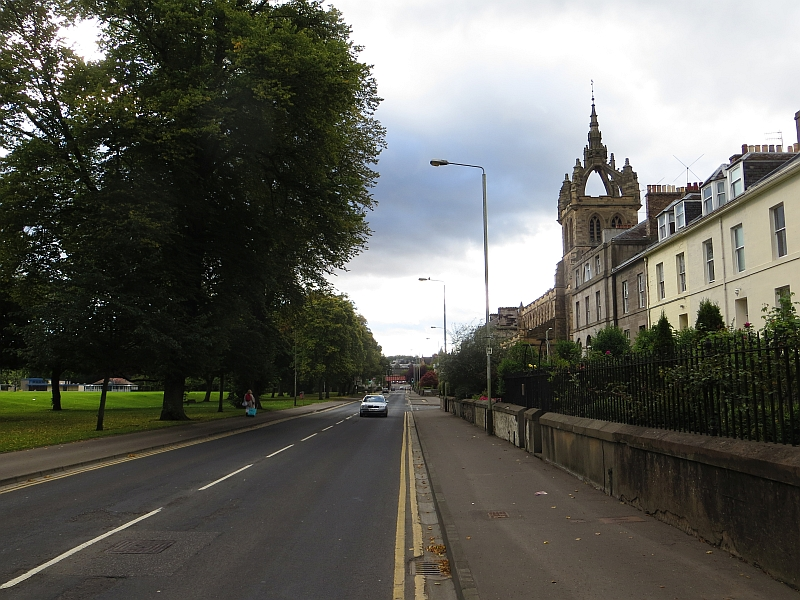
- Looking west along Marshall Place. The northern edge of the South Inch is on the left; St Leonard's-in-the-Fields Church is on the right, at the junction with Scott Street
- Part of: A989
- Length: 0.23 mi (0.37 km)
- Location: Perth, Perth and Kinross, Scotland
- East end: Tay Street (A989) and Shore Road
- West end: King's Place (A989)

Marshall Place is a prominent street in the Scottish city of Perth, Perth and Kinross. Commissioned in 1801, and today part of the A989, the Perth Inner Ring Road, it runs for about 0.23 miles (0.37 km), from a roundabout it shares with Tay Street and Shore Road in the east to a convergence with King's Place in the west.

The street is named for Thomas Hay Marshall, twice lord provost of Perth in the early 19th century. Marshall and his father-in-law, Thomas Anderson (owner of the former Blackfriars lands), who were responsible for the construction of much of Georgian Perth, made the first steps in the creation of Tay Street in the late 18th century when they constructed Atholl Crescent and Atholl Street in the north and Marshall Place in the south. Marshall Place is now lined with townhouses built to take advantage of the view of the South Inch, of which it forms part of the northern boundary.

== Notable locations ==
- St Leonard's-in-the-Fields Church (Category A listed building)
- Statue of Sir Walter Scott (Category C listed building)
- 1–14 Marshall Place (Category B listed buildings)
- 15–28 Marshall Place (Category B listed buildings)

== Junctions ==
From east to west

- Princes Street
- Nelson Street
- Scott Street
