= St Leonard's-in-the-Fields Church =

- St Leonard's-in-the-Fields and Trinity Church (until 2008)
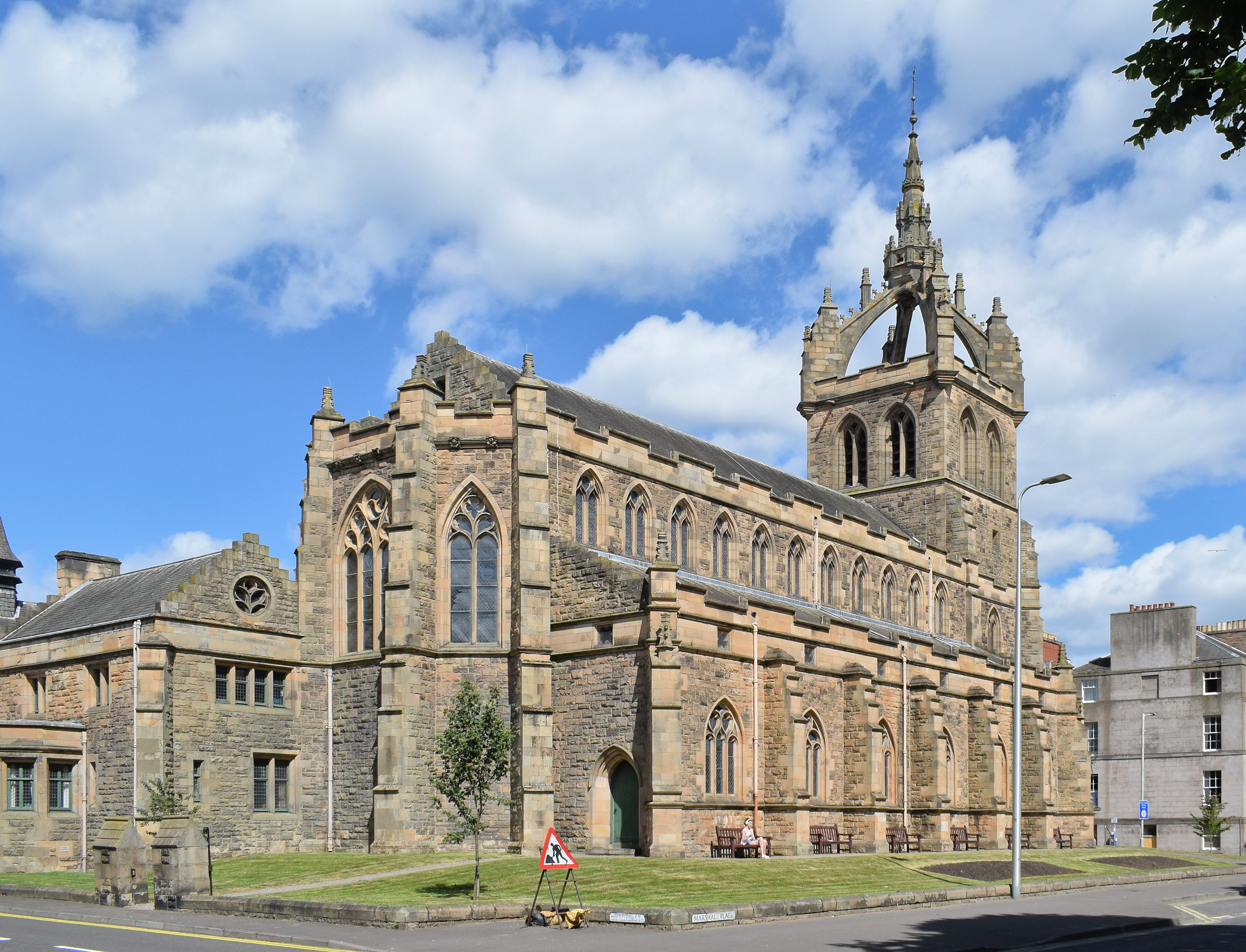
- Viewed from the northern end of the South Inch, looking across Marshall Place
- St Leonard's-in-the-Fields Church
- 56°23′32″N 3°25′58″W
- Location: Marshall Place; Perth
- Country: Scotland
- Denomination: Church of Scotland
- Website: https://slitfperth.co.uk/

History
- Dedication: Saint Leonard

Architecture
- Architect: J. J. Stevenson
- Architectural type: Gothic Revival
- Completed: 1885; 141 years ago

St Leonard's-in-the-Fields Church (formerly St Leonard's-in-the-Fields and Trinity Church) is located in Perth, Scotland. The church stands on Marshall Place at its junction with Scott Street, overlooking the northern end of the South Inch. Built between 1882 and 1885 to a design by J. J. Stevenson, it is now a Category A listed building. A Church of Scotland former place of worship, the building is designed in the Gothic Revival style. The building is no longer used as a place of worship, the last religious service having taken place on 15 November 2026. The congregation amalgamated with Perth North Church in Mill Street.

Inside, the semi-octagonal apse was inspired by the 15th-century apse of the Church of the Holy Rude in Stirling.

Perth photographer Magnus Jackson had a wooden studio on the site between the 1850s and 1884.

The organ, built in 1881 by the London-based company of Perth native Henry Bryceson, was originally installed in the former Morningside United Presbyterian Church. It was moved to St Leonard's-in-the-Fields in 1985 and installed in a modern ash case.

== Gallery ==
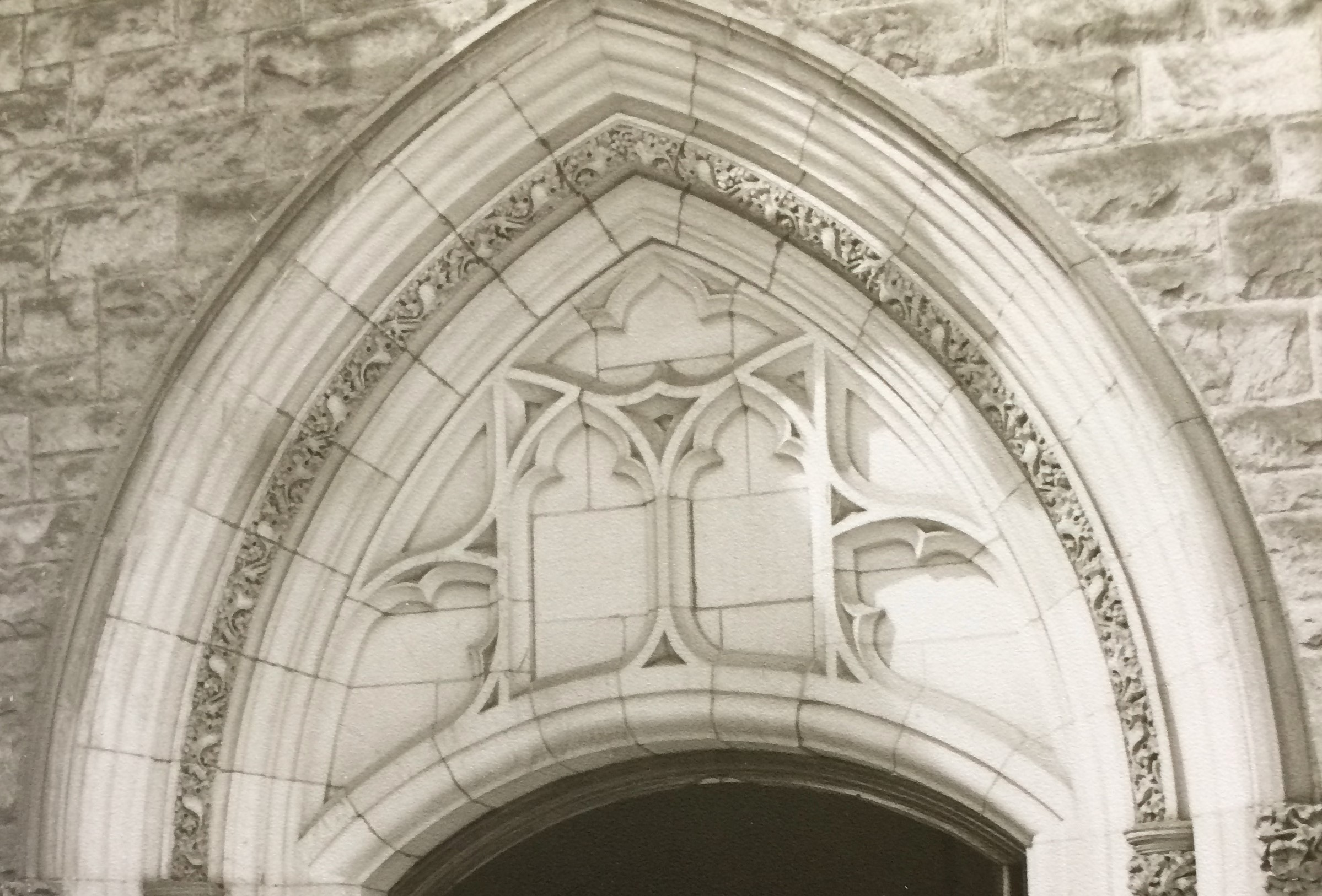
Detail above the main door

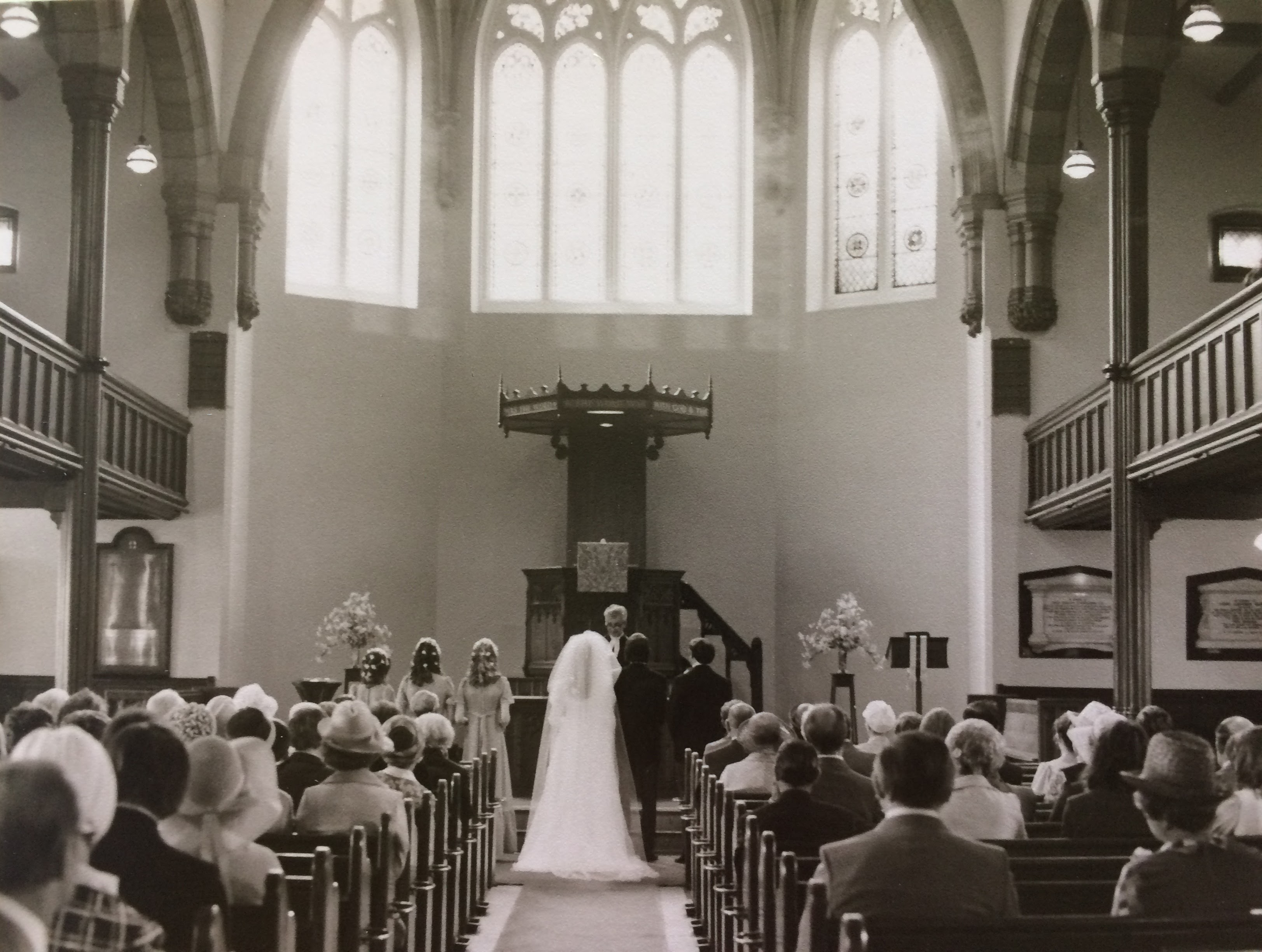
A wedding in the church (1973)

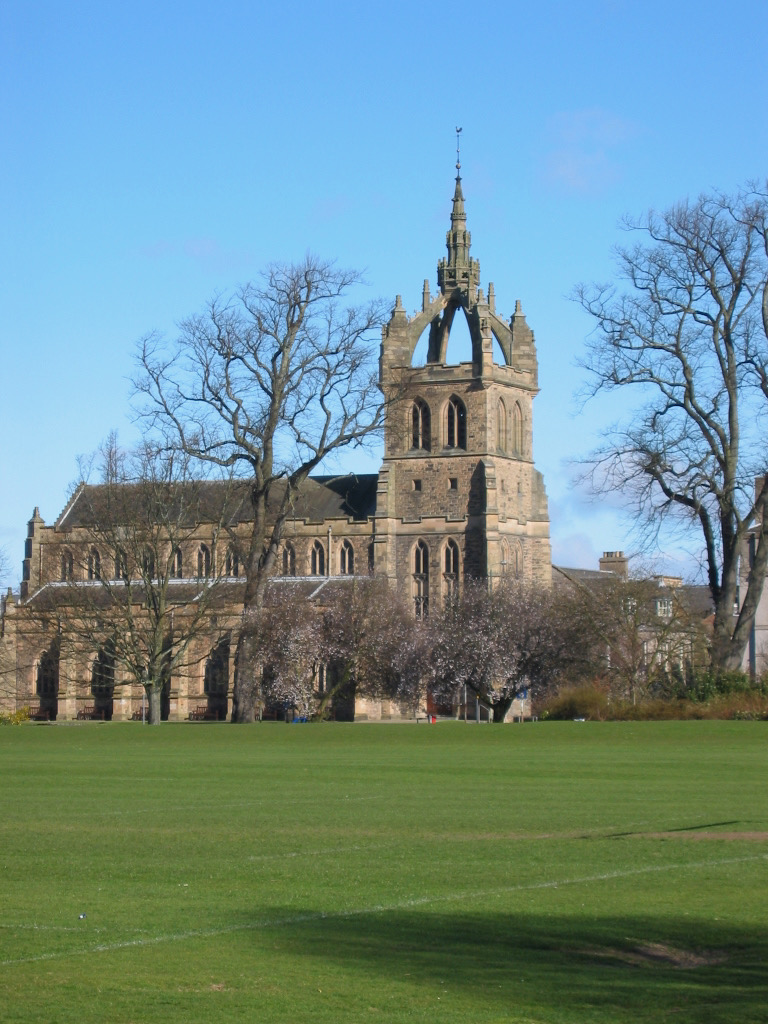
Looking north from the inch

== See also ==
- List of Category A listed buildings in Perth and Kinross
- List of listed buildings in Perth, Scotland
