= Craigie Cross =

Open space in Perth, Scotland

- Maintained by: Perth and Kinross Council
- Location: Perth, Scotland, UK
- Coordinates: 56.389563°N 3.439529°W
- North: St Leonard's Bridge
- East: Priory Place
- West: St Leonard's Bridge

Craigie Cross is a small public square in the Craigie area of Perth, Scotland. Shaped in the form of a scalene triangle, the plot of land, which has been in existence since at least the early 20th century, is bounded by St Leonard's Bridge to the north and Priory Place to the east. A diagonal offshoot of St Leonard's Bridge, running one-way in a southwesterly direction, connects it to Priory Place for a second time. It was down this section that trams of Perth Corporation Tramways used to run from the city centre.

A clock stands in the square on its northern side.

Priory Place recalls the Priory of St Leonard, which was founded in the 13th century, around the same time as St Leonard's Nunnery. It overlooked the southern end of the nearby South Inch from the western side, in the area where St Leonard's Bridge crosses the railway tracks today. It was suppressed in 1429 and its lands and rents were annexed by the Carthusian monastery that had been founded. There was a church dedicated to St Leonard at Perth as early as 1163.

Today, the Cross is known for its plethora of fast food shops.
