= Thomas Hay Marshall =

Lord provost of Perth, Scotland

- Marshall around 1805
- Born: 1770
- Died: 15 July 1808 (aged 38)
- Monuments: Marshall Monument
- Occupation: Lord provost
- Spouse: Rosie Anderson (married 1792–1803)

Thomas Hay Marshall (1770 – 15 July 1808) was twice lord provost of Perth, Scotland. With a passion for Georgian architecture, Marshall is credited with building Perth's "new town" to the north and south of the city centre.

Marshall was involved in the founding of Perth Academy, at its former location in Rose Terrace, and in the design of HM Prison Perth.

A bronze statue of Marshall, designed by David Morison and sculpted by John Cochrane and Brothers in 1822, stands behind four Ionic order columns beside Perth Art Gallery with the Latin phrase cives grati (grateful citizens in English) following his name above the statue.

Marshall Place, which runs along the northern side of the South Inch, is named for him.

== Lord provost ==
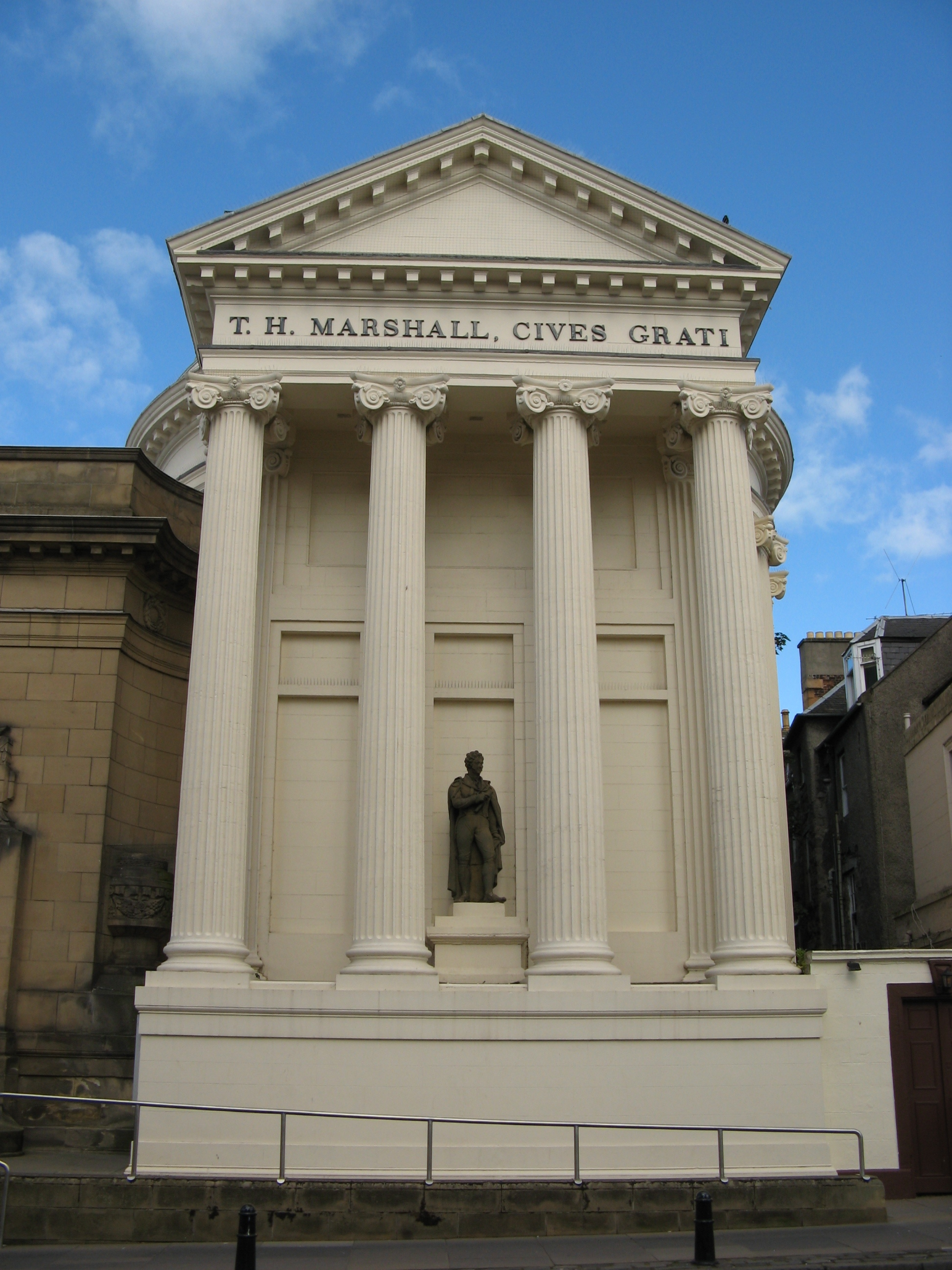
The Marshall Monument, beside Perth Museum and Art Gallery, pictured in 2008. Cives grati means grateful citizens

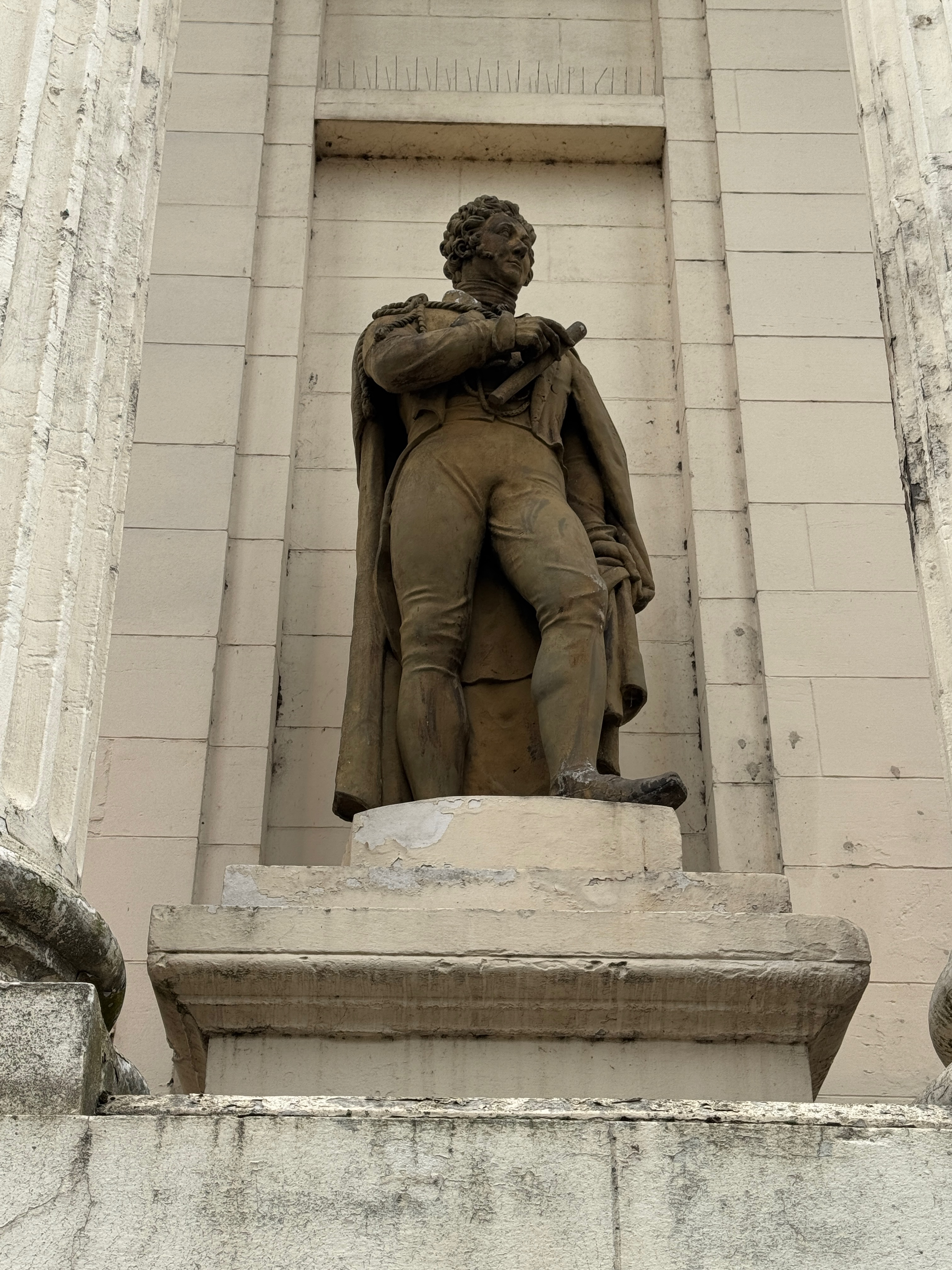
A close-up of the statue

Marshall was elected for two terms as Perth's lord provost, serving from 1800 to 1802 and from 1804 to 1806. He was the first to begin serving two-year terms, it previously having been a role that was elected annually.

== Military ==
In 1797, Marshall was initially a captain in the 90th Regiment of Foot, First Battalion, but was promoted to major of the Second Battalion, then lieutenant colonel. In 1798, as a member of the Duke of Wellington's Regiment, he was stationed at Portsmouth Barracks. He served alongside Thomas Black, who was shortly to become lord provost of Perth, and who died in office in the summer of 1798.

== Author namesake ==
Marshall is not to be confused with the hairdresser and local historian of the same name who wrote The History of Perth: From the Earliest Period to the Present Time, with information added by Henry Adamson. That gentleman lived between 1807 and 1882. His extensive history of the Royal Burgh was published by John Fisher in 1849.

== Personal life ==
Marshall married Rosie Anderson on 6 February 1792. The daughter of Thomas Anderson, owner of the Blackfriars land on which Perth is partly built, the Georgian street Rose Terrace, which overlooks Perth's North Inch, is named for her. The couple lived at the corner of Rose Terrace and Atholl Street. Their marriage was brief, Rose having had an affair with Thomas Bruce, 7th Earl of Elgin, and a Dr Harrison. Marshall first "raised letters of inhibition" against his wife on 2 June 1796. They divorced in November 1803, although it took two attempts due to Marshall's providing insufficient evidence of said adultery. Even while he was building his case, the defendant was sleeping with several officers, one of whom testified in court that he had "enjoyment of her person".

The proceedings gave way to several Scots ballads, including "Rosey Anderson":

There was an Assembly into Perth, and Rosey she was there,

Lord Elgin danced with her that night, and did her heart ensnare, Lord Elgin danced with her that night, she walked home on his arm,

Hay Marshall he came rushing in, in very great alarm.

In 1805, Marshall purchased several properties in Glenalmond from John Murray, 4th Duke of Atholl, for £10,000.

== Death ==
Marshall died on 15 July 1808, aged 38. He lived alone at Whistlecroft on the eastern side of the River Tay. He was also in debt, according to several sources. His remains were brought from his home, by his relatives and the Duke of Atholl, to the graveyard of the Church of the Friars Preachers of Blessed Virgin and Saint Dominic at Perth, known locally as Blackfriars.

=== Legacy ===
Perth historian Thomas Hay Marshall (1808–1882) was named in Marshall's honour. It is also believed they were related.
