= Maida (dog) =

Dog owned by Sir Walter Scott

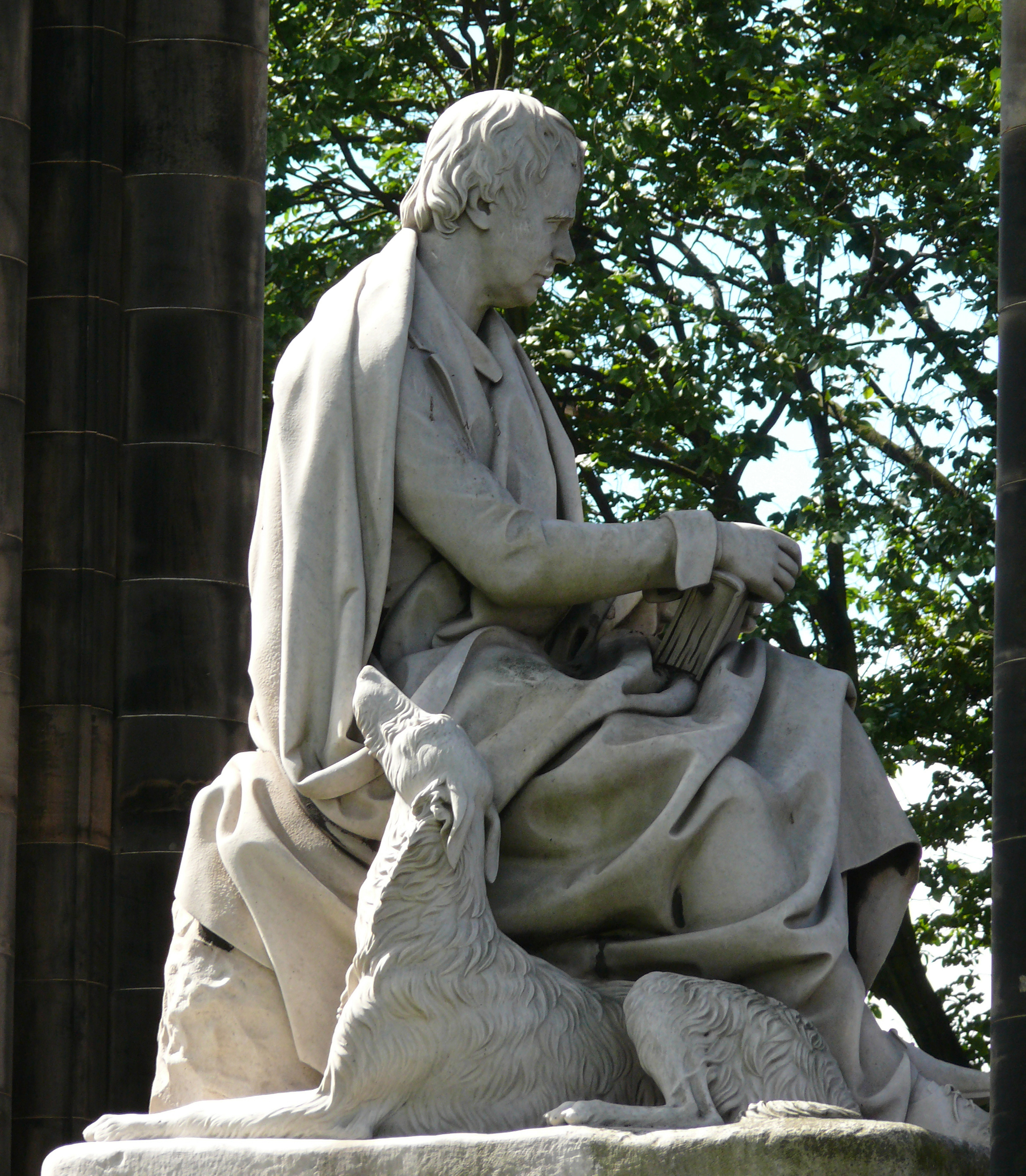
- Maida depicted on the Sir Walter Scott statue designed by John Steell, located inside the Scott Monument
- Breed: Pyrenean Wolfdog and a Highland Deerhound crossbreed
- Sex: male
- Born: 1813
- Died: 1824 (aged 10–11)
- Owner: Sir Walter Scott
- Named after: Battle of Maida

Maida (1813–1824) was one of the many dogs belonging to Sir Walter Scott. Sometimes called a Deerhound, Maida was a crossbreed from a Pyrenean Wolfdog and a Highland Deerhound, and was reported to be his favourite dog. The animal was named after the Battle of Maida, which took place in 1806, and was a gift from Alexander Macdonell of Glengarry (Alexander Ranaldson Macdonell), a friend of Scott, and whose brother led the 78th Highlanders in the battle, a victory for the British against the French in the Napoleonic Wars.

Scott wrote to his son Charles that "Old Maida died suddenly in his straw last week, after a good supper, which, considering his weak state, was rather a deliverance; he is buried below his monument, on which the following epitaph is engraved in Latin [Maidae marmorea dormis sub imagine Maida / Ante fores domini sit tibi terra levis], thus Englished by an eminent hand : -

'Beneath the sculptured form which late you bore,
Sleep soundly Maida at your master's door.'"

The monument mentioned is a statue of the dog at the hall door of Scott's home, Abbotsford House.

A statue of Scott at the Scott Monument in Edinburgh includes Maida gazing up at the seated figure. William Allan painted "Sir Walter Scott with His Dog 'Maida'" in 1831. Alexander Nasmyth painted the dog alone.

The part of Scott's statue in Perth featuring Maida was stolen, for a second time, in 2020.

== Gallery ==
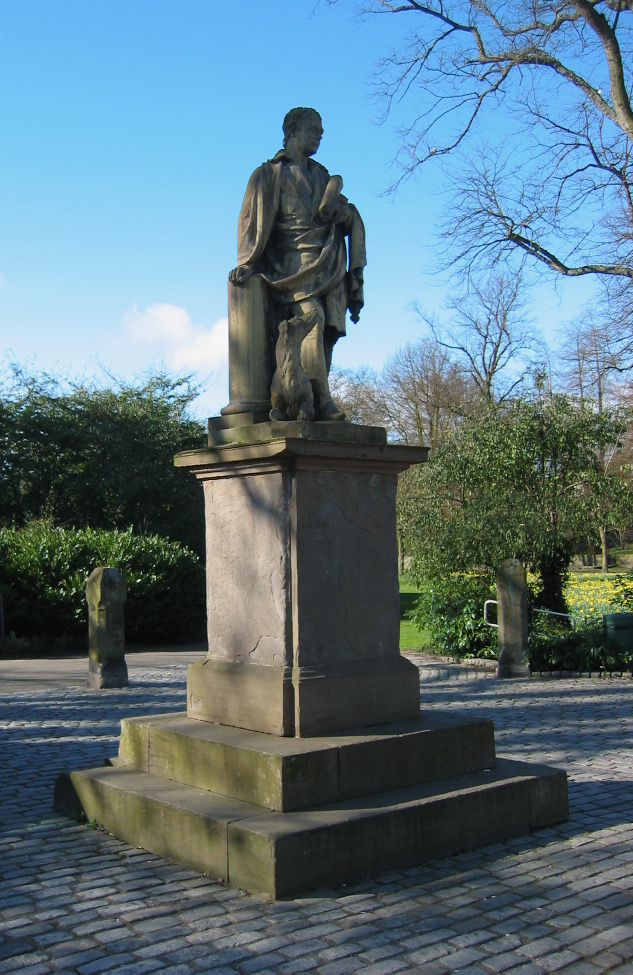
Statue of Scott and Maida at the South Inch, Perth, Scotland, dating to 1845

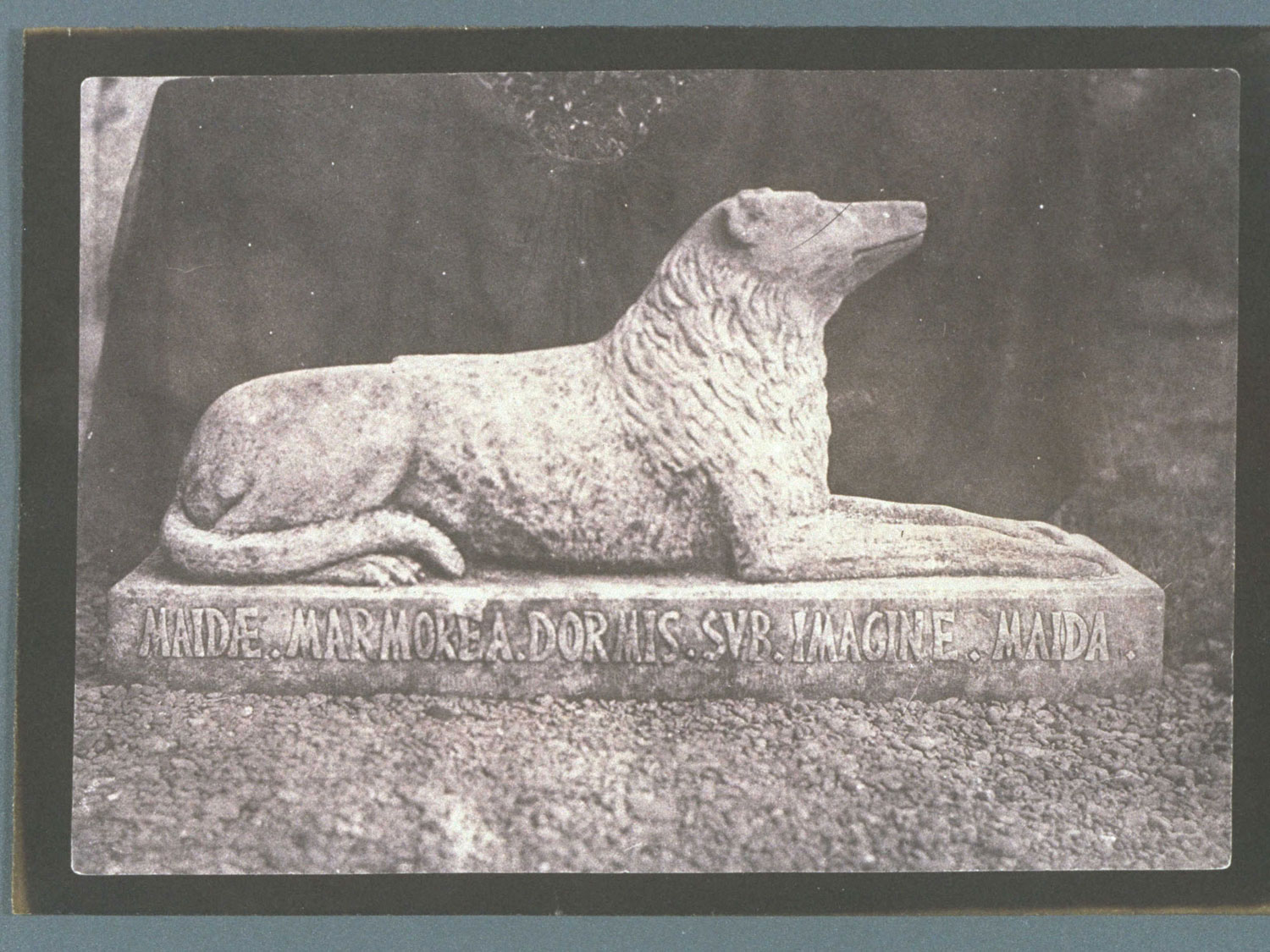
Sculpture of Maida
