= John Cochrane and Brothers =

John Cochrane and Brothers was a family of Scottish sculptors known for works in both the United Kingdom and Canada. They were David, James and John Cochrane, the sons of James and Elizabeth (née Paton) Cochrane. Although not the eldest, John seemingly took a leading role in establishing the business.

The children and their mother left Scotland for Toronto in May 1845. The sculpting business was continued, and John's advertisement in the 31 August 1847 edition of British Colonist announced his field as "sculpture in marble and stone" and listed as his specialities "Statues, Coats of Arms, Monuments, Tomb Stones, Sun Dials, Fonts, Vases, Chimney Pieces, Modelling, Ornaments &c." He formed an association with Anglo-Canadian architect William Thomas (c. 1799–1860), who used the Cochranes on all his important commissions between 1845 and 1850.

Elizabeth Cochrane died in 1846, the year after the family's arrival in Canada, at the age of 61.

== John Cochrane ==
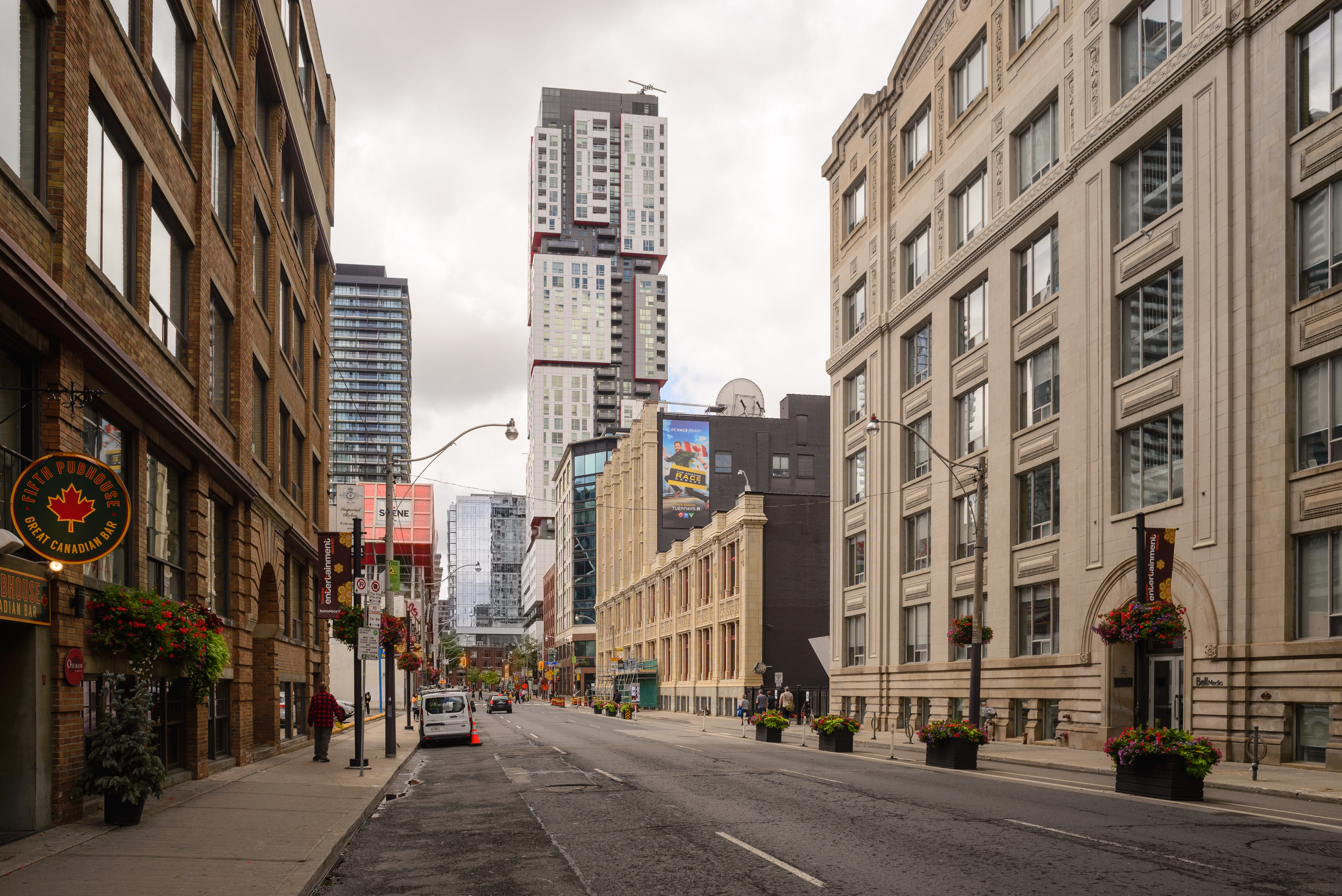
David Cochrane and Robert Pollock's partnership was based on today's Richmond Street West

John Cochrane was baptised on 31 March 1813, near Perth, Scotland.

In 1847, at the Toronto Society of Arts exhibition, Cochrane exhibited a Gothic head carved in stone, an angelic head by Thomas, and the plans for the interior of Toronto's St. Paul's Cathedral. The following year, he served on the management committee for the exhibition, which put on display his plaster statue of Joseph Brant.

Cochrane died in Toronto on 1 August 1850, at the age of 38. After his death, his brothers continued on the business, with stone-cutter Robert Pollock, as Cochranes and Pollock until 1852, when David Cochrane and Pollock formed a new partnership, based on Duke Street (now Richmond Street West), near Nelson Street.

== David Cochrane ==
David Cochrane died on 25 March 1859, aged 42. His wife, Margaret Menzies Cochrane, later married Robert Sargant. She died on 28 May 1894, aged 81. Margaret is buried beside her first husband at Toronto Necropolis Cemetery.

== James Cochrane ==
James Cochrane owned a marble factory on Queen Street East in Toronto as of 1851.

== Notable works ==
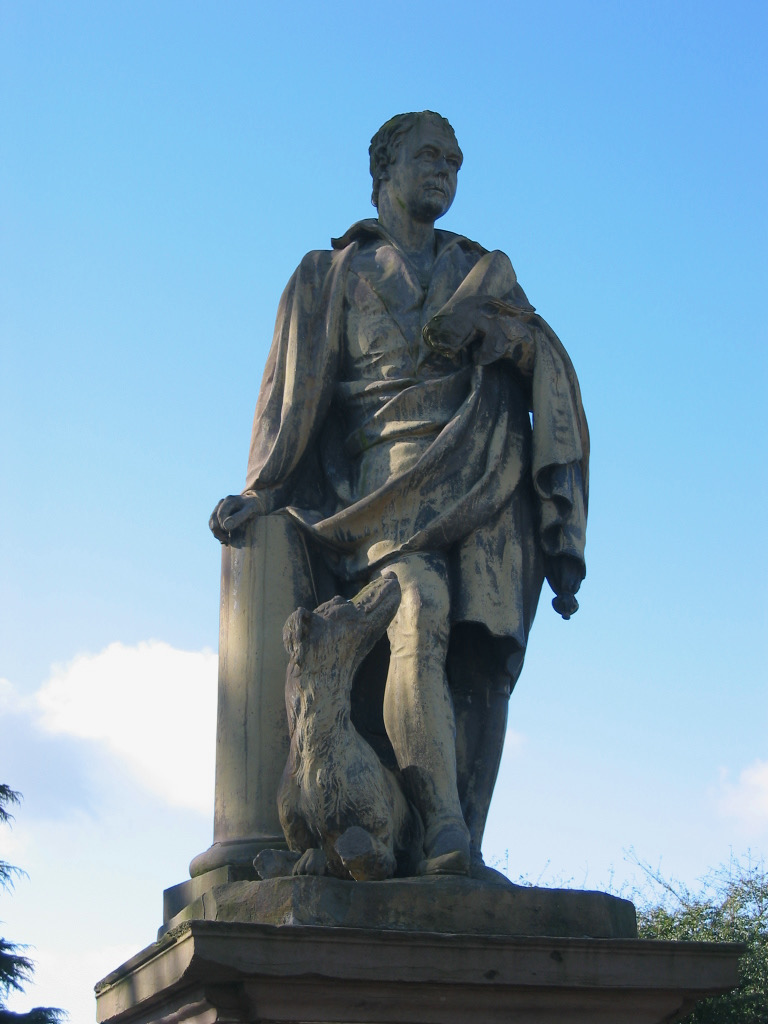
Statue of Sir Walter Scott, Perth, Scotland

- Statue of Sir Walter Scott, South Inch, Perth
- Statue of Thomas Hay Marshall at Perth Museum and Art Gallery, Perth
- Kinfauns Castle West Lodge gate piers (1826)
- Bank of British North America, Toronto (now demolished) (coat of arms stone carving)
- St. Paul's Cathedral, London, Ontario (interior decorations)
- St. Michael's Cathedral Basilica (stone and stucco ornamentation) and Bishop's Palace, Toronto (stone carving, including a coat of arms in the central gable)
- St. Lawrence Hall, Toronto (exterior embellishments)

== Images ==
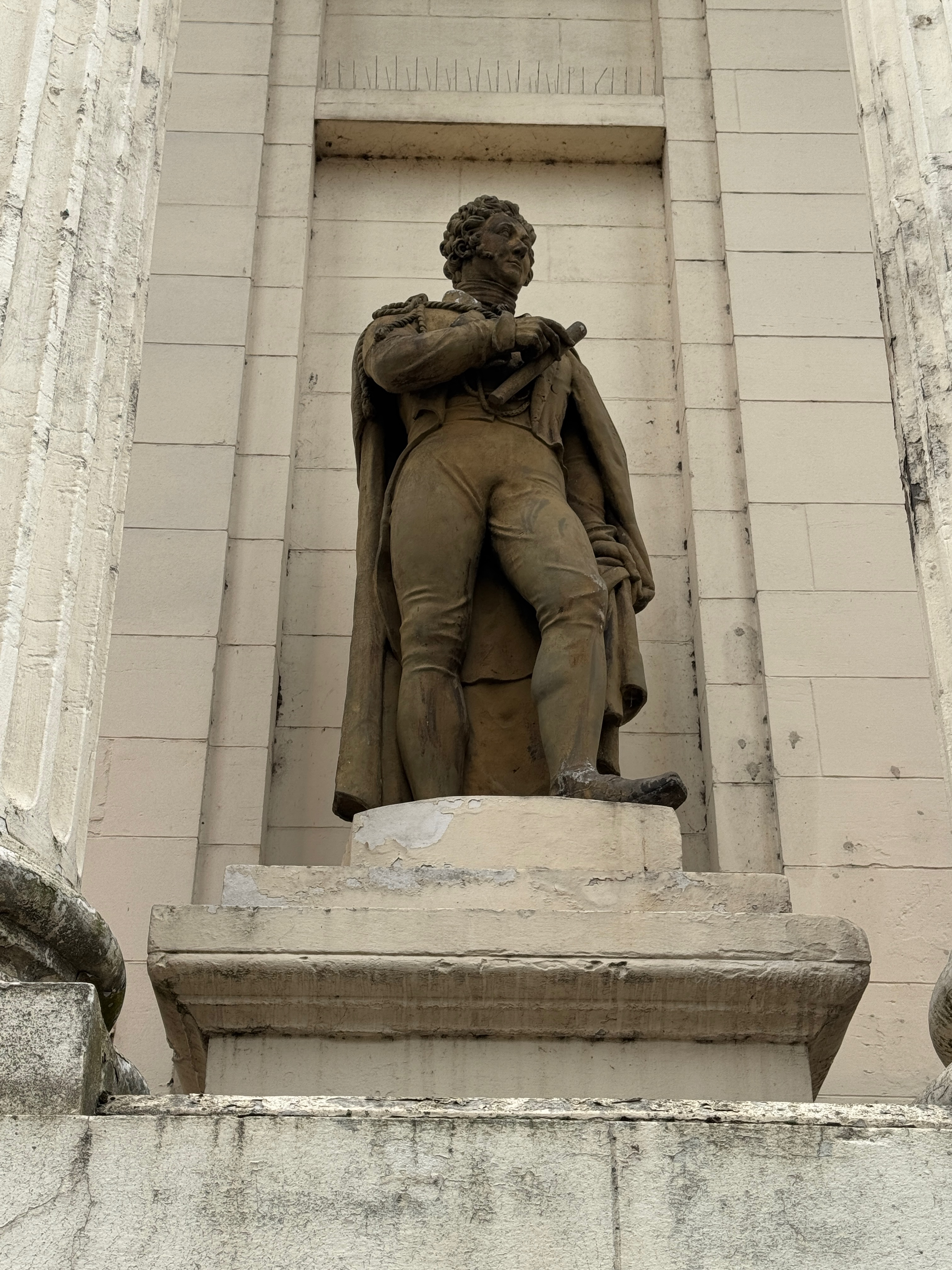
Statue of Thomas Hay Marshall

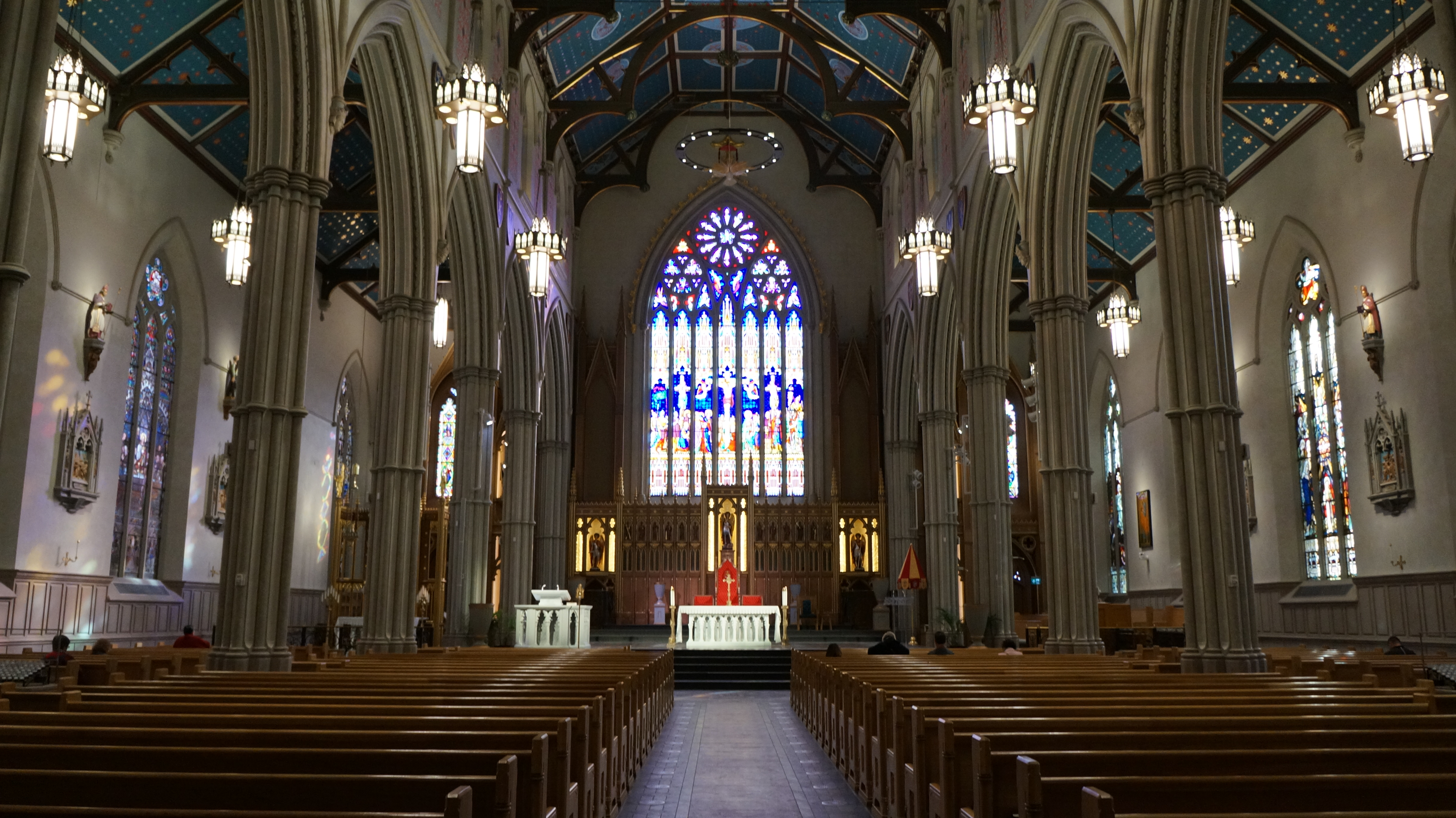
Interior of St. Michael's Cathedral Basilica

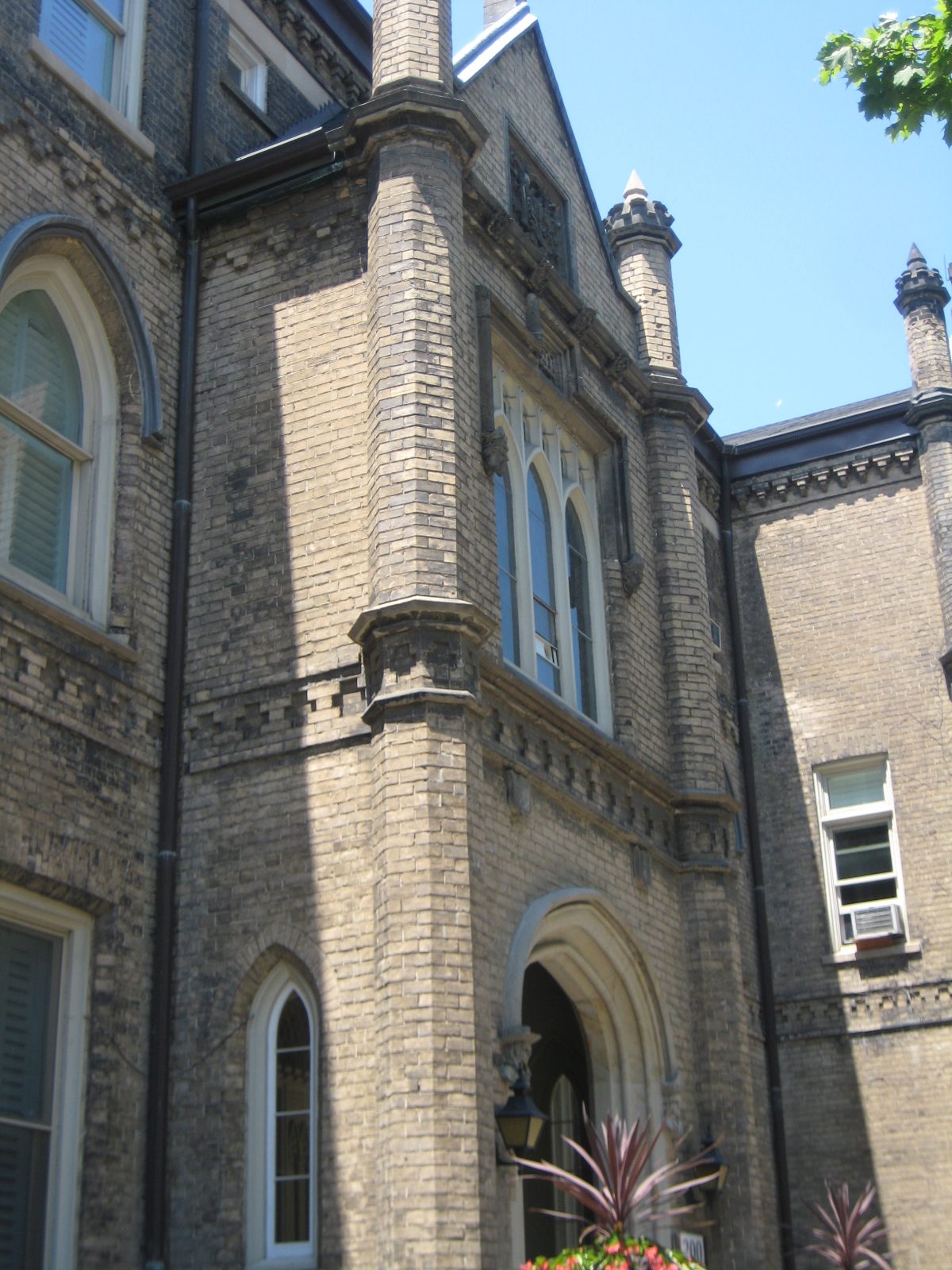
The Cochranes were responsible for this coat-of-arms carving on the Bishop's Palace at St. Michael's Cathedral Basilica in Toronto

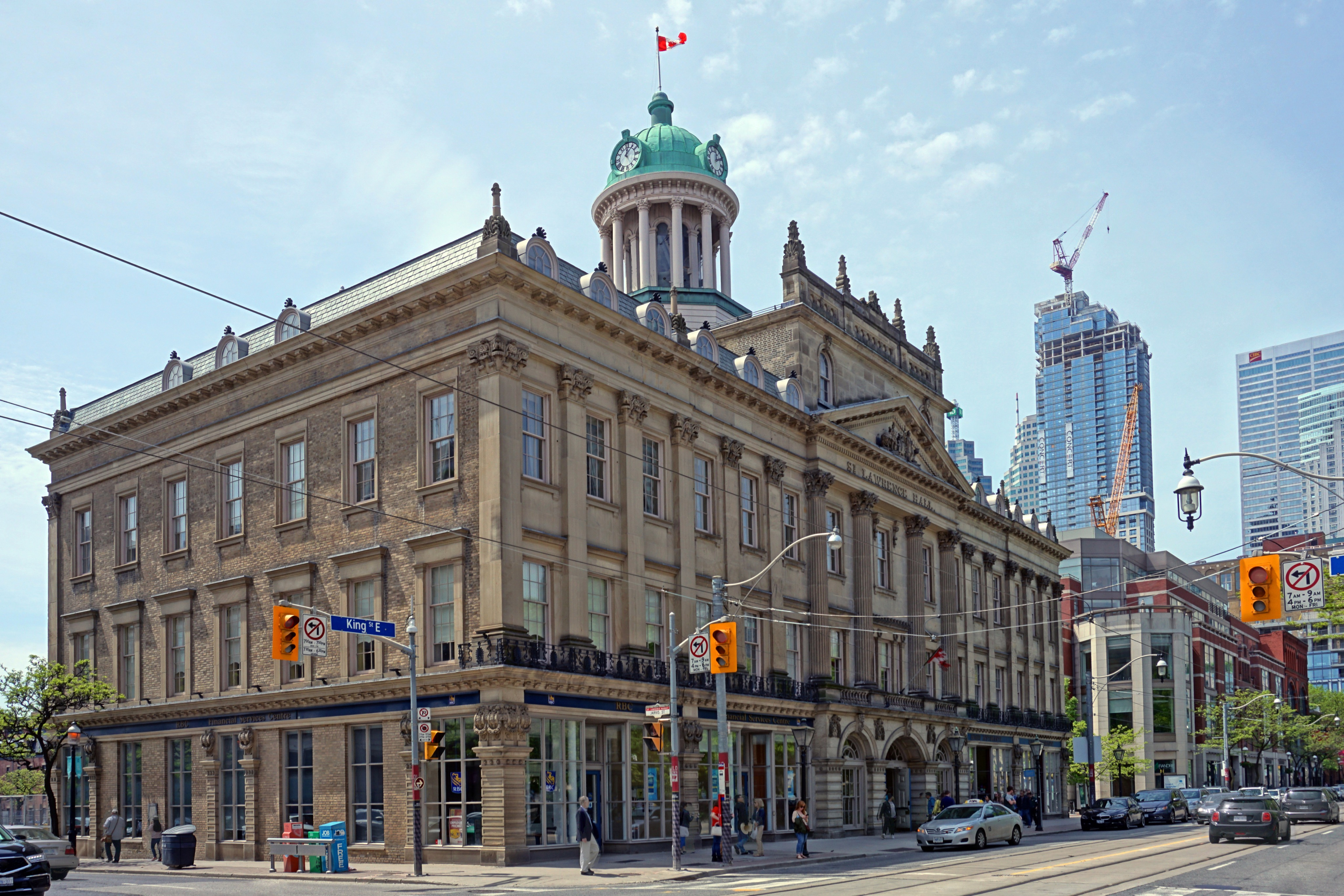
St. Lawrence Hall

== Sources ==
- MTRL, Toronto, Mechanics' Institute papers, D25. Toronto Soc. of Arts, Toronto Society of Arts: first exhibition, 1847
- Toronto Society of Arts: second exhibition, 1848
- British Canadian, and Canada West Commercial and General Advertiser (Toronto), 27 March 1847
- British Colonist, 19, 26 March, 31 Aug., 3 Sept. 1847; 28 April 1848; 2 Aug. 1850
- Toronto Globe, 1 Aug. 1850.
- Arthur, Eric, No Mean City (Toronto, 1964) ISBN 9781487516710
- C. D. Lowrey, "The Toronto Society of Arts, 1847–48: patriotism and the pursuit of culture in Canada West," RACAR (Quebec and Toronto), 12 (1985): 3–44.
