= Old Academy, Perth =

Architectural structure in Perth and Kinross, Scotland

Old Academy
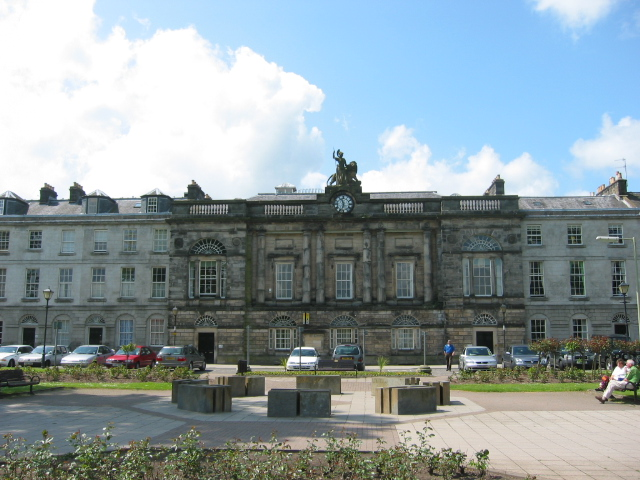
- The building in 2003, exactly 200 years since construction on it began

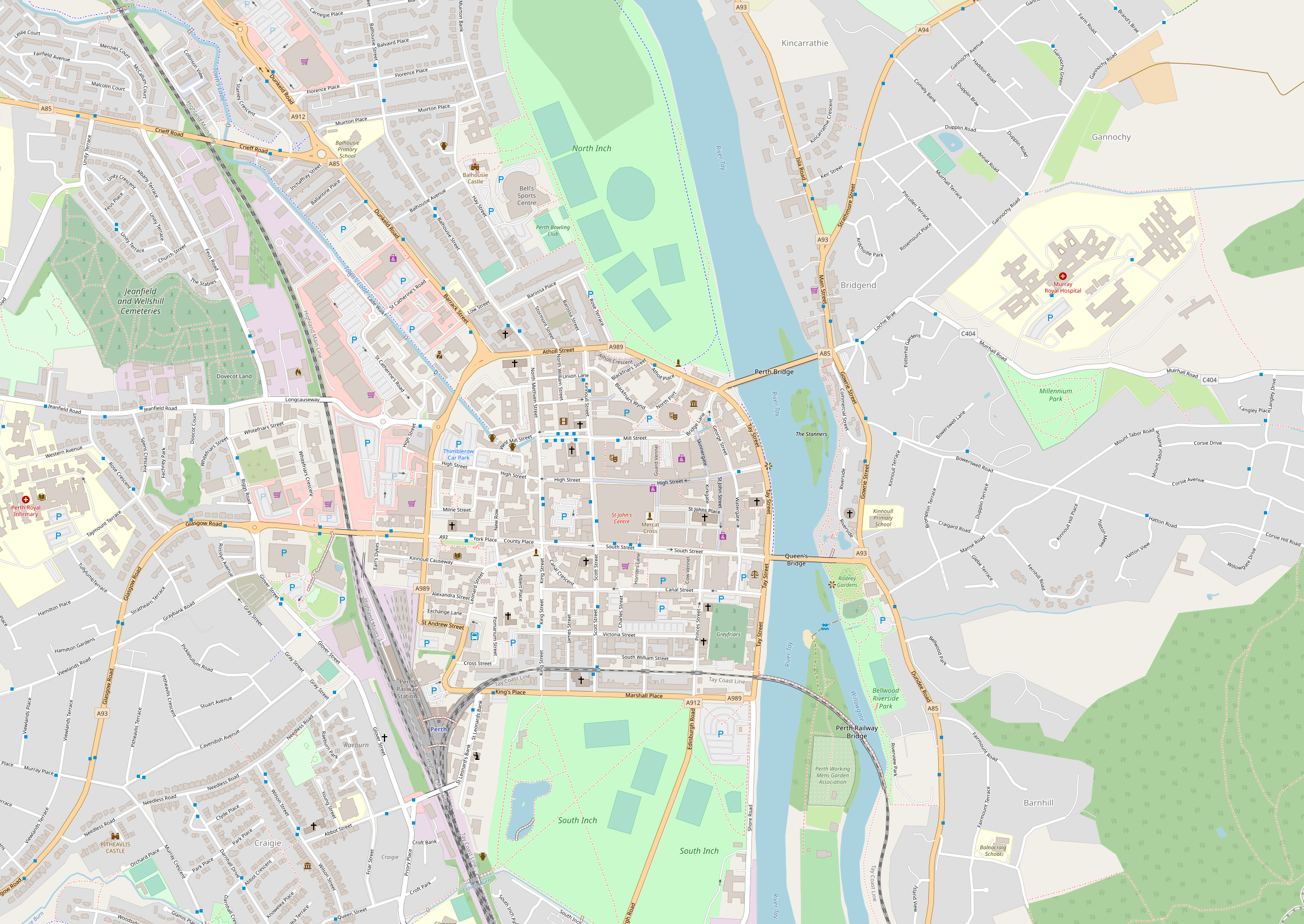
- Shown in Perth
- 56.40019°N 3.43252°W
- Location: 6–7 Rose Terrace, Perth, Scotland

History
- Built: 1807 (219 years ago)

Site notes
- Architect: Robert Reid
- Architectural style: Georgian

Listed Building – Category A
- Designated: 20 May 1965
- Reference no.: LB39322

The Old Academy is an historic building in Perth, Scotland. Located on Rose Terrace, overlooking the southern end of the North Inch, it is a Category A listed building, built between 1803 and 1807. It was the home of Perth Academy between 1807 and 1932.

Thomas Hay Marshall, twice Perth lord provost, was involved with its design with Robert Reid, four years before Marshall's death.

The building formerly housed Perth Academy, established in 1696 (at the time specialising mostly in Maths and the sciences), the Grammar (specialising in mostly Classics, History and Philosophy), the English School, the French school, the Drawing and Painting school, and the Writing school. Together they were known as the public Seminaries.

The building's balustraded parapet, with a clock and statues of Britannia and a British Lion, was added in 1886, the work of sculptor William Birnie Rhind. His father, John Rhind, died in Perth three years later.

Andrew Granger Heiton made additions in 1907, and Donald Alexander Stewart made alterations to the academy's preparatory department in 1908.

Perth Academy moved to its current location, in the Viewlands area of the city, in 1932.

== See also ==
- List of Category A listed buildings in Perth and Kinross
- List of listed buildings in Perth, Scotland

== Gallery ==
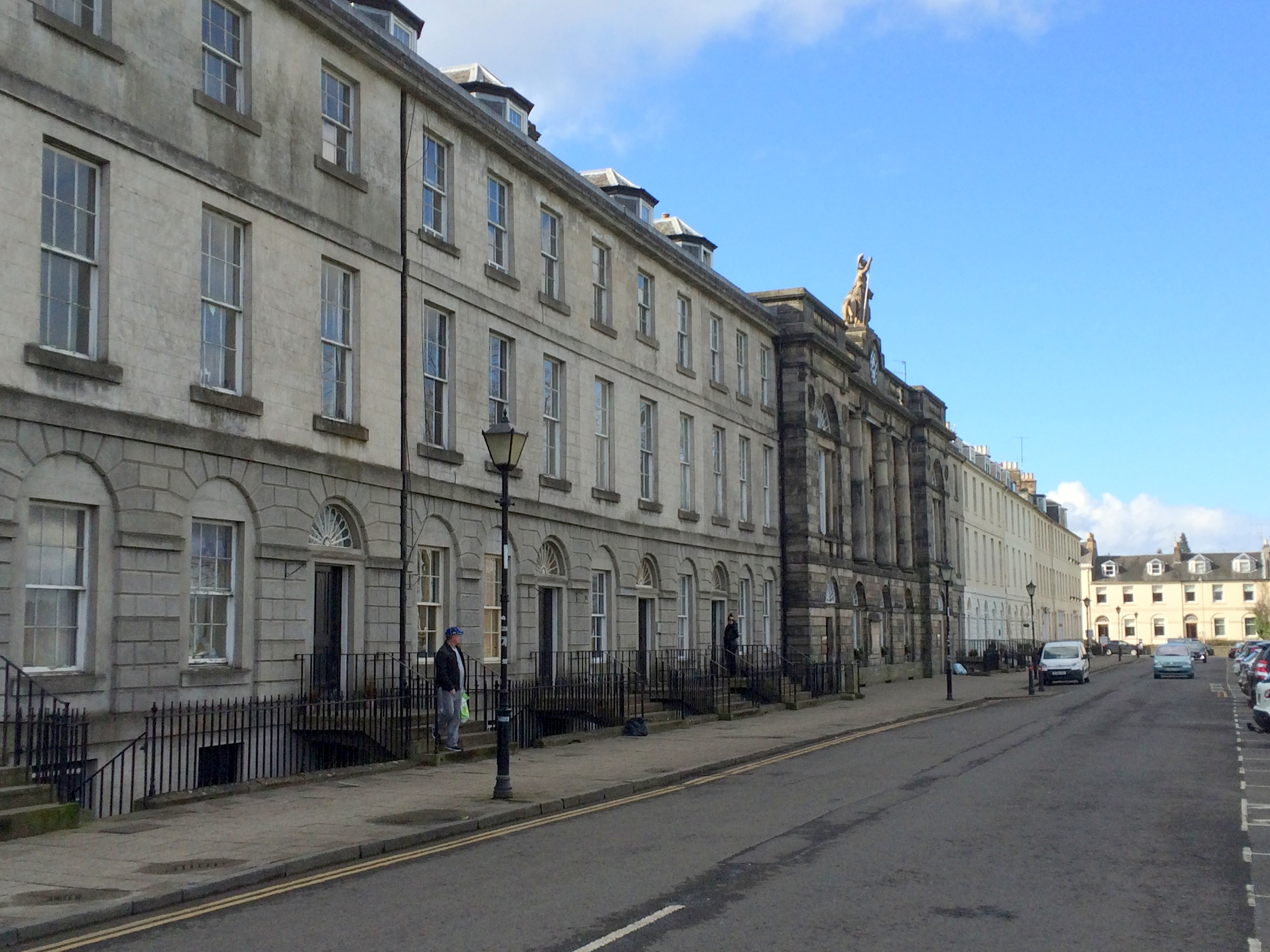
The Academy in context with the rest of Rose Terrace

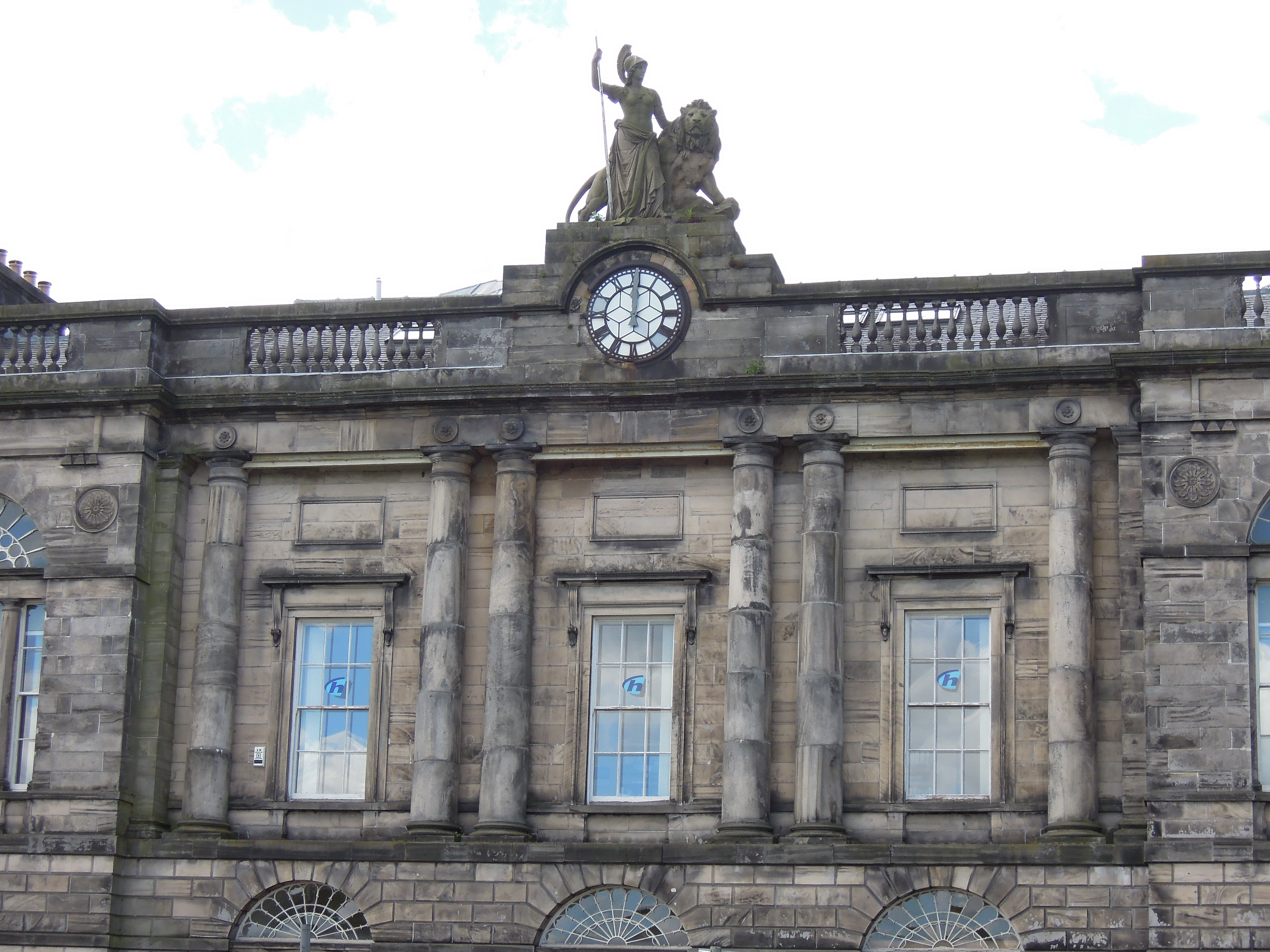
The top half of the building. Britannia's trident was replaced as new around 2020

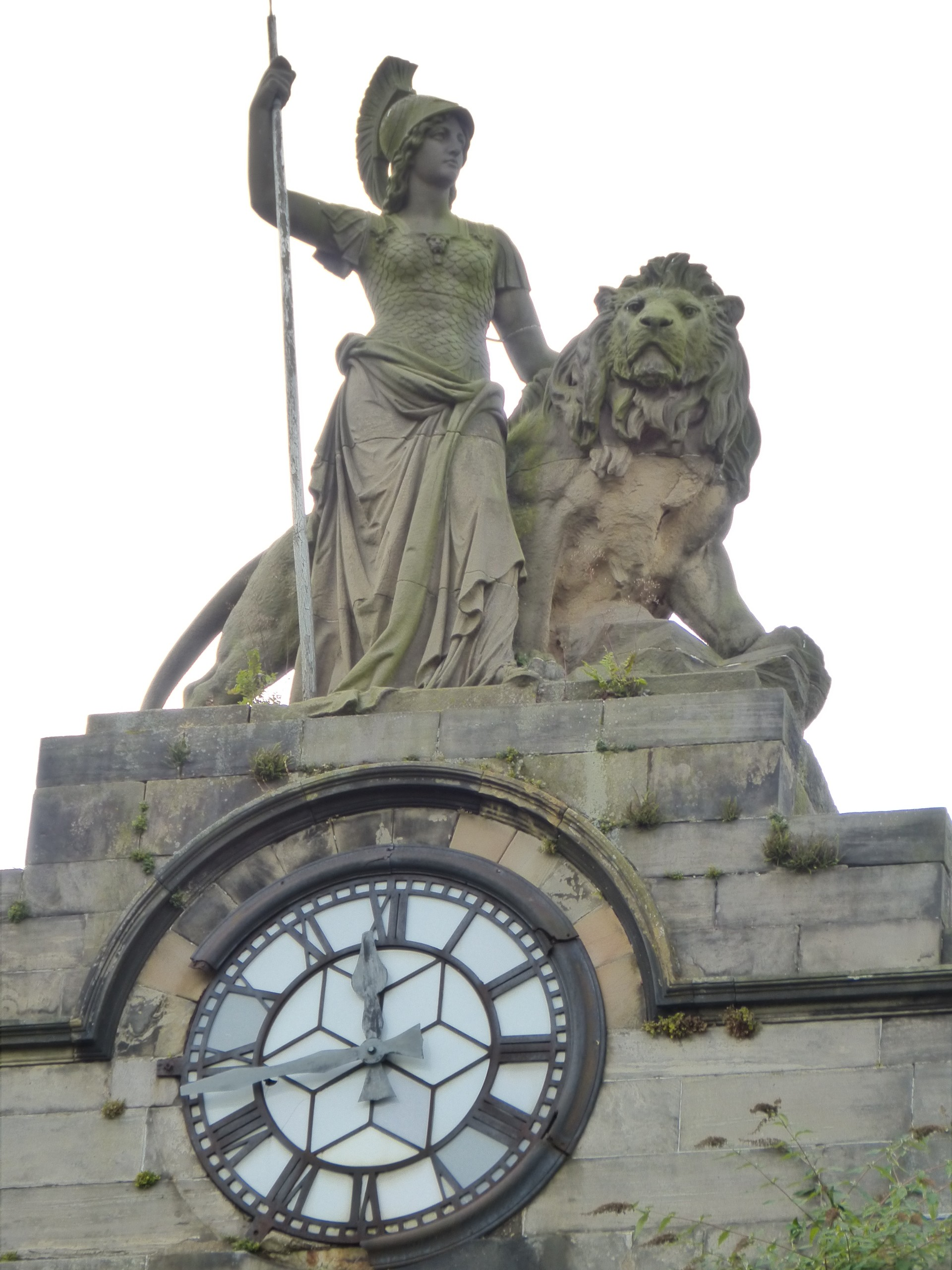
Clock, statue of Britannia and British Lion, added in 1886
