= Statue of Sir Walter Scott, Perth =

Statue of Scottish author

Statue of Sir Walter Scott
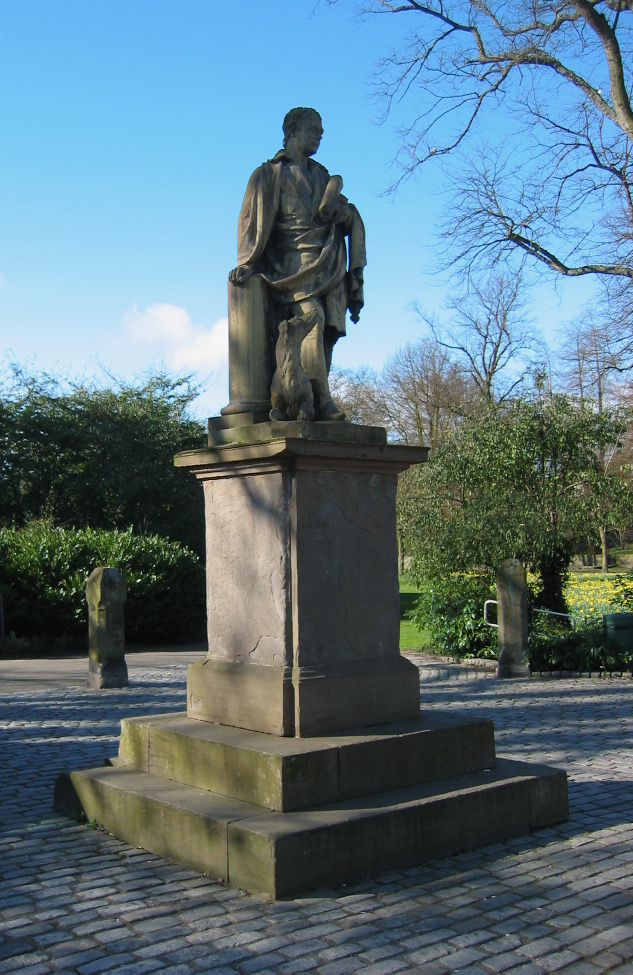
- The statue in 2006
- Interactive map of Statue of Sir Walter Scott
- Location: South Inch; Perth, Perth and Kinross; Scotland
- Coordinates: 56.3919878°N 3.434406°W
- Type: Statue
- Material: Stone
- Opening date: 1845 (181 years ago)
- Dedicated to: Sir Walter Scott

The Statue of Sir Walter Scott is a Category C listed monument at the South Inch public park in Perth, Perth and Kinross, Scotland. Standing where Marshall Place and King's Place merge, at King Street, it is dedicated to Sir Walter Scott, author of The Fair Maid of Perth in 1828. The statue is the work of John Cochrane and Brothers, and was completed in 1845 as one of their final works before leaving for Canada. It was accidentally acquired by the city magistrates at the sale of a local sculptor's stock. The statue originally stood at the eastern end of Perth's High Street, but was removed to its current location in 1877.

It stands upon a corniced square-plan stone plinth raised on two plinths and surmounted by a stone statue depicting the subject. The figure is standing, facing north to King Street, swathed in a toga, with his right hand resting on broken column and his Scottish Deerhound, Maida, lying at his feet. An inscription reads SIR WALTER SCOTT BT 1771–1832.

The part of the statue of Scott's dog was stolen in 2020. It was also stolen in 2016.

An iron railing originally surrounded the statue and at least part of the South Inch's boundary. As with the majority of the city's iron railings, they were removed to be made into artillery for the wars.

== Gallery ==
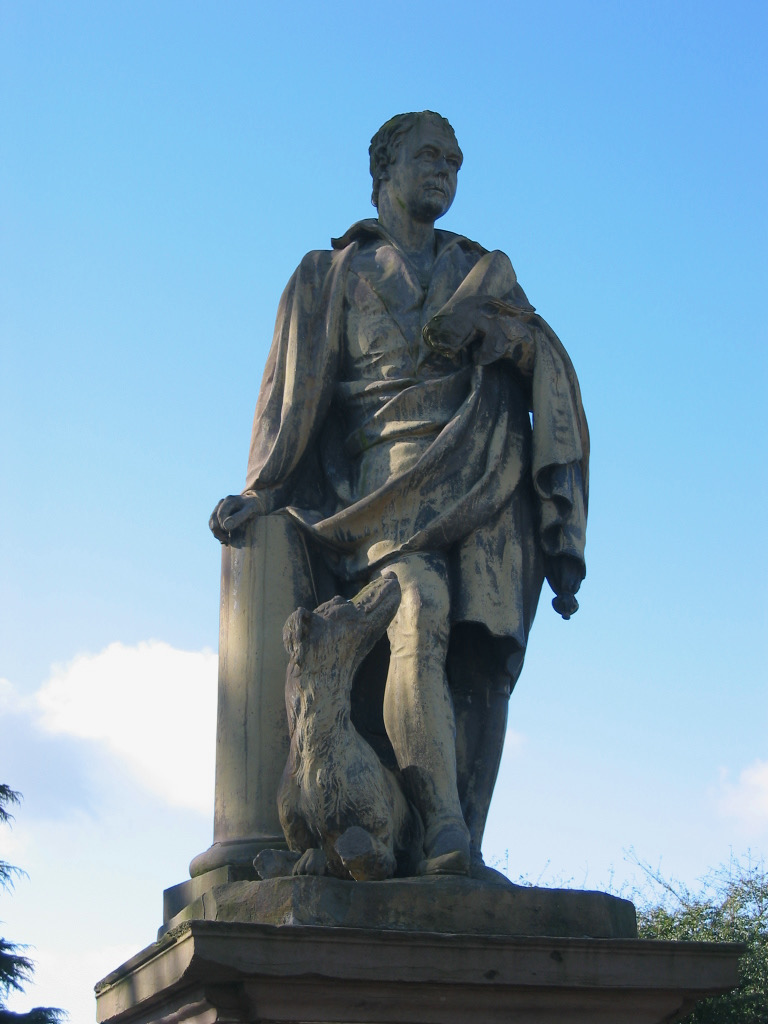
Detail

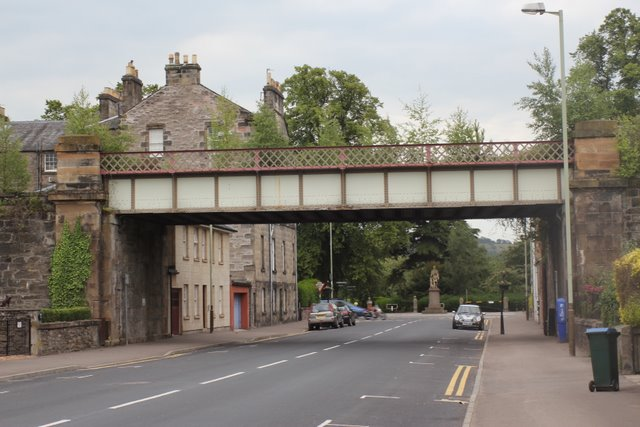
Viewed from King Street, looking south

A late-19th-century view

== See also ==
- List of listed buildings in Perth, Scotland
