= Bowerswell =

House in Perth and Kinross, Scotland

Coordinates: 56.3976°N 3.4182°W

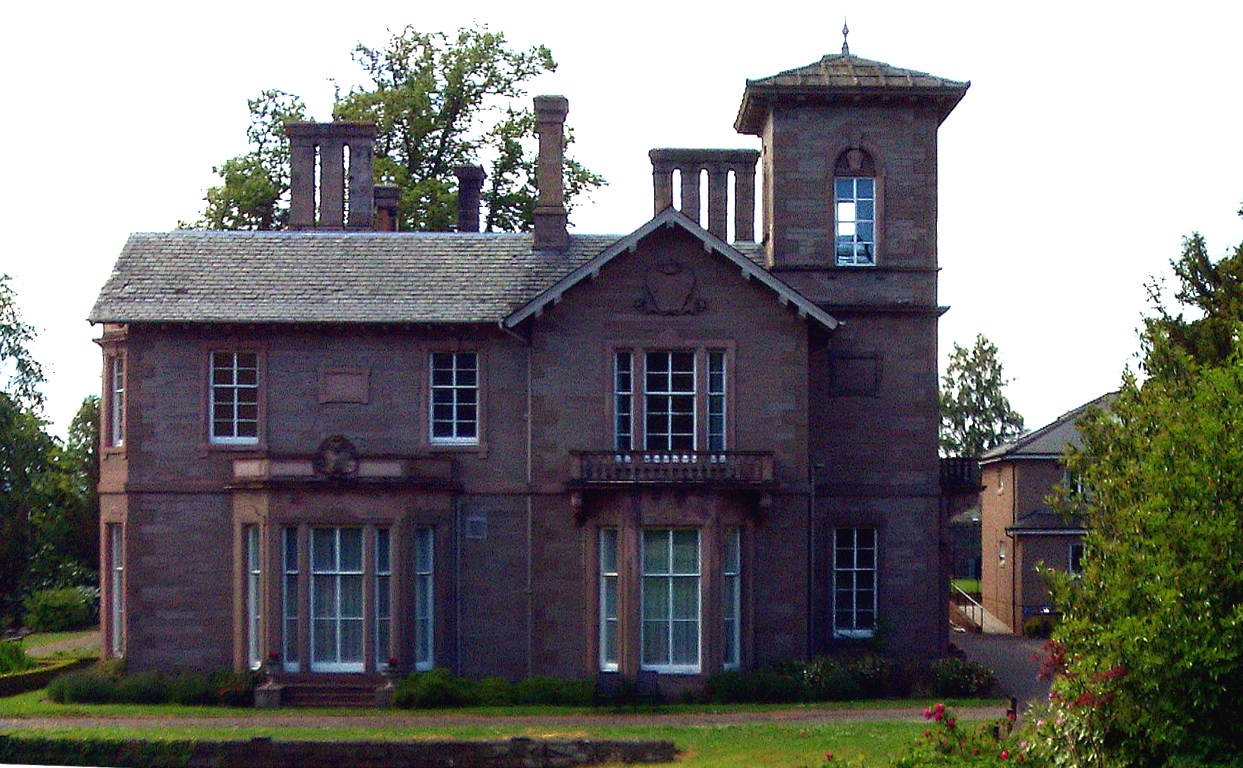
Bowerswell in 2016

Bowerswell (formerly known as Whistlecroft) is an early-19th-century house on Bowerswell Road, Kinnoull, Scotland. It is a Grade B listed building and was the childhood home of Effie Gray; she and John Ruskin were married there in 1848.

After World War II, the house and surrounding grounds were purchased by Perth Council as a "living" war memorial; the house and 20 cottages in the grounds serve as sheltered housing. The City of Perth Book of Remembrance for WW2 is housed in the building.

== Description ==
The house was described in the Perth Courier of 24 August 1809 as "lately built", likely by Perth lord provost Thomas Hay Marshall (who died at the property in July 1808), and had a succession of owners before being sold to George Gray, a lawyer, and future father of Effie Gray, in 1827. It was rented to John Thomas Ruskin (grandfather of the writer John Ruskin) in 1809, but the Ruskin family never owned it. It is described at the time of Effie's childhood as "a Regency villa overlooking the city of Perth" (the Regency era officially spanned the years 1811 to 1820, though the term is commonly applied to the longer period of 1795–1837).

The Buildings of Scotland volume describes it as "a large house of 1848" and the Historic Environment Scotland listing also gives its date as 1848, but these dates would appear to refer to a remodelling. It "was only about forty years old in 1842–44 when George Gray undertook an extensive rebuilding in that neo-renaissance style which John [Ruskin] was to assail so comprehensively in his books".
