= George Dunbar, 10th Earl of March =

Scottish nobleman

Arms of George de Dunbar, 10th Earl of Dunbar and March Gules a lion rampant Argent on a bordure of the same eight roses of the field

George de Dunbar, 10th Earl of Dunbar and March (1338–1403), 12th Lord of Annandale and Lord of the Isle of Man, was "one of the most powerful nobles in Scotland of his time, and the rival of the Douglases."

== Family ==
Pitscottie states that this George is a son of John de Dunbar of Derchester & Birkynside, by his spouse Geiles (or Isabella), daughter of Thomas Randolph, 1st Earl of Moray (d. 1332). John was son of Alexander de Dunbar, Knt. (a younger son of Patrick de Dunbar, 7th Earl of March), although some genealogies place John as a son of Patrick de Dunbar, 8th Earl of March. If John's father Alexander was a younger brother of Patrick de Dunbar, "8th" Earl of March, then John is not a younger brother of Sir Patrick de Dunbar, 9th Earl of March.

Scots Peerage identifies George as the son of Sir Patrick de Dunbar and Isabella Randolph, the nephew of Patrick, 9th Earl of Dunbar through his marriage to Agnes Randolph. Sir Patrick was the 9th Earl's cousin, his father being Sir Alexander de Dunbar, son of the 7th Earl and younger brother of the 8th Earl. Through these relationships George was both the nephew and cousin of the 9th Earl, and he has been described as both is historical records.

George's mother Isabella and her sister Agnes Randolph (wife of the 9th Earl of Dunbar) were heiresses jointly of their brother, John Randolph, 3rd Earl of Moray. Each received half of the Randolph properties. On 28 June 1363 King David II confirmed a grant in which Patrick, Earl of Dunbar and his wife Agnes resigned half of the baronies of Tibbers and Morton in favor of George de Dunbar (he was not yet the 10th Earl), in this document George is described as their cousin. George received the other half of these same estates from his own mother Isabella through normal inheritance. George appears as second witness, styled 'cousin' of Sir Patrick (rather than 'nephew') and his wife 'black' Agnes Randolph, in another charter signed at Dunbar Castle on 24 May 1367. George is said to have succeeded his uncle Sir Patrick to become 10th Earl of Dunbar and this is true, yet it is not. Patrick, 9th Earl of Dunbar resigned the Earldom of Dunbar/March to the crown on 25 July 1368 and the crown re-granted the earldom to his 'cousin' George de Dunbar. Although George was the nephew of Sir Patrick by marriage, it was through his relationship as cousin that he received the earldom, that is why the point is so often made that he was his cousin, when the more logical and closer relationship was nephew. He inherited through his blood relationship as cousin, not through his marriage relationship of nephew. "Robetus de Lawedre, consanguineus noster" (a cousin) witnessed a charter of "Georgii comitis Marchie" relating to Sorrowlessfield, a still extant property on the (A68) road south of Earlston, Berwickshire, in the reign (1390–1406) of Robert III, indicating both his extended family and that he was active in the management of the Dunbar family estates during Robert's reign.

He married Christina, daughter of Alan de Wyntoun and had at least eight children, including:

- Sir George, 11th Earl of Dunbar & March
- Dame Elizabeth de Dunbar, betrothed to David Stewart, Duke of Rothesay, marriage annulled 1397
- Sir Gavin de Dunbar of Cumnock, Ayrshire.
- Columba de Dunbar, Bishop of Moray
- Patrick de Dunbar of Biel, Haddingtonshire, living 1452.
- John de Dunbar, believed to have died young
- Sir David de Dunbar of Cockburn, whose daughter, Marjorie/Margaret de Dunbar, married Alexander Lindsay, 4th Earl of Crawford
- Janet, who married as her first husband, Sir John Seton of Seton, Knt.,(died 1441) She married secondly, Adam Johnstone of that Ilk (in Annandale).

George de Dunbar, 10th Earl of March, also had one known 'natural' son, Nicholas. Nicholas was imprisoned in the Tower in 1421, along with his half-brother David de Dunbar. The name of Nicholas' mother is not known. Nicholas de Dunbar, Esquire, petitioned the Pope in 1394 for a dispensation that he might be ordained.

== Campaigns and intrigue ==
The Earl of March acquired the estates centred on the castles of Morton and Tibbers, with Morton likely becoming the centre of administration for both.

The Earl of March accompanied James Douglas, 2nd Earl of Douglas, in his incursion into England, and after the Battle of Otterburn (1388) he took command of the Scots, whom he conducted safely home.

== Broken betrothal and rift with Scotland ==
In 1395, the Earl's oldest daughter Elizabeth Dunbar was betrothed by contract to David Stewart, Duke of Rothesay, son of King Robert III and heir to the throne. A Papal mandate allowing the marriage was issued 10 August 1395, but the impatient couple were married before the Papal mandate arrived. The Church was not pleased and on 10 March 1397, the Pope issued a dispensation granting that they should be allowed to 'remarry' after a period of separation. Archibald Douglas, 3rd Earl of Douglas, 'The Grim', protested against the match, and through the influence of the Duke of Albany had the contract annulled. Instead of 'remarrying' Elizabeth de Dunbar, his wife of almost 2 years, Prince David married Marjory Douglas, daughter of Earl Douglas.

== Exile to England ==
In consequence of these events, George renounced his properties in Scotland and his allegiance to Robert III and moved the entire family to England, joining the court of King Henry IV. On 28 June 1401, Henry granted, by Letters Patent, to "George de Dunbarre earl of the March of Scotland and Cristiana his wife" the lordship of Somerton in Lincolnshire, and the heirs male of their bodies, to be held by homage and military service. On the same day Henry gave "George de Dunbarre earl of the March of Scotland" £100 sterling per annum "of his special favour" and in October granted him 'costs' of £25/9s/7d; and granted his wife "Cristiana countess of Dunbarre" £40/19s/3d "for her charges and expenses coming from the North at his command, to prosecute certain matters touching her husband, herself, and their heirs".

=== Battles ===
Dunbar accompanied Henry IV on his lacklustre invasion of Scotland in 1400. The following year he made a wasteful inroad into Scotland, and in June 1402, he was victorious against a small Scottish force at the Battle of Nesbit Moor. At the subsequent Battle of Homildon Hill he again fought on the English side.

In the summer of 1403 the Percies declared open revolt against King Henry IV and raised their standard of revolt at Chester. A plan was hatched to seize the King's son, the young Prince of Wales, at Shrewsbury. The plan was foiled by the extreme speed with which Henry IV moved once he heard details of the revolt. "Egged on by his very competent and energetic ally, the renegade Scotsman, George Dunbar", he drove his men across the Midlands towards Shrewsbury, raising more troops as he went. The Battle of Shrewsbury took place on 21 July 1403, with Dunbar fighting on the side of Henry IV. It was a royal victory and the revolt was, for the moment, over.

=== Estates ===
Thereafter in the same year "George de Dunbar earl of the March of Scotland" petitioned (Parliamentary Petitions, No.961) Henry IV stating that he had lost all his castles, lordships, goods and chattels in Scotland on account of his being his liegeman, and asked the King to "ordain in this parliament that if any conquest is made in the realm of Scotland, the petitioner may have restoration of his castles, &c., and also his special protection for all dwelling in the earldom of March who come to his allegiance hereafter". This was endorsed by the King.

On 21 January 1403/4 "George de Dunbarre earl of the March of Scotland" received a £100 annuity from Henry IV.

Between 14 and 18 August 1403, King Henry granted George de Dunbar, Earl of March, the ward of the manors and lordships of Kyme and Croftes in Lincolnshire, and a house and chattels in Bishopsgate, City of London, for life, which had previously belonged to the late Thomas Percy, Earl of Worcester, and was forfeited by his rebellion.

Under a Letters Patent, "the King's cousin, George de Dunbarre, Earl of March of Scotland", for "his daily service and great costs" was given the manor of Clippeston in Shirewood by King Henry IV on 10 June 1405. In addition, on 14th of the following month, the King gave him the ward of the lands of the late Thomas Umfraville in Haysille on Humber in York, till the majority of Gilber his heir, or his heirs in succession if he dies in minority.

In addition he shared in the forfeited estates of the attainted Thomas Bardolf, 5th Lord Bardolf (who later fell with Percy at the Battle of Bramham Moor in February 1408). However, as the following decree shows, George did not retain them all: "27 April 1407. The King to the sheriff of Lincoln. Referring to the late plea in Chancery between Amicia wife of Thomas, late lord of Bardolf, and George de Dunbarre regarding certain lands in Ruskynton forfeited by Thomas, which had been granted by the King to George, with the manor of Calthorpe, the half of Ancaster (and many others), wherein it was adjudged that Rusynton should be excepted from the grant and restored to her with the rents, etc., from 27 November 1405, drawn by George, - the King orders him to restore the same to Amicia. Westminster. [Close, 9 Henry IV. m.17.]".

== Return to Scotland ==
Through the mediation of Sir Walter Haliburton of Dirleton, reconciliation with the Douglases was effected in 1408, and he was allowed to return to Scotland the following year, taking possession of his earldom of March, but said to be deprived of the lordship of Annandale.

In 1411 he was one of the Scottish Commissioners for negotiating a truce with England, but is said to have died of a contagious fever, in 1420, at the age of 82. Contrary to this, he appears as the grantor in a charter dated 8 September 1422. In it he is identified as the Earl of March, and one of the witnesses is described by the Earl as 'Christiana my spouse'. This indicates that George the 10th was still alive and still Earl as of September 1422, as his son George the 11th would have described Christiana and 'my mother'.
