= South Inch =

Park in Perth, Scotland

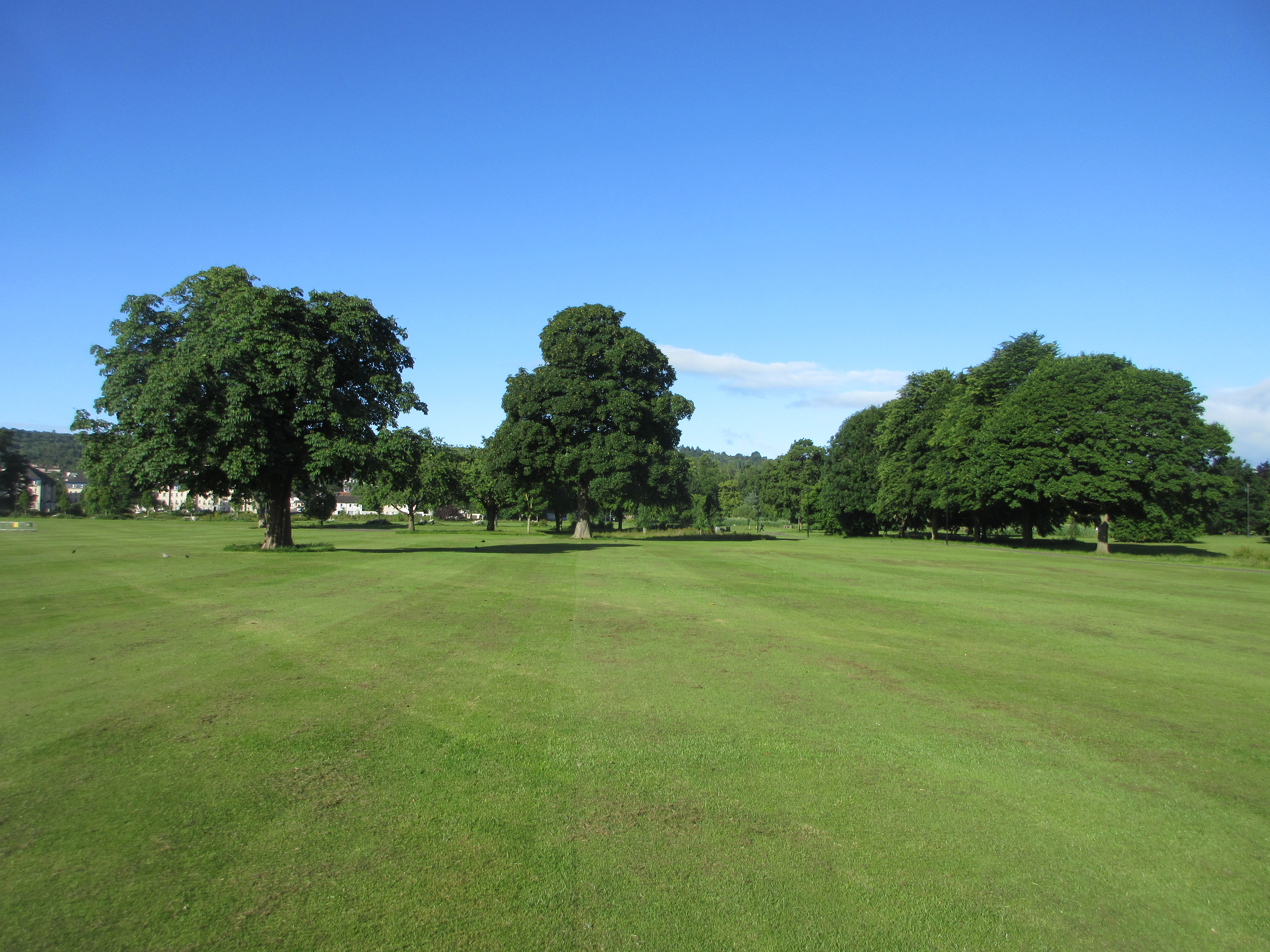
- The South Inch in 2024

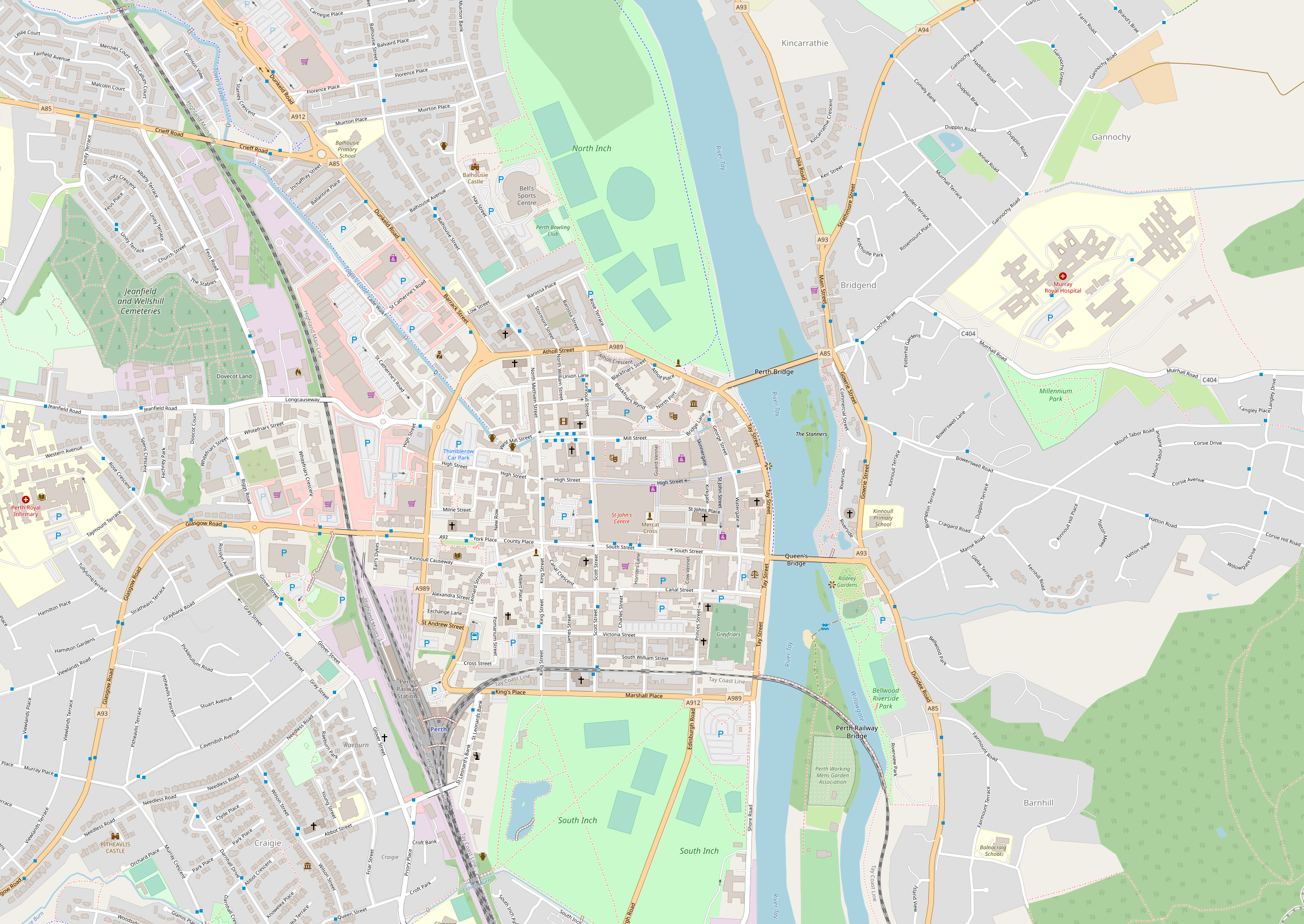
- Location within Perth
- Type: Urban park
- Location: Perth, Scotland, United Kingdom
- Coordinates: 56.3904°N 3.4332°W
- Area: 31 hectares (77 acres)
- Created: 1374
- Owner: Perth and Kinross Council
- Operator: Perth and Kinross Council

South Inch is a large public park in Perth, Scotland. About 31 hectares (77 acres) in size, it is one of two "Inches" in Perth, the other being the larger, 57-hectare (140-acre) North Inch, located half a mile across the city. The Inches were granted to the city, when it was a royal burgh, by King Robert II in 1374. Both Inches were once islands in the River Tay. The two Inches are connected by Tay Street.

The park is bounded by King's Place and Marshall Place (both part of the A989, the latter named for Perth lord provost Thomas Hay Marshall) to the north, Shore Road to the east and South Inch View and South Inch Terrace at its southern extremity. Its western boundary abuts the rear of the homes on St Leonard's Bank, which was laid out by Perth architect William Macdonald Mackenzie in 1828. The north-south running A912 Edinburgh Road, opened around 1760, passes through the park's eastern third. The eastern side of the park is known as the Lesser South Inch.

Two paths diagonally dissect the main part of the park. The start of the path that originates from the northwest corner, at the foot of King Street, is overlooked by a statue of Sir Walter Scott, author of The Fair Maid of Perth in 1828. The statue, a Category C listed monument, is the work of the Cochrane brothers, and was completed in 1845 as one of their final works before leaving for Canada. It was accidentally acquired by the city magistrates at the sale of a local sculptor's stock. The part of the statue of Scott's dog, Maida, was stolen in 2020. It was also stolen in 2016.

Craigie Burn enters the inch at its southwestern corner, via a tunnel, after passing beneath the Highland Main Line railway. It then runs along the inch's southern edge before going underground and exiting into the Tay.

The category C listed buildings at 1 and 2 St Leonard's Bank, currently occupied by the Parklands Hotel, overlook the Inch's northwestern corner.

== History ==
The Transport Cafe occupied the South Inch's now-demolished pavilion in 1972. A car park now occupies the location

In 1651, Oliver Cromwell came to Perth following his victory in the Battle of Dunbar and established a fortified citadel in the northeast corner of the inch, using stone from the Our Lady's Chapel he demolished and from headstones taken from Greyfriars Burial Ground. It was one of five occupation forts built to control Scotland.

The inch was formerly used as a bleachfield, as well as for cattle grazing and horse racing, which was first recorded there in 1613. Cattle markets appeared at the inch from 1785.

The Priory of St Leonard, founded in the 13th century, once overlooked the southern end of the Inch from the western side, in the area where St Leonard's Bridge crosses the railway tracks today. It was suppressed in 1429 and its lands and rents were annexed by the Carthusian monastery that had been founded. There was a church dedicated to St Leonard at Perth as early as 1163. Priory Place, beginning at Craigie Cross, recalls the building.

In 1815, Muir & Martin established the South Inch Brewery.

From 1928 to the 1970s, a pavilion stood at the northeastern corner of the inch, at the junction of Marshall Place and the Edinburgh Road, replacing a temporary one that stood beside the later location of the bowling greens.

== Leisure ==
A former boating lake is located in the southwest corner of the inch.

Two bowling greens, the home of the South Inch Bowling Club until 2012, formerly occupied the northwestern corner, just inside the entrance. The property had become a target for vandals. They were torn up before the bowling club folded. The pavilion still remains, and is now a cafe. A similar previous venture was ended after Perth and Kinross Council put out an invitation to tender for the location.

A crazy golf course, putting green and adjacent trampoline park existed up until the late 20th century in the area now occupied by a children's playground.

== Community and entertainment ==
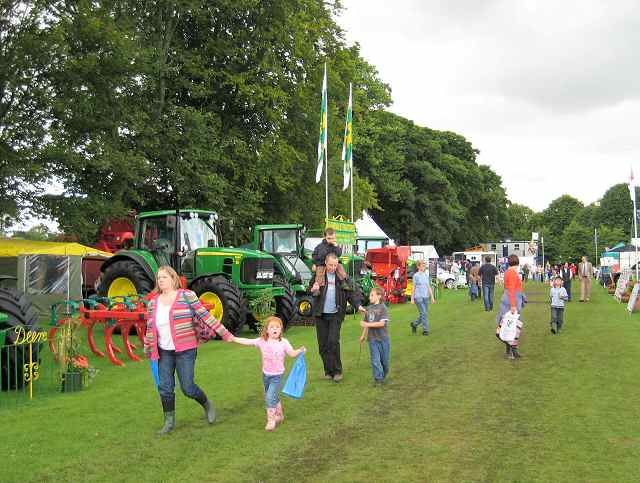
The 2008 Perth Show

The Lesser South inch is the location for the annual Perth Highland Games and Perth Show. A skate park is also in that section.

Perth Farmers' Market takes place on the Lesser South Inch on the first Saturday of every month (except January).

Party at the Park is scheduled to take place at the South Inch over the weekend of 27 and 28 June 2021.

== Gallery ==
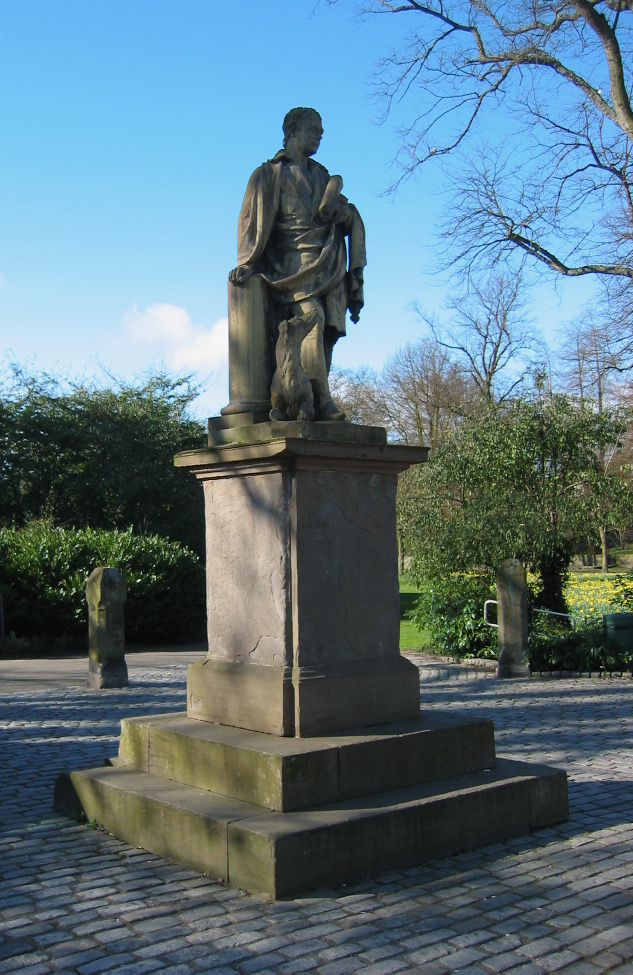
Statue of Sir Walter Scott at the northwestern entrance to the inch

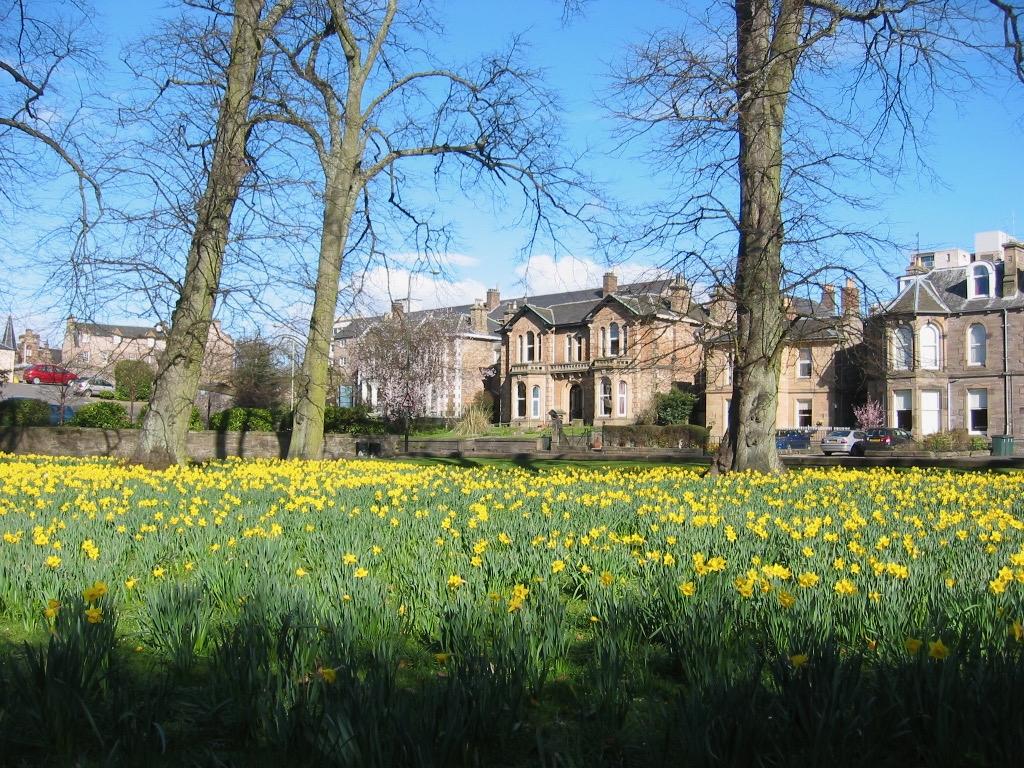
King's Place from the northern edge of the inch

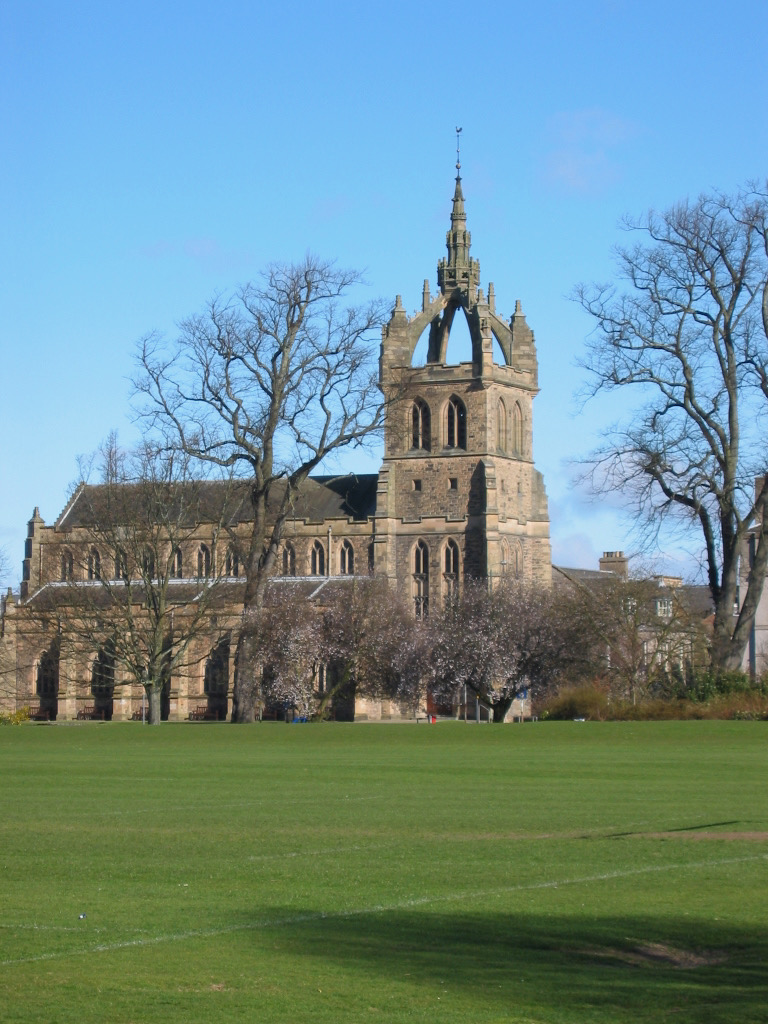
St Leonard's-in-the-Fields Church from the inch

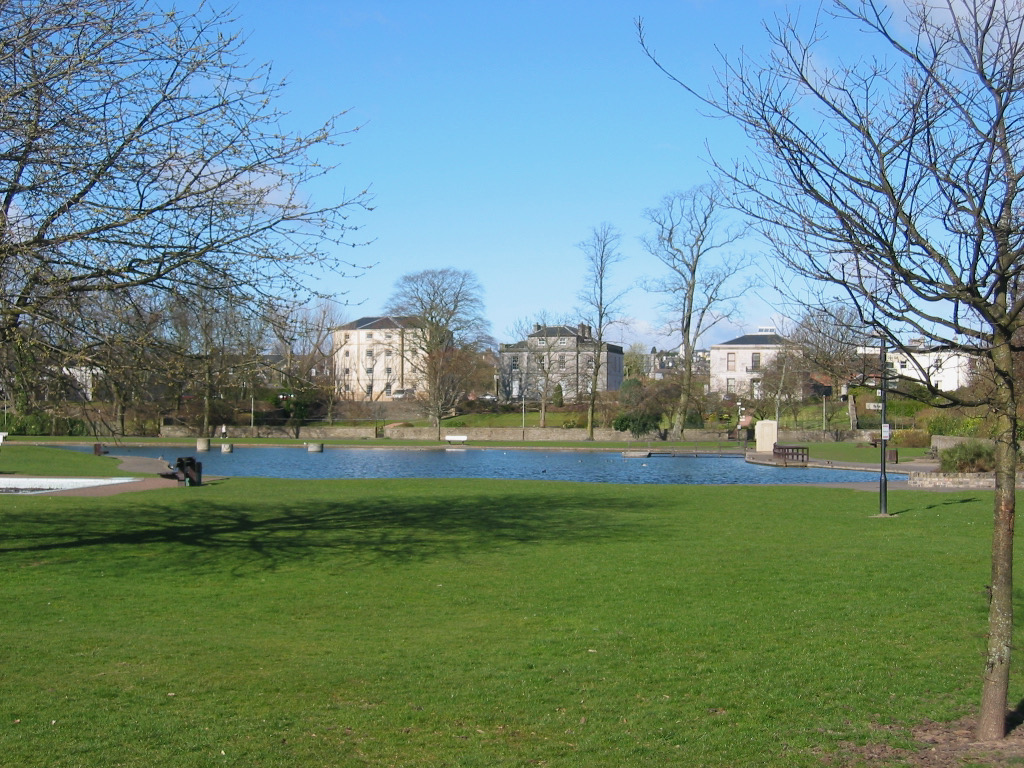
The boating lake in 2006, with St Leonard's Bank in the background

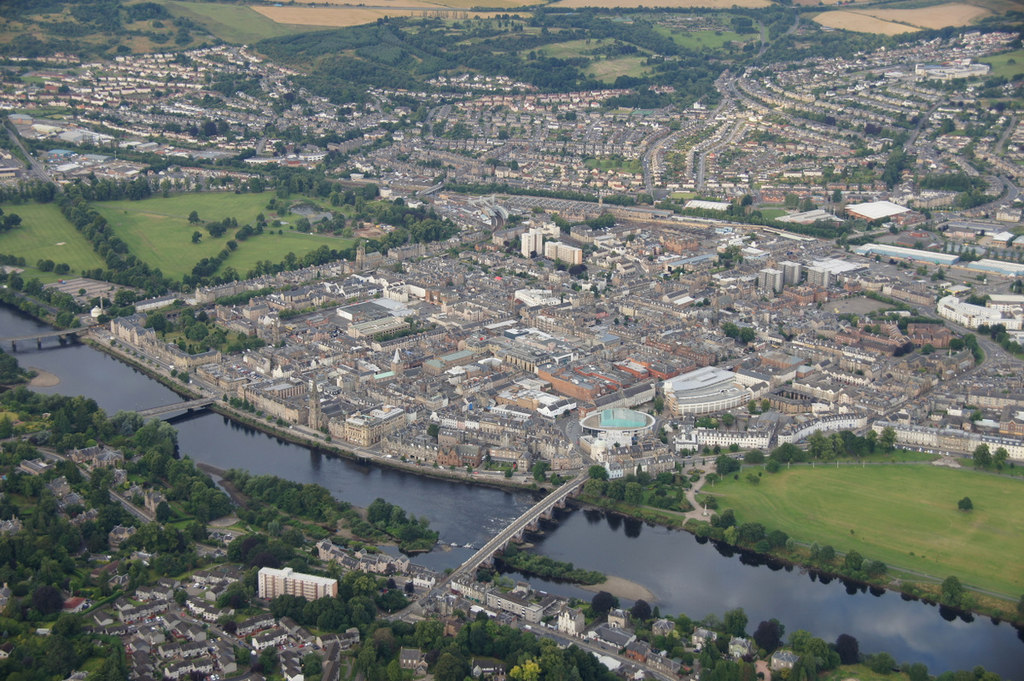
The South Inch is on the left in this aerial view of the city
