= Elizabeth Dunbar =

Daughter of George I, and Prioress of St Leonard's Nunnery, Perth, Scotland

Lady Elizabeth Dunbar (died before March 1494) was the prioress of Hospital of St Leonard's or St Leonard's Nunnery in Perth, Scotland. She had earlier been engaged to a future King of Scotland and was the subject of a play based on his rejection of her.

== Early life and family ==
Lady Elizabeth was the daughter of George I, Earl of March. She married Archibald Douglas, third son of James, seventh Earl of Douglas before 26 April 1442. She subsequently married a total of three times.

Lady Elizabeth had been the rejected fiancée of the Duke of Rothesay, who was in line to the Scottish throne. The authors Michael Field created a play based on this called The Father's Tragedy.

== St Leonard's Nunnery ==
From 1411-1438, Lady Elizabeth was the prioress of Hospital of St Leonard's or St Leonard's Nunnery in Perth.
