= Rose Terrace (Perth, Scotland) =

Prominent street in Perth, Scotland

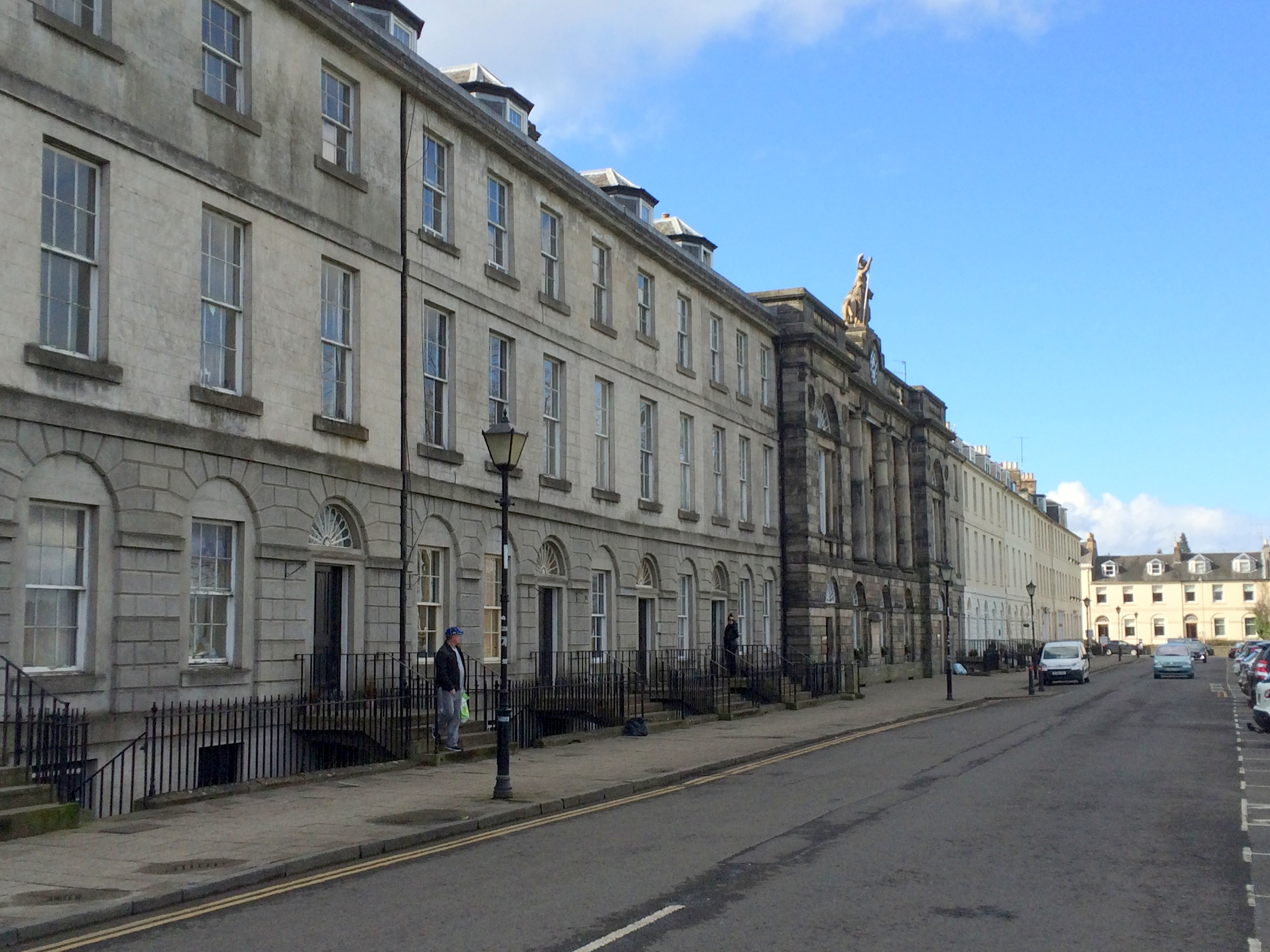
- Rose Terrace, looking north to Barossa Place
- Interactive map of Rose Terrace
- Length: 0.12 mi (0.19 km)
- Location: Perth, Perth and Kinross, Scotland
- North end: Barossa Place
- South end: Atholl Street

Rose Terrace is a street of Georgian architecture in the Scottish city of Perth, Perth and Kinross, dating to at least the late 18th century. It is named for Rosie Anderson, the wife of former Perth lord provost Thomas Hay Marshall, who donated the land. The couple lived at the corner of Rose Terrace and Atholl Street.

Overlooking the southwestern edge of the North Inch, one of Perth's two large parks, Rose Terrace is the home of the Old Academy, a Category A listed building, built between 1803 and 1807. It was the home of Perth Academy between 1807 and 1932.

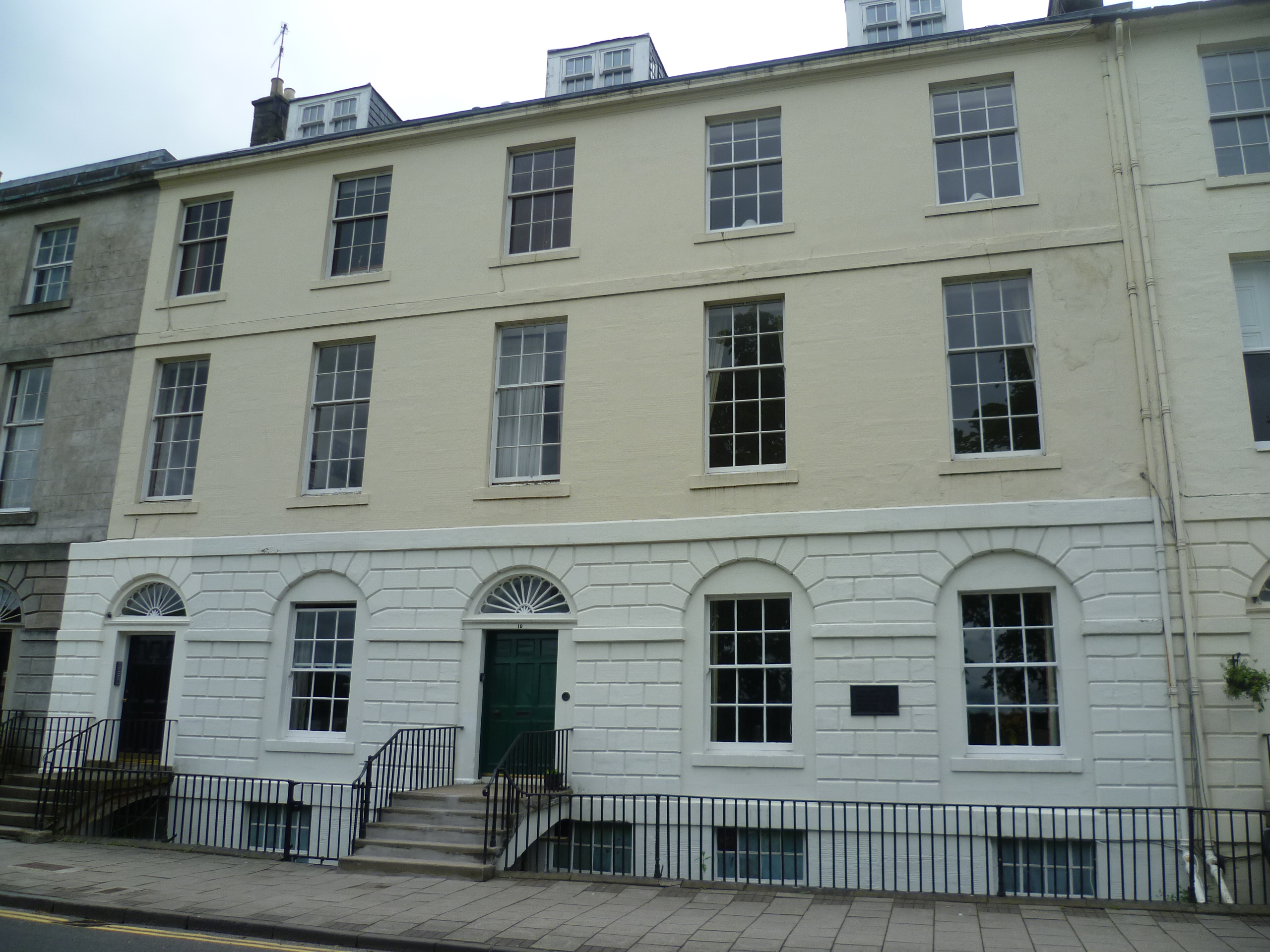
8–12 Rose Terrace

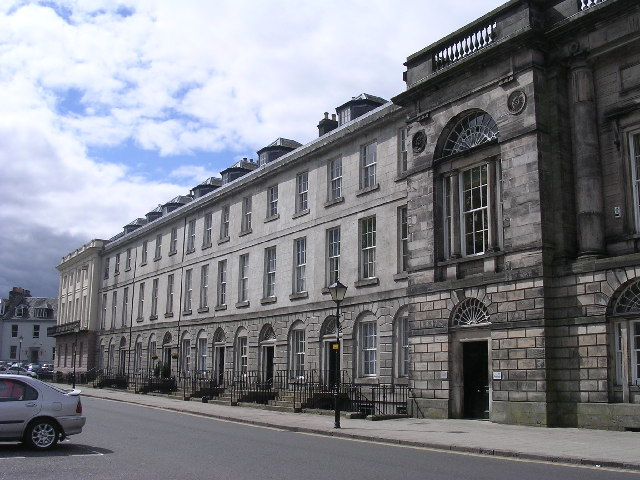
And south to Atholl Street

== Map ==
This 1832 map of Perth, by James Gardner, shows Rose Terrace as being fully formed, though not yet with a name

== Notable buildings and structures ==
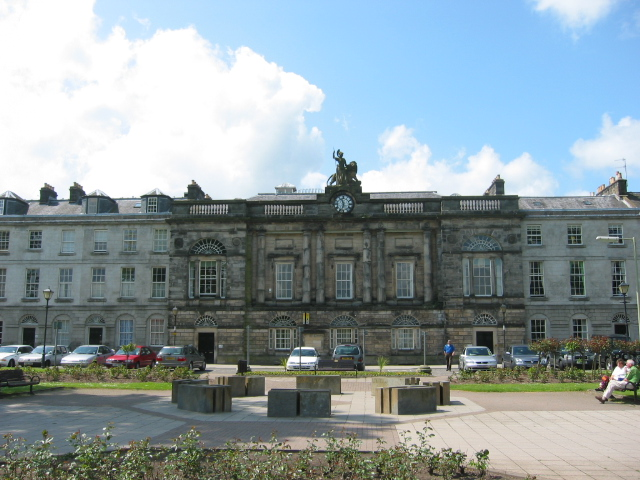
The Old Academy building, 6–7 Rose Terrace

Below is a selection of notable buildings and structures on Rose Terrace, ordered from south to north. All six are listed buildings at Historic Environment Scotland.

- 2 Atholl Street (corner property)
- 1–5 Rose Terrace
- Old Academy, 6–7 Rose Terrace
- 8–12 Rose Terrace
- 13–16 Rose Terrace
- 17 Rose Terrace
