= Thomas Earp (sculptor) =

British sculptor and architectural carver (1828–1893)

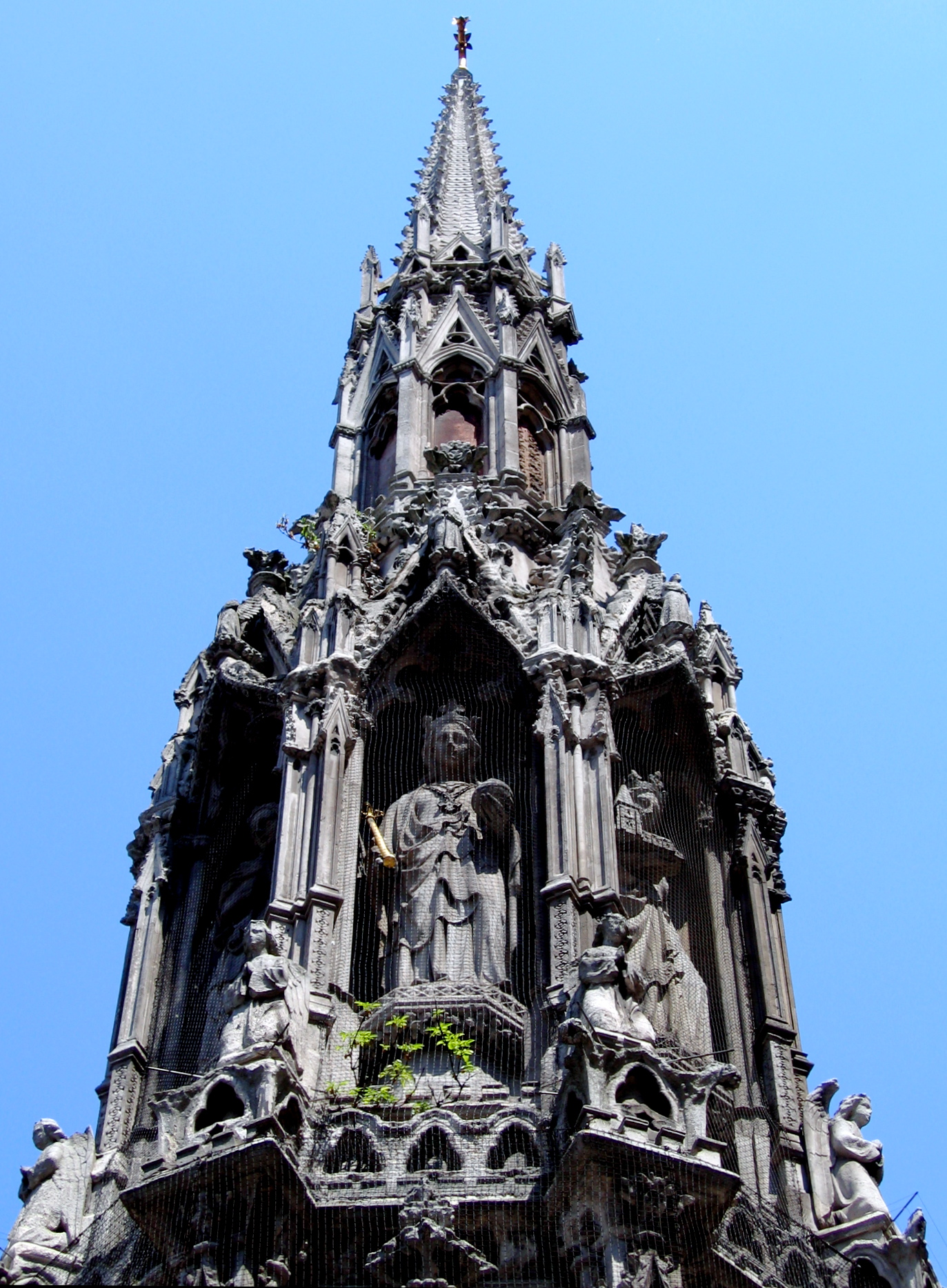
- Earp's Eleanor Cross at Charing Cross in London
- Born: 1828; Nottingham, England
- Died: 1893 (aged 64–65)
- Known for: Sculpture, stone carving

Thomas Earp (1828–1893) was a British sculptor and architectural carver who was active in the late 19th century. His best known work is his 1863 reproduction of the Eleanor Cross which stands at Charing Cross in London. He specialised in sculpture for Gothic Revival churches and worked closely with the architect George Edmund Street in the 1860s and 1870s.

== Early life and career ==
Earp was born in Nottingham, England. He studied at the Nottingham School of Art and Design and after completing his studies in the early 1850s went to work for the building contractor George Myers (who himself worked extensively for Pugin) in London.

Around 1851 Earp founded his own architectural sculpture practice. By 1864 he was established at 1 Kennington Road, Lambeth, and employed 24 people. One of his projects, a marble and alabaster reredos, pulpit and baptismal font for the Church of St John the Baptist, Huntley, was particularly acclaimed and was exhibited at the Great Exhibition of 1862.

== Earp and Hobbs Ltd ==
Earp's practice expanded in 1864 when he went into partnership with another sculptor, Edwin Hobbs Senior (c. 1841–1904). Together they opened premises in Chorlton-upon-Medlock, Manchester on Lower Mosley Street, later moving to premises in Moss Side. While Hobbs was based in Manchester, Earp worked from the London office at 32 Canterbury Place, Lambeth Walk. In the late 1880s the business was renamed Earp, Son and Hobbs, and by 1900 it was trading as Earp and Hobbs Ltd. Thomas Earp's son, Edgar Earp worked in the practice along with Edwin Hobbs Junior.

== Works ==
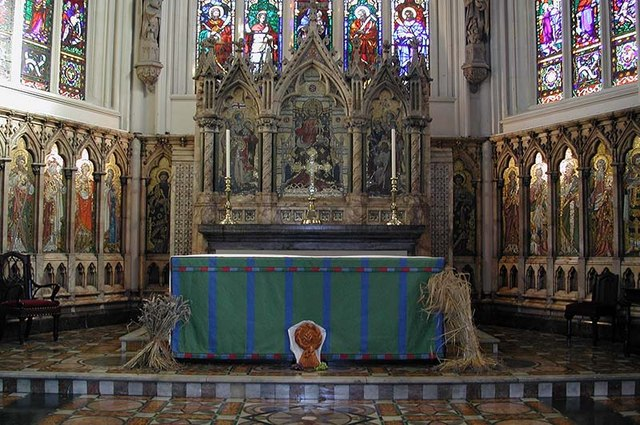
Earp's reredos at Leeds Parish Church

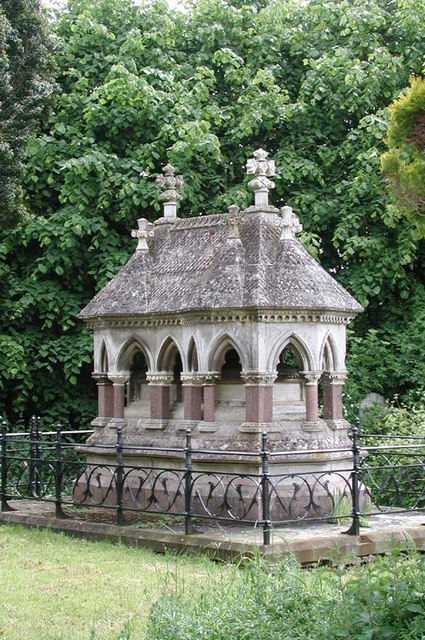
Horton family mausoleum at Middleton Cheney, Northamptonshire

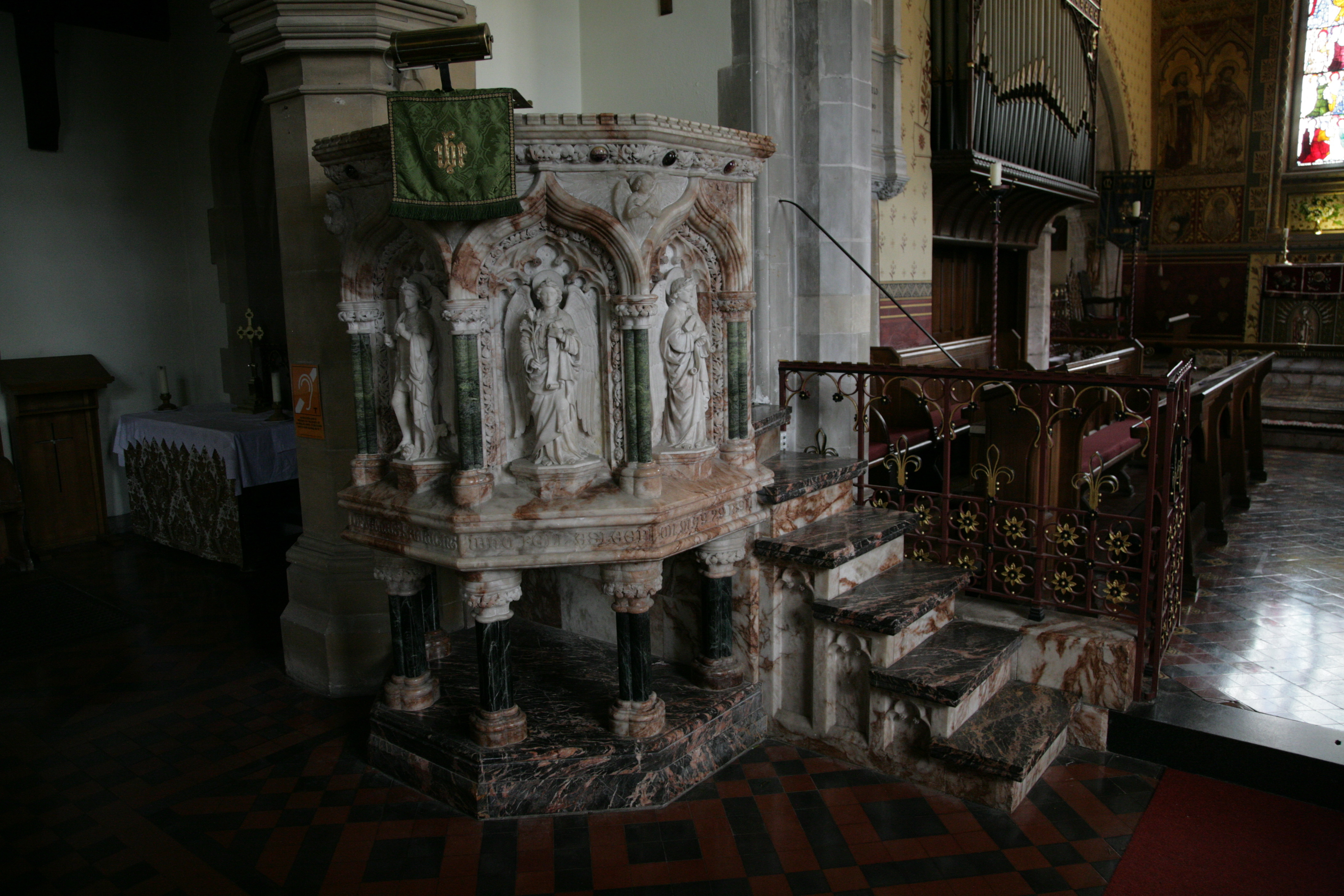
Earp's pulpit at St Michael and All Angels, Hughenden. The pulpit is carved with the figures of the archangels Michael, Gabriel, and Uriel

Works include:

- Pulpit, Church of St James the Less, Pimlico, London (1862)
- Reredos, St James's Episcopal Church, Leith (1862–1865)
- Architectural detail, St Silas's Church, Glasgow (designed by John Honeyman, 1864)
- Queen Eleanor Memorial Cross, Charing Cross, London (designed by E. M. Barry, 1864–65)
- Carving at Shadwell Court, Brettenham, Norfolk, for Samuel Sanders Teulon (1865–1860). Although Historic England records Teulon's carver as "unknown", Mark Girouard suggests Earp, a view also adopted by Pevsner
- Horton family mausoleum, All Saints' churchyard, Middleton Cheney, Northamptonshire (designed by William Wilkinson, 1866–67)
- Carving at City Police Courts, Manchester (designed by Thomas Worthington, 1867–1873)
- Architectural detail, St James's Church, Milnrow, Lancashire (designed by G. E. Street, 1868–69)
- Carving at The Towers, Didsbury, Manchester (designed by Thomas Worthington, 1868–1872)
- Crucifixion scene above the altar, Church of St Thomas à Becket in South Cadbury (1870)
- Reredos in the Lady Chapel, St Margaret's Convent of the Ursulines of Jesus, The Grange, Edinburgh (1877)
- Annunciation group, Cathedral Church of St Marie, Sheffield (1879)
- Reredos, Cathedral Church of St Andrew, Sydney (1886)
- Baptismal font in St Mary's Church, Portsea (1889)
- Baptismal font in Rochester Cathedral (1893)
- St John the Divine, Kennington, London
- Holy Trinity Church, Hastings
- St Leonard's Church, Bridgnorth
- St Jude's Church, Kensington, London
- Pulpit, St Michael and All Angels Church, Hughenden, Buckinghamshire
- Pulpit, Christ Church Cathedral, Dublin
- Effigy of Mrs Rowley, part of the Rowley Memorial, Parish Church of St Mary the Virgin, St Neots, Cambridgeshire
- Reredos at St Peter, Kirkgate, Leeds
- Reredos at St Mary Magdalene, Paddington
- Pulpit, Holy Trinity Church, Gosport (designed by Arthur Blomfield, executed by Earp)
