= Henry Wood Hall =

Henry Wood Hall is the name of two orchestral performance halls in the United Kingdom named after the conductor Sir Henry Wood:

- Henry Wood Hall, Glasgow
- Henry Wood Hall, London
