= Holy Trinity Church, Gosport =

Coordinates: 50°47′33.7956″N 01°07′11.3412″W

Holy Trinity Gosport
- Church of the Holy and Undivided Trinity
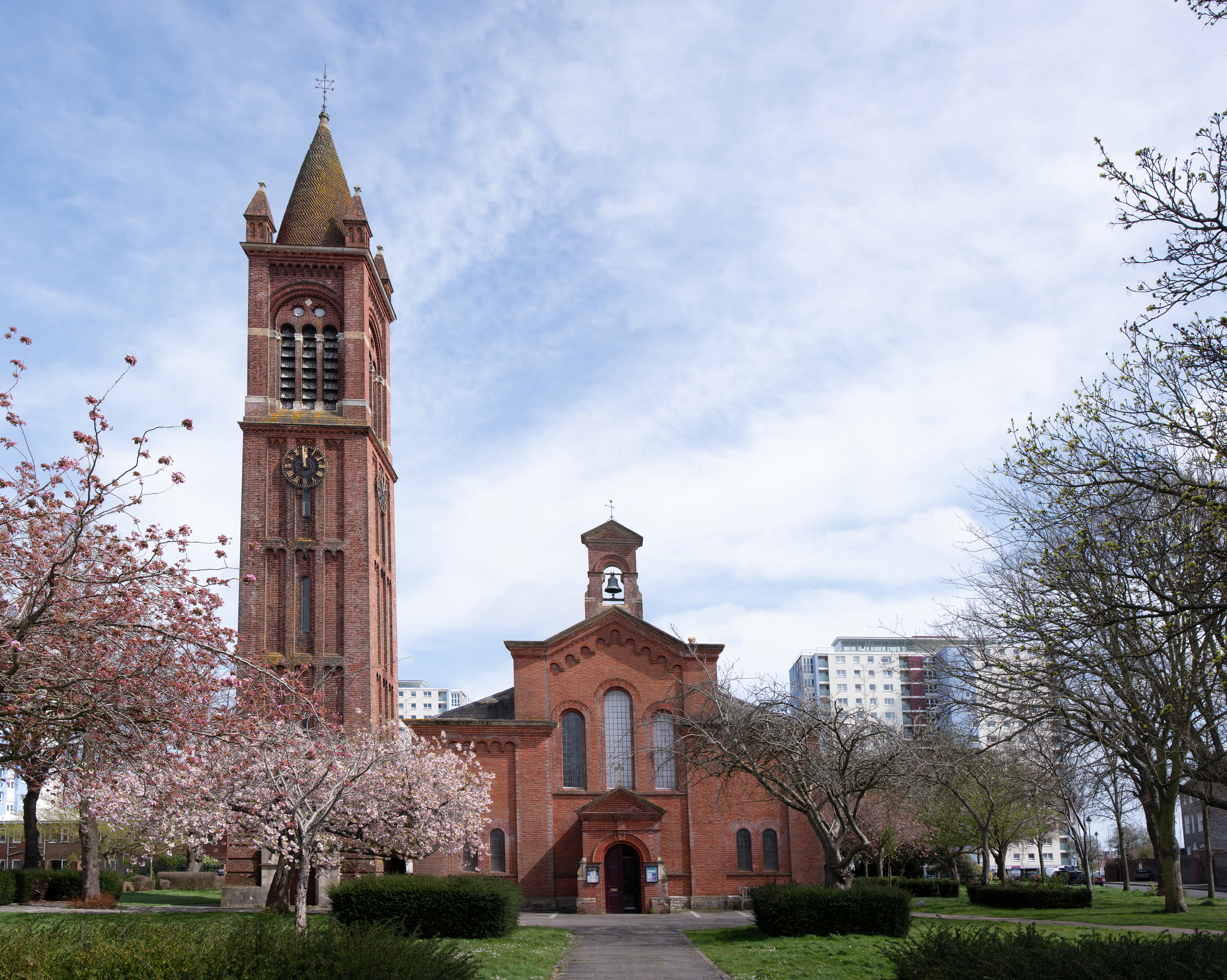
- Holy Trinity Gosport
- OS grid reference: SZ 62125 99649
- Location: Gosport, Hampshire
- Country: England
- Denomination: Church of England
- Tradition: Anglo-Catholic
- Website: holytrinitygosport.org.uk

History
- Founded: 1696

Architecture
- Heritage designation: Grade II* listed building
- Architect(s): Thomas Ellis Owen, Thomas Hellyer, Arthur Blomfield
- Style: Victorian exterior with Italianate campanile and Classical style interior

Administration
- Diocese: Portsmouth

Clergy
- Priest: Fr Godfrey Chigumira

Holy Trinity is a Church of England church in the Anglo-Catholic tradition in Gosport, Hampshire, within the Anglican Diocese of Portsmouth.

It is the civic church for the Gosport deanery and hosts commemorative events and the annual mayor's carol service.

The church is famous for its Grade II* listed organ, which was purchased in 1747 by the parishioners from the 1st Duke of Chandos and is believed to have been played by Handel.

== History ==
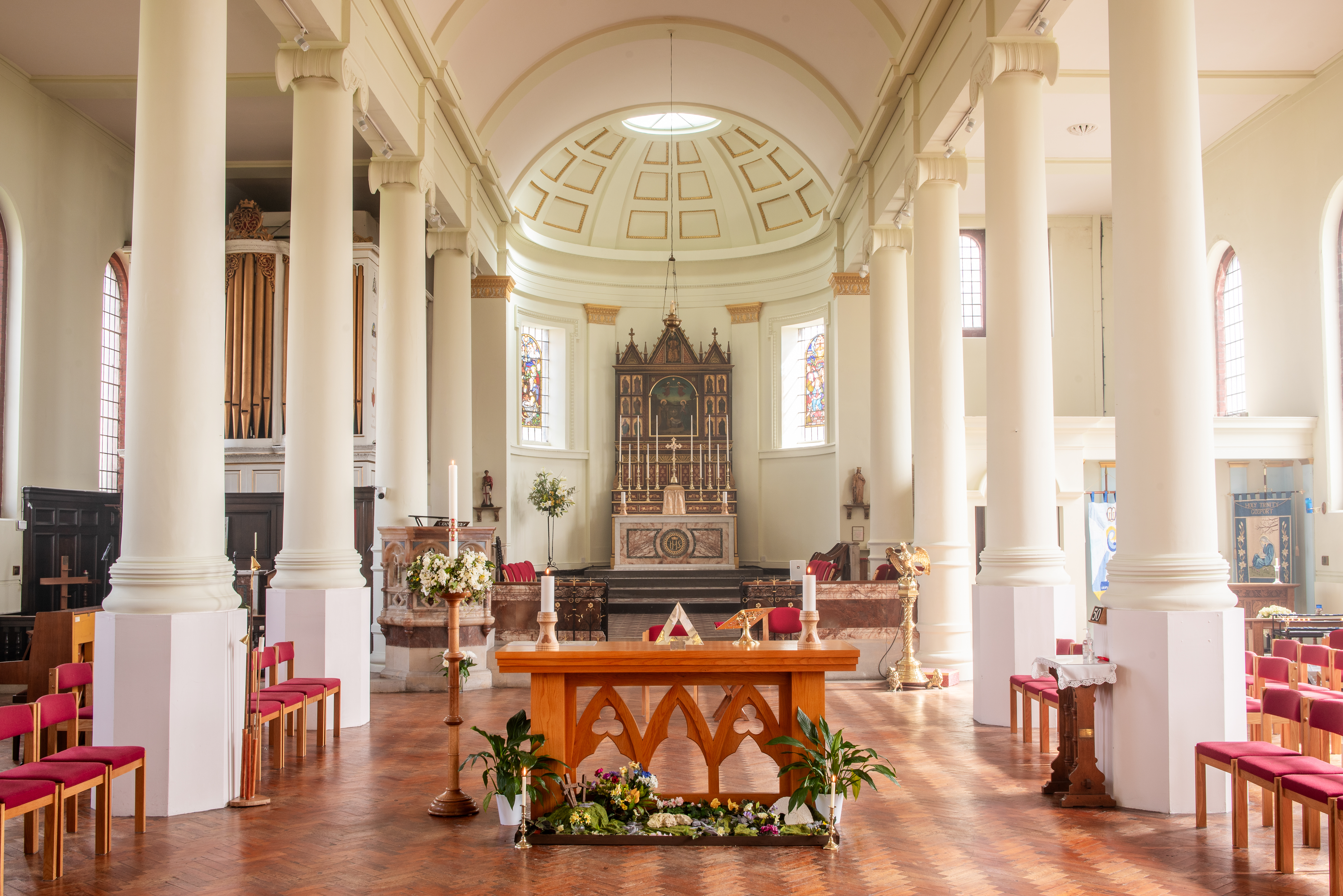
Interior of Holy Trinity Gosport

=== Founding ===
Holy Trinity Gosport was consecrated in 1696 by Peter Mews, the Bishop of Winchester, who had given the land.

It was originally built as a chapel of ease to the church of St Mary, Alverstoke as the town of Gosport was fast expanding and St Mary's was becoming overburdened. The bishop sent 14 oak trees from his estate at Farnham Castle to use as pillars inside the new church, transporting them to Gosport by ox and cart. The interior of the church was built to a classical style with ionic colonnades, white walls and a barrel vault ceiling.

Holy Trinity was assigned as its own parish in 1860.

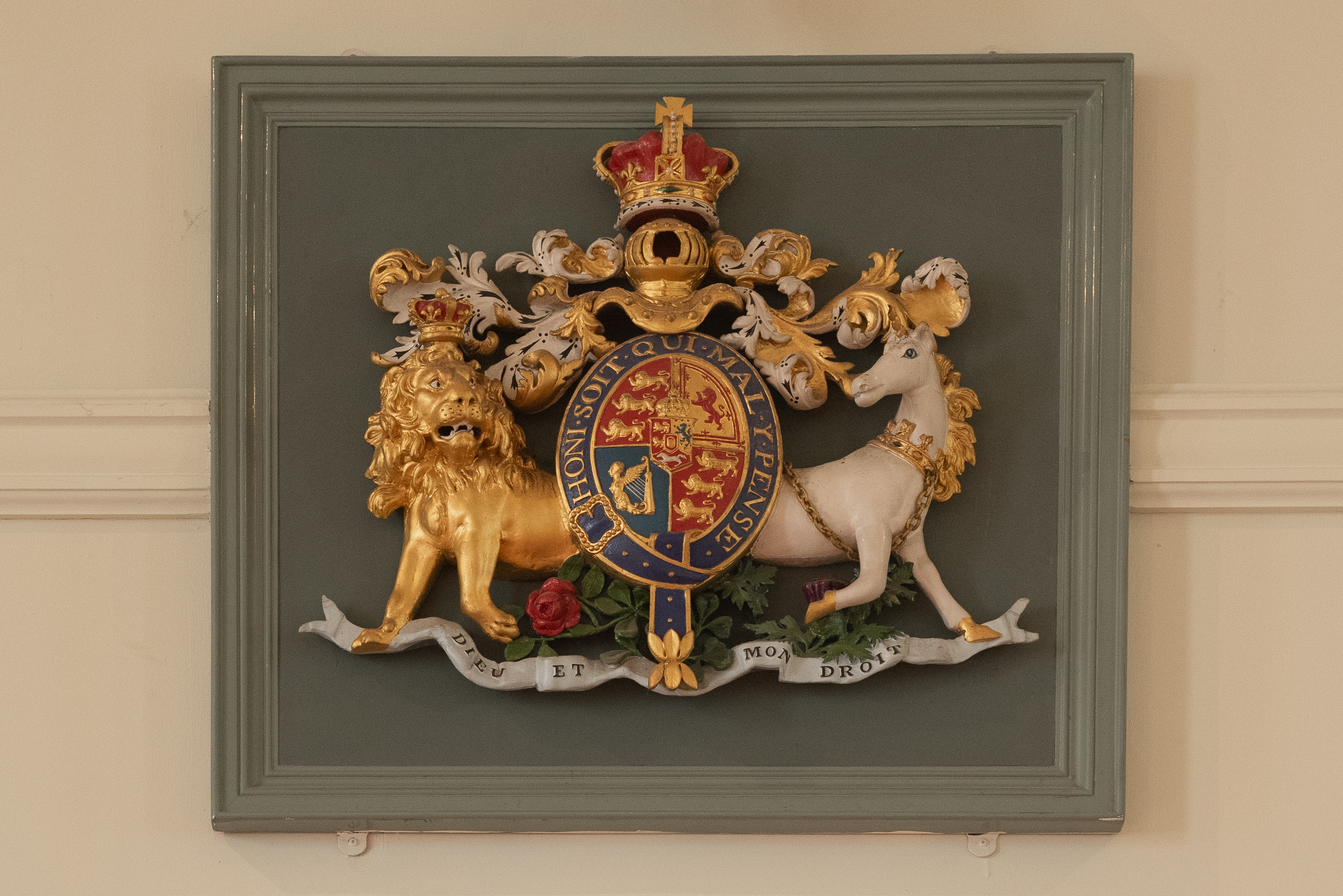
Coat of arms of the United Kingdom above the West door.

=== Reconstruction ===
Since it was first built in 1696, Holy Trinity has undergone several alterations. In 1730, a fast-growing population and lack of convenient seating led to a gallery being built on the north side of the chapel and a portico added to the west end. In 1745, another 60 pews were added. In 1828–30 a new west front was built to the design of Thomas Ellis Owen. In 1867 the church was re-pewed, a new altar was inserted and chancel formed, with Thomas Hellyer as architect.

The church underwent substantial remodelling in 1887 by architect, Arthur Blomfield, to mark Queen Victoria's Golden Jubilee. The whole exterior, which had previously been stuccoed, was refaced in red brick, the windows were re-formed, and a bellcote was added over the east gable.

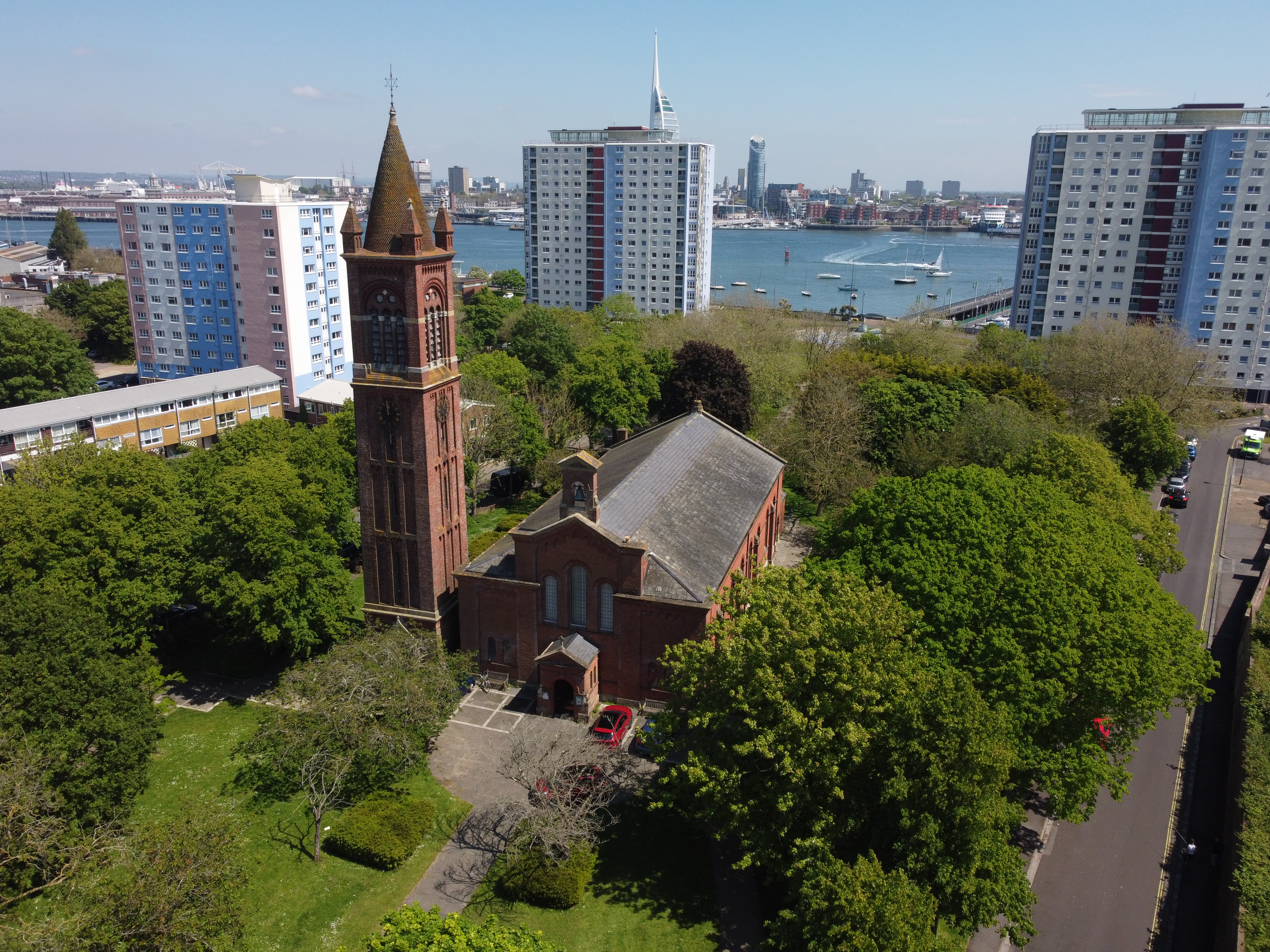
A birdseye view of the church looking over to Portsmouth Harbour.

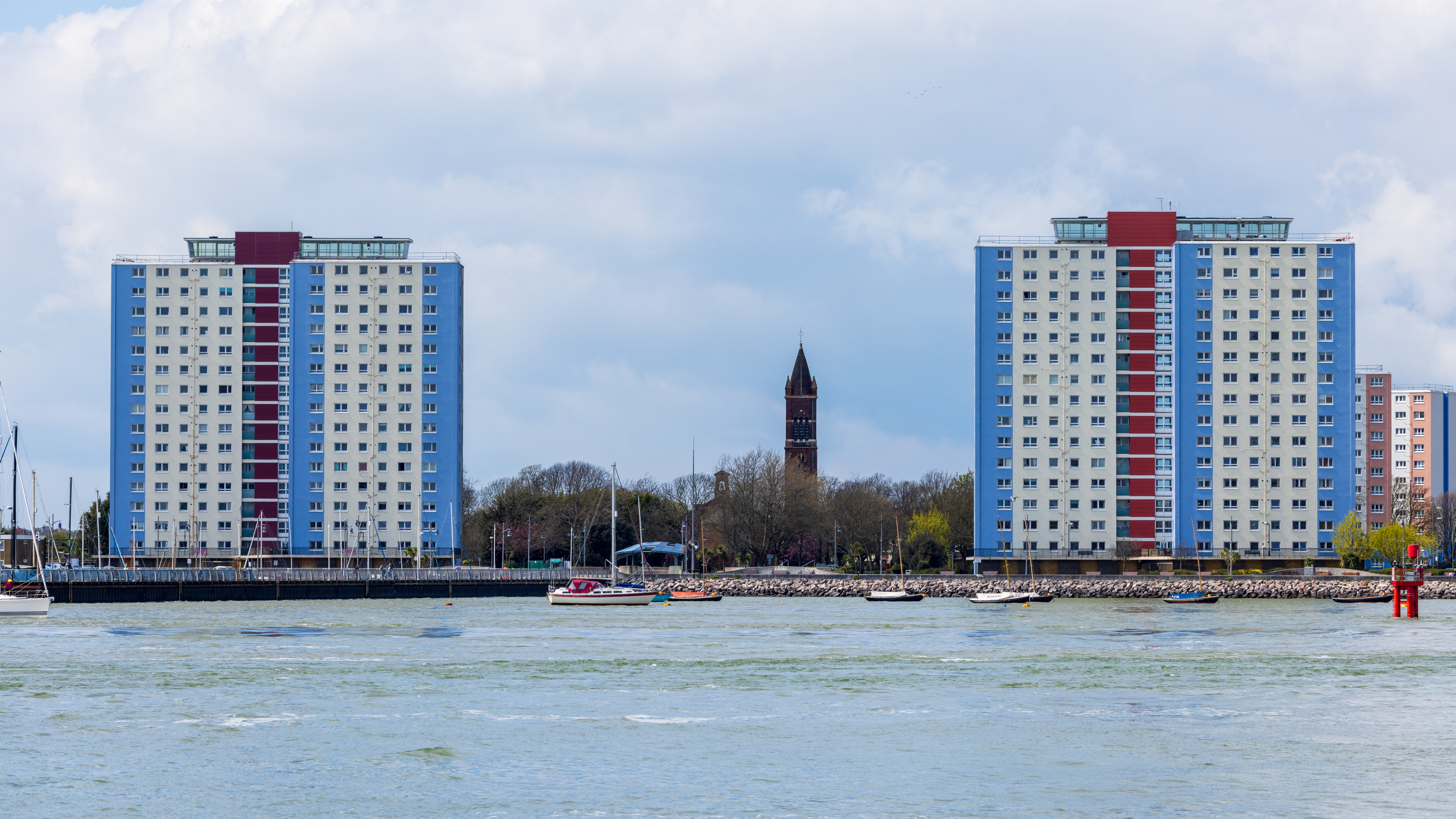
Holy Trinity's campanile as viewed from Portsmouth Harbour.

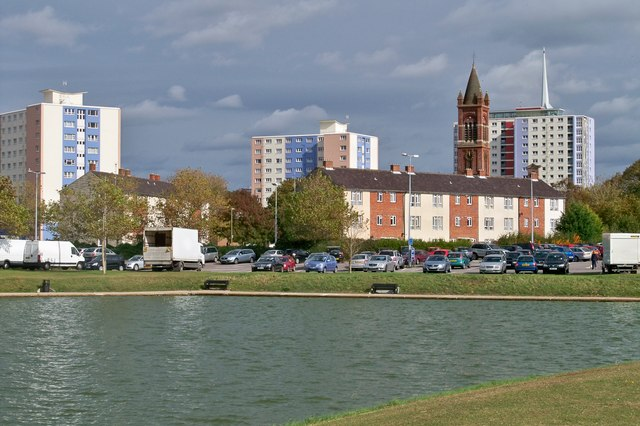
Holy Trinity's campanile as viewed from Walpole Park.

Internally, Blomfield would have liked to redesign the church in his preferred neo-Gothic style, but its classical colonnades made this impossible. Instead, he added an iron screen across the west end of the building, installed a new altar from St Agatha's, Landport and removed the galleries.

Holy Trinity has thus ended up with an unusual fusion of architectural styles – a Victorian façade, but with a classical interior ordered for Anglo-Catholic worship.

Nikolaus Pevsner said, of Blomfield's work:

"He turned the old plain building with its low-pitched nave, tall, steep-pitched aisles, and apsidal chancel into a rather crude and simplified version of a Lombard basilica."

— Nikolaus B. L. Pevsner and David W. Lloyd, Hampshire and the Isle of Wight (1967)

In 1889, Blomfield added a campanile to the North West of the church. This tower has been an iconic feature of the Gosport skyline ever since and can be seen from Portsmouth Harbour.

=== Anglo-Catholicism ===
From 1858, under the incumbency of Fr William Skipsey-Saunders, Holy Trinity increasingly fell under the influence of the Oxford Movement. The reordering of the church, most notably the construction of the chancel and a new altar reflects this renewed emphasis on ritual and ceremony. The present high altar orientated for eastward celebration was installed in 1887. This period also saw the installation of the reredos and other elements, such as statues of various saints, associated with the Oxford Movement.

The church's high churchmanship was further developed under the ministry of Fr Henry Woolsey (1912–1926) who had previously been, for 17 years, a master at Hurstpierpoint College, a school of the Woodard Corporation, a group of schools founded to inculcate Anglo-Catholic belief and practice in the Victorian middle classes. Although Holy Trinity had had Tractarian leanings for 50 years by this point and celebrated weekly Communion, Matins had remained the main Sunday service. Woolsey replaced this with a Sung Mass and instituted a structure of daily Matins, Mass, and Evensong as well as popularising the practice of Confession. The use of incense was begun on Christmas Day 1913. Woolsey also founded and edited a monthly parish magazine as a means of spreading Anglo-Catholic teaching throughout the parish. His wish to introduce the reserved sacrament – a highly controversial act in late Victorian Anglicanism – was not realised until after his death.

Holy Trinity remained, however, in the 'Prayer Book Catholicism' strand of the Anglo-Catholic movement: notwithstanding the use of external elements such as vestments, bells, and lights in worship, the liturgy itself remain strictly in accordance with the canonical norms of the Book of Common Prayer. Subsequent vicars maintained this 'moderate' position, eschewing Anglo-Papalism and, although between 1993 and 2014 the parish invoked both resolutions against accepting the ordination of women, the church has never been affiliated to the traditionalist Society of the Holy Cross or Forward in Faith, nor to the liberal Society of Catholic Priests or Affirming Catholicism. As of 2020, Holy Trinity has accepted the ministry of women.

During the incumbency of Fr Ian Booth (2003-2006) the church was reordered again, with a fourth altar (in addition to the high altar and those in the Jesus and Lady chapels) placed in the centre of the nave for celebration of Mass in the round.

=== Pastoral reorganisation ===
During the incumbency of Fr Andy Davies (2007–2019), the parish of Holy Trinity became a joint benefice with the parish of Christ Church, a nearby church in the broad church tradition of Anglicanism.

In 2020, the benefice of Holy Trinity and Christ Church was reorganised by the Diocese of Portsmouth into a single parish, along with St John's Forton, which was deconsecrated and redesignated as a "mission hub". At the same time, the new parish came under the oversight of Revd Alex Wood, the rector of Harbour Church in Portsmouth, an evangelical church in the HTB network. Christ Church was re-planted in an evangelical model as part of these changes. Father Godfrey Chigumira was appointed as team vicar for Holy Trinity in July 2021 and Holy Trinity was established as a "centre of excellence for Anglo-Catholic worship".

Following the departure of Alex Wood in July 2022, Revd Ray Driscoll was appointed as lead vicar, with overall responsibility for the parish, and the formal link with Harbour Church was dissolved. Christ Church retains its evangelical reorientation, and the combined parish therefore has a wide breath of theological and liturgical diversity.

The reorganised parish of Holy Trinity, Christ Church and St John's, was named 'Gosport South' as an interim measure. and in 2023 rebranded as 'Haven Church' although the three buildings retain their traditional names. The name 'Haven' is a reference to the civic motto of Gosport Borough Council, 'God's port, our haven'.

== Present day ==
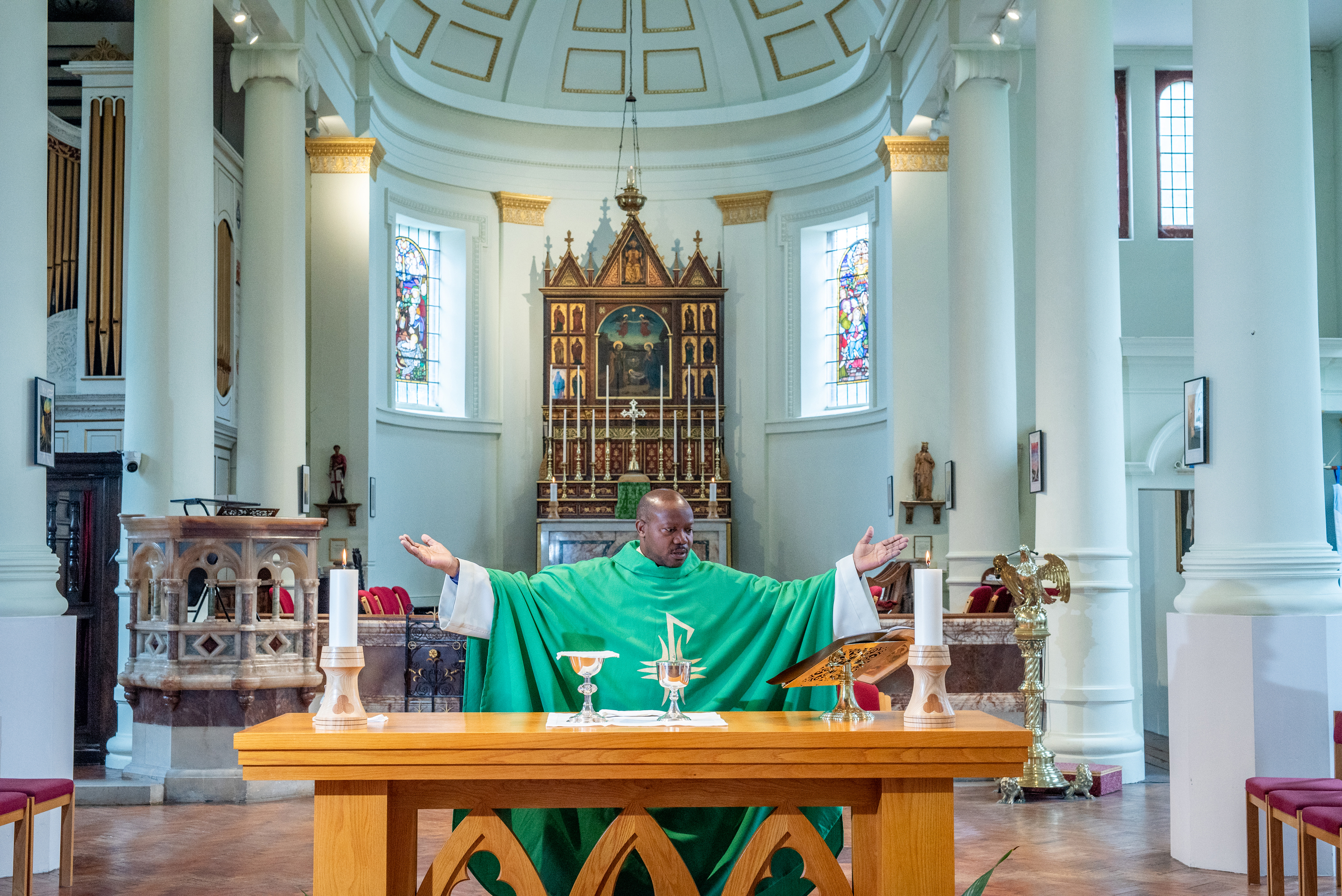
Fr Godfrey Chigumira at the altar

Holy Trinity remains an active Anglo-Catholic worshipping community, with mid-week and Sunday celebrations of Mass, as well as a weekly service of Exposition of the Blessed Sacrament and Benediction. The ceremonial is traditional and in accordance with Common Worship. The practice of the Stations of the Cross is observed in Lent and the Easter Triduum.

The church hosts a busy schedule of musical concerts as well as other arts events.

== Priests ==
- 1701: Revd William Ogilvie
- 1709: Revd William Dugarde
- 1730: Revd Charles Monckton Jnr
- 1733: Revd Thomas Symonds
- 1747: Revd Samuel Dugarde
- 1767: Revd Michael Phillips
- 1789: Revd Isaac Moody Bingham
- 1792: Revd Richard Bingham†
- 1858: Revd William Skipsey-Saunders
- 1884: Revd Oliver Ogilvie
- 1889: Revd William Lee
- 1912: Revd Henry Woolsey†
- 1927: Revd William McWaters
- 1935: Revd Canon Syril Barclay
- 1968: Fr John Capper†
- 2003: Fr Ian Booth
- 2007: Fr Andy Davis
- 2021: Fr Godfrey Chigumira

† Vicar died in post

== The 'Handel' organ ==
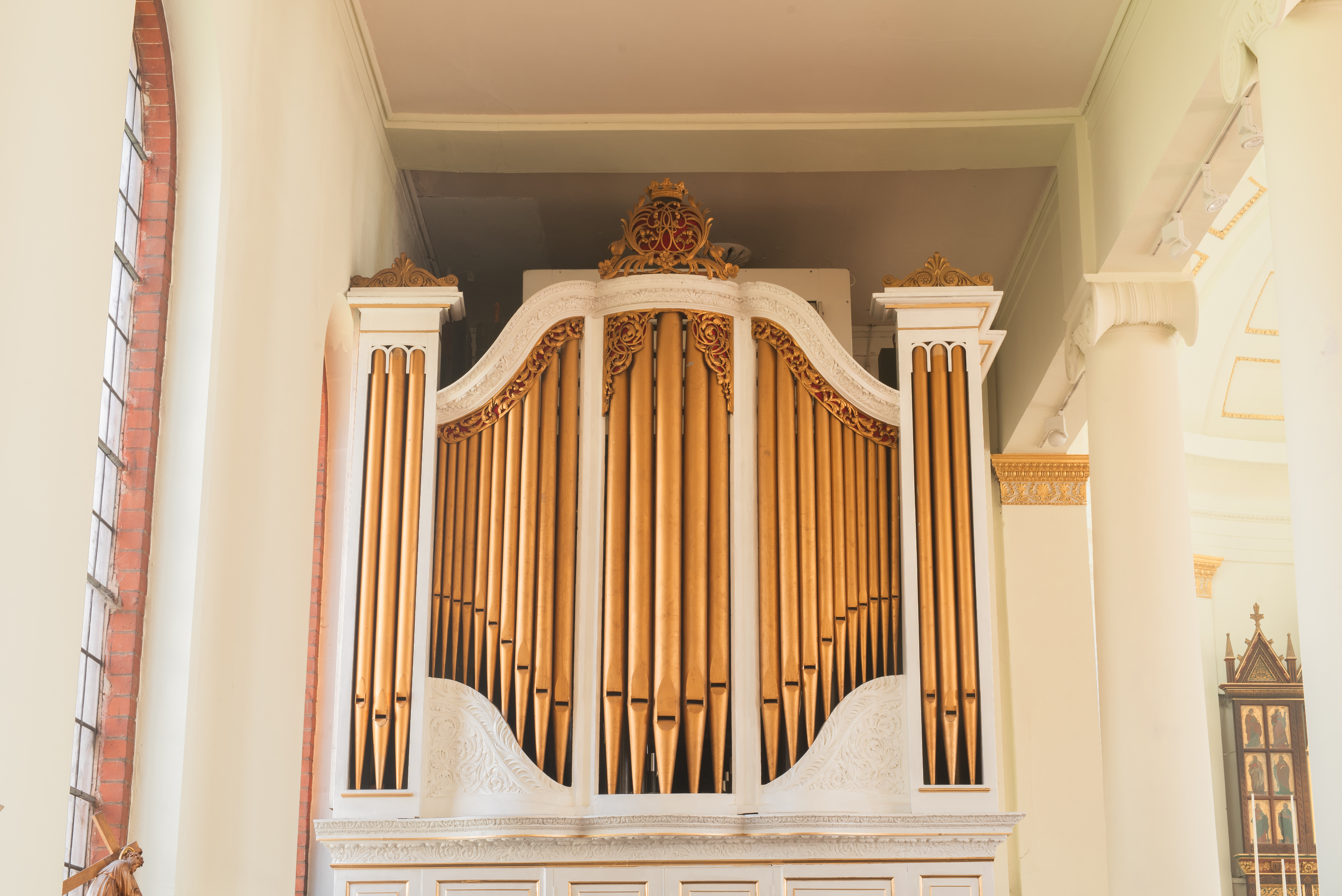
Holy Trinity's organ, believed to have been played by George Frederic Handel

Holy Trinity has a unique, Grade II* listed pipe organ, much of it nearly 300 years old. It is a manual organ of eight stops made by organ builder, Abraham Jordan, in 1720, inside a 3 manual and pedal organ of 36 stops, reconstructed in 1897 and fully restored in 2012.

George Frederic Handel was employed as the 'composer in residence' to the Duke of Chandos, at Cannons house in Middlesex. On Handel's advice, the Duke engaged Abraham Jordan, an esteemed organ builder from London, to build a 3 manual organ in his chapel, and is said to have influenced the design. Handel is also said to have played the new organ, which was used to accompany a choir of boys and men and chamber orchestra. In 1747, the Duke's heir sold off the estate. The organ is said to have been bought at auction by the parishioners of Holy Trinity for £117 and rebuilt in the west gallery in 1748.

Over the next 150 years, various organ builders maintained and changed it. In 1865, it was moved to its current position at the east end of the church, probably by William Hill. In 1897, Hill rebuilt the organ, adding more stops, changing to a new pneumatic action, and re-using the best of what remained from the Jordan 1720 instrument. Four of the stops on the great organ and five on the choir organ are original Jordan work. The oak casing of the organ was painted white in 1971.

In 2006 the organ was awarded Grade II* listed status by the British Institute of Organ Studies. The certificate reads:

The organ in Holy Trinity Church, Gosport, Hampshire, has been awarded a certificate Grade II* in recognition of it being an interesting example of an instrument by Hill & Son 1897 incorporating significant material from Jordan's organ made for the Duke of Chandos in 1720. It is therefore listed in the Institute's Register of Historic Pipe Organs as being an instrument of importance to the national heritage and one deserving careful preservation for the benefit of future generations. The certificate is held in trust for the British Institute of Organ Studies while ever this instrument is maintained in a manner consistent with its historical significance.

In 2012, the organ was completely restored, following a largescale fundraising effort and a major grant from the National Lottery Heritage Fund. It continues to be played for worship and regular organ recitals.

== Notable features ==
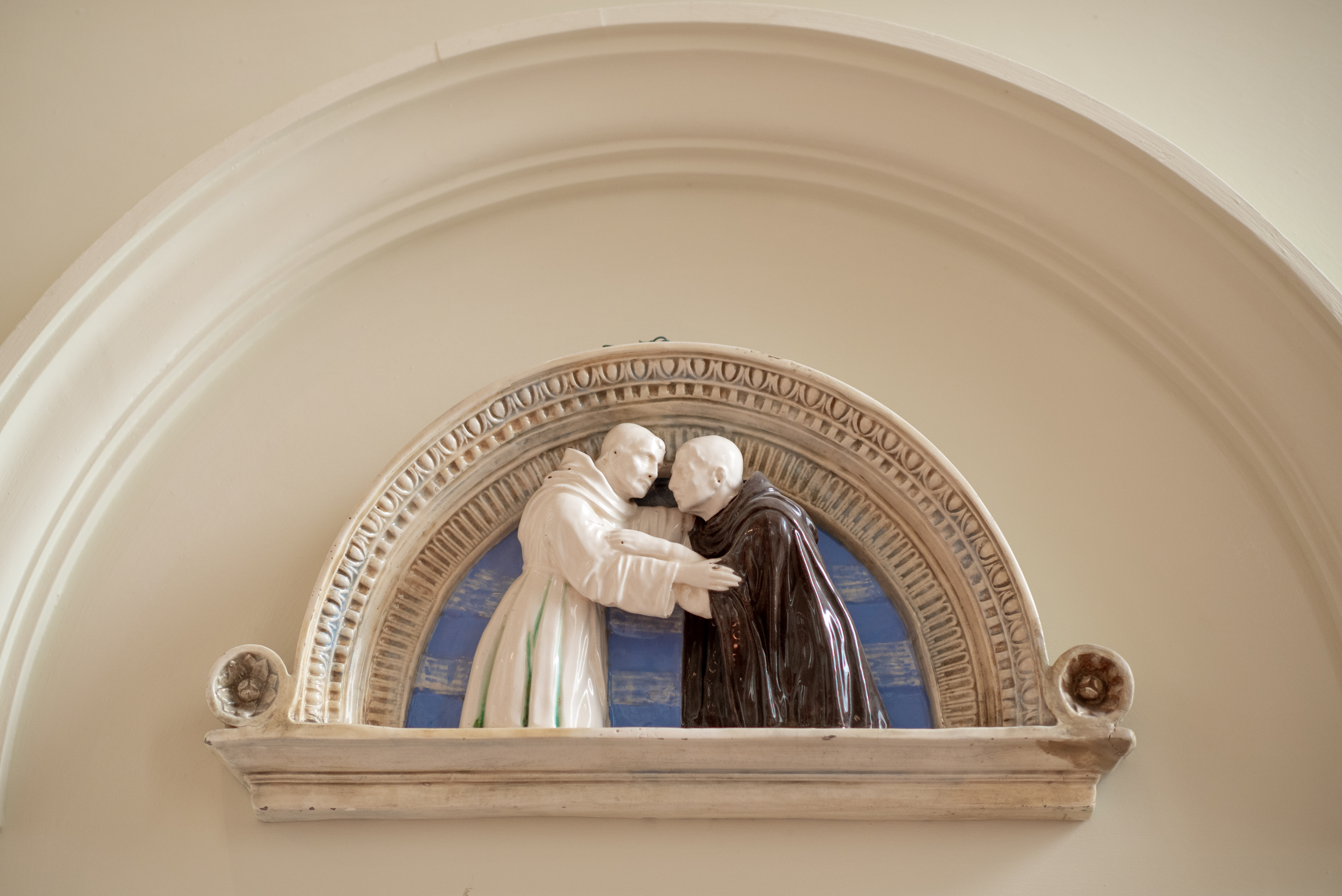
The lunette at Holy Trinity.

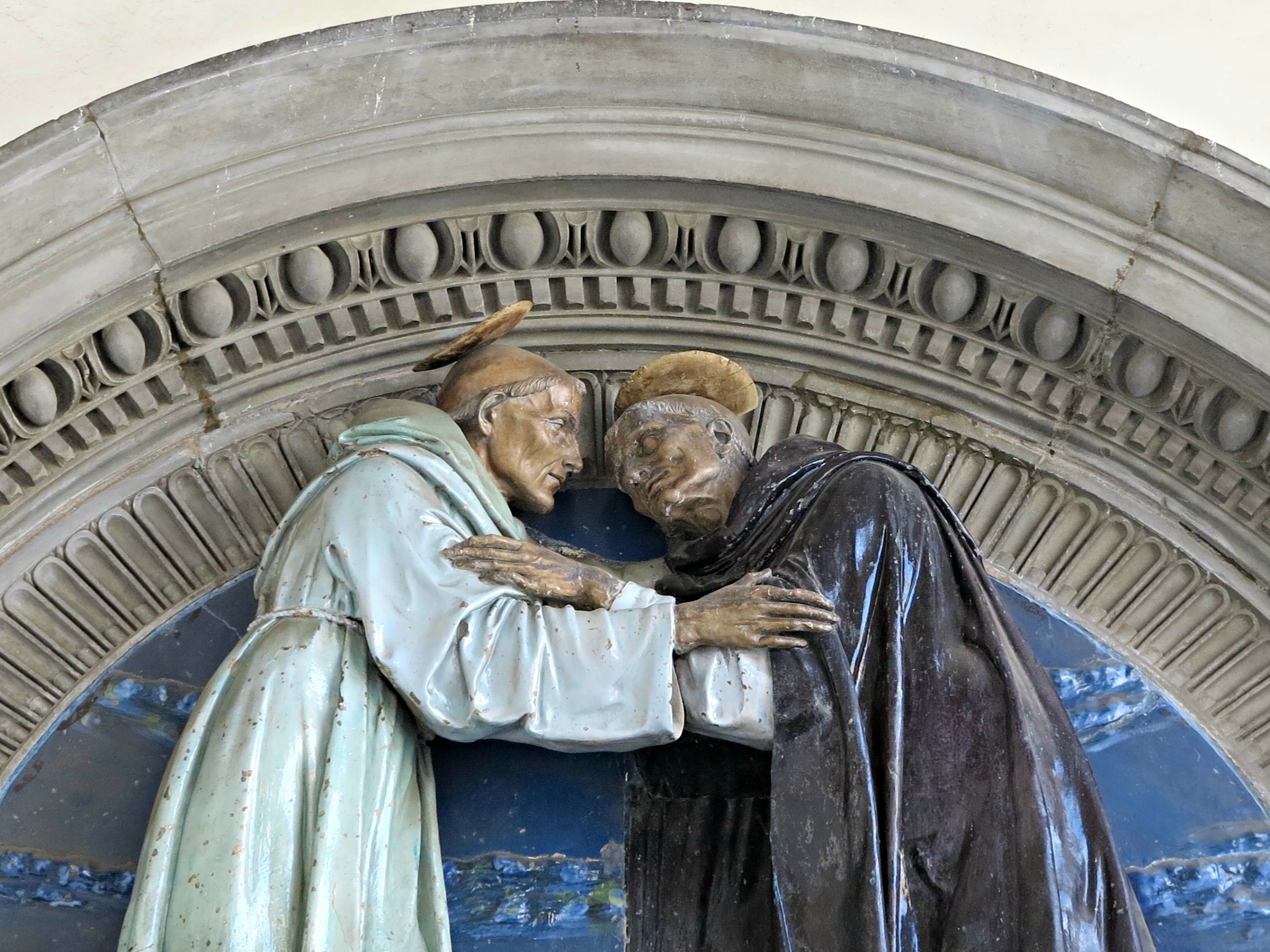
Andrea della Robbia's lunette in Florence.

=== Lunette of St Francis and St Dominic ===
Above the doorway to the choir vestry, is a polychrome, maiolica lunette of an imaginary meeting between Saint Francis and Saint Dominic, rival founders of new orders of friars.

This is a reproduction of a 15th-century piece by Renaissance artist, Andrea della Robbia, from 1489, the original of which can still be seen at the Ospedale di San Paolo in Florence.

=== Bishop of Winchester's coat of arms ===
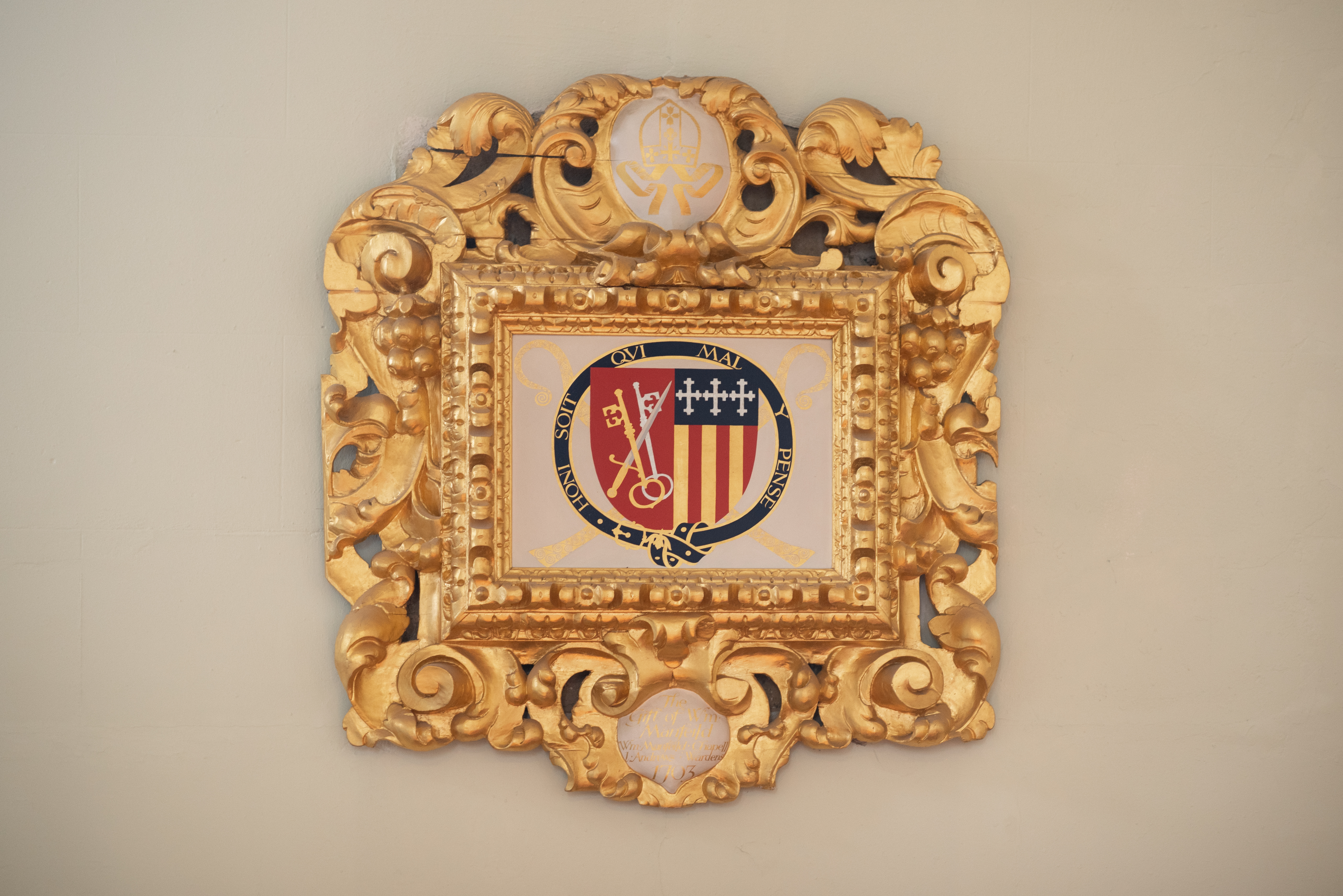
The episcopal seal on the south wall of the church, presented in 1703

Following the consecration of Holy Trinity by Peter Mews in 1696, the church wardens, William Mansfield and L Andrews, presented the Bishop with an ornately framed coat of arms in 1703. This is now fixed to the south wall of the church.

The shield is paly alternate gold and red. The upper part is blue with three cross pattée. The left half contains the arms of the Diocese of Winchester – two keys and a sword, representing St Peter and St Paul. The ribbon of the Order of the Garter surrounds the arms of the bishop in recognition of his service to James II in The Battle of Sedgemoor.

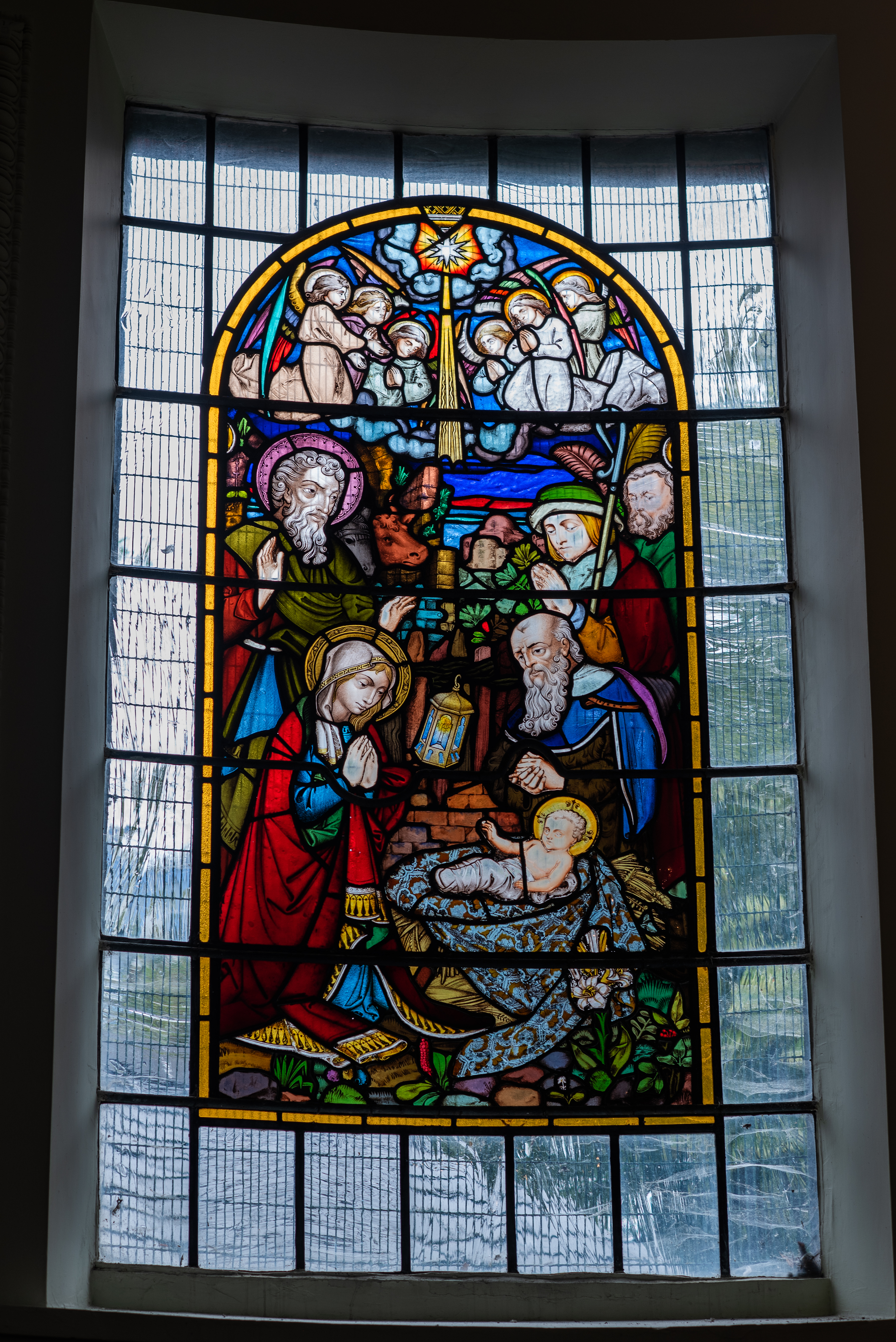
The Adoration of the Christ Child

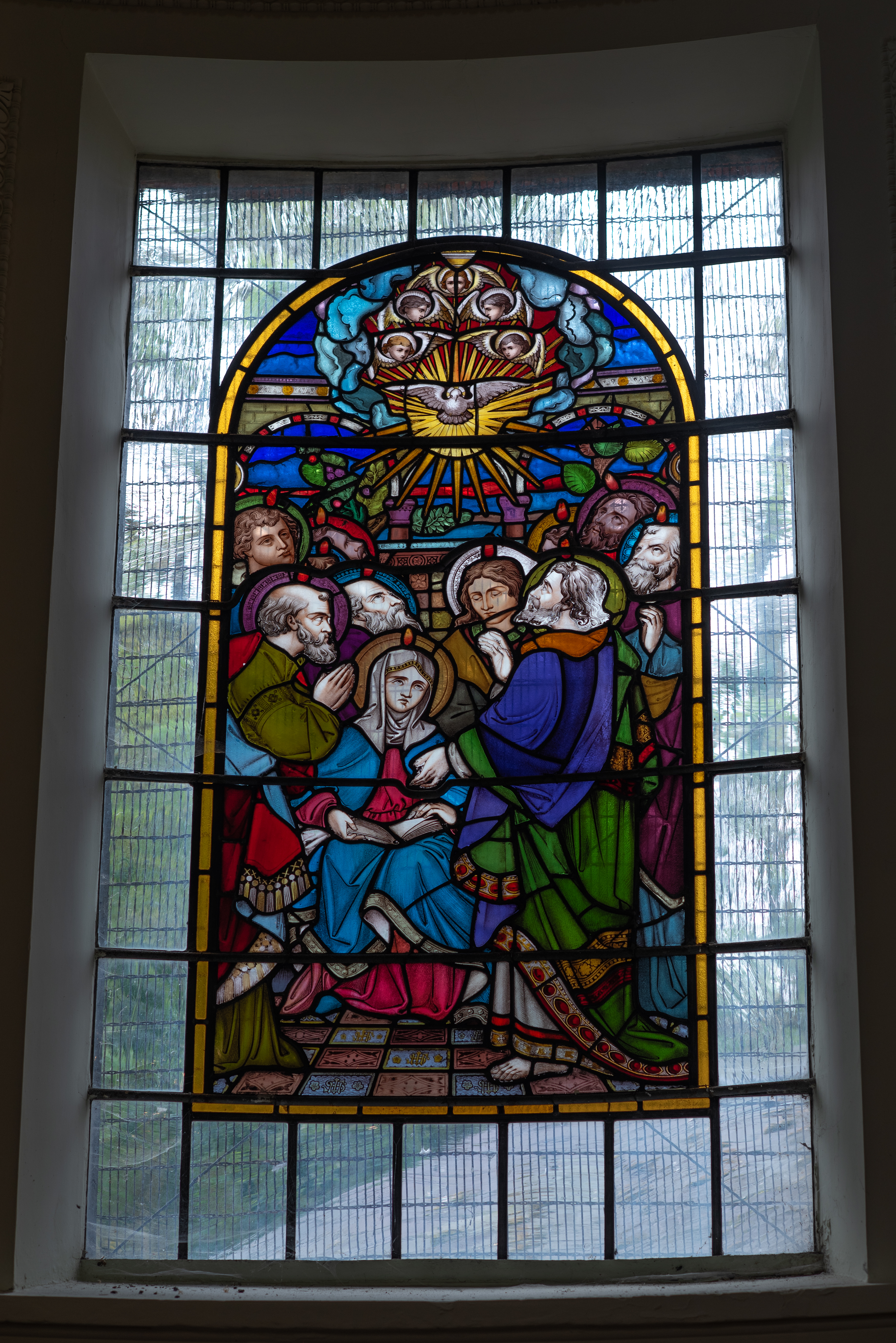
The Adoration of the Shepherds

=== Stained glass windows ===
Holy Trinity has three stained-glass windows situated in the apse, only two of which are visible today: the Adoration of the Shepherds and the Adoration of the Christ Child.

The centre window, which showed the Holy Trinity, is still in place, but has been obscured by the reredos, and the window has been bricked over outside.

The age of the windows is unknown, but they are referred to in ‘Historic Sketches of Gosport’, by Arthur Walford, from 1887.

The rest of the church's windows were coloured, to a design still visible in the side-windows just inside the main entrance, until 1959 when they were replaced with clear glass to allow more light into the building.

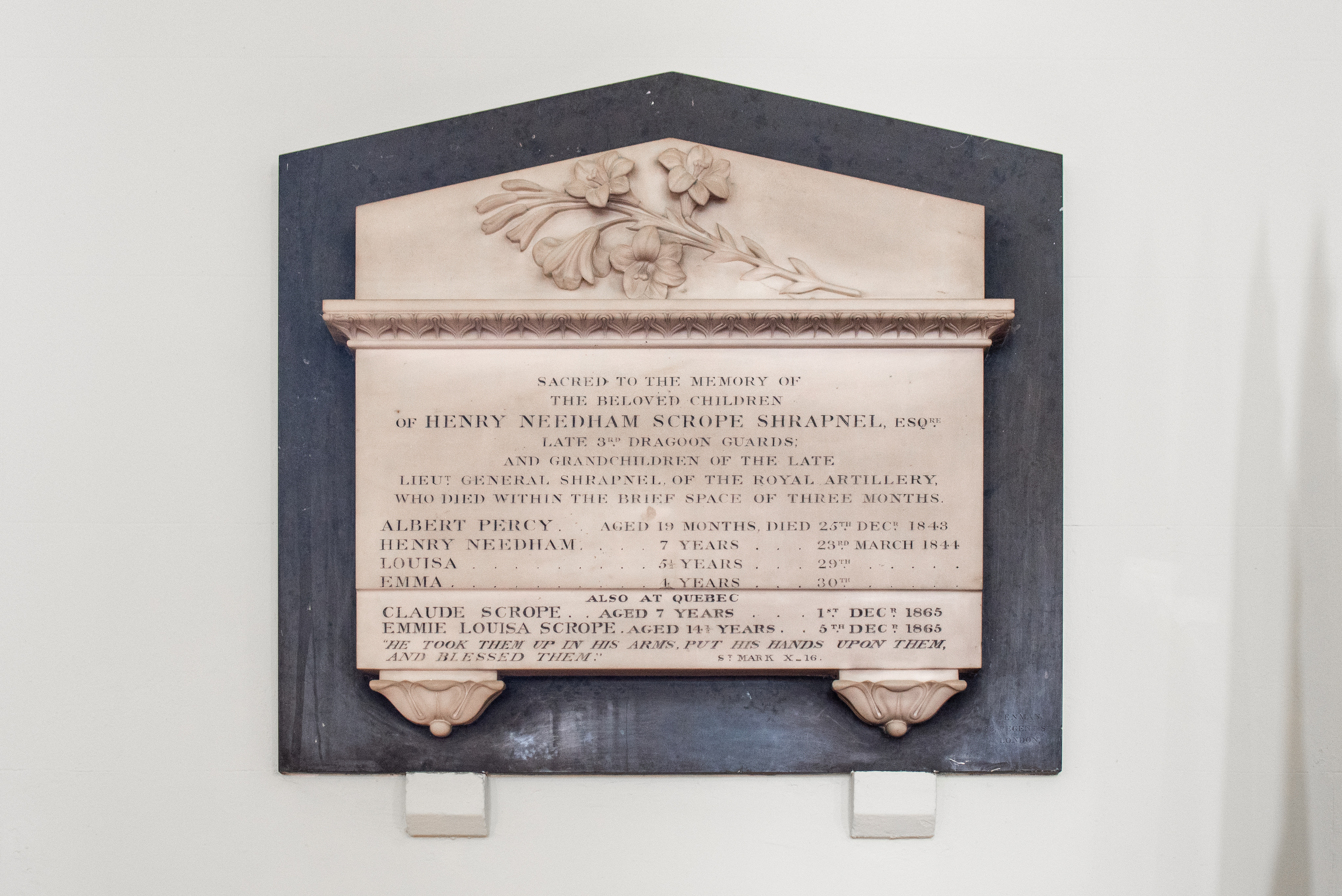
Memorial plaque to six of the children of Henry Needham Scrope Shrapnel, from 1844

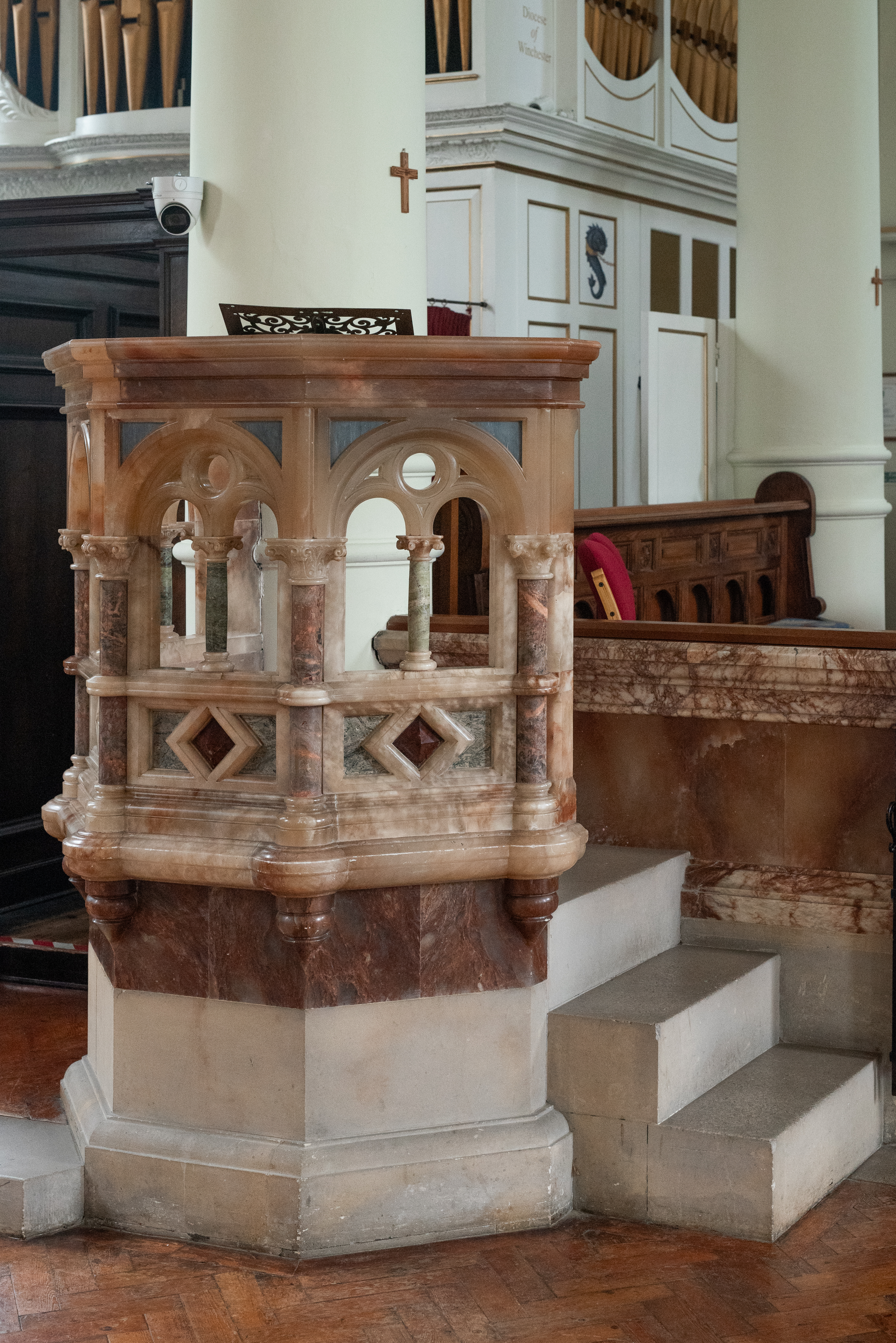
Pulpit designed by Arthur Blomfield and executed by Thomas Earp.

=== Memorial plaque to Shrapnel children ===
There are a number of interesting memorial plaques in the church. Of particular interest, on the north side of the church, is a memorial to the six children of Henry Needham Scrope Shrapnel, four of whom died within the space of three months.

It reads*:

'Sacred to the memory of the beloved children of Henry Needham Scrope Shrapnel, Esqre. Late 3rd Dragoon Guards, and grandchildren of the late Lieut. General Shrapnel of the Royal Artillery, who died within the brief space of three months.

- Albert Percy: Aged 19 months, died 25th Decr. 1843
- Henry Needham: . . 7 years . . . . 23rd March 1844
- Louisa: . . . . . . . . . . 5½ years . . 29th . . . . .
- Emma: . . . . . . . . . . 4 years . . . . 30th . . . . .

Also at Quebec:

- Claude Scrope: Aged 7 years . . . 1st Decr. 1865
- Emmie Louisa Scrope: Aged 14½ years, 5th Decr. 1865

"He took them up in his arms, put His hands upon them, and blessed them." St Mark, X_16 '

*Punctuation and decapitalisation added for readability

Shrapnel worked as a barrack master in Ireland, Bermuda, Halifax and Montreal, and following his retirement in 1866, he emigrated to Canada. He pressed both Houses of Parliament, unsuccessfully, to reward his father, Henry Shrapnel – for his invention of the shrapnel shell.

=== Pulpit ===
The pulpit was designed by Arthur Blomfield and produced by Thomas Earp in an Italian Renaissance style.

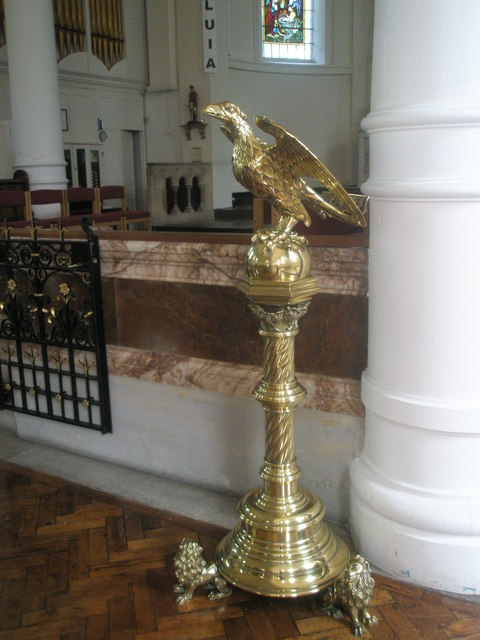
The lectern at Holy Trinity, presented to the church in 1887

=== Eagle lectern ===
The brass eagle lectern was presented to the church by colleagues, friends and family of Edward Lewis Lucy Shewell, the headmaster of the local Burney's Academy, following his death at sea, aged 56, on 5 May 1887 in a collision between two ships in the Mediterranean.

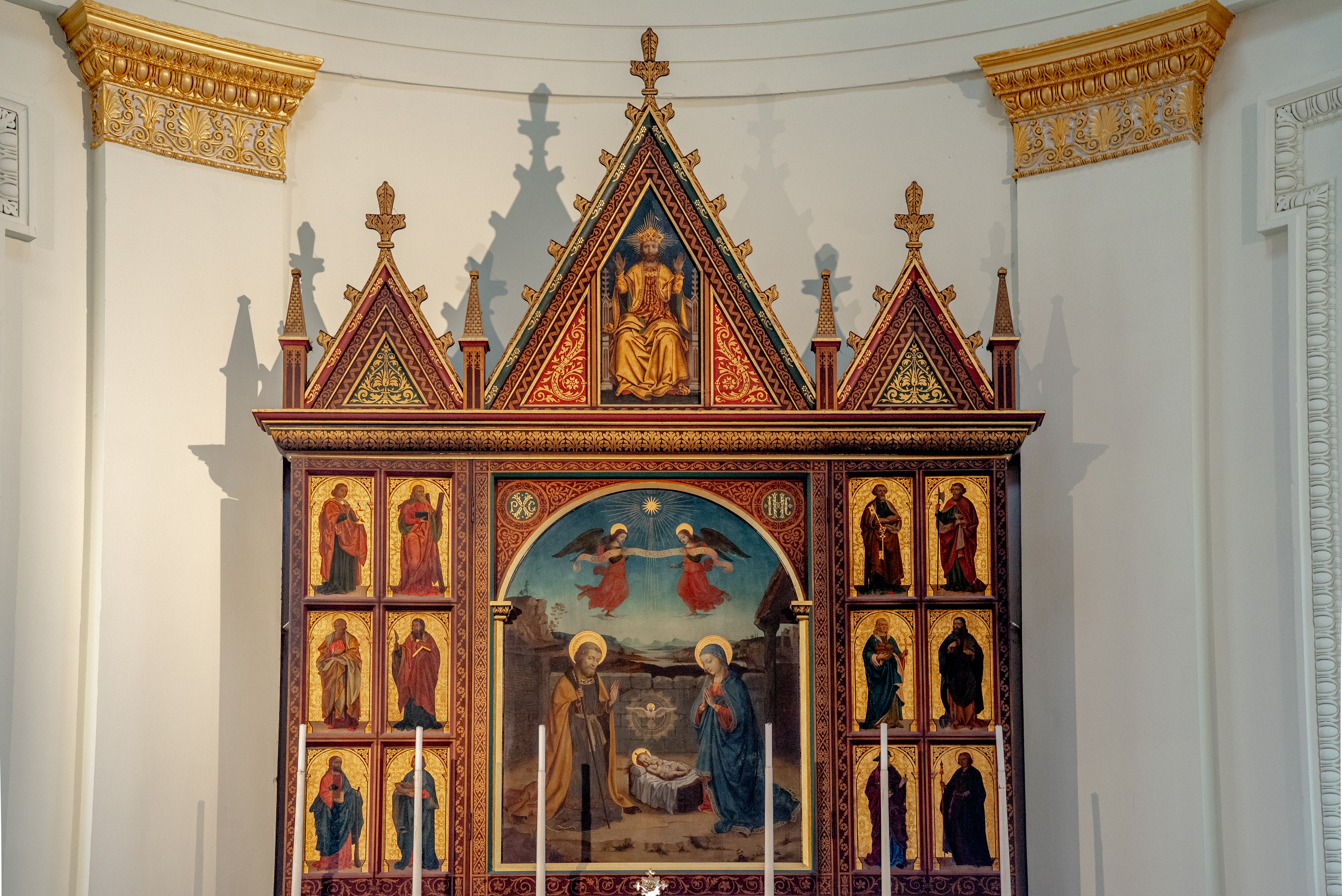
The reredos above the altar, installed in 1892

=== Reredos ===
The reredos above the altar contains an 18th-century painting of the nativity, by Charles Stephen Floyce, with the twelve apostles in the side panels. Little is known about Floyce except that he worked in collaboration with Charles Edgar Buckeridge. His nationality is unknown – he is described in some places as Florentine and in others as Flemish. He is believed to have painted the reredos around 1857–9.

The reredos was gifted to the church by local merchant, Edwin Bishop, in 1892, having brought it back from Italy with him. Edwin's gift to the church is commemorated on a brass plaque on the south wall of the church at the entrance to the nave. The reredos was restored in 2000 by Ambrose Scott-Moncrieff.

=== Lady Chapel ===
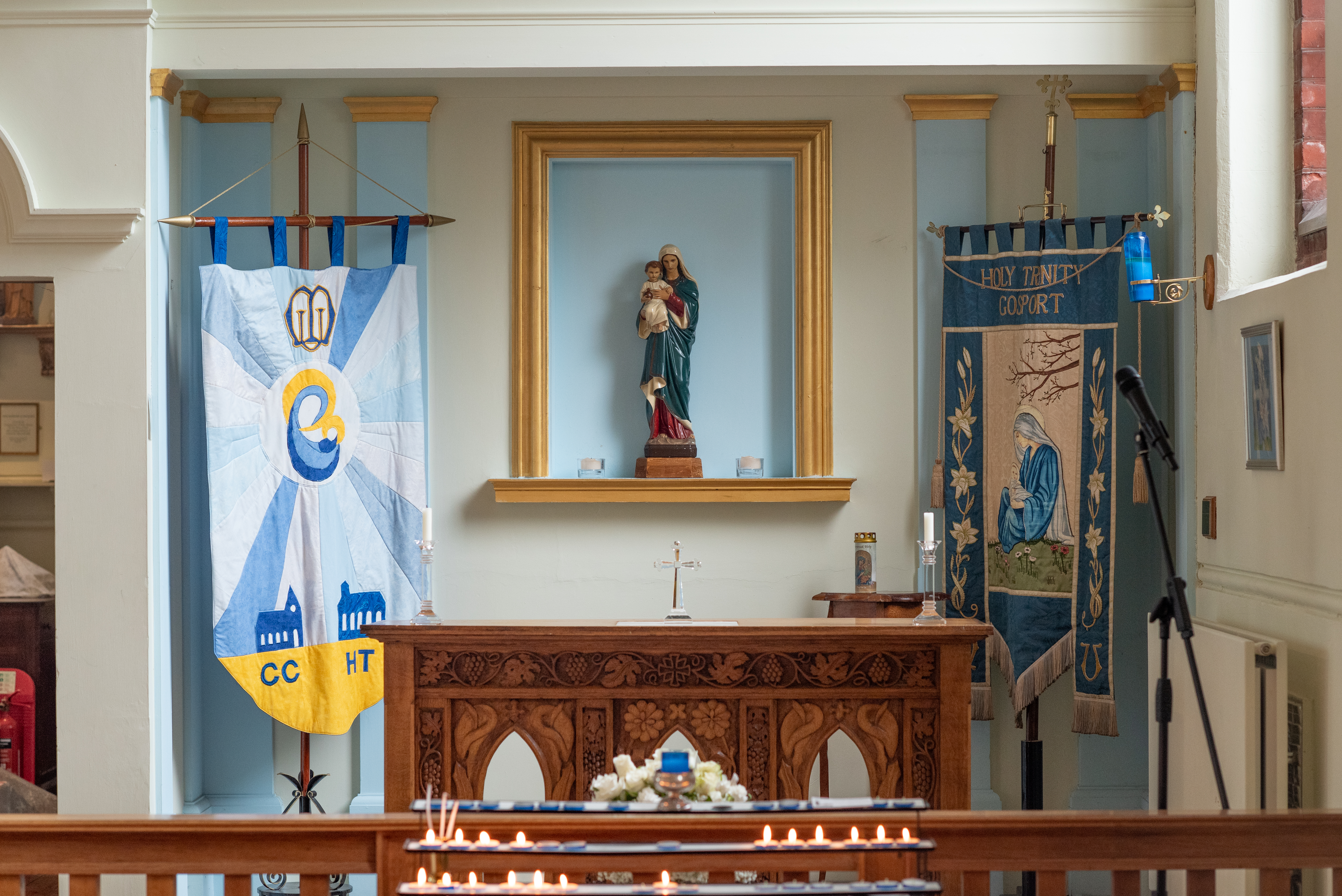
The lady chapel on the south side of the church, built in 1928.

The Lady Chapel on the south side of the church was built in 1928, and a choir vestry installed at the same time. The chapel was originally decorated in black and white with a scarlet soffit about the pilasters. The chapel is now dedicated to the memory of Canon Barclay (Priest from 1935 to 1967).

The altar is made of oak and features carvings of lilies, which are often used to symbolise the Virgin Mary.

The Madonna and Child statue was commissioned during the incumbency of Rev McWatter and is unique, as the mould was destroyed after it was made.

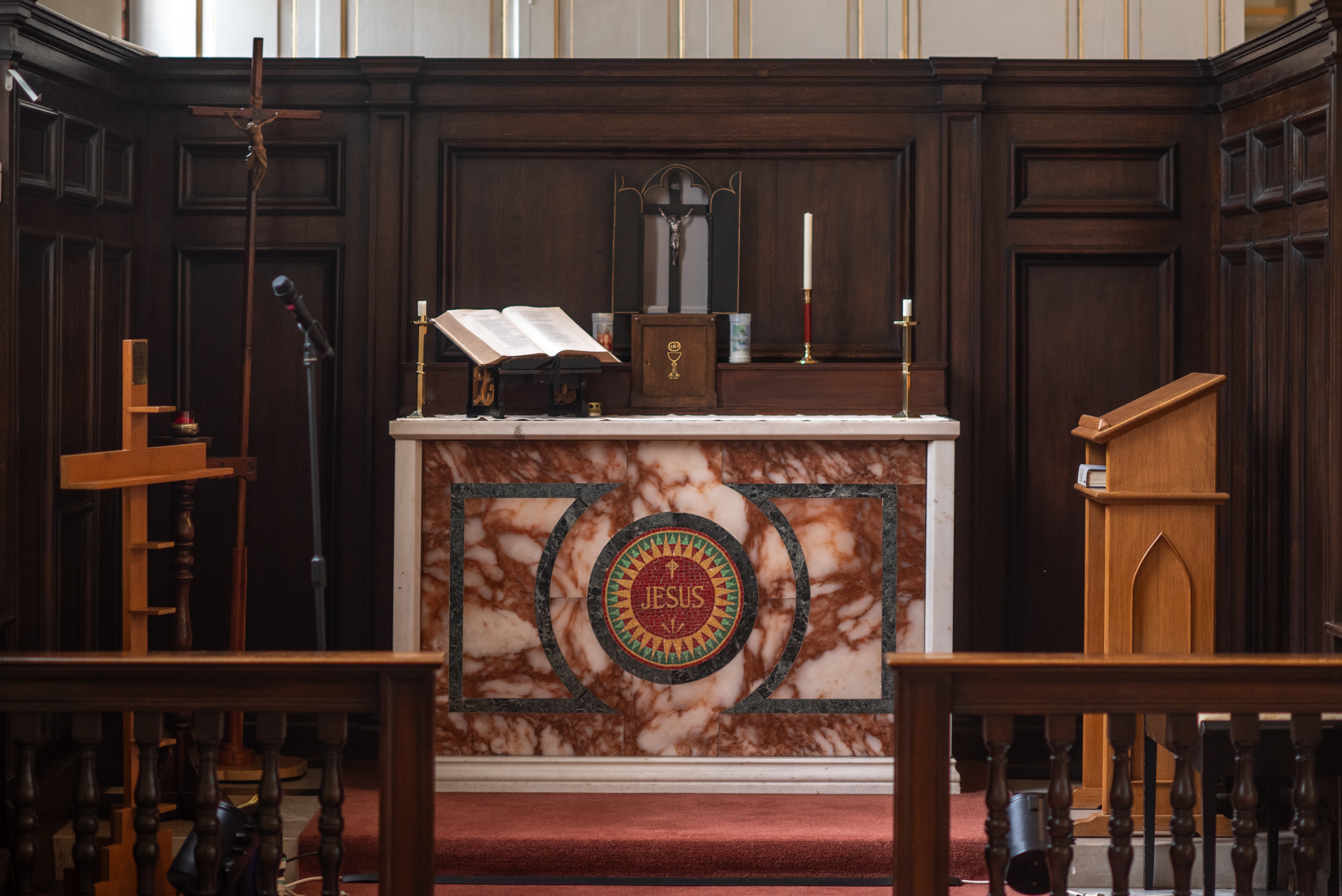
The Jesus Chapel, installed and dedicated in 1926

=== Jesus Chapel ===
The chapel on the north side of the church was dedicated in 1926, when it received its oak panelling and marble floor at a cost of £450.

The marble altar was presented to the church by Rev Woolsey's sister, Frances, in 1931.

The wooden figure of Christ in this chapel was given to the church in the 1930s in memory of the members of the Woolsey family who had served and attended the church. It was carved by Hems of Exeter.

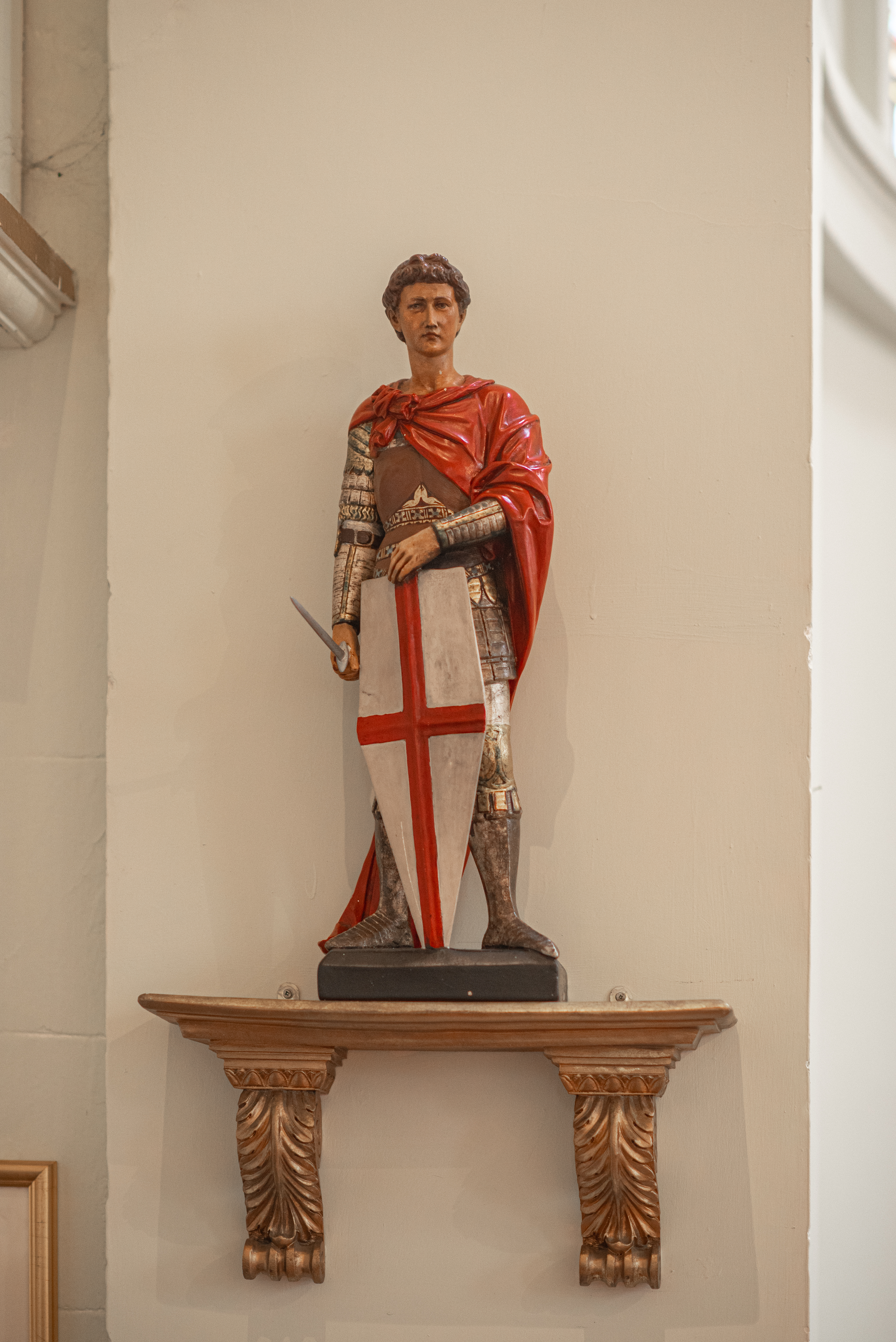
Statue of St George, gifted to the church in around 1944.

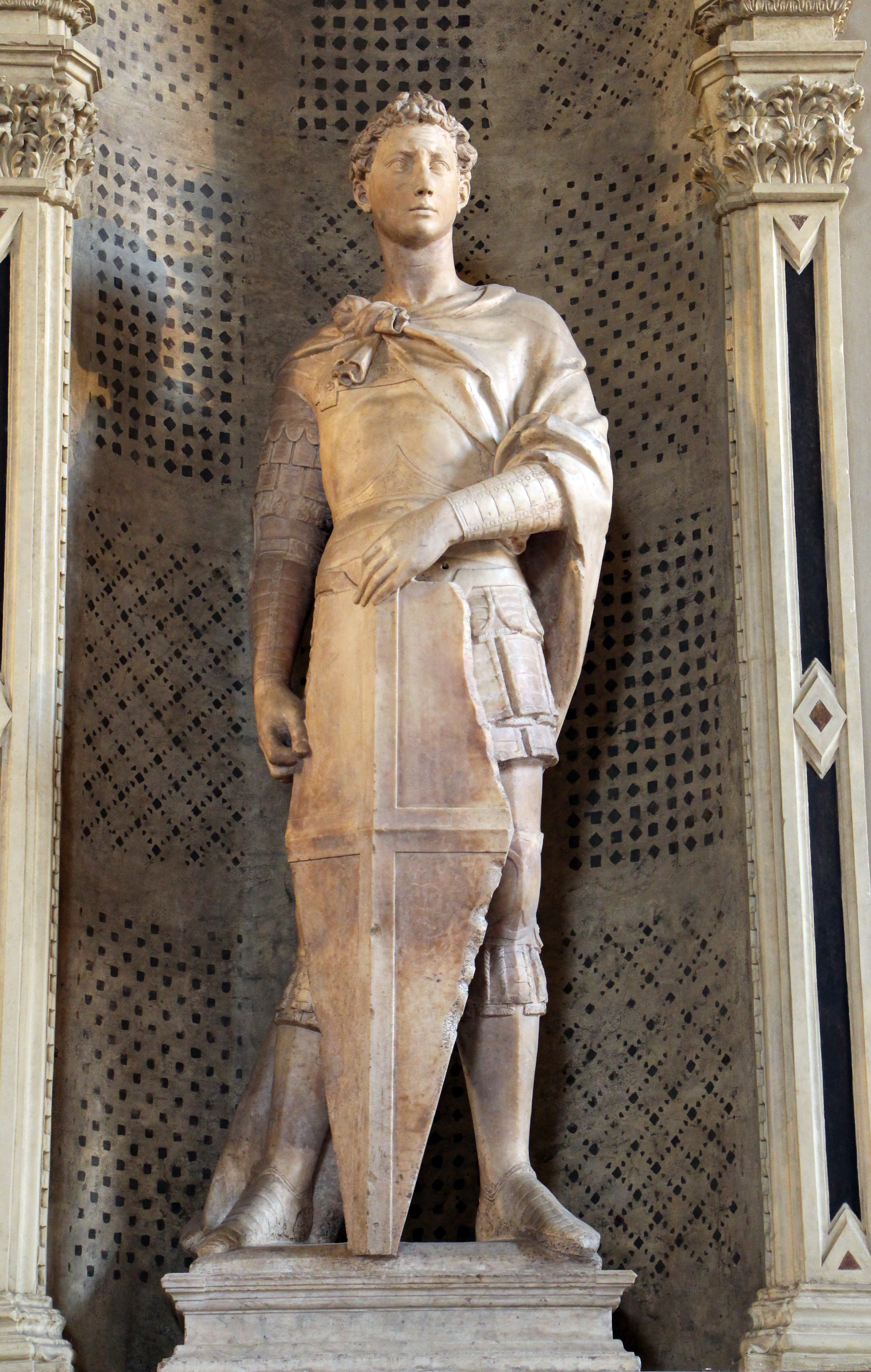
Donatello's San Giorgio at Museo Nazionale del Bargello, sculpted around 1416–17.

=== Statue of St George ===
A statue of Saint George was given to the church in about 1944 by parishioner, Ruby Pope, and family, in memory of her brothers, Alfred and John Hindry, who had died in World War II.

It is a plaster copy of an Italian Renaissance sculpture by Donatello – see: Saint George (Donatello), which stood in a series of niches for patron saints on the exterior of the Orsanmichele in Florence, and now lives at Museo Nazionale del Bargello.

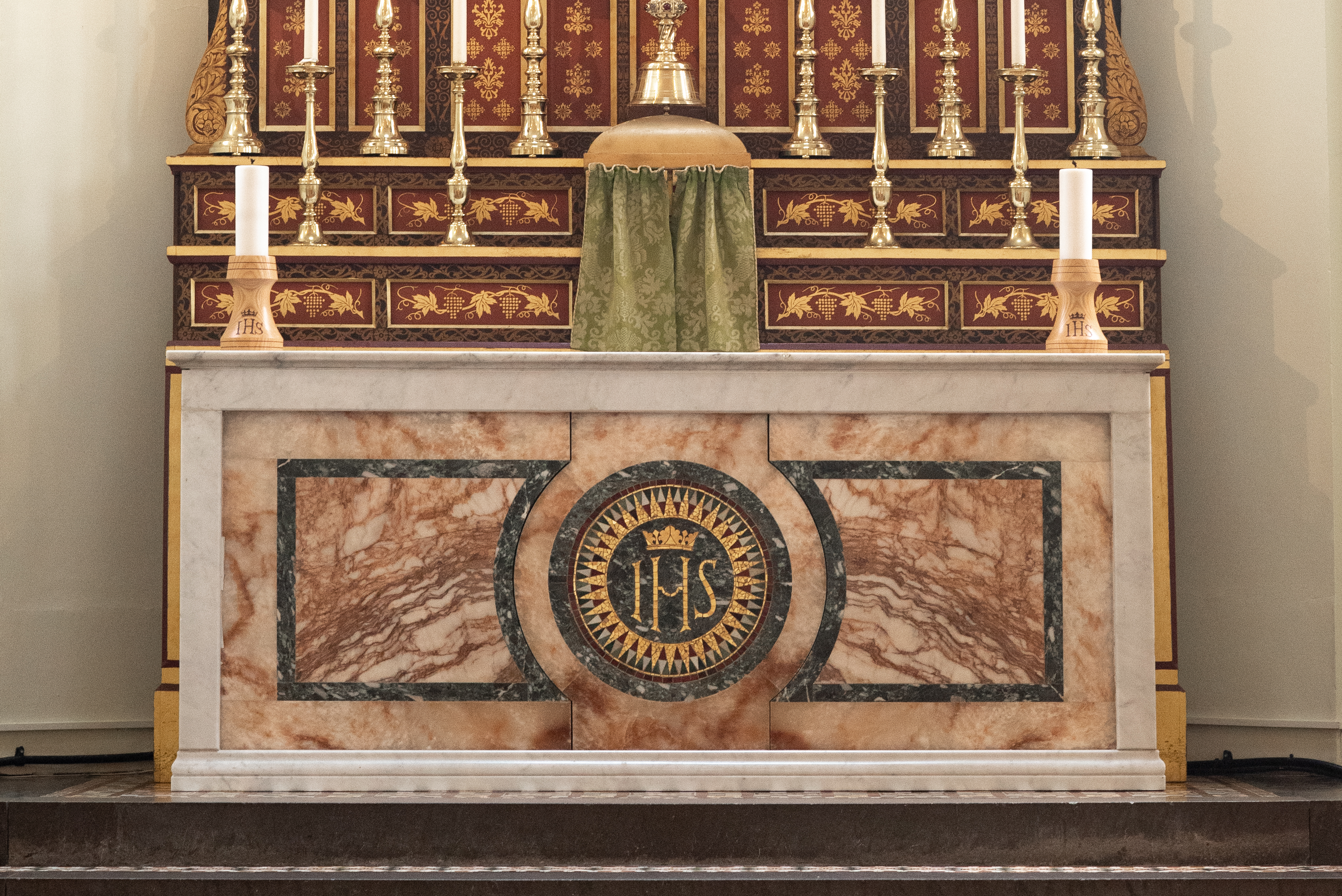
The marble high altar, brought to the church from St Agatha's in 1955.

=== High Altar ===
Holy Trinity's marble high altar was originally at the church of St Agatha's, Landport, in an area of Portsmouth which its founding priest-in-charge, Robert William Radclyffe Dolling, described as a "slum" in need of a magnificent and impressive church. The building of St Agatha's began in 1894 and it was consecrated four years later. St Agatha's quickly became an institution and a symbol of the Anglo-catholic faith in the Church of England, with all of its work centring on the altar. During WWII, much of the parish of St Agatha's was destroyed by bombs, and the church closed in 1954.

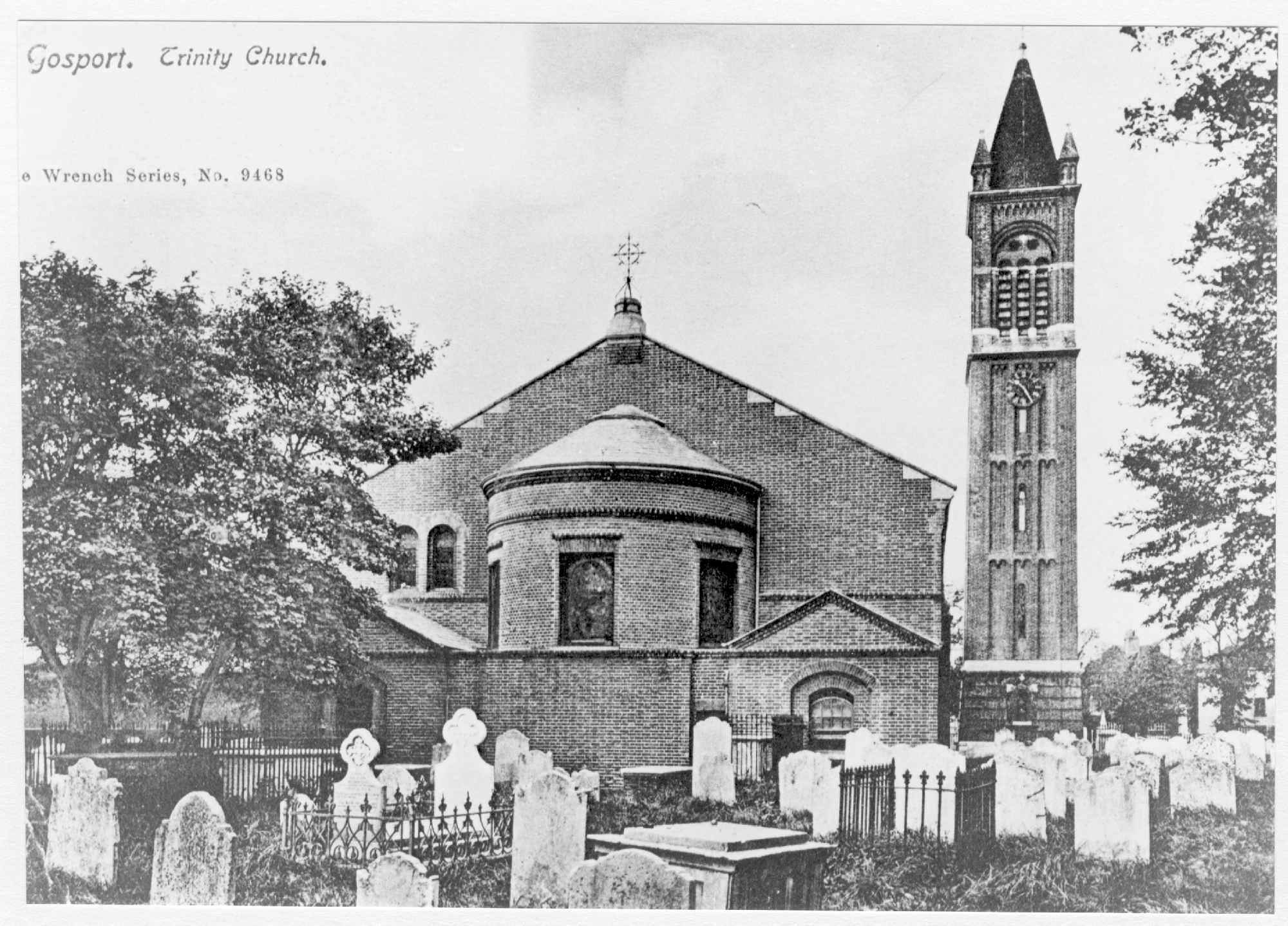
Holy Trinity's churchyard, circa 1904.

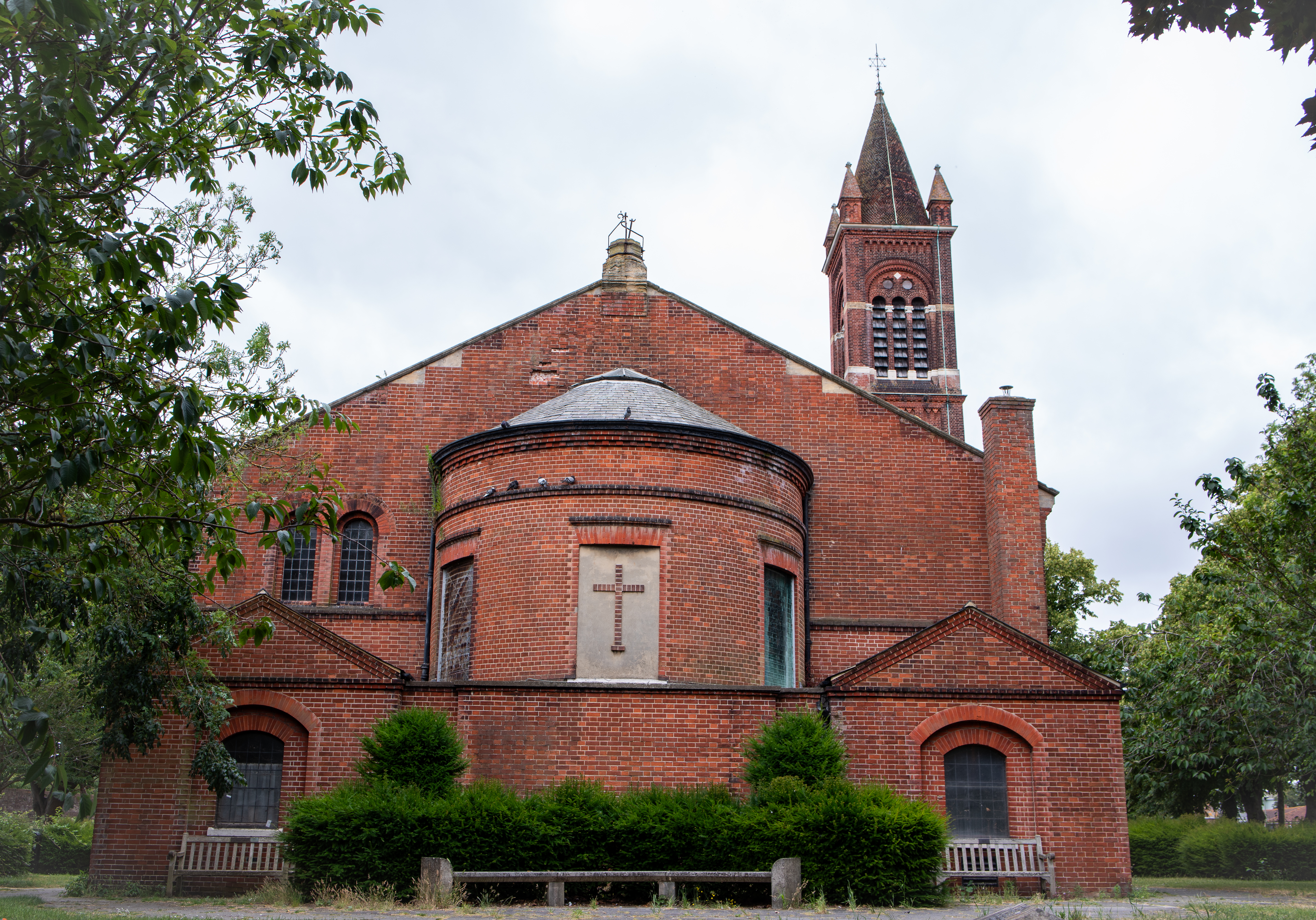
Holy Trinity's churchyard in 2024.

In 1955, after St Agatha's had been deconsecrated, Holy Trinity was given their altar as a gift. It was installed by Nigel Church, carpenter Frederick Riches and mason Alfred Newnham.

St Agatha's was returned to ecclesiastical use in 1994 as part of the Traditional Anglican Communion.

=== Graveyard ===
In 1962 the churchyard was cleared and levelled and 1,000 roses were planted with a wide expanse of green lawn, which became known as Trinity Green. The Bishop of Portsmouth, John Phillips, re-hallowed the ground after a service of thanksgiving.

One grave was left behind, the tomb of Revd Luke Nichols, who had paid for the campanile. His gravestone reads*:

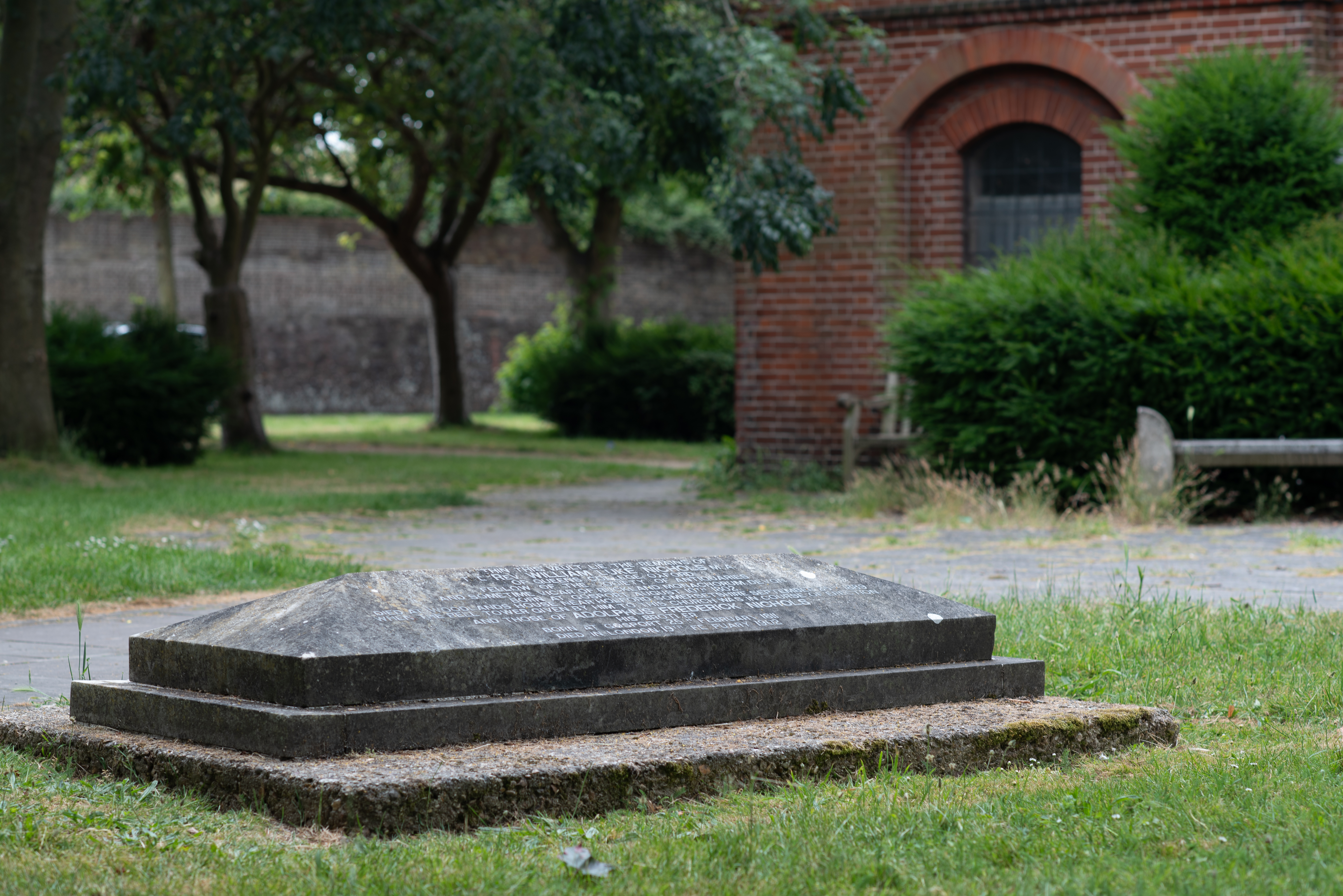
The grave of Rev William Luke Nichols and his brother, who died in 1889 and 1902 respectively, which remains following clearing of the graveyard in 1962

'Within this vault lie the remains of the Rev William Luke Nichols...

...M.A. of Queens College, Oxford, fellow of The Society of Antiquaries and sometimes Vicar of Buckland Monachorum, Devon. Born at Gosport, August 10th 1802. Died at Woodlands House, near Holford, Somersetshire, September 25th 1889, when the bell tower given by him to this church was in course of erection...

...and those of Dolphus Frederick Nichols, his brother, born at Gosport, 25th February 1811. Died in London, 19th February 1902.'

*Punctuation and decapitalisation added for readability

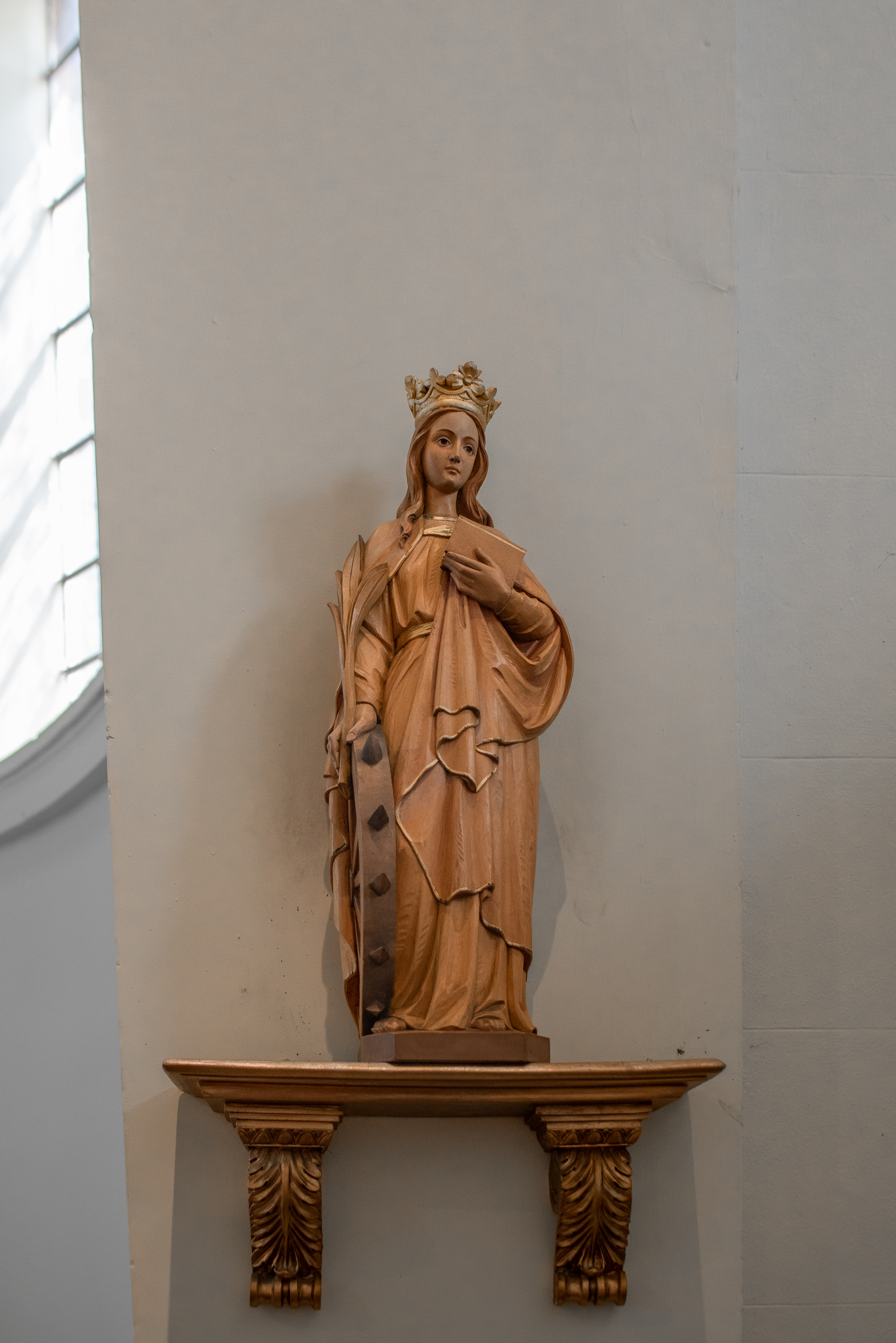
Wooden statue of Catherine of Alexandria, installed in 1965.

=== Statue of St Katherine ===
A wooden statue of Saint Katharine commemorates Catherine Barclay, the wife of Canon Barclay, who was vicar of Holy Trinity from 1935 to 1967. Catherine died in 1965.

The statue of Katharine shows her standing alongside a spike-studded wheel on which she is said to have been tortured. The figure was hand-carved in Italy.

== See also ==
- Anglican Diocese of Portsmouth
- Anglicanism
- Anglo-Catholicism
- Church of England
- Grade II* listed buildings in Gosport
- List of Anglo-Catholic churches in England
- List of places of worship in the Borough of Gosport
