= Ca d'Oro Building =

Building in Glasgow, Scotland

Coordinates: 55.8603°N 4.2566°W

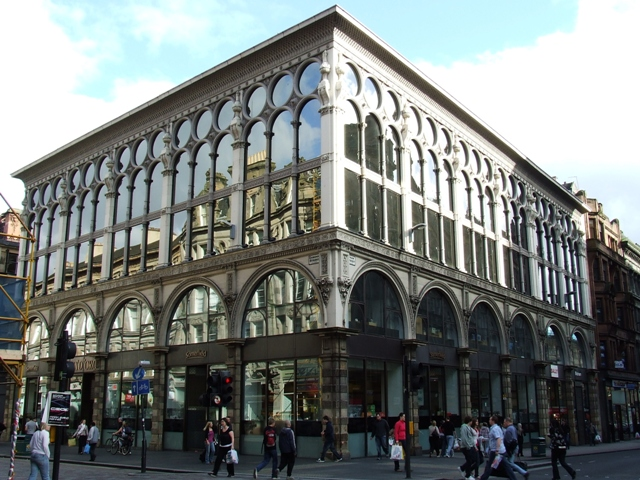
Ca d'Oro Building

The Ca d'Oro Building is a commercial building in the Scottish city of Glasgow. The building was made a Category B listed building in 1970 and was then upgraded to Category A in 1988 after being restored from a fire.

== History ==
The building was constructed in 1872 as F and J Smith's Furniture Warehouse at a cost of £11,000. The Scottish architect John Honeyman was responsible for the design. Between 1926 and 1929, the building was expanded and partially revised according to a design by Gillespie Kidd & Coia. A fire devastated the building in 1987. When it was rebuilt, the interior was replaced by an atrium surrounded by shops. The restoration has been recognized by the Scottish Civic Trust.

== Description ==
Inspired by the Ca' d'Oro in Venice, the Ca d'Oro Building is designed in the style of Venetian Renaissance architecture. Set on the corner between Union Street and Gordon Street in the centre of Glasgow, the building is just north of the Egyptian Halls, with Glasgow Central train station opposite across Union Street.

The facade along Gordon Street is five arches wide. The cascade along Union Street was originally only four arches wide but in the course of restoring the building after the 1987 fire the building was expanded, adding two arches. The shop front on the ground floor of the four-story building is modern. The pillars of the round-arch arcade are banded; the archivolts, like the gusset plates, are ornamented. A stylized triglyph frieze runs over the fighters. A frieze with a tooth cut runs over it. The two upper floors feature cast iron arcades. Pilasters structure the facade vertically. Round windows are embedded above. The final cornice is decorated with a cross diamond frieze.
