= St Silas Church, Glasgow =

Church in Glasgow

Coordinates: 55°52′20″N 4°16′48″W

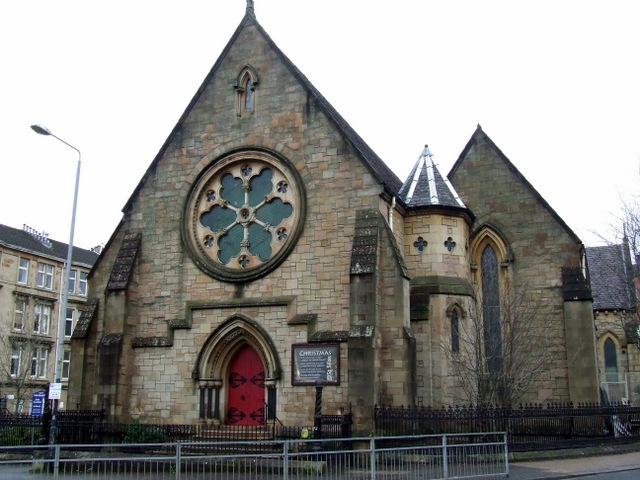
St Silas Church, Glasgow

St Silas Church is an evangelical Anglican church in the Woodlands area of Glasgow, Scotland, adjacent to Kelvingrove Park and the University of Glasgow. The congregation was founded in 1864 and holds to the theology of the Thirty-nine Articles in the 1662 Book of Common Prayer. The church is a category B listed building.

== History ==
The church was founded as an Anglican chapel in Scotland in 1864, due to concerns about the Oxford Movement's sway on the Scottish Episcopal Church. Despite this, it remained independent from the denomination. It became the last of 11 Anglican churches, at their height, to join The Scottish Episcopal Church in 1982. The church then left the denomination in 2019, following their perception that the denomination had departed from the authoritative teachings of the Bible. Following this decision, the Church joined the Anglican Convocation in Europe (ACE), a diocese of the Anglican Network in Europe (ANiE).

During the ministry of J.C. Ryle as bishop of Liverpool, he was also the bishop for St Silas, where he regularly preached at least once a year.

== Activities ==
In addition to the regular Sunday services, a traditional 1662 Book of Common Prayer service is conducted on the first Sunday of every month, which uses the morning prayer liturgy of the Daily Office (Anglican).

== The building ==
The land was bought by Archibald Campbell (the father of Archibald Campbell, 1st Baron Blythswood), George Burns and William Burnley, and the building was designed by John Honeyman (architect), who later worked alongside Charles Rennie Mackintosh. Minor alterations were made in 1907-08 during the time that Mackintosh worked with Honeyman. Sculptor Thomas Earp contributed carved stonework to the building project.

The building is listed as a 'Category B' listed building by Historic Environment Scotland, with a noted special interest in its ecclesiastical nature, the memorial to World War One and World War Two, and the memorial to Archibald Campbell of Blythswood. Also mentioned is the quatrefoil pulpit, stained glass windows from the 1880s, and a golden brass eagle lectern from 1887.

An extension was added to the building in 2005 by Wellwood Leslie Architects, comprising a contemporary church hall, meeting rooms and office space over two levels.

=== Memorials ===
On the north west wall sits a mural memorial to Archibald Campbell of Blythswood, which reads: "In memory of Archibald Campbell of Blythswood, who gave the site on which this church is built and freed it of feu duty, also contributed largely to its erection in order to provide a place of worship for all time, where the services of the Church of England might be conducted in their simple and Protestant form and the gospel of the grace of God be preached. A.D. 1864. This tablet was placed here by his son Sholto D. Campbell Douglas A.D. 1904. Sometime incumbent A.D. 1886-1899 who afterwards became Lord Blythswood and died September 30th 1916 leaving £10,000 for the augmentation of the Ministers Stipend upon the terms set forth in the Vestry."

The St Silas' Episcopal Mission in Partick ran from 1886 to 1952 and was also designed by John Honeyman. On its closure, four tablets were moved into the Park Road building. These tablets range from 1875 to 1935, and are in remembrance of people who dedicated their lives to the Mission.

== Partners ==
Denominationally, the Church is a member of the Anglican Network in Europe and the Global Anglican Futures Conference (GAFCON). Additionally, St Silas partners with the John Paton Foundation (named after the Scottish missionary John Paton).
