= The Tron Church at Kelvingrove =

Tron Church
- The Tron Church at Kelvingrove
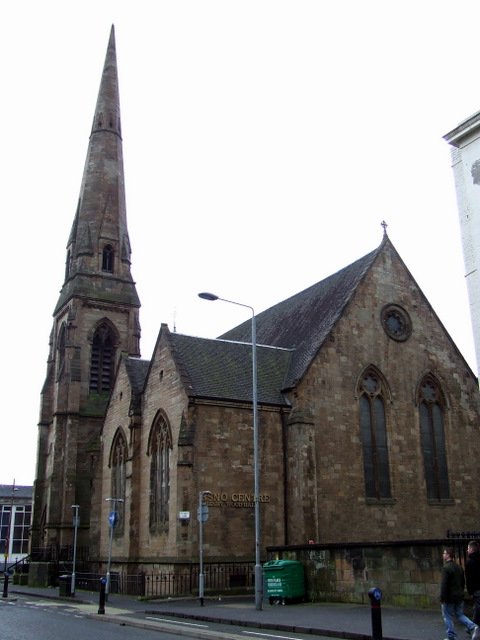
- Tron Church
- 55°51′55″N 4°16′49″W
- Location: Glasgow
- Country: Scotland
- Denomination: Didasko (Presbyterian)
- Previous denomination: Congregational church
- Churchmanship: Evangelical
- Website: Church website

History
- Former name(s): Trinity Congregational Church; Henry Wood Hall
- Status: Active

Architecture
- Functional status: Church
- Architect: John Honeyman
- Architectural type: Church
- Style: Neo-Gothic
- Groundbreaking: 1864

Specifications
- Materials: Coursed Ashlar

Listed Building – Category B
- Designated: 15 December 1970
- Reference no.: LB33010

The Tron Church at Kelvingrove is a 19th-century church located in the Kelvingrove neighbourhood in the West End of Glasgow, and formerly known as Henry Wood Hall when it was the home of the Royal Scottish National Orchestra from 1979–2012. Originally the home of a Congregational church, the building is now home to the congregation of The Tron Church, an evangelical presbyterian church meeting in three locations across Glasgow.

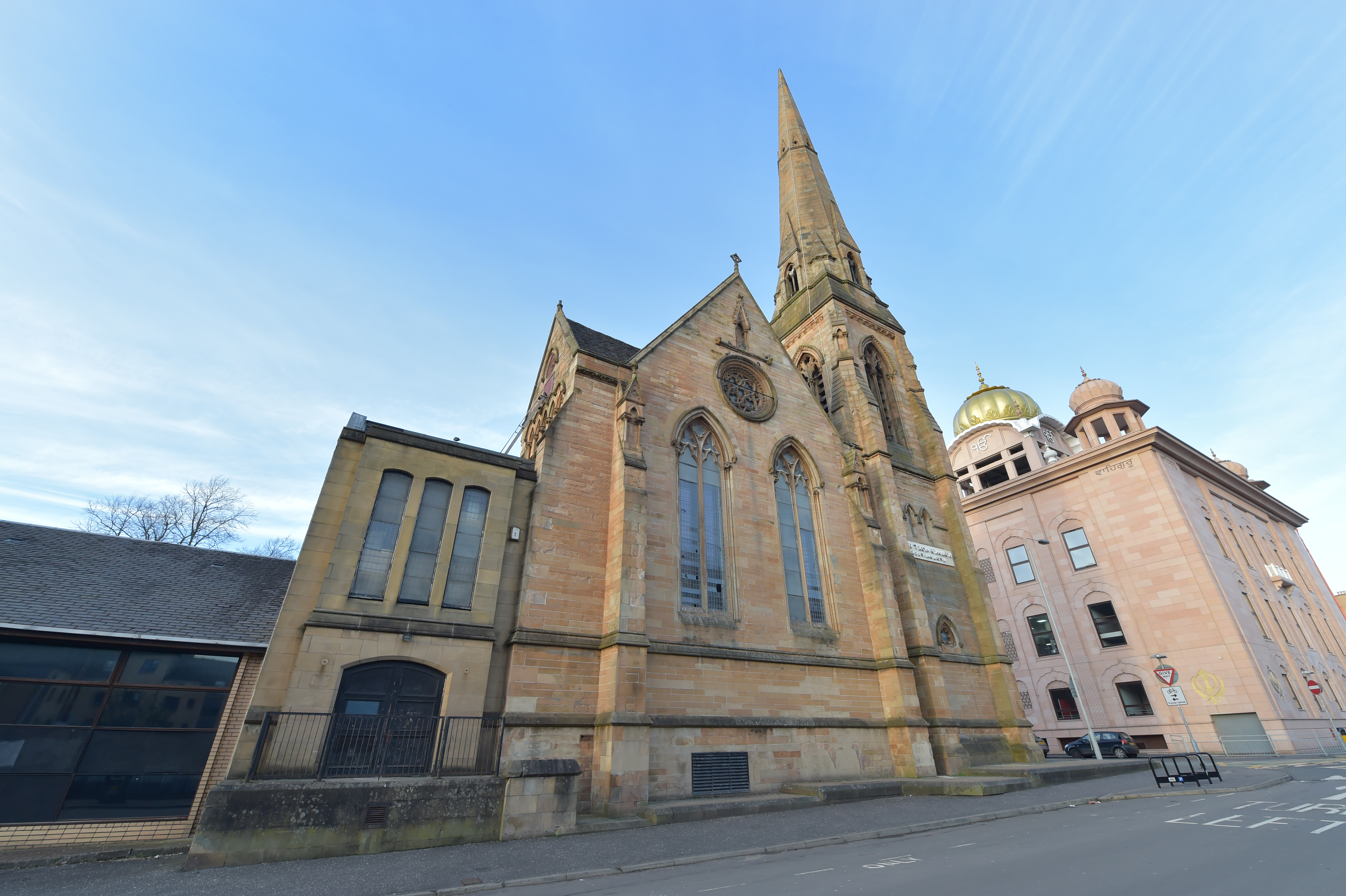

== History ==
The building was founded as the Trinity Congregational Church. Originally designed by John Honeyman and completed in 1864, it is a distinctive feature on the landscape with its Gothic Revival spire.

=== Former Henry Wood Hall ===
The Scottish National Orchester (SNO) had originally played in Glasgow's St Andrew's Hall, until that building was destroyed by fire in 1962. The orchestra then played in a series of venues of varying suitability.

In 1979, the redesign of the Trinity Church in Claremont Street gave the SNO a permanent home of its own: the SNO Centre. A later extension added the Sir Henry Wood Hall to fabric of the existing church building.

This building – SNO Centre and the Sir Henry Wood Hall – was the main base, rehearsal and recording studio for the SNO for over thirty years. In 1991, the SNO gained Royal patronage and was re-named as the Royal Scottish National Orchestra (RSNO), Scotland's national symphony orchestra.

In 2015 the RSNO moved to a purpose-built extension at the Glasgow Royal Concert Hall in November 2015, although Henry Wood Hall had been put up for sale in mid-2012.

== The Tron at Kelvingrove ==
After the RSNO moved out of Henry Wood Hall, the congregation of The Tron Church at Bath Street (previously based in Buchanan Street before the congregation departed following disagreement with the Church of Scotland on the authority of the Bible, particularly as pertaining to attitudes towards same-sex marriages among members of the clergy in 2012) purchased the building and put it back into use as a place of worship. It is now called Tron Kelvingrove. It is a congregation within the Didasko presbytery, a new denomination in Scotland, largely composed of former Church of Scotland congregations.
