= John Honeyman (architect) =

Scottish architect (1831–1914)

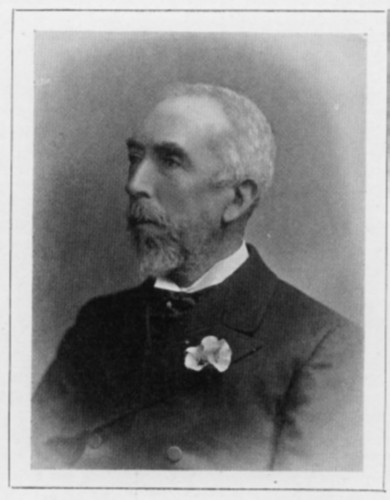
- Honeyman, pictured around 1900
- Born: 11 August 1831; Glasgow, Scotland
- Died: 8 January 1914 (aged 82); Bridge of Allan, Stirling
- Occupation: Architect
- Awards: FRIBA
- Practice: Honeyman and Keppie

John Honeyman (11 August 1831 – 8 January 1914) was a Scottish architect. He designed several notable buildings in Scotland, mostly churches, and worked alongside Charles Rennie Mackintosh as a partner for several years.

== Early life ==
John Honeyman was born at 21 Carlton Place, Glasgow, in 1831, the third son of John Honeyman JP and Isabella Smith. Honeyman was educated at home and then at Merchiston Castle School in Edinburgh from 1841 to 1846. He then he studied at Glasgow University with the intention of entering the Church. He decided against becoming a minister and spent a year in a London accountant's office. After his return to Glasgow, he was apprenticed to the minor Glasgow architect Alexander Munro.

== Career ==
Honeyman was admitted as a Fellow of the Royal Institute of British Architects (FRIBA) in 1874. He designed three schools for The School Board of Glasgow: Rockvilla Street School, Tureen Street School and Henderson Street School.

After falling into financial difficulties by 1888, 26-year-old John Keppie refinanced and effectively re-founded Honeyman's practice as Honeyman and Keppie.

By 1890, Honeyman was experiencing problems with his eyesight, which limited his actual design to church work and restorations.

As the practice recovered, his reputation also grew. He was elected an Associate of the Royal Scottish Academy (ARSA) in 1892, and elevated to full academician three years later.

He retired officially on 1 January 1901, allowing Keppie and Charles Rennie Mackintosh, who had become lead designer in the practice in 1892, to buy him out by his taking a half share of the profits over the next three years.

The University of Glasgow conferred a Legum Doctor on him in 1904.

=== Notable works ===
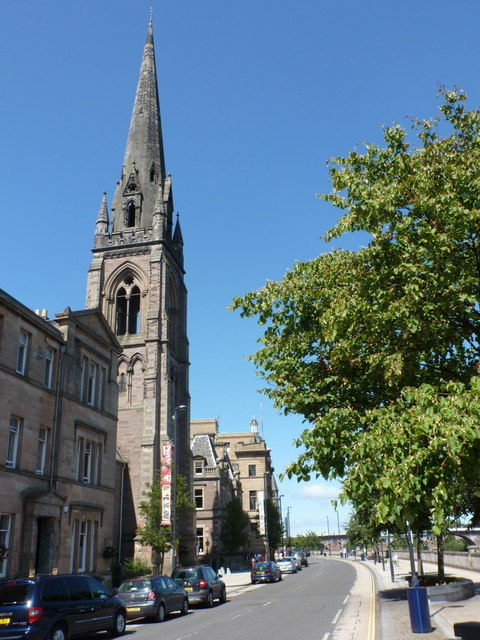
Perth Free Church (now St Matthew's)

- Moffat Free Church (1849; new spire)
- Wynd Free Church (1853)
- James Drew Monument (1856)
- St Thomas's Church, Greenock (1856)
- Craigton House (1861)
- Free West Church, Greenock (1861)
- Govan Free Church (1861; addition)
- Maryhill Parish Church (1861; pulpit)
- Lansdowne Parish Church, Glasgow (1862)
- Dumbarton Free Church (1863)
- Trinity Congregational Church, Glasgow (1863)
- St Silas Church, Glasgow
- Perth Free Church (now St Matthew's) (1869)
- Ca d'Oro Building (1872)
- Glasgow Evangelical Church (1878)
- St Michael's Church, Edinburgh (1883)
- Fairfield Shipbuilding Company Offices, Glasgow (1889)

== Personal life ==
Honeyman married Rothesia Chalmers Ann Hutchison in Partick on 3 June 1863. She died less than a year later after giving birth to John Rothes Charles Honeyman.

He married a second time, to Falconer Margaret Kemp. The ceremony took place in London. They had two sons: William Frederick Colquhoun (1868–1885) and George Michael Allan (1872–1888).

Falconer died in 1881, and Honeyman married for a third time, to Sarah Anne Horne, three years later. They had a son, Herbert Lewis Honeyman, in 1885. Earlier that year, William died at sea. George died "somewhere abroad" in 1888. That same year, Honeyman had little to no business.

== Death ==
Honeyman died of pneumonia in 1914, aged 82. He was buried with his first two wives at Glasgow Necropolis in an unmarked grave at the base of the rockface in the Upsilon section of the cemetery, between two monuments to the Tennent family, facing the Wellpark Brewery.
