= Letham, Perth and Kinross =

Area of Perth, Scotland

Coordinates: 56.400964°N 3.475795°W

Letham
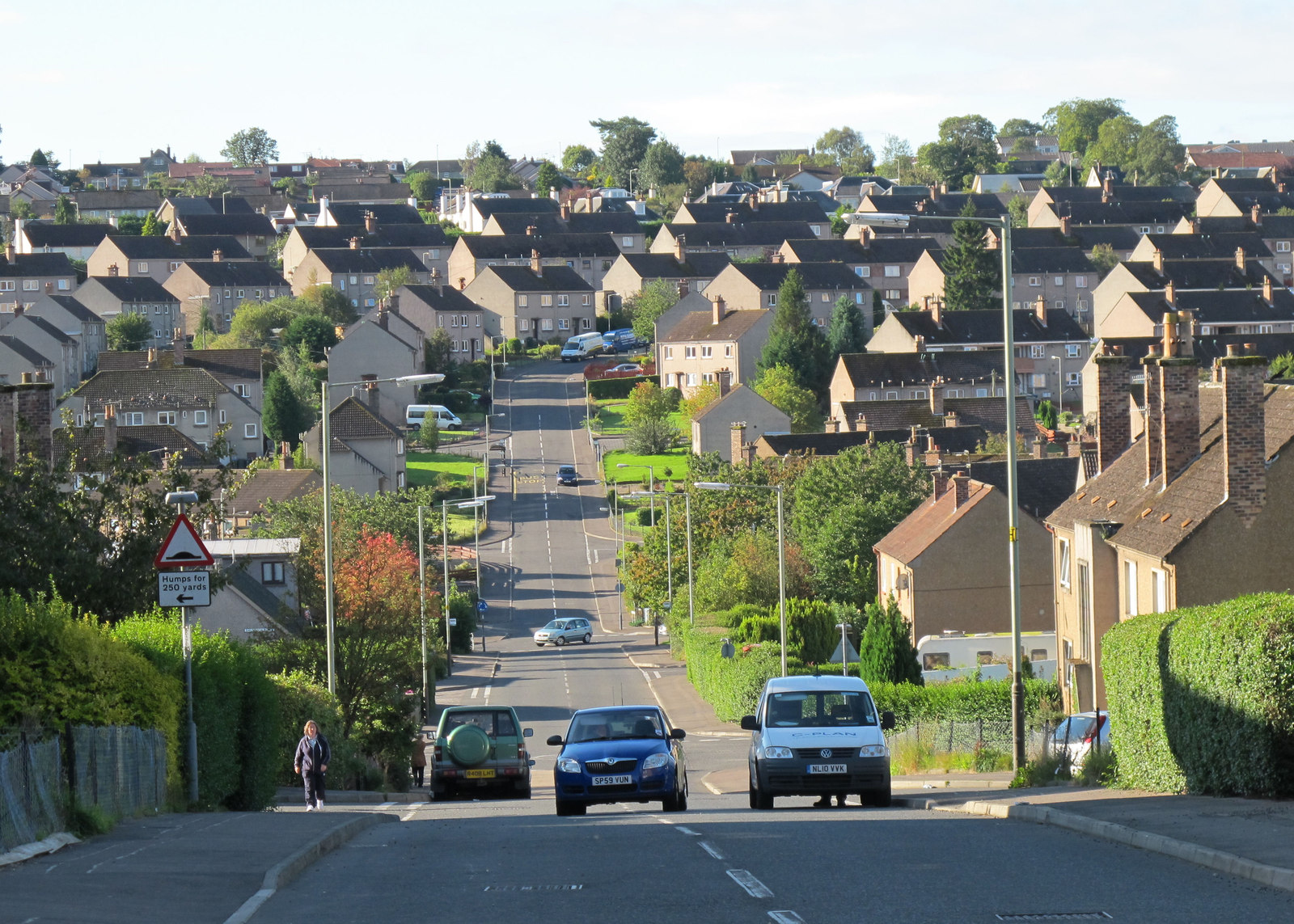
- Campsie Road in Letham, looking south

- Location within Perth and Kinross
- Council area: Perth and Kinross
- Lieutenancy area: Perth and Kinross
- Country: Scotland
- Sovereign state: United Kingdom
- Post town: PERTH
- Postcode district: PH1
- Dialling code: 01738
- Police: Scotland
- Fire: Scottish
- Ambulance: Scottish
- UK Parliament: Perth and Kinross-shire
- Scottish Parliament: Perthshire South and Kinross-shire

Letham is a suburban area of Perth, in the council area of Perth and Kinross, Scotland, approximately 2.0 miles (3.2 km) west-northwest of the centre of Perth. It borders Tulloch, which is located to the north and northeast. Newhouse Road separates Letham from Hillyland to the west.

Letham lies a short distance east of the A9 and south of the A85 (Crieff Road). The adjacent Hillyland is centred on a hill, which is 55.8 metres (183 ft) at its highest point.

== Notable people ==
Journalist and broadcaster Stuart Cosgrove was born in Letham in 1952 and spent his childhood there.

== Sport ==
Football club Letham F.C., established in 1960, is based at Seven Acres Pavilion on Newhouse Road in Letham.

== Public transport ==
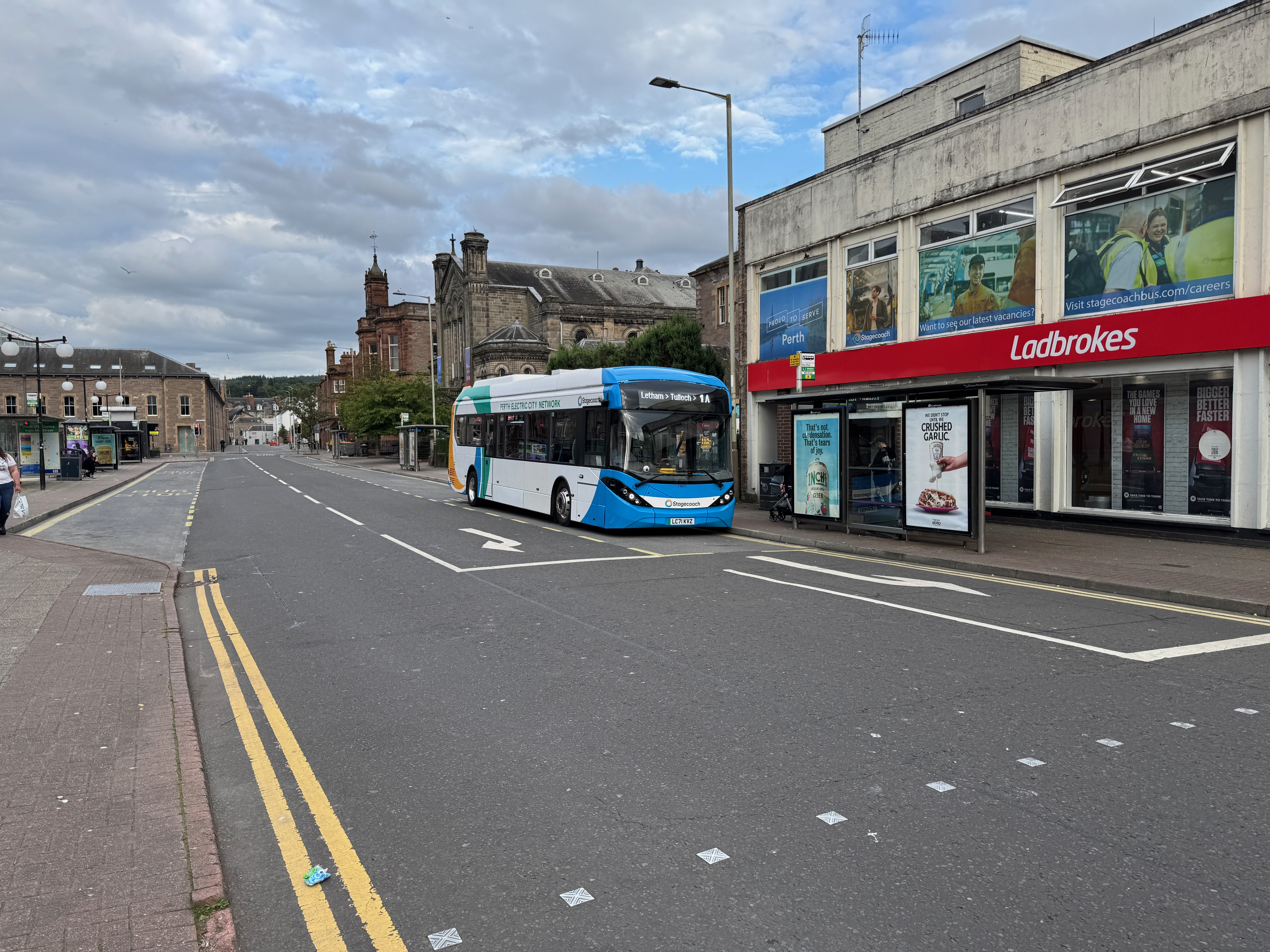
Stagecoach's route 1A, which serves Letham, on Mill Street in Perth (2024)

Stagecoach South Scotland's route 1 loops between the Mill Street exchange in the city centre, Perth Royal Infirmary, Letham and Tulloch. Route 2 runs the route in reverse.
