= Perth Lade =

Ancient watercourse in Scotland

Perth Lade King's Lade
- The lade's width and depth being measured around 1878. This stretch is behind today's Tulloch Park, the ground of Kinnoull F.C., in Tulloch

- Location of Perth Lade

Location
- Country: Scotland
- County: Perth and Kinross
- Towns: Huntingtower and Ruthvenfield; Tulloch; Perth

Physical characteristics
- Source: Low's Work (River Almond)
  - coordinates: 56°24′50″N 3°30′32″W
  - elevation: 52.5 m (172 ft)
- Mouth: River Tay
  - location: Perth
  - coordinates: 56°23′54″N 3°25′36″W
  - elevation: 14.0 m (45.9 ft)
- Length: 4.5 mi (7.2 km)

Basin features
- River system: River Almond

Perth Lade (also known as King's Lade) is a historic 4.5-mile (7.2 km)-long former mill lade in Perth and Kinross, Scotland. Created in the 11th century or earlier, it has been used to power several watermills, such as those that functioned at Perth's Lower City Mills, which have existed since the 18th century. Over its course, at least nineteen industrial sites existed; today, the remains of nine of these can be seen, the rest lost to inner-city development and housing schemes of the 20th and 21st centuries. A footpath follows the majority of the lade's course.

== History ==
In 1306, Edward I of England, then occupying the city, ordered a new ditch to be dug as part of a defence. It may have been an extension of the lade to the west and south. With this defence, and that Perth could be provisioned, via the River Tay, it meant that it was not until 1312 that Robert the Bruce (King Robert I of Scotland) could recapture the city.

== Course ==
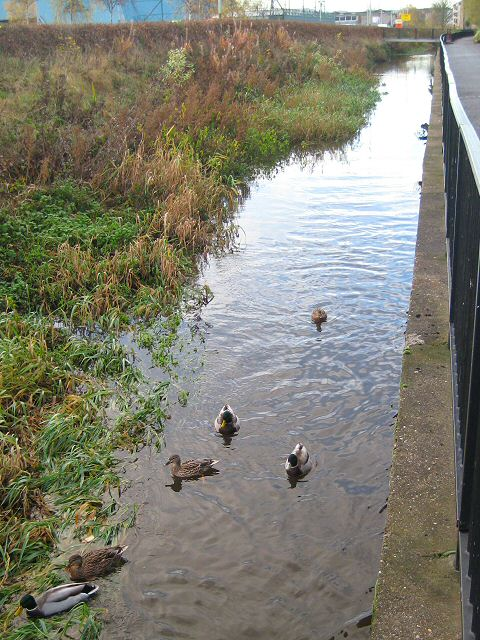
The lade near St. Catherine's Retail Park in Perth city centre

Perth Lade begins, with an elevation of 52.5 m (172 ft), at a weir, known as Low's Work (or Wark), on the River Almond, just to the west of Huntingtower, itself northwest of Perth city centre.

After travelling northeast for 750 feet, it turns southeast, at which point is passes beneath Bleachers Way in Huntingtower. After passing beneath three more streets in quick succession, it turns northeast again at Castle Brae. Another turn, to the southeast, occurs about 700 feet later as it enters Ruthvenfield. As it runs parallel to Castle Brae it flows beneath Ruthvenfield Road.

A short distance later, it goes underground for 500 feet, reemerging just after a street named Ruthven Lade.

After continuing southeast for about 450 feet, it turns due east as it approaches the link road between the A85 Crieff Road and the A9 northbound. It passes under both, as well as the southbound link road between the A9 and the A85, before running to the north of McDiarmid Park and Perth Crematorium. Walkers will traverse the Inveralmond Skywalk Footbridge around this point.

It continues due east for around 1,500 feet, into Tulloch, where it loops around the northern curve of Primrose Crescent and continues behind Tulloch Primary School.

After passing through the area of the former J. Pullar and Sons dyeworks, to the north of Sandeman Court and Bracken Brae, its course turns due south as it meets the railway. It loops to the west, around the railway sidings and crosses the edge of Kinnoull F.C.'s Tulloch Park property.

As the Lade approaches Crieff Road, it turns to the east again and passes beneath the railway line (where a footbridge crosses the line) and loops around the former location of Jeanfield Swifts F.C.'s Simpson Park home.

It passes beneath Crieff Road just east of Collinson View and continues for 2,600 feet into Perth city centre, passing under Caledonian Road and St. Catherine's Retail Park, before finishing its journey below Mill Street, from Lower City Mills to Tay Street, where it discharges into the River Tay, Scotland's longest river, from its western banks near Smeaton's Bridge at an elevation of 14.0 m (45.9 ft).

=== Course alteration ===
The junction where the lade forked to provide water for the Balhousie mill was known as the Boot of Balhousie. The Laird of Balhousie asked the king for permission to take a bootful of water from the lade, and it was granted.

After passing through the City Mills, a southern spur of the lade flowed south along the line of South Methven Street, around Canal Crescent, and turned east along Canal Street, where small boats were used to offload coal from larger vessels on the Tay, while flour from the mills was also transported.

A smaller branch of the lade continued south along the line of King Street, across the South Inch, to link up with Craigie Burn. This extension was covered over in 1802.

=== Facilities powered by the lade ===
The following facilities are (or were) located on the banks of the lade and harnessed its power (ordered from Almondbank to Perth):

- Pitcairnfield Bleachworks
- Huntingtower Bleachworks
- Shepherds Mill
- Dorwards Pump
- Ruthvenfield Bleachworks
- Tulloch Dye Works
- Balhousie Grain Mill
- Pullars Dye Works
- Mill Street Mill
- Upper and Lower City Mills
- Old Waterworks

== Gallery ==
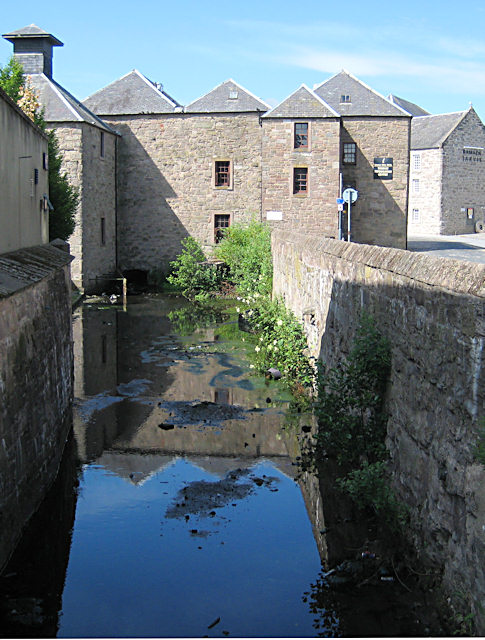
Perth Lade running beneath Lower City Mills, looking west (upstream), before it continues under Mill Street for the remaining 0.3 miles of its journey

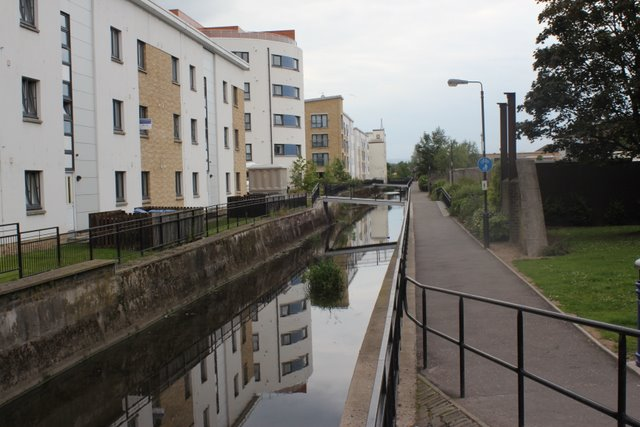
A stretch of the lade near Monart Road, looking south
