= Donald Alexander Stewart =

Scottish architect (1876–1940)

- Born: 6 July 1876; Scotland
- Died: 16 January 1940 (aged 63)
- Occupation: Architect

Donald Alexander Stewart FRIBA (6 July 1876 – 16 January 1940) was a Scottish architect, prominent in the first half of the 20th century. His design genre varied between commercial buildings, schools and churches, but he worked almost exclusively in Perthshire.

== Early life ==
Smart was born on 6 July 1876, son of Alexander Stewart, an innkeeper, and Christina McPherson.

He was educated at Sharp's Institution in Perth, Perthshire, and articled to David Smart, of Alyth, from August 1892.

== Career ==
Stewart worked in partnership with Smart's son, James, as D & J Smart. From 1896, after working in the office of Edinburgh's James Graham Fairley, he was David Smart's senior assistant, a role in which he remained until 1907, when he became partner. The firm name became Smart & Stewart.

In 1911, he emigrated to Edmonton, Alberta, Canada, where he worked for Roland Walter Lines and then as chief draughtsman and, later, chief architect to the Edmonton Public School Board.

He returned to Scotland on war service in 1916 and chose to stay.

In 1919, Stewart was an assistant to Robert Matthew Mitchell, who made him partner five years later. The firm became Smart, Stewart & Mitchell.

Stewart was elected a Fellow of the Royal Institute of British Architects (FRIBA) in November 1929.

=== Selected notable works ===
- Old Academy, Perth (1908) – alterations to preparatory department
- J. Pullar and Sons Dyeworks, Perth (1919) – reconstruction after it had been taken over by Eastman of London
- Royal George Hotel, Perth (1927) – reconstruction

== Personal life ==
Stewart married twice, first to Georgina McDougall, then to May Isobel Elliot.

== Death ==
Stewart died on 16 January 1940, aged 63.
