= Robert Matthew Mitchell =

Scottish architect (1847–1949)

- Born: 27 May 1847
- Died: 28 September 1949 (aged 75)
- Occupation: Architect

Robert Matthew Mitchell (27 May 1847 – 28 September 1949) was a Scottish architect, prominent in the second half of the 19th century and first half of the 20th. He designed several notable buildings in Perthshire, several of which are now of listed status.

== Life and career ==
Mitchell was born on 27 May 1847.

He began an apprenticeship in what was presumed to be a joiner's workshop. Basically self-taught, he found work as a junior draughtsman in the Edinburgh office of James Graham Fairley in 1896.

Two years later, he joined the firm of McLuckie and Walker, of Stirling. He took a leave of absence to tour the United States and Canada prior to establishing his own practice at 27 King Street in Crieff, Perthshire, and living at Fairmount in Auchterarder. After business slowed to a crawl, he emigrated to Edmonton, Alberta, Canada, in 1911. On 20 July of that year, prior to his departure, he was admitted as a Licentiate of the Royal Institute of British Architects.

After arriving in Edmonton, he was appointed to the office of English architect Roland Walter Lines. He remained there for a "considerable time" before becoming chief draughtsman to the Edmonton Public School Board. He later became its chief architect, as well as becoming a member of the Royal Architectural Institute of Canada.

In 1916, Mitchell closed his practice as he went to serve in World War I. He returned to Scotland to serve with the Scottish Horse.

He asked to be demobilised in 1919, and joined the architectural practice of Donald Alexander Stewart, of Smart & Stewart, in Perth. He became a partner in 1924, the company name being appended by his own. He was still with the firm when he was admitted as a Fellow of the Royal Institute of British Architects.

Stewart died in January 1940. Six years later, three years before his own death, Mitchell formed a partnership with J. Morrison and H. C. Miller but continued under the Smart, Stewart & Mitchell name.

Mitchell served on Auchterarder Town Council and was a magistrate, serving several terms.

=== Selected notable works ===
- Auchterarder Free Church (alterations; after 1901)
- Auchterarder United Free Church (alterations; after 1901)
- Monzievaird Parish Church (alterations; after 1901)
- Ormskirk War Memorial (1919)
- Dunning War Memorial (1919)
- J. Pullar and Sons dyeworks (reconstruction; 1919)
- Auchterarder Parish Church (new aisle windows; after 1919)
- Sports pavilion, Perth (1919)
- Gannochy Housing Estate, Kinnoull (1923)
- Perth Savings Bank (extensions; 1927)
- Royal George Hotel, Perth (reconstruction; 1927)
- Kinnoull Parish Church (recasting of interior; 1929)
- Thomas Hay Marshall monument, Perth Art Gallery (1929)
- Auchterarder World War II Memorial (1948)

== Death ==
Stewart died on 28 September 1949, aged 75.
