= Camilla Bell =

Scottish philanthropist

- Born: 1 November 1871
- Died: 15 January 1959 (aged 87); Perth
- Known for: Philanthropy
- Spouse: Arthur Kinmond Bell
- Website: https://www.gannochytrust.org.uk/about-us/our-history/

Camilla Bell (née Bruce) (1 November 1871- 15 January 1959) was a Scottish philanthropist. In 1899 she married the distiller and noted philanthropist AK Bell, and was a trustee of the Gannochy Trust which he set up to improve the lives of citizens of Perth. They had no children. Camilla Bell continued to contribute to local and community causes after his death, often preferring to remain anonymous. She bequeathed her home and the bulk of her estate to the Gannochy Trust in her will. Camilla Bell Park and Camilla Bell Crescent in Perth are named after her.

== Early life ==
Camilla Bruce was born on 1 November 1871 to Robert Bruce, an Edinburgh physician, and Blanca Catalina Tennant, who was from Cuba. Her maternal aunt, Enriqueta Augustina Tennant, the widow of multi-millionaire John Rylands, was a noted philanthropist who endowed the Rylands Library in Manchester.

She married Arthur Kinmond 'AK' Bell, heir to Bell's Whisky, on 8 June 1899 in Edinburgh. The couple made Kincarrathie House in Perth their main home. They had no children and used their fortune for the benefit of Perth and its citizens.

== Philanthropy ==
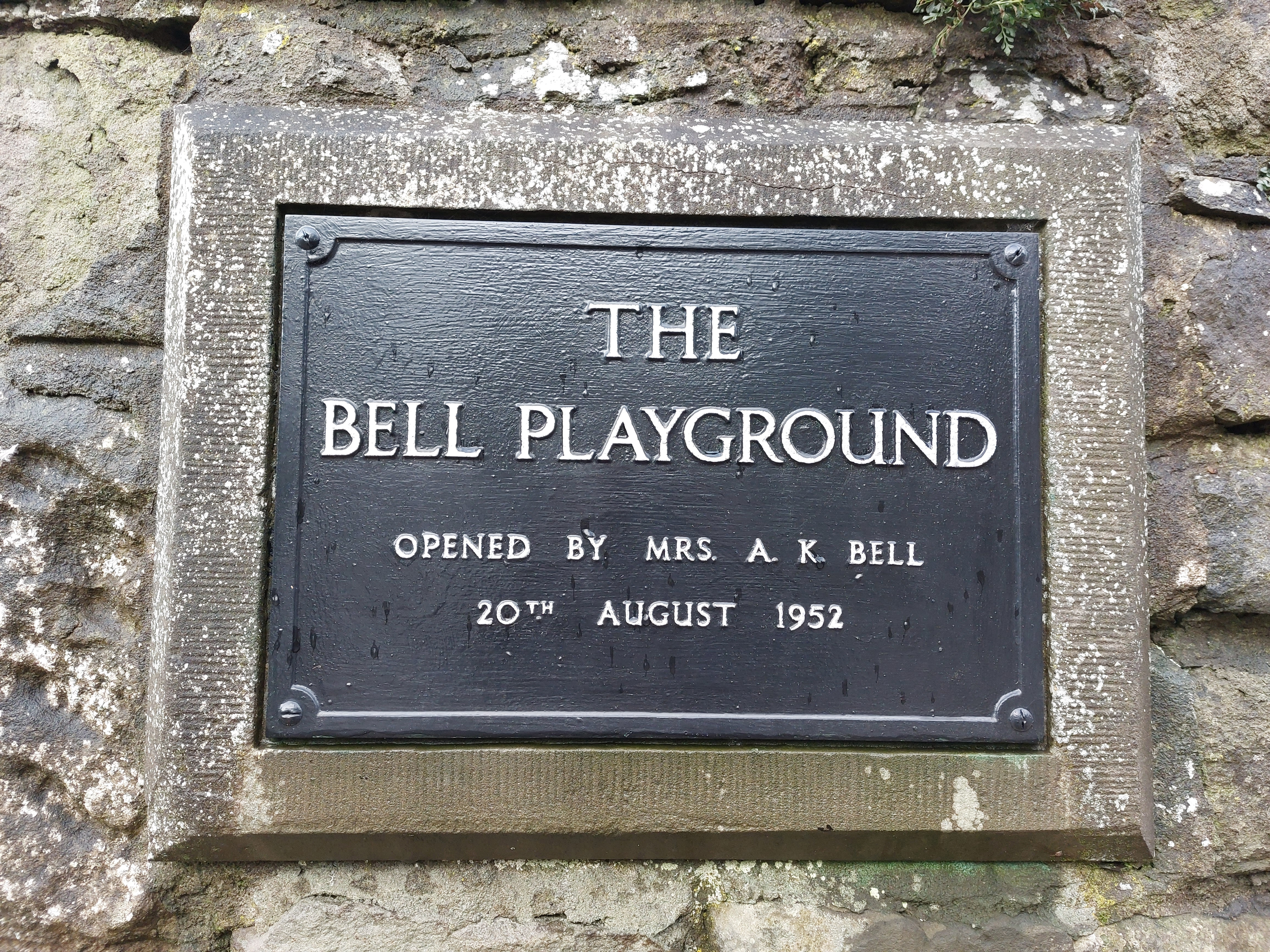
Plaque at the Bell Playground, in Bridgend, Perth, opened by Mrs AK Bell on 20th August 1952

When her husband set up the Gannochy Trust in 1937 to improve the quality of life for people living in Perth and Kinross, Bell became a trustee. In this role, she oversaw the provision of grant funding for community based initiatives in the local area and investment in capital projects in Perth from 1942-1959. After AK Bell's death in 1942, Camilla Bell served on the Board of Trustees. Bell continued to be known as a "public benefactress", and in 1952 left Kincaratthie House to the Trust. This was established as a separate Kincarrathie Trust, providing residence for the elderly.

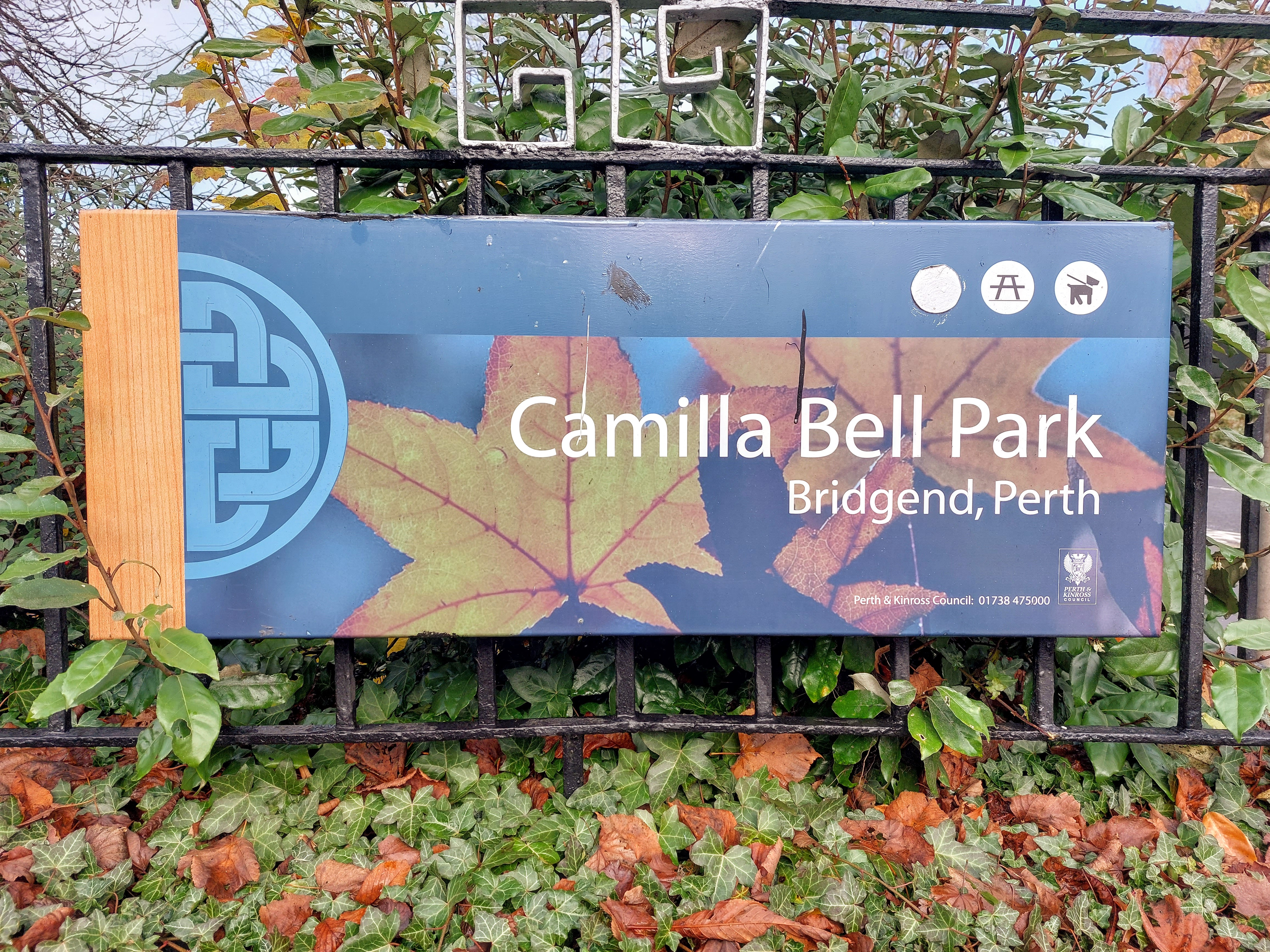
Signage at the Camilla Bell Park in Bridgend, Perth

Bell disliked publicity, so many of her benefactions were anonymous, including the restoration of the organ in Perth City Hall in 1957 at considerable expense. She was responsible for the creation of a children's play park and green space on the site of an old distillery on the corner of Isla Road and Strathmore Street, Bridgend, which she opened in 1952. This was later named Camilla Bell Park after her death.

== Later life and death ==
AK Bell had been an avid cricketer and Bell continued to support the game after his death, hosting international cricket visitors at Kincarrathie House, including Australian batsman Don Bradman. During both World Wars, Bell used Kincarrathie House as a headquarters for the preparation of dressings.

Bell died in her sleep at the age of 88 on 15 January 1959 at Kincarrathie House. She bequeathed her home and the bulk of her £383,122 estate to the Gannochy Trust. Kincarrathie House opened as a "home for aged persons" in 1961 and is now run as a residential care home administered by a separate trust.
