= Archibald Sandeman =

Scottish academic

- Born: 1822; Perth, Perth and Kinross, Scotland
- Died: 26 June 1893 (aged 70–71)

Archibald Sandeman (1822 – 26 June 1893) was a Scottish academic. He was a professor at Queens' College, Cambridge, and at Owens College in Manchester.

== Early life and education ==
Sandeman was born in 1822 to Hector Sandeman and Catherine Turnbull. His family lived at Tulloch House in Bleachfield, Perthshire. A Sandeman Court exists in Tulloch today.

He was educated at the University of Edinburgh, followed by St John's College, Cambridge, from which he graduated in 1842.

Sandeman also studied at Queens' College, Cambridge, and graduated in 1846. He was later a professor there.

== Career ==
He was also the first Professor of Natural Philosophy and Mathematics at Owens College in Manchester. He held the posts between 1851 and 1865, at which point he began a brief academic role at Queens' College. His father's death in 1855 forced his return to Scotland,

He later became a linen bleacher at J. Pullar and Sons in Tulloch.

== Personal life ==
Sandeman published A Treatise on the Motion of a Single Particle, and of Two Particles Acting on One Another in 1850.

He was elected to the Manchester Literary and Philosophical Society in 1851, and remained a member for 42 years.

The Sandeman Library, in Perth, is named for him, his having bequeathed the building.

After returning to Scotland in 1855, he lived with his widowed mother, then with his brother Hector and sister Agnes at Garry Cottage on the Dundee Road in Barnhill. His siblings died, within days of each other, in December 1891.

An Episcopalian, he was a generous supporter of Perth's St John's Episcopal Church.

== Death ==
Sandeman died on 26 June 1893, aged 71.

== Bibliography ==
- A Treatise on the Motion of a Single Particle, and of Two Particles Acting on One Another, Archibald Sandeman (1850) ISBN 0282211489
