= Stuart Cosgrove =

Scottish journalist (born 1952)

Stuart John Francis Cosgrove (born 12 November 1952) is a Scottish journalist, broadcaster and television executive. As a journalist, Cosgrove served on the NME (as media editor) and The Face during the 1980s, before joining Channel 4 in 1994, serving for eight years as Controller of Arts and Entertainment and then as Head of Programmes (Nations and Regions) until stepping down in 2015.

== Education ==
Cosgrove graduated in Drama and English from the University of Hull and has studied at George Mason University, Harvard’s John F. Kennedy School of Government and Wharton Business School. He has a Ph.D. in Media (the thesis published as part of the book Theatres of the Left, 1880–1935) and a Doctorate in English and American Studies. He has been awarded an honorary Doctor of Arts by the University of Abertay Dundee and honorary professorships by the University of Stirling and Liverpool John Moores University.

== Career ==
Cosgrove is the co-host of BBC Radio Scotland's popular comedy football phone-in Off the Ball, which he presents twice a week with Tam Cowan, and as the co-host of BBC Scotland's Saturday football Sportscene results show. Born and brought up in the Letham area of Perth, but living now in Dennistoun, he is a fan of St Johnstone.

== Personal life ==
Cosgrove's father, a Perth native, was killed in his early 30s in a road accident in 1960, when Cosgrove was eight years old. A lorry driver for the Co-op supermarket, one of the tyres of the lorry he was travelling in as a passenger blew, and the lorry hit a tree. His mother lived until she was 90.

Cosgrove began supporting his hometown club St Johnstone because, before the Tulloch estate to the northeast came to be, he could see their then-ground Muirton Park from his Letham bedroom window. For the first three or four years of his life, the family lived in Hillyland before the short move to Strathtay Road in Letham when he was about seven years of age.

Cosgrove is married to Shirani, a TV executive of Sri Lankan Tamil heritage, with whom he has a son. He also has a daughter. He was previously married (1992–1999) to Angie, a beautician.

== Bibliography ==
- Theatres of the Left, 1880-1935, Workers' Theatre Movements in Britain and America, by Raphael Samuel, Ewan MacColl and Stuart Cosgrove, 1985. ISBN 0-7100-0901-1
- Flogging a Dead Horse: Heritage Culture and Its Role in Post-industrial Britain, Manchester: Cornerhouse, 1993. ISBN 0-948797-52-5. With photographs by Paul Reas and an afterword by Val Williams.
- Detroit 67: The Year That Changed Soul, Polygon, 2016
- Young Soul Rebels: A Personal History of Northern Soul, Polygon, 2017
- Memphis 68: The Tragedy of Southern Soul Polygon, 2018
- Harlem 69: The Future of Soul, Polygon, 2018
- Cassius X: A Legend in the Making, Birlinn General, 2020
- Hey America!: The Epic Story of Black Music and the White House, Birlinn General, 2020
