= Tulloch, Perth and Kinross =

Coordinates: 56.411°N 3.466°W

Tulloch
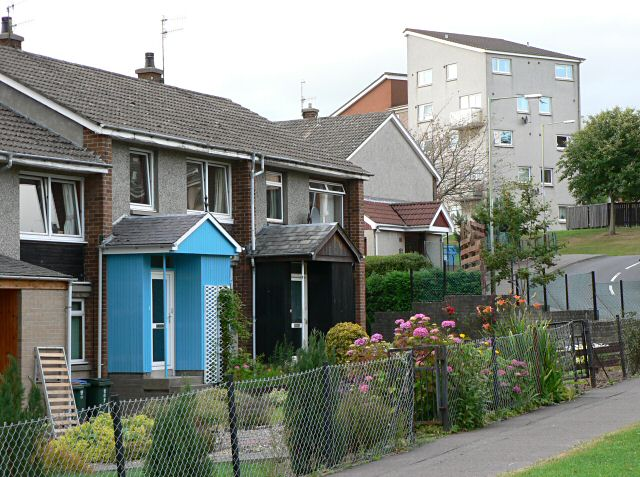
- A row of terraced housing on Tulloch's Primrose Place

- Location within Perth and Kinross
- OS grid reference: NO095255
- Council area: Perth and Kinross
- Lieutenancy area: Perth and Kinross
- Country: Scotland
- Sovereign state: United Kingdom
- Post town: PERTH
- Postcode district: PH1
- Dialling code: 01738
- Police: Scotland
- Fire: Scottish
- Ambulance: Scottish
- UK Parliament: Perth and Kinross-shire
- Scottish Parliament: Perthshire South and Kinross-shire

Tulloch, formerly known as Bleachfield, is a residential area of Perth, Scotland, approximately 1.5 miles (2.4 km) north-west of the city centre. Tulloch is the western part of the area that borders Hillyland.

The main access road to Tulloch, from the east or west, is Tulloch Road, reached via the Crieff Road (A85), which bounds it to the south. It is also accessible, albeit less directly, from the Dunkeld Road (A912), which bounds it to the north-east, via a modern housing development. It is bounded to the north-west by the A9.

Tulloch has a small shopping precinct, Tulloch Square, located just off Tulloch Terrace. Tulloch Primary School, founded in 1969, is located on Gillespie Place. It can accommodate 400 pupils.

Primrose Crescent, a main thoroughfare which, upon merging from Tulloch Road and Hillyland, circumnavigates Tulloch's oldest residential area before joining up with Tulloch Road again just before its western junction with Crieff Road.

A map of 1832 Perth, by James Gardner, showing Tulloch had not yet been created. There are a "few houses" in Hillyland, however

The skyline is dominated by several high-rise flats.

In addition to the new housing development in the north-east of Tulloch/Hillyland, homes have also been built to the north and west. These are in addition to the first development (Sandeman Court) that went up in the 1980s in the valley behind the primary school, near the railway siding at the bottom of the hill. Between the housing and the railway siding is Perth Lade, which is sourced from Low's Work, a weir on the River Almond south of Almondbank, and empties 4.5 miles (7.2 km) away into the River Tay, near Smeaton's Bridge, via the city. A walking path runs parallel to the lade. Ladeside Court, a cul-de-sac off Fairfield Avenue, takes its name from the body of water.

J. Pullar and Sons Ltd.'s Tulloch Works, a dry cleaning plant, once stood on the site of the present-day Bracken Brae. At the turn of the 20th century, architectural firm comprising John Honeyman, John Keppie and Charles Rennie Mackintosh designed a row of buildings for workers at the dyeworks. They were single-storey, semi-detached roughcast cottages. There were also two two-storey blocks containing a total of ten flats. The eight cottages remain, today's 61–75 Tulloch Terrace; the two flats have been demolished. Pullars also built Tulloch School, for their workers' children, in 1895. The school closed in 1911, and the building was later used by the Tulloch Institute.

From certain parts of Tulloch, views are afforded of the hills beyond Scone to the east, including an obelisk on the 279-foot (85 m) summit of a hill near Muirend. To the north, the Grampian Mountains can be seen.

== Sport ==
McDiarmid Park, the home of Perth's professional football club, St Johnstone, is located on Crieff Road at the western edge of Tulloch, in close proximity to the crematorium, while junior club Kinnoull are based on Tulloch Road.

== Transport ==
Tulloch can be reached via the number 1 and number 2 buses from the centre of Perth. The number 1 originates from Mill Street; the number 2 from South Street.

== Businesses ==
Morris Young Ltd., a haulage company, was located between Crieff and Tulloch Roads just beyond their junction between 1952 and 2020. Its lorry fleet was visible parked atop the hill located at the former Hillyland Farm.

== Notable people ==
- Stuart Cosgrove – prior to moving to nearby Letham, Cosgrove and his family lived in Tulloch
- Archibald Sandeman, scholar

== Gallery ==
Tulloch Primary School, after its £11-million expansion in 2018

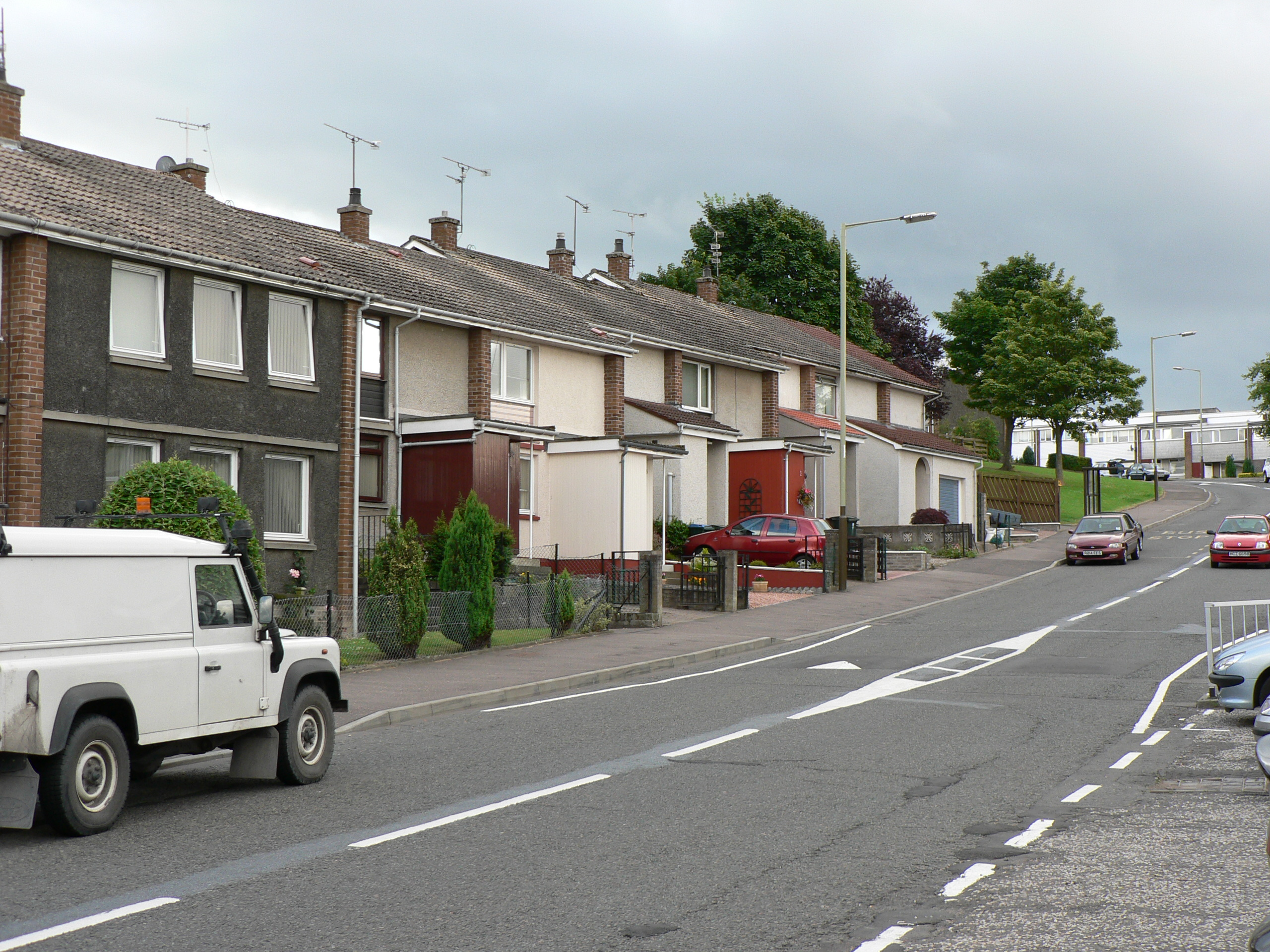
A view of Primrose Crescent, near its junction with Pullar Terrace

The first home in a terrace

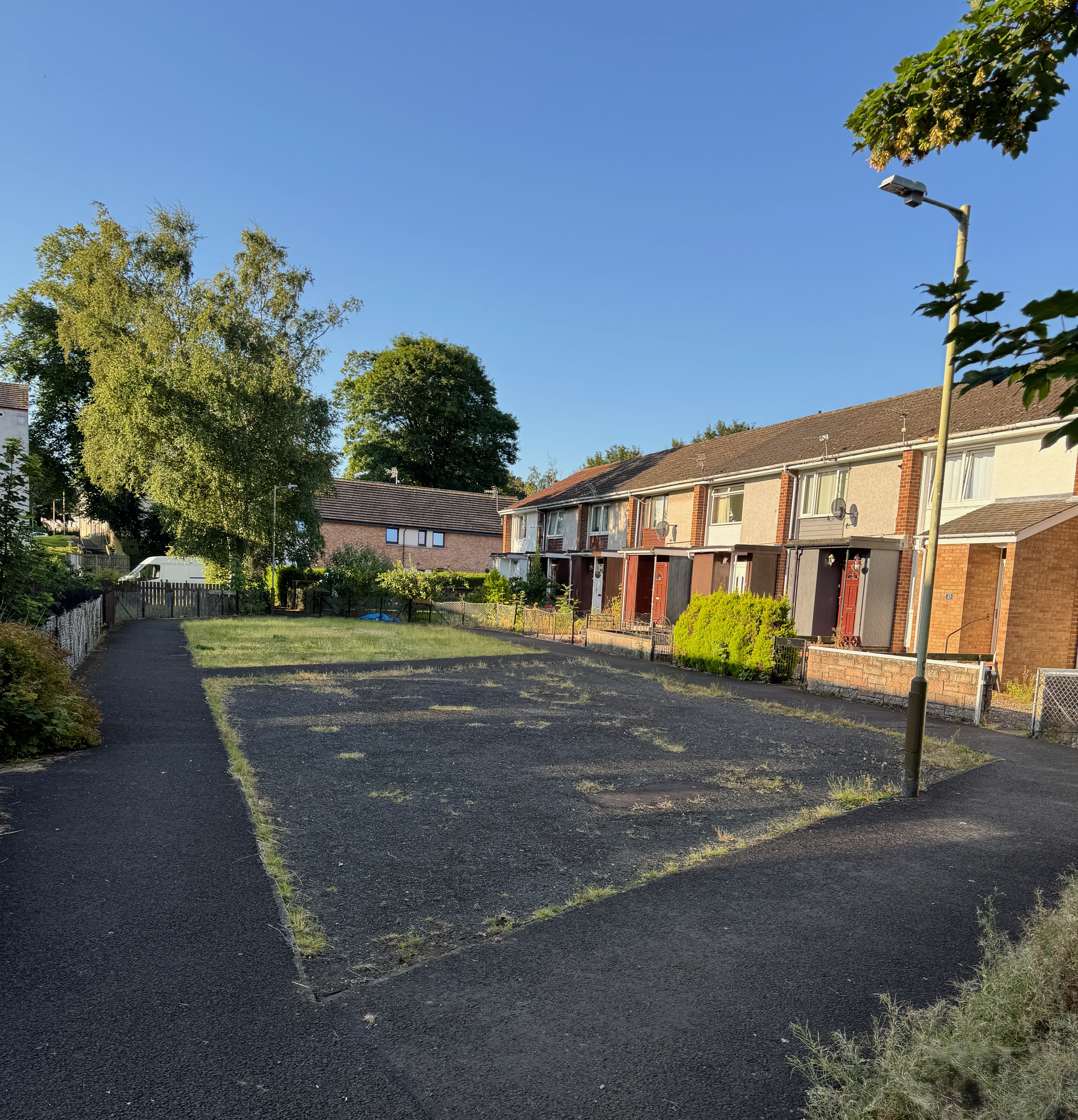
One of the communal play areas which formerly featured monkey bars and swings
