= Lower City Mills =

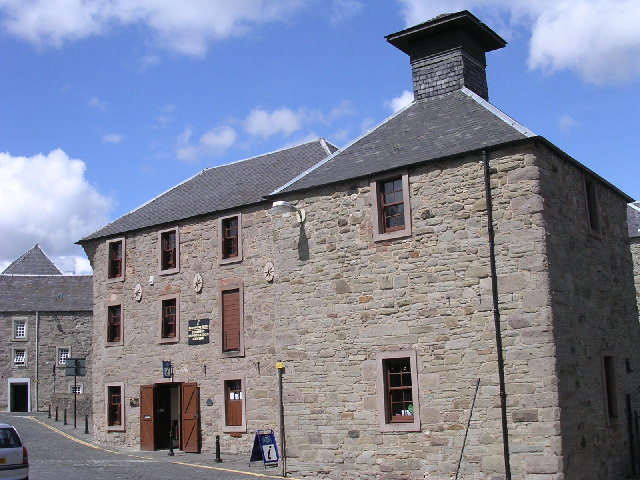
- The entrance on Mill Wynd in 2005. Part of Upper City Mills is visible on the left

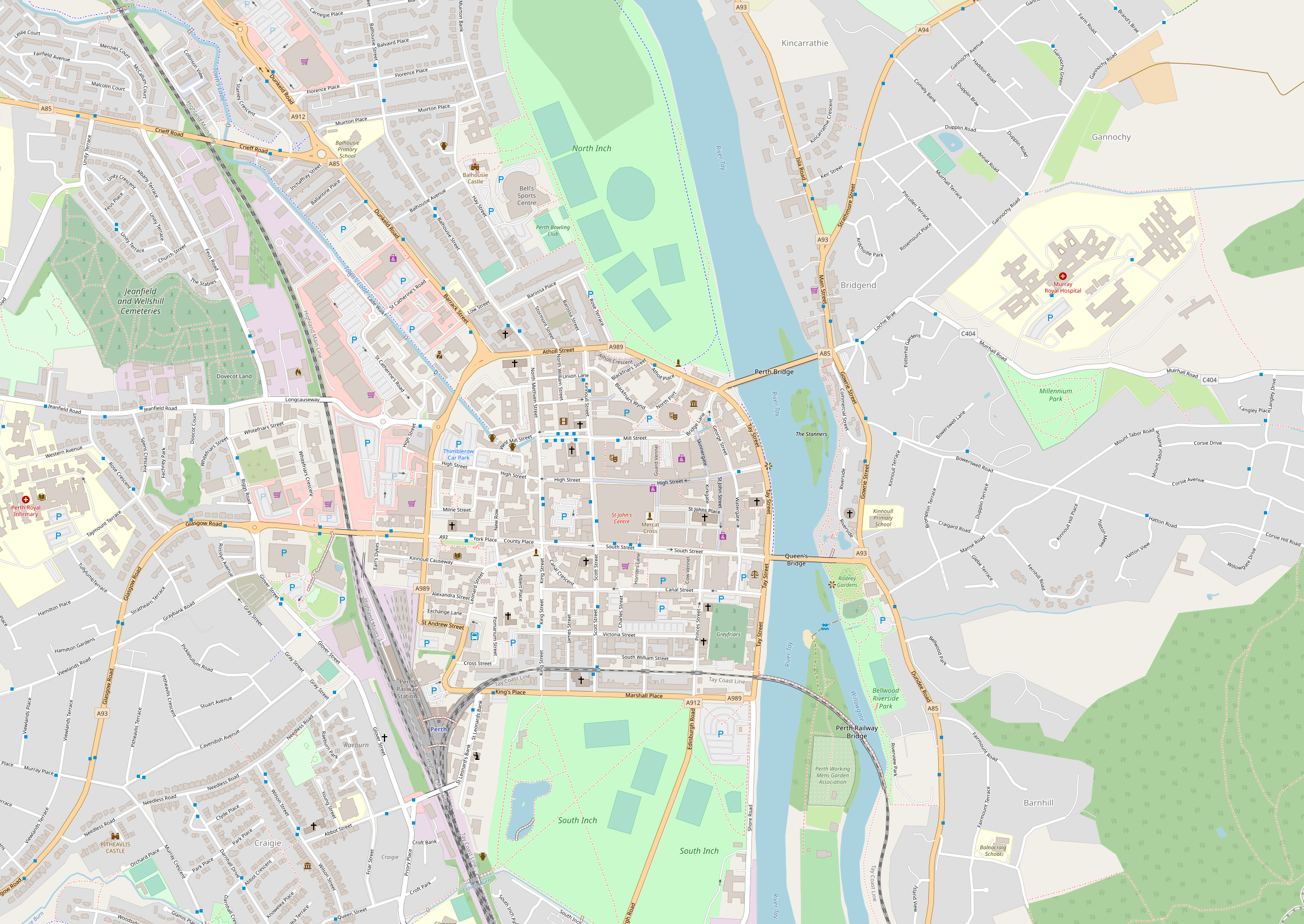
- Location within Perth
- Coordinates: 56°23′51″N 3°26′08″W

Construction
- Completed: 1715 (311 years ago)
- Renovated: circa 1805

Water Power
- Diameter / width of water wheel: 4.7 m / 3.7 m

Equipment
- Mule Frames

Listed Building – Grade A
- Official name: Lower City Mills
- Designated: 20 May 1965
- Reference no.: 39578

Lower City Mills is part of a cluster of former watermill buildings, collectively known as City Mills, in Perth, Scotland. It was given Category A listed status in 1965 by Scotland's Ancient Monument Division (now Historic Environment Scotland). Milling has taken place at the location since the 14th century.

Upper City Mills is at the same location, on West Mill Street, and they processed wheat, oats, barley and peas and incorporated beer production and bread made from some these milled ingredients.

The "whole rights and privileges" of the mills were gifted by charter of King Robert II in 1375.

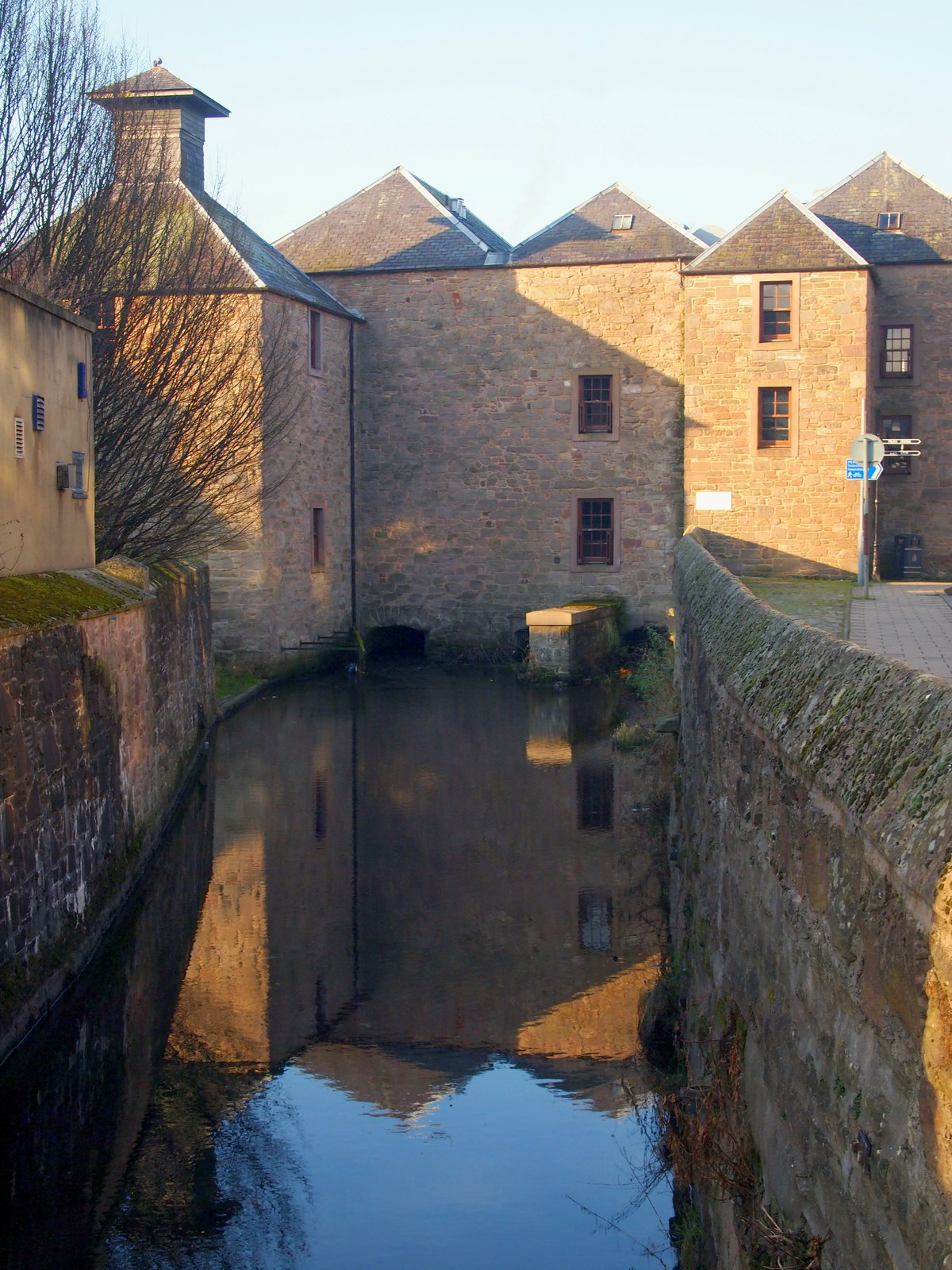
Perth Lade running beneath the mill building

Initially there were two buildings on the site, on either side of Perth Lade, whose water powered the mills' wheels. Each had its own water wheel. The one in the North building was dedicated to grinding oats, while the one in the South building produced pot barley and oats. These were consolidated into a single one in the centre of the building, measuring 3.7 metres in width and 4.7 metres in diameter.

A map, drawn by military engineer Lewis Petit des Etans, dating from 1715 shows a mill at this site. Lower City Mills has had several rebuilds over the centuries. A fire in 1803 resulted in both buildings being rebuilt to a design by millwright John Stewart. It was he who reduced the number of wheels from two to one. The buildings in view today were reconstructed around 1805, when the city was in the midst of a milling boom.

In 1807, a study found that the mills were worked by four waterfalls, totalling about thirteen feet from the upper mill to the lower mill. The volume of water in the lade in October of that year was 3,180 cubic feet, and the calculations suggested that, if properly harnessed, this would product the equivalent of a 60-horsepower steam engine.

James Macdonald & Son Grain Merchants and Millers were based at the mills in the early 20th century. Its offices were at 52 South Methven Street.

In 1938, the production of barley was stopped, and its machinery removed to make space for the storage of oats. This refurbishment also introduced an early electrical motor to drive an automatic oat-drying kiln. This allowed the water wheel to focus its power on sifting, dressing and grinding oats until 1953, when business started to slow. The demand for oatmeal was falling with the rise in popularity of British-grown wheat for bread, as well as the competition from larger, more modern, producers, who could perform the same procedure at reduced cost and more efficiently.

Two further electric motors were installed in an attempt to halt the mill's decline, but production ceased in 1966.

In the 1980s, Perth and Kinross District Council, with the support of The Gannochy Trust, amongst others, oversaw a complete overhaul of the mill.

During the late 1980s and through the 1990s, it produced mainly wheat flour for a local bakery, and along with the building's accommodation of new craft workshops and a tearoom, it became a tourist attraction.

In 2001 it became the home of Perth Visitor Information Centre and the Perthshire Tourist Board, and then VisitScotland until June 2019.

The structure has been on the Buildings at Risk Register since 2012, but in November 2019, Perth and Kinross Heritage Trust assumed a caretaker role of the building as both office space and with a vision for a sustainable new future for the building.

== See also ==
- List of Category A listed buildings in Perth and Kinross
- List of listed buildings in Perth, Scotland
