= Mill Street (Perth, Scotland) =

Prominent street in Perth, Scotland

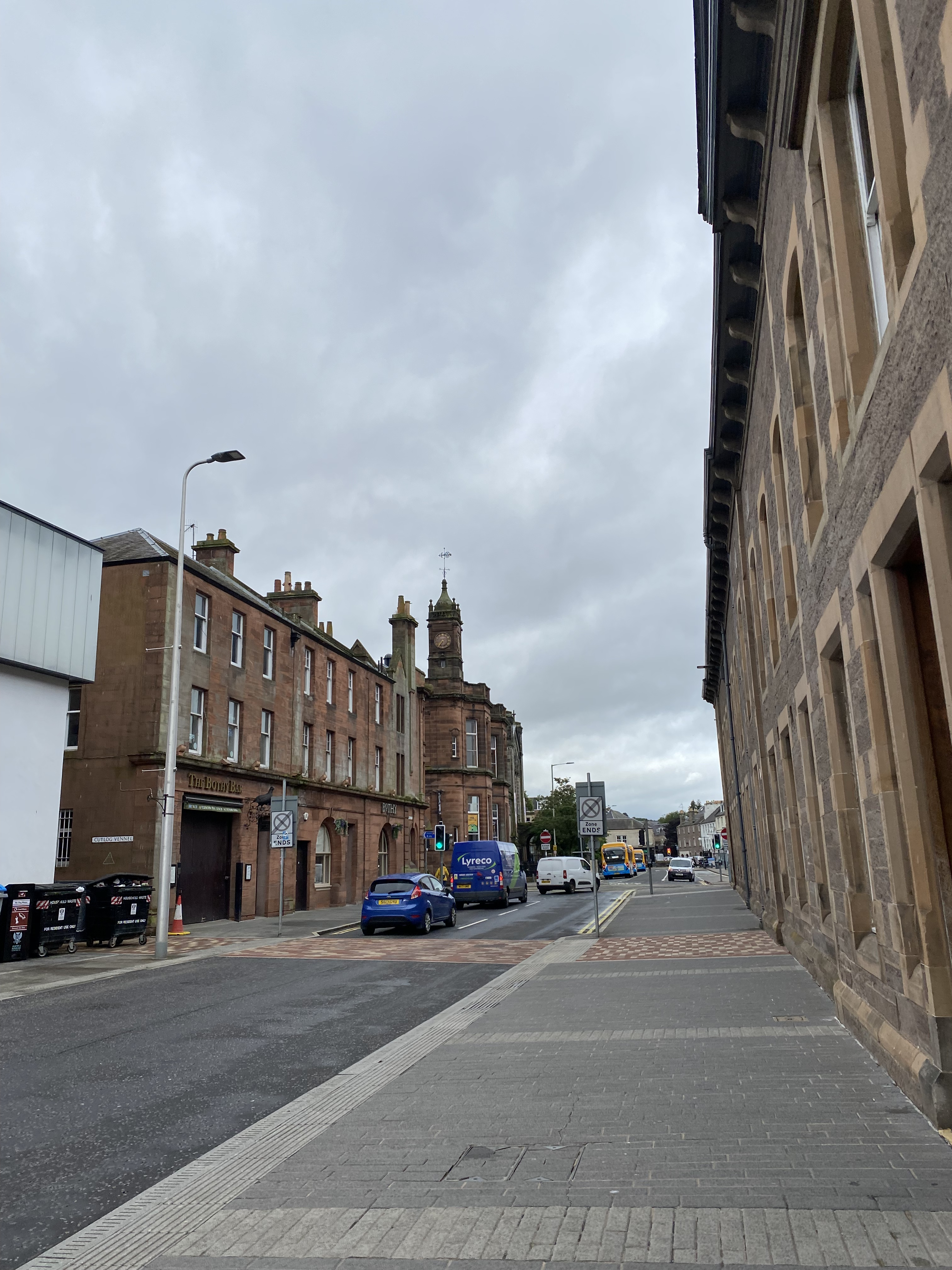
- Mill Street in 2023
- Interactive map of Mill Street
- Length: 0.25 mi (0.40 km)
- Location: Perth, Perth and Kinross, Scotland
- East end: Bridge Lane
- West end: South Methven Street

Construction
- Completion: 18th century

Mill Street is a prominent street in the city of Perth, Scotland. Established in at least the 18th century, it runs for about 0.25 miles (0.40 km), from Bridge Lane in the east to South Methven Street in the west, passing through roughly two-thirds of the northern third of the city centre.

Perth developed from an initial plan of two parallel streets: South Street and High Street in the 15th century. Mill Street, to the north of High Street, followed shortly thereafter. High and South Streets became linked by several vennels leading north and south, and a couple more appeared that connected Mill Street to High Street. Kinnoull Street is the only road that connects to it throughout its quarter-mile length.

Lower City Mills, a Category A listed structure, was established in West Mill Street in 1715, but mills had previously been on the site before the street was officially recognised as such.

Pullar House, on Mill Street, was once used by J. Pullar and Sons dyeworks, the largest industry in Perth at one time, and has since been converted into office use for Perth and Kinross Council.

The ancient Perth Lade passes beneath Mill Street on the final stretch of its 4.5 mi (7.2 km) journey east from Huntingtower and Ruthvenfield to Tay Street, where it discharges into the River Tay.

The entrance to Perth Theatre was moved to Mill Street in the 21st century, replacing the notable one on High Street.

== Public transport ==
While Perth bus station is mostly used for out-of-town routes, routes in and around Perth originate and terminate on Mill Street.

== Vennels ==
The below vennels begin or end on Mill Street.

- Cow Vennel (Mill Street to High Street) – so named because it is where people would drive their cattle onto the South Inch for grazing
- Cutlog Vennel (Mill Street to 189 High Street)
- Guard Vennel (Mill Street to 105 High Street)

== Buildings ==
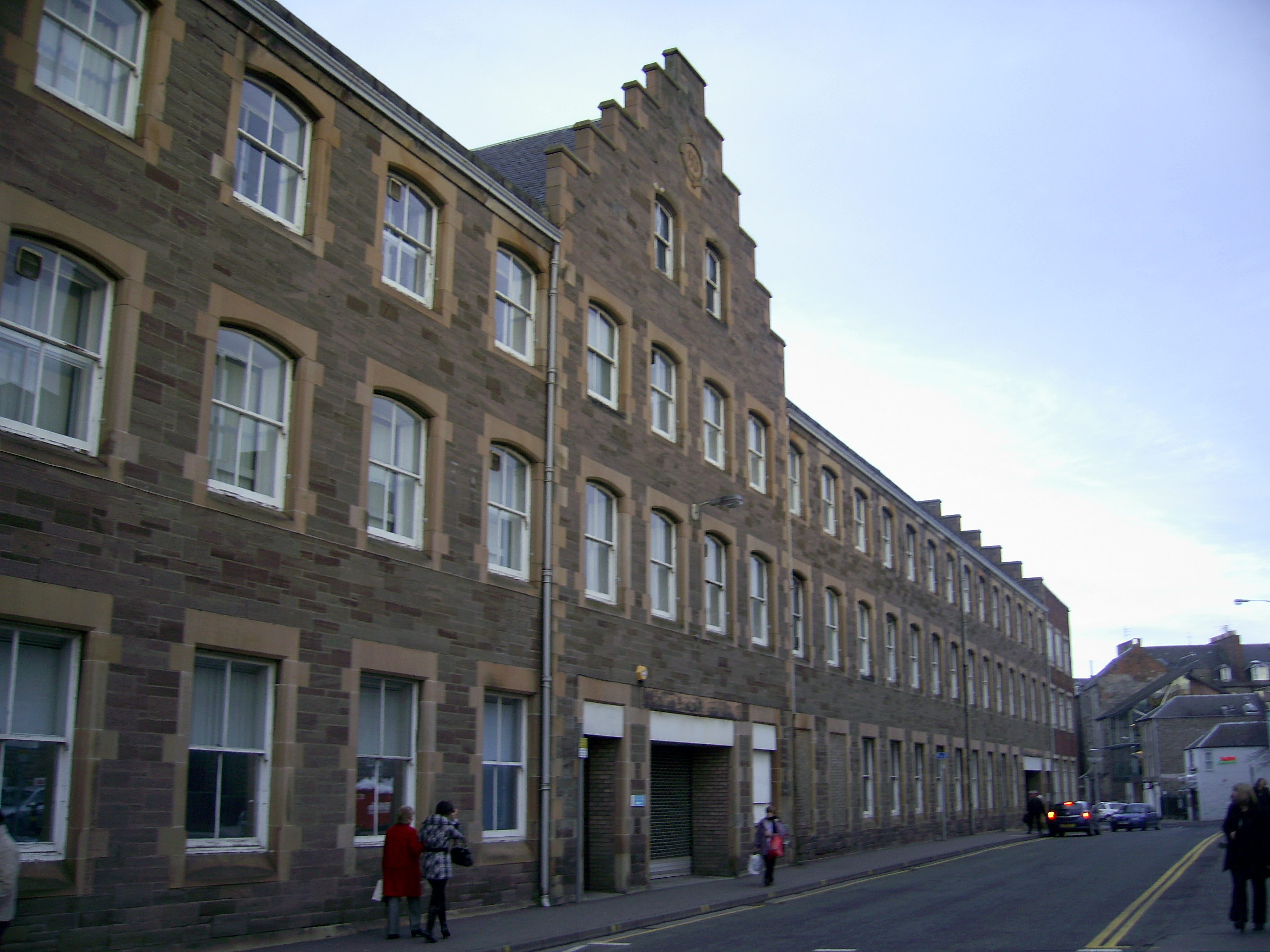
The former Pullar House, at 36 Mill Street, pictured in 2008

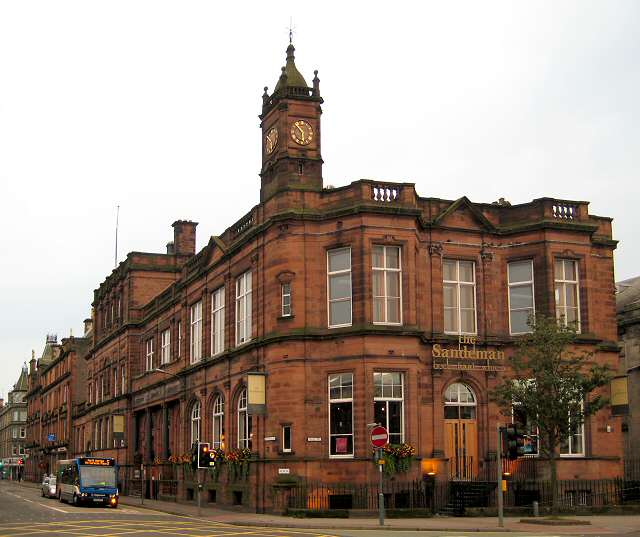
The Sandeman stands at the corner of Mill Street and Kinnoull Street

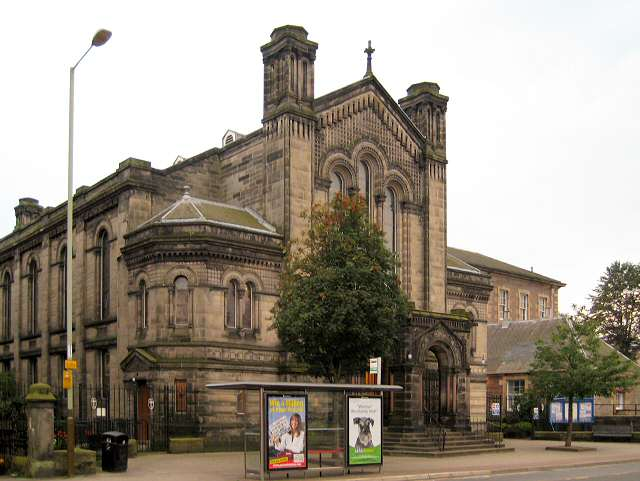
Perth North Church

== Map ==
This 1832 map of Perth, by James Gardner, shows Mill Street as one of the three main thoroughfares of the time
