= Bell's Sports Centre =

Sports centre in Perth, Scotland

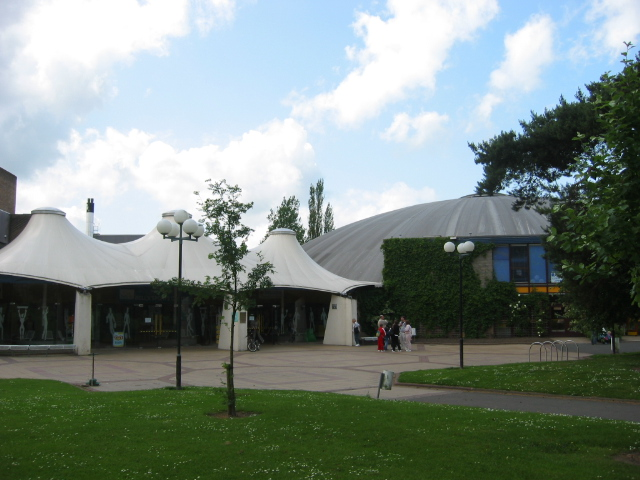
- The building's main entrance, looking southwest, 2007
- Interactive map of Bell's Sports Centre
- Former names: Gannochy Trust Sports Complex
- Location: Hay Street; Perth, Scotland
- Coordinates: 56.4029°N 3.4353°W
- Owner: Perth and Kinross Council

Construction
- Opened: 15 October 1968 (57 years ago)
- Renovated: 1989–1991
- Expanded: 1975–1979
- Closed: May 2024 (2 years ago)
- Cost: £150,000 (initial; a fire meant this was exceeded)
- Architect: David Cockburn

Tenant
- Perthshire RFC (Scottish National League Division Three) (1968–present)

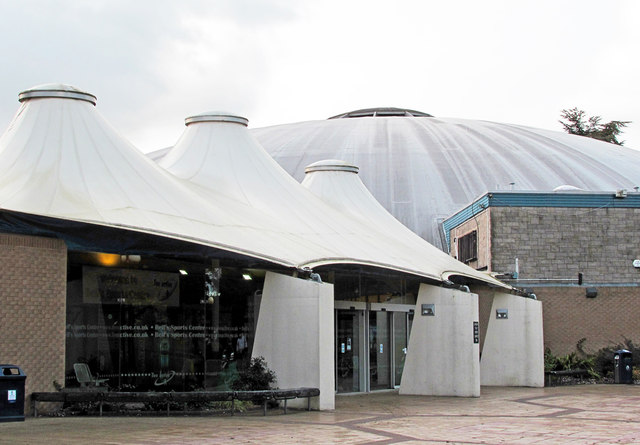
Dome detail

Bell's Sports Centre, formerly known as the Gannochy Trust Sports Complex, is located in Perth, Scotland. Built in 1968, it stands at the western edge of the city's North Inch park, adjacent to Balhousie Castle.

At the time of its opening, its domed roof, over 220 ft (67 m) in diameter, was the largest laminated timber dome in the United Kingdom. It was surpassed by London's Millennium Dome in 1999.

Owned by Perth and Kinross Council, it was operated by Live Active Leisure on behalf of Perth and Kinross Council.

== History ==
In the early 1960s, Perth's then-lord provost Dr Robert Ritchie discussed plans for a sports facility in the city. In 1964, it was announced that the Gannochy Trust, founded in 1937 by Arthur Kinmond Bell and of which W. G. Farquharson, the trust's chairman, funded the estimated £150,000 cost of the building's construction. The venue was to be named after Bell, due to his love of sport and of his concern for the health of Perth's citizens.

Construction of the facility began on 16 September 1966, and its foundation stone was laid by Farquharson on 20 March 1967. David K. Thomson, who had succeeded Dr Robert Ritchie as lord provost, presided over the ceremony.

The planned opening was originally in March 1968, but a fire broke out in the building, severely damaging the dome. Most of the 36 arches had to be replaced. After the extensive repairs, Bell's Sports Centre opened on 15 October 1968, six months behind schedule.

The Gannochy Sports Pavilion was built on the dome's southeastern side between 1975 and 1979, designed by Esmé Gordon. The two buildings were linked and modernised between 1989 and 1991, with squash courts added.

Bell's Sports Centre was one of the venues used during the 2011–12 UEFA Futsal Cup.

In October 2023, the building was flooded after Perth and Kinross Council failed to close the River Tay floodgates in time after heavy rainfall. The gym was moved to the Dewar's Centre on Glover Street, while the sports centre is likely to be closed permanently after it was estimated that repairs to the building were likely to cost around £2 million. The future of Perth Leisure Pool and the Dewar's Centre are also in doubt, due to their losing money annually. Plans for a new sports centre, initially discussed a decade earlier, were started again in 2024. In May 2024, the building was closed, pending a decision on its future use.

== Design ==
36 arches, each 115 ft (35 m) long, support the 220 ft (67 m) domed roof, which is 50 ft (15 m) tall. The facility has 32,000 sq ft (3,000 m^{2}) of floor space.

== Facilities ==
Up until 2023, its floor space accommodated courts for tennis, badminton, volleyball, netball and basketball. It also had a running track that equated to one mile per eleven laps, a 60-metre sprint track, long-, high- and triple-jumps, pole vault, hammer, discus and javelin. It also had facilities for indoor football, hockey, practice cricket wickets and golf.

Former British number-one tennis player Elena Baltacha formerly practiced at Bell's Sports Centre with her father Sergei Baltacha in the early 1990s, when her father played for St Johnstone, the city's professional football club.

In 2021, Live Active Leisure announced plans to invest £750,000 to build a new fitness gym and exercise studio at the centre. The plans were of concern to the city's various sport clubs who would be losing the use of the centre's coaching hall.

Swimming was not available at the centre; there is instead Perth Leisure Pool, located around 0.65 miles (1.05 km) to the southeast. Adjacent to the pool is the Dewar's Centre, which offers ice skating and curling.

Perthshire RFC used the pavilion's changing rooms, although their home field is officially the North Inch.

There was also a restaurant on site.

== Works cited ==
- Duncan 2012 – Duncan, Jeremy (2012). A Roof Over One's Head. Perth: Farquhar and Son Ltd. ISBN 978-0-9560620-7-9.
