= Royal George Hotel, Perth =

Hotel in Perth, Scotland

Royal George Hotel
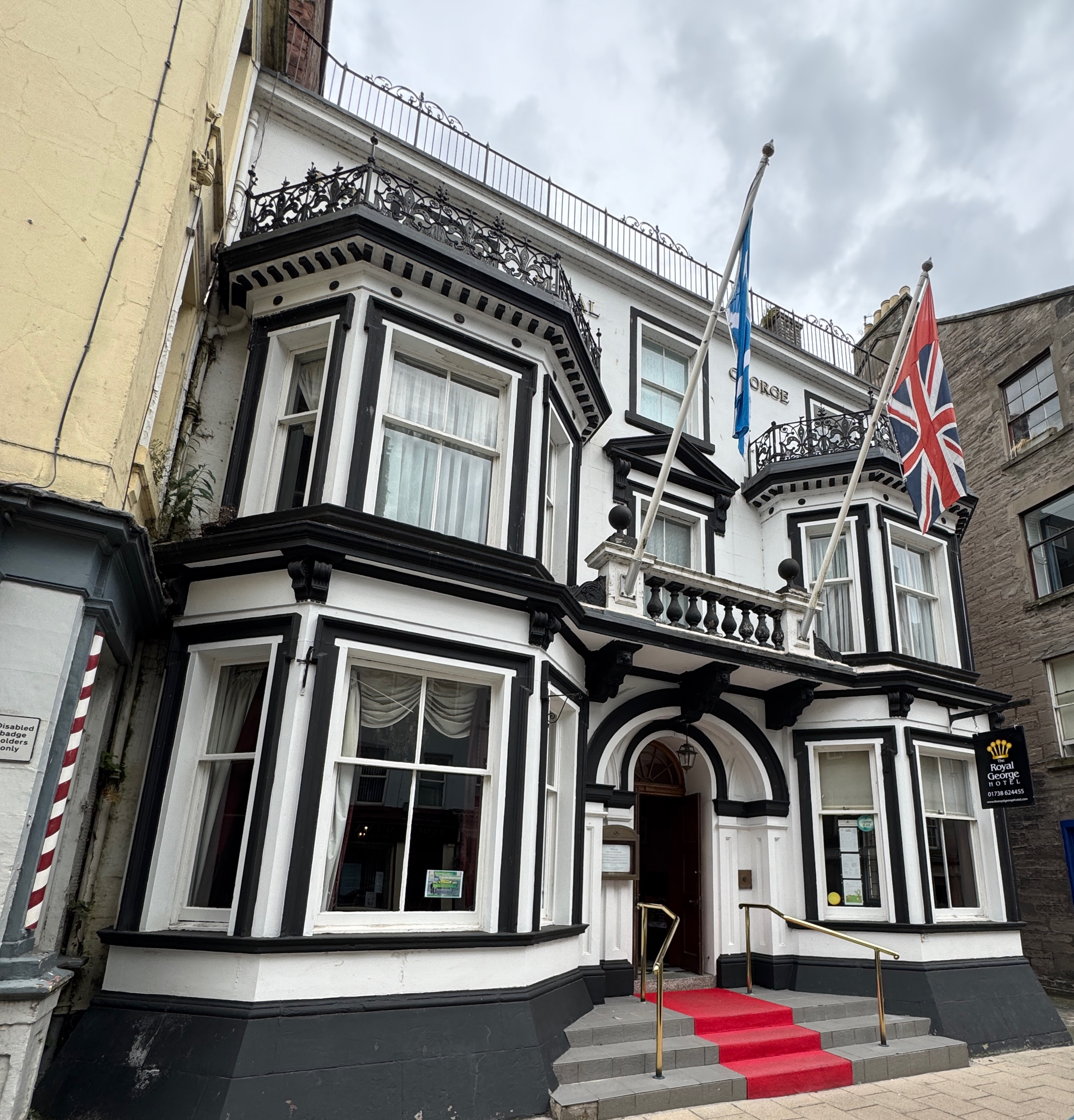
- A 2024 view from George Street
- Interactive map of the Royal George Hotel area
- Former names: The George Inn

General information
- Status: Completed
- Type: Hotel
- Architectural style: Victorian renaissance
- Location: 54 George Street; Perth, Scotland
- Coordinates: 56°23′53″N 3°25′38″W
- Named for: George III
- Completed: 1773 (253 years ago)
- Owner: Anderson Hotels

Technical details
- Floor count: 3 (plus attic)

Other information
- Number of rooms: 45
- Public transit: Perth

Website
- theroyalgeorgehotel.co.uk

Listed Building – Category B
- Official name: GEORGE STREET 47-51 (E SIDE) ROYAL GEORGE HOTEL (ODD NUMBERS)
- Designated: 26 August 1977
- Reference no.: LB39439

The Royal George Hotel (also known as The Royal George) is a hotel and restaurant in Perth, Scotland. It is a Category B listed building dating to 1773. Its main entrance is on George Street, though its Tay Street frontage, overlooking the River Tay, is more well known. It is named for George III. It adjoins a reputed section of Perth City Walls.

Notable visitors to the hotel include Empress Eugenie and Queen Victoria, her husband, Albert, Prince Consort, and their children, who stayed there on 29 September 1848, during their journey south after holidaying at Balmoral Castle. (William Murray, 4th Earl of Mansfield, was out of town and, thus, they were unable to stay at Scone Palace, just under two miles to the north.) It was Victoria's first time staying in a hotel. After breakfast at the hotel the following morning, the family left for Carlisle on the recently built Scottish Central Railway. Then named The George Inn, the business was renamed The Royal George Hotel in her honour. (The street adjacent to the property on its southern side is named George Inn Lane.) Both the Royal Warrant and two lamps from the room the monarch slept in are still in the hotel today.

Queen Victoria returned to Perth in 1864 to unveil a statue of her husband, who died three years earlier, at the North Inch.

Local architect Donald Alexander Stewart, in partnership with Robert Matthew Mitchell, undertook some reconstruction work on the hotel in 1927.

Prince Edward, Earl of Wessex, dined at the hotel in 2003.

The hotel has 45 rooms.

The hotel regularly host events for right and far-right UK political parties, including events for the Scottish Conservatives, the launch of the British National Party Holyrood Manifesto in 2011, and the Reform UK Scottish Party Conference in 2024.

== Gallery ==
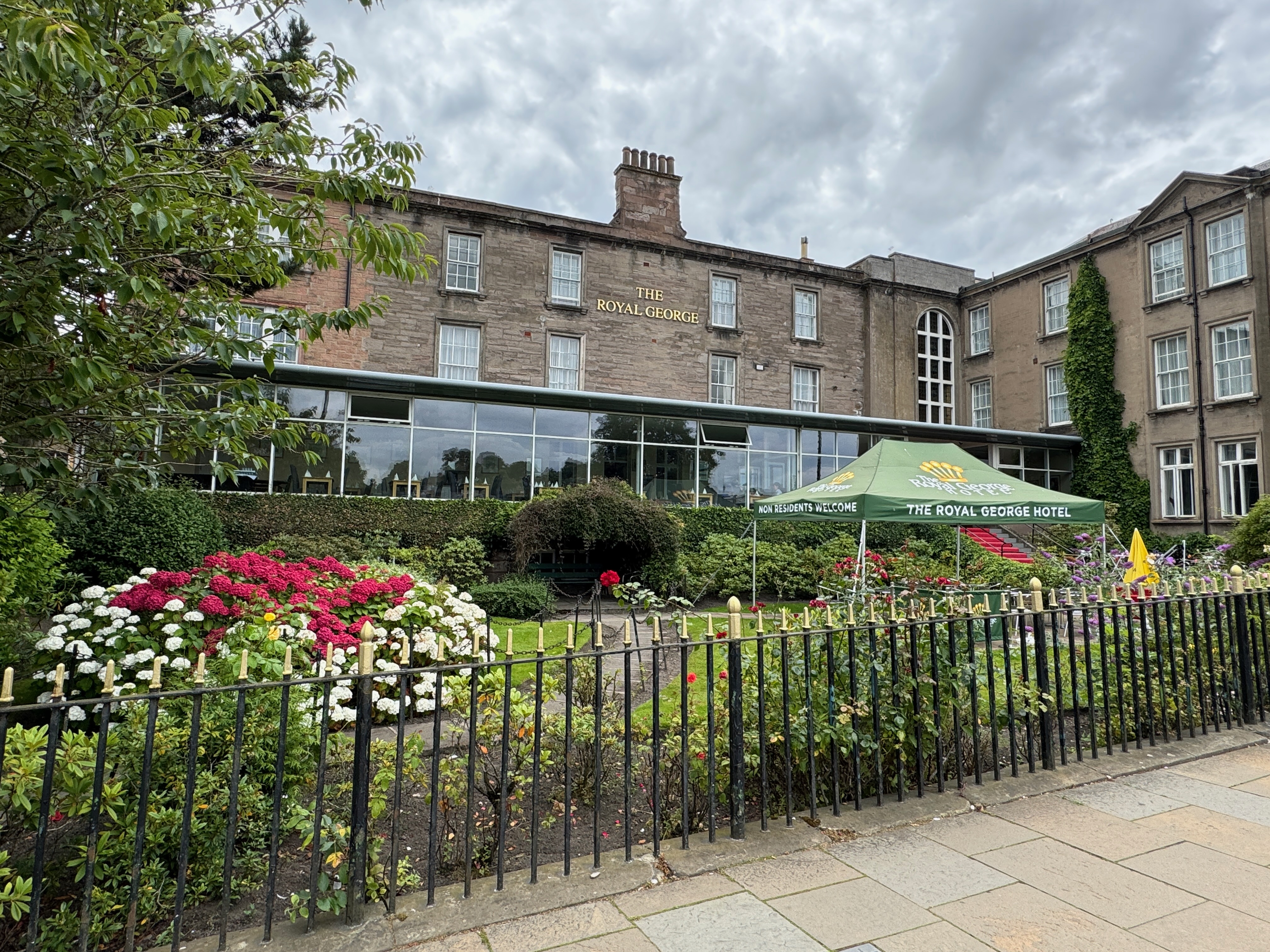
The hotel's Tay Street frontage (2024)

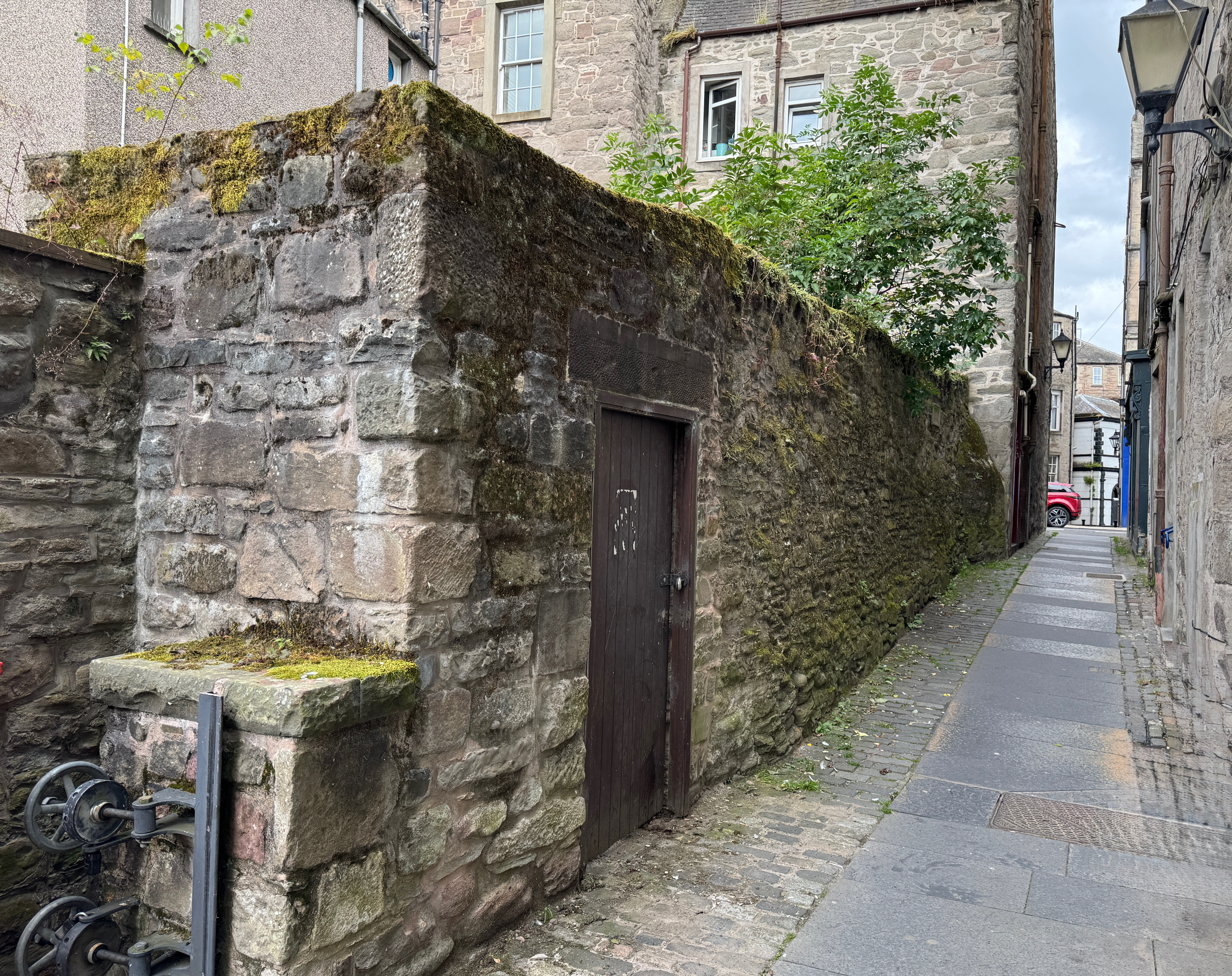
George Inn Lane, beside the hotel, features the last remaining portion of Perth's city walls

== See also ==
- List of listed buildings in Perth, Scotland
