= Huntingtower and Ruthvenfield =

Coordinates: 56.407229°N 3.502178°W

- Location within Perth and Kinross
- OS grid reference: NO074249
- Council area: Perth and Kinross
- Lieutenancy area: Perth and Kinross
- Country: Scotland
- Sovereign state: United Kingdom
- Post town: PERTH
- Postcode district: PH1
- Dialling code: 01738
- Police: Scotland
- Fire: Scottish
- Ambulance: Scottish
- UK Parliament: Perth and Kinross-shire
- Scottish Parliament: Perth; Mid Scotland and Fife

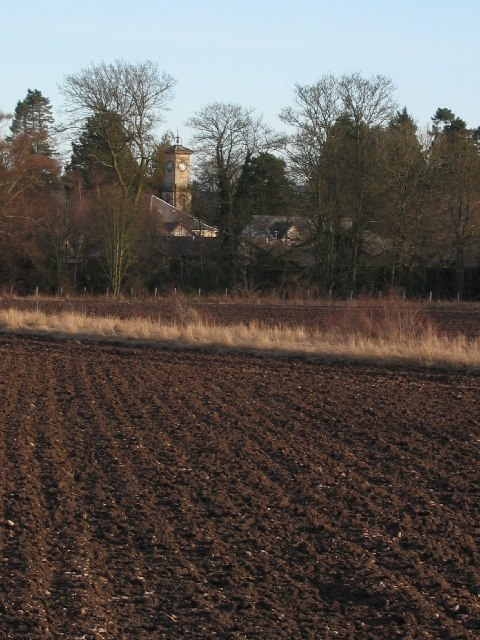
The clock tower at Huntingtower

Huntingtower and Ruthvenfield is a village in Perthshire, Scotland, on the River Almond, 3 miles (5 kilometres) northwest of Perth.

Bleaching, the chief industry, dated from 1774, when the bleaching-field was formed. By means of an old aqueduct, said to have been built by the Romans, it was provided with water from the River Almond, the properties of which rendered it especially suited for bleaching. Bleaching (by chemicals under cover, not with bleach fields) continued in Huntingtower until 1981.

Huntingtower Castle, a once formidable structure, was the scene of the Raid of Ruthven (pron. Rivven), when the Protestant lords, headed by William, 4th Lord Ruthven and 1st Earl of Gowrie (c.1541–1584), kidnapped the boy-king James VI, on 22 August 1582. The earl's sons were slain in the attempt (known as the Gowrie conspiracy) to capture James VI (1600). As a result, the Scots parliament ordered the name of Ruthven to be abolished, and the barony to be known in future as Huntingtower. The Ruthven name and reputation was re-established in 1651, by Sir Thomas Ruthven, for service to the Crown.

The source of the 4.5 mi (7.2 km)-long Perth Lade is just west of the village, at Low's Work weir on the River Almond.

== Roman History ==
As a result of excavations by the Roman Gask Project at West Mains of Huntingtower, the remains of a Roman tower were identified. This was probably the northernmost tower in the series of Roman fortifications known as the Gask Ridge during the Flavian dynasty (ca 80AD).

== Notable persons ==
George Turnbull was brought up in Huntingtower. He was the Chief Engineer building the first major Indian railway in the 1850s.
