= Perth Leisure Pool =

Leisure centre in Perth, Scotland

Coordinates: 56.3947°N 3.4427°W

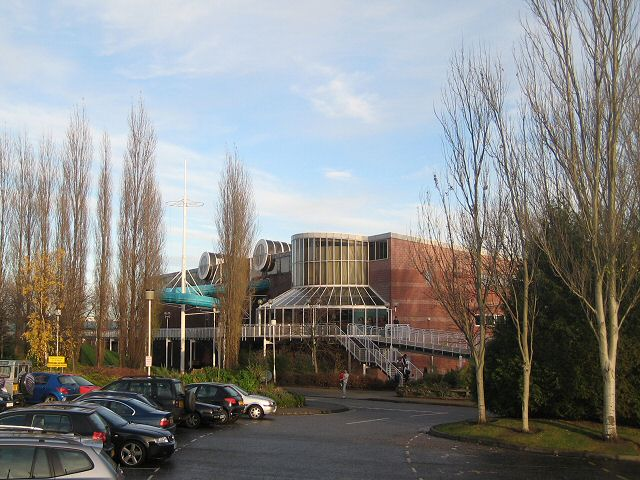
External view of the Perth Leisure Pool building

Perth Leisure Pool is the main indoor public leisure and recreation centre in the city of Perth, Scotland.

In 2006, the facility was noted for receiving more than 700,000 visitors a year. As of 2024, however, the future of Perth Leisure Pool, the adjacent Dewar's Centre and Bell's Sports Centre were in doubt, due to their losing money annually. Plans for a new sports centre, initially discussed a decade earlier, were started again.

== Development ==
Perth Leisure Pool was designed in 1984 after an architectural contest run by the RIAS and Perth Council which was won by architects FaulknerBrowns. Councillor John L. Wilson presided over the development of the facility, and it was opened by Anne, Princess Royal, on 29 July 1988.

== Facilities ==
The complex includes five swimming pools with flumes, bubble beds and other water features; a gym, health spa, cafe, creche and outdoor children's play area. The separate children's lagoon varies in depth between 1 and 2 1/2 feet (0.30 and 0.76 m).

== Cryptosporidiosis outbreak ==
In August 2002, there was an outbreak of cryptosporidiosis at the pool, which caused gastrointestinal illness for 74 people. This resulted in the closure of the facility while the matter was investigated. Numerous improvements to the cleaning and water treatment processes were recommended by the Outbreak Control Team and these were made prior to the reopening of the centre.
