= Sandeman Building =

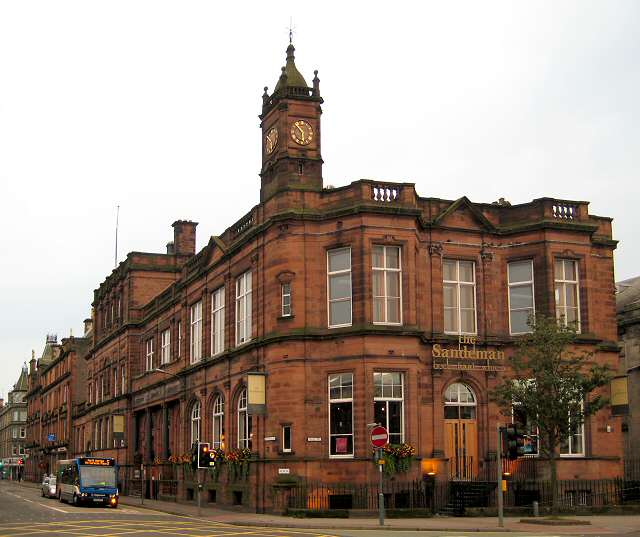
- The building in 2008, looking south along Kinnoull Street

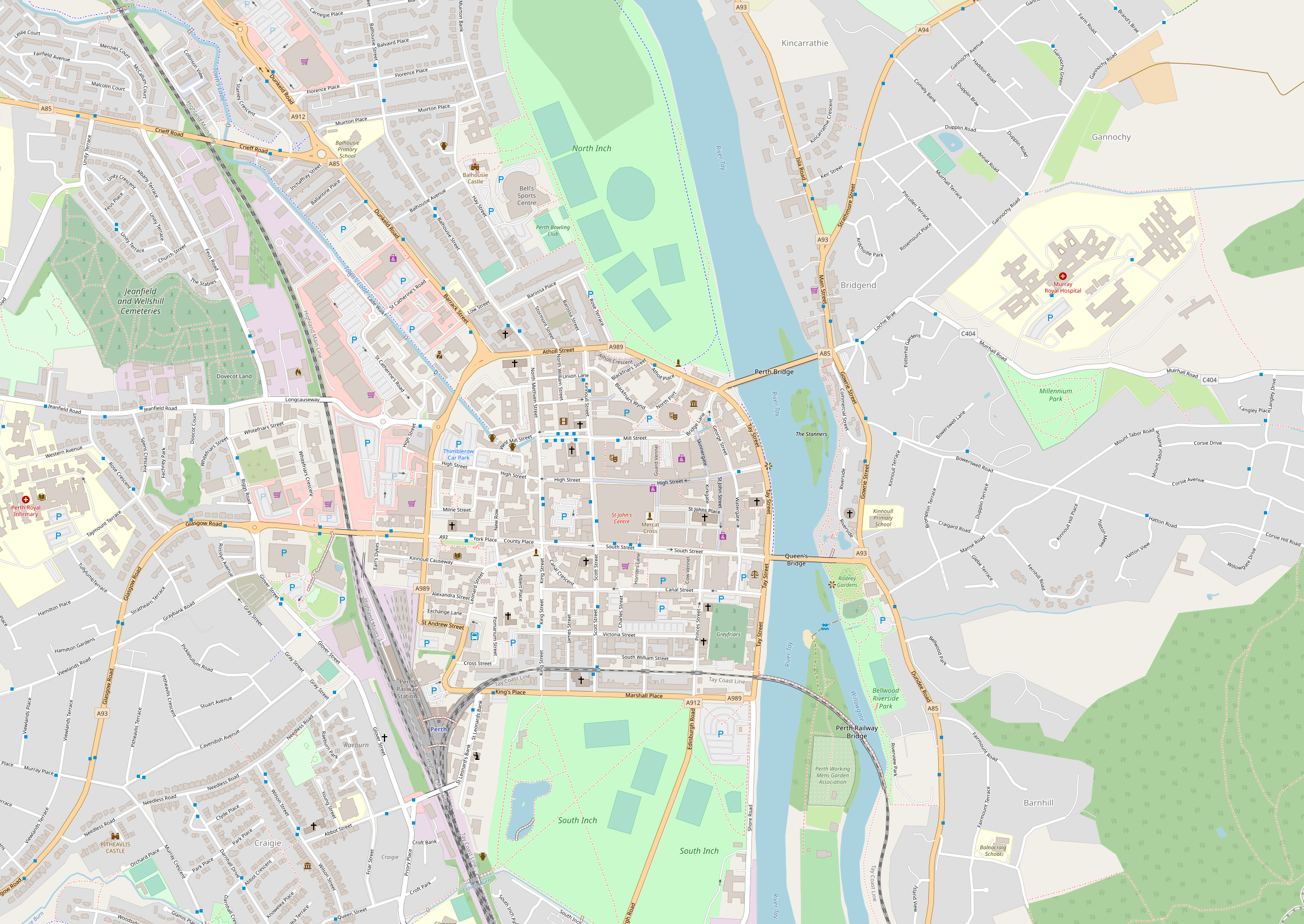
- Shown in Perth
- 56.397383°N 3.43285°W
- Location: 14–16 Kinnoull Street, Perth

History
- Built: 1898 (128 years ago)

Site notes
- Architect(s): Campbell Douglas and David Morrison

Listed Building – Category C(S)
- Designated: 26 August 1977
- Reference no.: LB39334

The Sandeman Building, formerly the Sandeman Library, is a building on Kinnoull Street in Perth, Scotland. Designed by Campbell Douglas and David Morrison, the building is Category C listed, dating to 1898. Its foundation stone was laid on 14 October 1896, with full Masonic honours, by Perth's lord provost John Dewar, 1st Baron Forteviot. It was opened on 22 October 1898 by Lord Roseberry. The building stands at the corner of Kinnoull Street and Mill Street.

Built according to a bequest from Professor Archibald Sandeman, of Queens' College, Cambridge, the former library has had its collection moved to the Sandeman Room at the A. K. Bell Library in York Place. The Sandeman Building has been a public house since around 2000.

== See also ==
- List of listed buildings in Perth, Scotland
