= Gannochy Trust =

Scottish charity

The Gannochy Trust
- Formation: 21 June 1937; 89 years ago
- Founder: Arthur Kinmond Bell
- Type: Charity
- Legal status: Registered Charity
- Purpose: To improve the quality of community life in Perth and Kinross, and for people across Scotland.
- Headquarters: Pitcullen Crescent, Perth
- Location: Scotland
- Chairman: Stephen Hay
- Chief Executive: Andy Duncan
- Key people: Trustees
- Main organ: Board of Trustees
- Staff: 14
- Website: www.gannochytrust.org.uk

The Gannochy Trust was founded in 1937 by Scottish businessman and philanthropist Arthur Kinmond Bell, known as A. K. Bell. The Trust was formed to improve the quality of community life in Perth and Kinross, and for people across Scotland.

== History ==
The Gannochy Trust was founded in 1937, by the established whisky distiller and philanthropist A.K. Bell. The founding aims of the Trust were to improve the quality of life for people living in Perth and Kinross, including maintaining the Gannochy Housing estate, providing grant funding for community based initiatives in the local area and investing in capital projects in Perth for the benefit of its citizens. The Gannochy Housing estate was built by A. K, Bell between 1925 and 1931, to a design by local architect Robert Matthew Mitchell.

== Activities ==
The Trust provides funding to improve the lives of people living in Perth and Kinross, as well projects across Scotland. The Trust funds in three year cycles, with the current Funding Strategy running between 2019 and 2022. The current Funding Strategy has three core funding objectives for Perth and Kinross:

- To improve the quality of life for people;
- To develop and inspire young people;
- To improve the availability or quality of the built and natural environment for wide community use.

The Trust also provides funding for projects across the rest of Scotland. The funding objective for the rest of Scotland is to develop and inspire young people.

The Gannochy Trust particularly provides many grants for the improvement of sports provision and participation.

In line with the original Trust Deed, the Trust also manages and rents affordable property in the Gannochy area of Perth. This includes an estate of just under 300 rented homes including a mixture of general and pensioners houses and bungalows, as well as two farms. The Trust is currently building 48 new bungalows and houses on Gannochy Road, designed to improve health, accessibility and connectedness for tenants. The Trust also manages the nearby Doo'cot Cricket Park, the Quarrymill Woodland Park, the Gannochy Community Hall, the Curly recreation ground and Gannochy Pond as places for the community to enjoy.

== Partnerships ==
The Trust has helped form a number of charitable partnerships, often in conjunction with Perth and Kinross Council, to help distribute funds to where they are needed the most.

For example, the Bell's Sports Centre (Perth) Ltd was set up to manage the centre for the citizens of Perth, which was funded by the Trust. Now known as Live Active Leisure Ltd, this body has grown to include many recreational venues across the county.

The Trust also has a close working partnership with the Perth and Kinross Countryside Trust, which helps maintain rural walkways and other local amenities, meeting the objectives of caring for the natural environment.

The Trust also works closely with the Perth and Kinross Heritage Trust, which was set up to conserve the archaeological and architectural heritage of Perth.

== Notable projects ==
=== Within Perthshire ===
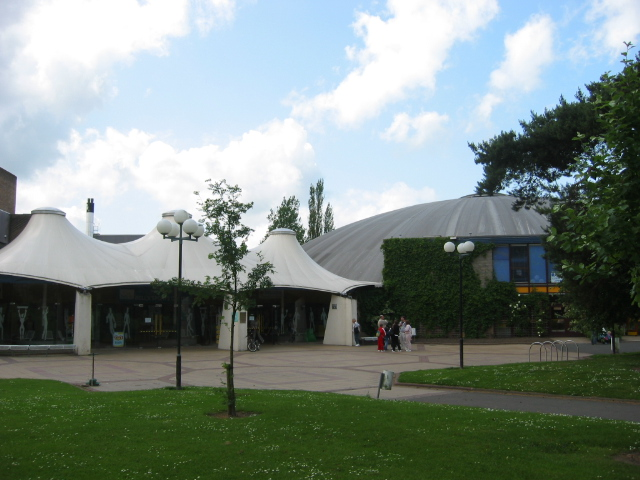
Bell's Sports Centre, 2007

In line with A K Bell's vision to improve the lives of his local community, the Gannochy Trust has played a significant role in the development of modern-day Perth, and it has been noted that some of the city's most iconic landmarks are a result of support from the Trust.

One of the Gannochy Trust's first major projects was the construction of the Bell's Sports Centre in Perth, completed in 1968. The Trust provided £225,000 towards the cost of construction. They also provided funding for refurbishments and extensions in 1972 and 1982, with the newly extended centre being renamed the Gannochy Sports Complex, although Bell's Sports Centre is still the most commonly used name.

The Trust also provided funding for the refurbishment of the Perth Theatre, which was completed in November 2017.

In 1994 it was announced that Perth's new multi-million pound library would be named the A K Bell Library. This was both in recognition of the fact that the Gannochy Trust was a major contributor to this project, as well as the large role they, and their founder A K Bell, have made to the City since its foundation. The library was formally opened in 1995.

=== Within the rest of Scotland ===
In 1967, as part of the construction of Stirling University, the Gannochy Trust provided up to £100,000 towards a sports pavilion on the campus. They have continued to support sport at the university, including funding sports bursaries in 1983, and contributing £500,000 to the Scottish National Tennis Centre in 1989.

Between 2003 and 2010, The Gannochy Trust sponsored the Royal Society of Edinburgh's ‘Gannochy Trust Innovation Award.’ This highly prestigious award was presented to under 45 year olds based in Scotland whose outstanding achievements led to major economic or social benefits to Scotland, or the wider world. This award consisted of a gold medal and £50,000 to develop the idea, and it is believed the £600,000 awarded has created £4 million of additional value to the Scottish economy.
