= Perth and Kinross Heritage Trust =

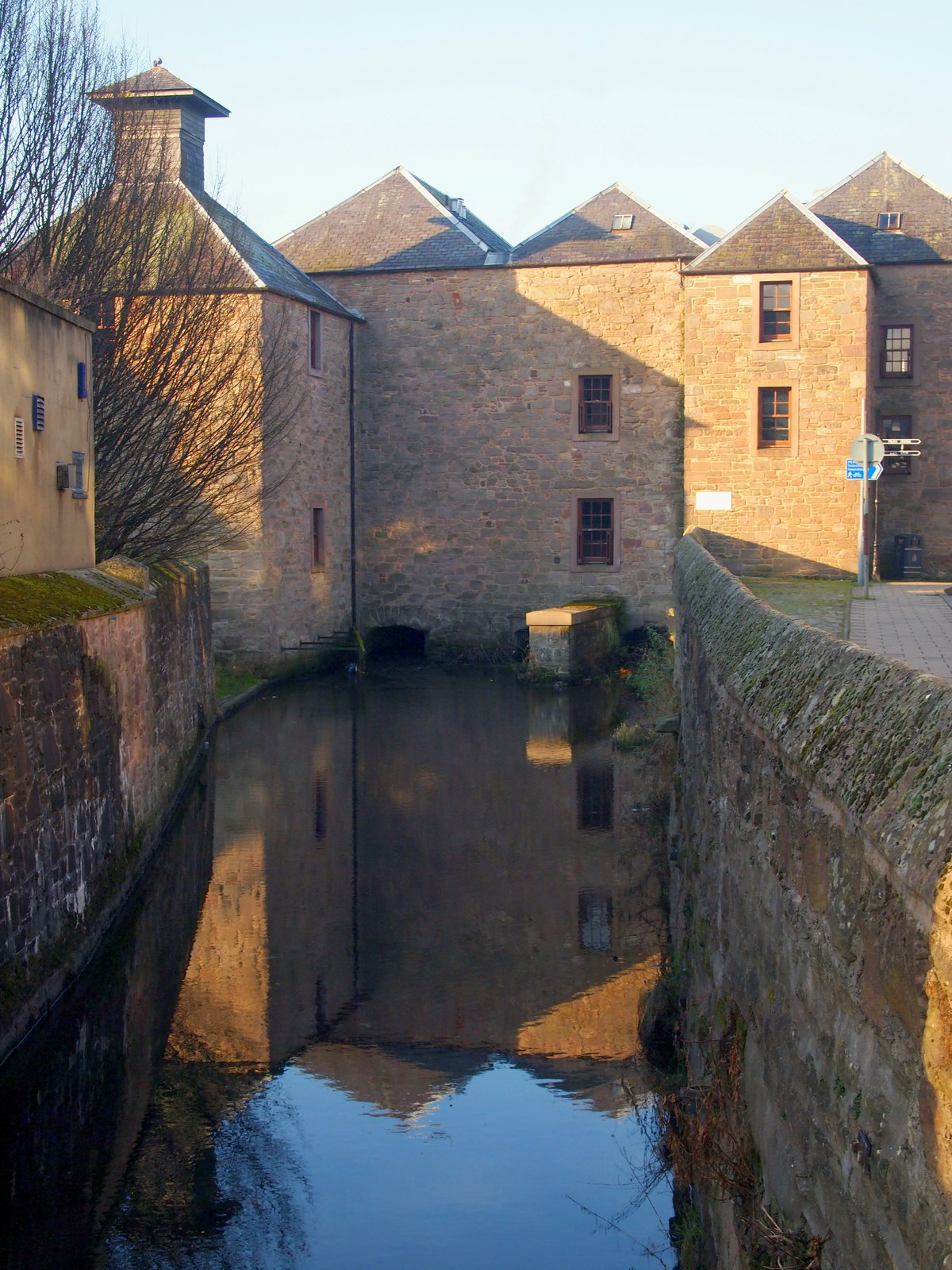
- Perth's Lower City Mills, the Trust's headquarters. Perth Lade runs beneath the property
- Abbreviation: PKHT
- Founded: 1988 (38 years ago)
- Type: Scottish Charity
- Purpose: Promoting, preserving, maintaining and enhancing the historical, architectural and constructional heritage of Perth and Kinross
- Headquarters: Lower City Mills, West Mill Street
- Location: Perth, Scotland, UK
- Region served: Perth and Kinross
- Services: Preservation
- Website: https://www.pkht.org.uk/

Perth and Kinross Heritage Trust (PKHT) is a charitable preservation organisation founded in 1988 and based in the Scottish city of Perth. It works, both independently and collaboratively, "to preserve, enhance and increase understanding of Perth and Kinross’s historic environment". It is a registered Scottish Charity, supported by Heritage Lottery Fund Transition funding.

PKHT is one of seven heritage trusts in Scotland, the others being in Inverness, Aberdeen, Dundee, Edinburgh, Glasgow and Stirling.

== Background ==
After Perth reclaimed its city status in 2012, Perth and Kinross Heritage Trust began the process of conserving the city's historic buildings and structures via the Perth City Heritage Fund (PCHF), which is funded by the Scottish Government. Its aim is to encourage owners of historic buildings within the bounds of Perth Central and Kinnoull Conservation Areas by assisting their repair and renovation work with grants.

Funds have, thus far, been received in three phases: 2012–2015, 2015–2018, and (the most recent) 2018–2021. Funding for the latter part of 2021 and 2022 is expected.

Phases 1 and 2 provided just over £1 million of grant assistance for almost fifty projects.

The following properties have benefitted from the grant:

- 1 Hospital Street, Perth (a Category B listed building, dating to the early 19th century)
- Inchbank House, Bridgend (Category B listed, dating to 1795)
- Cunningham–Graham Close, Perth (Category B listed, dating to 1699)
- 1–3 George Street, Perth (Category C listed, dating to 1780)
- 31B–37 High Street (Category B listed, dating to the late 18th century)

Also, John Buchan's House, a Category C listed double villa at 18–20 York Place, was restored. It was the birthplace of John Buchan, 1st Baron Tweedsmuir, in 1875 and was later the manse of the Knox Free Church.
