= Arthur Kinmond Bell =

Scottish whisky distiller and philanthropist

Arthur K. Bell
- Arthur K. Bell, pictured around 1930
- Born: 4 October 1868; Craigie, Perth, Scotland
- Died: 26 April 1942 (aged 73); Campsie Hill, Perth, Scotland
- Other names: AK Bell
- Occupation: distiller
- Years active: 1895–1942
- Known for: Former owner of Arthur Bell & Sons Ltd, and founder of the Gannochy Trust.
- Spouse: Camilla Bruce (married 1899–1942)
- Parent: Arthur Bell

Arthur Kinmond Bell, also known as AK Bell, (4 October 1868 – 16 April 1942) was a Scottish distiller, working as a partner of Arthur Bell & Sons Ltd, and as a philanthropist, founding the Gannochy Trust to help support the people of his home city of Perth.

== Birth and family life ==
Born on 4 October 1868 at Moncreiffe Terrace, Craigie, Perth, Bell resided within Perth for much of his life. Educated first at Perth Academy, he later moved to Edinburgh continuing his studies at Craigmount School.

In 1899 Bell married Miss Camilla Bruce. The ceremony was conducted in her native city of Edinburgh, but with her in her late 30s at the time of the marriage, a life without children seemed probable. It has been speculated that this contributed to his desire to make a lasting mark, leading to his philanthropy.

== Career ==
Bell joined the family business as a partner in 1895, following in the path of his father and grandfather. He quickly made his mark, and along with his brother, Robert, succeeded in doubling the company's profits before his father's death in 1900. At this time Bell, as the eldest son, became managing director, and continued to expand the business despite the setbacks of the Great Depression and Prohibition in the United States, becoming governor director in 1921 when the company became a limited company. This expansion was achieved in large part through the use of advertising and agents, many of whom were members of his extended family living throughout the empire, and included the friendly takeover of three distilleries between 1933 and 1936. By the time of Bell's death in 1942, the company's profits were in excess of £100,000 per annum.

Later in his life, Bell saved the Perth linen industry by financially backing the one remaining company, John Shields and Co. intervening at the request of the Lord Provost Robert Nimmo. The apparent and imminent closure of this company came as a shock to the local council, and the loss of 300 jobs would have been a blow to the city,. For his contribution Bell receiving the Freedom of Perth, and the workers of the company presented him with a parchment tribute as a thanks for his part in turning the company into a successful and growing enterprise. Following his purchase of the company, Bell reconstructed the firm and re-equipped it for artificial fibre production, helping to secure the business into the future.

== Philanthropic activities ==
After a man has a roof over his head and his bread and butter is fairly well assured and has a surplus, I think you will agree with me that it is only common sense that he should spend part of that surplus for the benefit of his native city.

— Arthur Kinmond Bell

This quotation from Bell's acceptance of the Freedom of Perth sums up his approach to philanthropy, and how as a beneficiary of the then booming Scotch whisky trade, Bell prospered and was able to look to benefit his home city. His first major project in this direction was the building of the Gannochy Housing Estate between 1924 and 1932. This model housing scheme was intended to benefit the hardworking of a younger generation, who had survived the harshness of war and were now looking to better themselves, with many of the original tenancies being granted to workers of Bell & Sons.

His next major project was the establishment of the Gannochy Trust in 1937, founded partly to maintain the Gannochy estate and partly to ensure the continuing improvement of his native city into the future, even after his death.

After housing, the other major concern for post-war Perth was the supply of clean water, with the River Tay becoming increasingly polluted. In answer to this problem Bell provided shares in Bell's Whisky to the Gannochy Trust for the purpose of establishing Sewage treatment works for Perth and the surrounding villages, having previously commissioned a survey of what needed to be done to improve the situation in 1925. In total the trust was able to provide £640,000 towards the projects, with the one in Perth being completed in 1971.

== Recognition ==
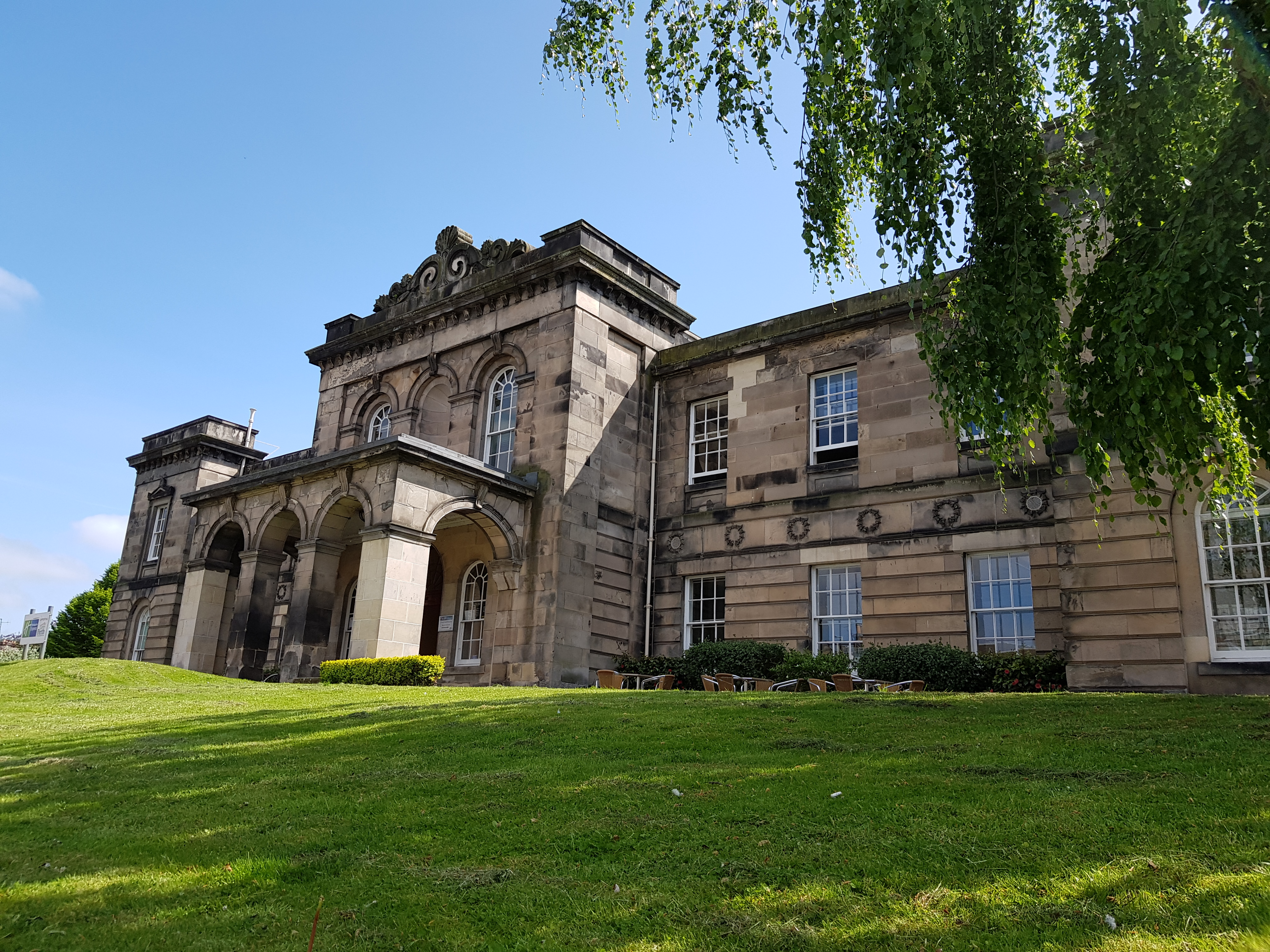
A. K. Bell Library, on York Place

In contrast to many of his local contemporaries, such as John Dewar, 1st Baron Forteviot, and Robert Pullar, Bell received comparatively few public honours for his philanthropic activities during his life. One distinction he did receive, on 18 March 1938, was the Freedom of Perth, which he described as his greatest honour. This honour was granted primarily for his role in saving John Shields and Co. rather than for any of his philanthropic activities, which appear to have been done quietly and gone without any major public awareness during his life, a fact he would likely have been grateful for.

In 1994, the decision was taken to name Perth's new multi-million-pound library the A. K. Bell Library in honour of the man who had played such a large part in the city's history and whose legacy has had such a large impact on the city. The library officially opened in 1995.

== Death ==
Arthur Kinmond Bell died unexpectedly of illness on 26 April 1942. His will, though, proved him to be as generous in death as he was in life, gifting to three senior employees of Arthur Bell and Sons the sum of £5000, to all staff with ten years experience in the company, £500, and to his gardeners, chauffeurs, and servants in his employ for ten years or more, £200, all significant amounts for those who benefitted.

At the time of his death Bell was living in Kincarrathie House, Perth, with his wife. On her death in 1959, Camilla bequeathed the house to the Trust. The independent Kincarrathie Trust was set up in 1960, and now runs the house as a retirement home.
