= Hillyland =

Area of Perth, Scotland

Coordinates: 56.4033670°N 3.4807714°W

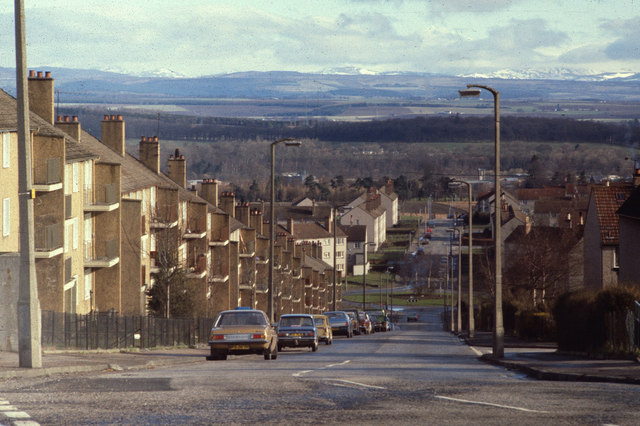
- Looking north along Newhouse Road in 1979, when the area was the western extremity of Perth's small urban sprawl. Hillyland occupies the area immediately to the west of this view

- Location within Perth and Kinross
- OS grid reference: NO08532433
- Council area: Perth and Kinross
- Lieutenancy area: Perth and Kinross
- Country: Scotland
- Sovereign state: United Kingdom
- Post town: PERTH
- Postcode district: PH1
- Dialling code: 01738
- Police: Scotland
- Fire: Scottish
- Ambulance: Scottish
- UK Parliament: Perth and Kinross-shire
- Scottish Parliament: Perthshire South and Kinross-shire

Hillyland is a suburban area of Perth, Scotland, approximately 2.0 miles (3.2 km) west-northwest of the centre of Perth. It borders Tulloch, which is located to the north and northeast. Newhouse Road separates Hillyland from Letham to the east.

Hillyland lies immediately to the east of the A9 and south of the A85 (Crieff Road). As its name suggests, the area is centred on a hill, which is 55.8 metres (183 ft) at its highest point.

In 1909, city reports described a "special drainage district" called Tulloch and Hillyland.

== Hillyland Farm ==
Morris Young Ltd., a haulage company, was located in the wedge of land between Crieff and Tulloch Roads between 1952 and 2020. Its lorry fleet was visible parked atop the hill located at the former Hillyland Farm, from which the area grew. Now-demolished dwellings for the farm workers were pictured in a 1904 issue of The Architect and Contract Reporter. Robert Henderson was the farmer in 1897.

A southwesterly view of the former homes of the workers of Hillyland Farm, both of which no longer exist

Northeasterly view

== Map ==
A map of 1832 Perth, by James Gardner, showing a "few houses" in Hillyland, which then also occupied the area of today's Tulloch
