= Lewis Petit des Etans =

Brigadier-General Lewis Petit des Etans
- Born: c. 1665; Normandy, France
- Died: 1720 Naples

Lewis Petit des Etans (c. 1665 – 1720) was a French-born military engineer and brigadier-general in the British Army.

== Life ==
His family was from near Caen, but he had to flee to England when the Edict of Nantes was revoked in 1685. From 1691 to 1692 he served as an engineer in the army train during the Williamite War in Ireland. Next he formed part of the ordnance train which embarked on abortive raids on the French coast in 1692 and 1693. The train was then landed at Ostend after the Battle of Landen and put under Charles Schomberg, with whom it helped capture Veurne, Diksmuide and Ghent. A permanent train was formed after the 1697 Treaty of Ryswick, but Petit was one of many train engineers placed on half-pay instead of being appointed to it. He rejoined the train in 1699 and joined the attempted capture of Cadiz in 1702. Petit reconnoitred the landing site and took an active part in the Battle of Vigo Bay. Next he was sent to Portugal under Schomberg and later the Earl of Galway, fighting in the campaign against James, Duke of Berwick. He was captured at Portalegre but then exchanged. He was therefore able to join the train to reinforce Gibraltar, captured in 1703 by Rooke – this train enabled the Allies to lift the Spanish siege in April 1705.

Petit was then made chief engineer of the ordnance train sent to assist the Earl of Peterborough in capturing Barcelona. Petit embarked from Gibraltar on 28 July 1705 on ships commanded by Sir Cloudesley Shovell and landed his troops at Barcelona on 22 August. The city surrendered on 4 October, mainly thanks to siege batteries set up by Petit. He improved the city's defences and was still there in April 1706 was it was surrounded by the Spanish by land and sea. He held out until the siege was raised on 8 May by Sir John Leake and his squadron. Petit was promoted colonel and took part in the battle of Almanza before preparing Tortosa for a siege, though he was unable to hold it against the Duke of Orleans and surrendered on 10 July 1708. He was quickly the subject of another prisoner exchange and became chief engineer to General Stanhope on the Minorca Expedition of August 1708, capturing Port Mahon and being appointed governor of its citadel and lieutenant-governor of the island. Apart from a brief spell back in Spain from 1709 to 1710, he then remained in Minorca until 1713.

When peace came he was put in charge of a home establishment of engineers and then in September 1714 assigned to Scotland to assist General Maitland against a threatened rising by the Highland Clans. He also ordered to report on the works at Fort William, Dumbarton and other fortifications in western Scotland. He went by land but the train under his command could not get out of the Thames Estuary due to an adverse wind. Petit was thus ordered to improvise a train from the gunners and cannon already in Stirling Castle, Edinburgh Castle and Berwick-upon-Tweed. The rebellion was soon suppressed and Petit marched to Fort William, where he surveyed the land at the head of Loch Ness for a fort. His final appointment was as chief engineer and commander in chief of the ordnance office at Port Mahon from 1716 to 1720, with his son captain Robert Petit des Etans a captain and engineer under him. He briefly returned to Britain in 1717, where he designed four barrack blocks in Scotland and finally went to Italy for his health in 1720 – he died and was buried in Naples. He was an ancestor of John Louis Petit.

== Sources ==
- This article incorporates text from a publication now in the public domain: Vetch, Robert Hamilton (1896). "Petit des Etans, Lewis". Dictionary of National Biography. Vol. 45. pp. 82–84.
