= Roland Walter Lines =

English architect (1877–1916)

- Born: 14 March 1877; Aldbury, Hertfordshire, England
- Died: 9 September 1916 (aged 39)
- Occupation: Architect
- Awards: Fellow of the Royal Institute of British Architects

Roland Walter Lines FRIBA (14 March 1877 – 9 September 1916) was an English architect who became prolific after his emigration to Edmonton, Canada, in 1906. He served as a lieutenant with the Canadian Expeditionary Force in World War I. He died in active service in 1916, aged 39.

== Early life and career ==
Lines was born in Aldbury, Hertfordshire, on 14 March 1877, a son of John and Mary.

He emigrated to Edmonton, Canada, in 1906. There, he designed several buildings, as well as a golf course.

In 1911, Donald Alexander Stewart emigrated to Edmonton from Perthshire, Scotland. He worked for Lines for a period after his arrival. Stewart returned to Scotland on war service in 1916.

Lines was elected a fellow of the Royal Institute of British Architects in 1914.

=== Selected notable works ===
Below are some of Lines' works. He died while the construction of St. Joseph's Cathedral was in progress. It was completed in 1924.

- Strathcona High School, Edmonton 1908
- Edmonton City Power Station, 1910
- Hotel Cecil, Edmonton, 1910 (major addition)
- Canada Permanent Building, Edmonton, 1910
- North-West Mounted Police Station, Edmonton, 1910 (residence for the superintendent)
- Union Bank, Edmonton, 1910
- Victoria High School, Edmonton, 1911
- Northern Hotel, Edmonton, 1911
- Royal Alexandra Hospital, Edmonton, 1912 (additions)
- North-West Mounted Police headquarters, Edmonton 1913
- Edmonton Country Club clubhouse, 1913
- Bank of British North America Building, Edmonton, 1914
- St. Joseph's Cathedral, Edmonton, 1917 (began)

== Death ==
Lines died on 9 September 1916, aged 39, during service in World War I. A lieutenant, he is interred at the Albert Communal Cemetery Extension in the Somme, France.
