= River Almond, Perth and Kinross =

River in Perth and Kinross, Scotland

Coordinates: 56.42382°N 3.46215°W

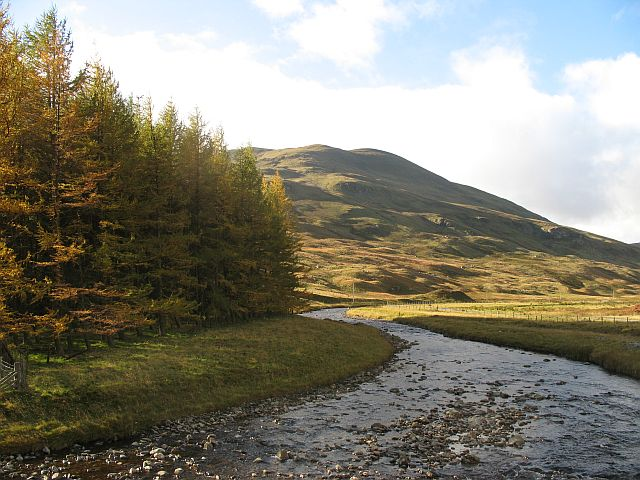
River Almond near Larichlaura

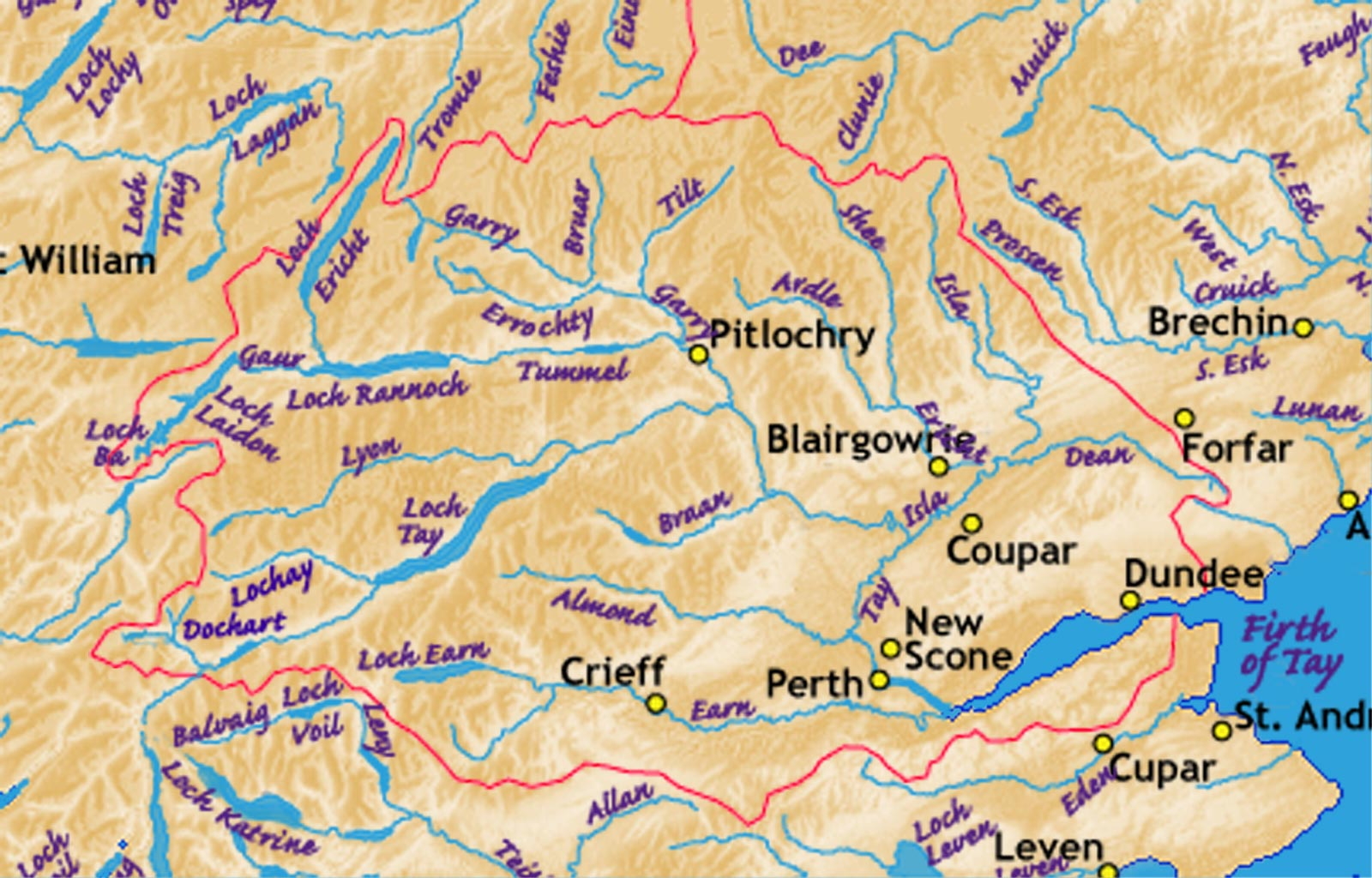
The River Almond within the River Tay catchment

The River Almond (Scottish Gaelic: Uisge Amain) is a tributary of the River Tay in Perth and Kinross, Scotland. It rises in the hills to the south-east of Loch Tay, and flows eastwards through Glenalmond. It also runs through the village of Almondbank, before joining the Tay immediately north of Perth. The river's course is around 48 kilometres (30 mi) long.

The Inveralmond Brewery and Industrial Estate of the same name are situated near the mouth of the Almond where it joins the Tay north of Perth.
