= J. Pullar and Sons =

Scottish dyeworks

J. Pullar and Sons Ltd.
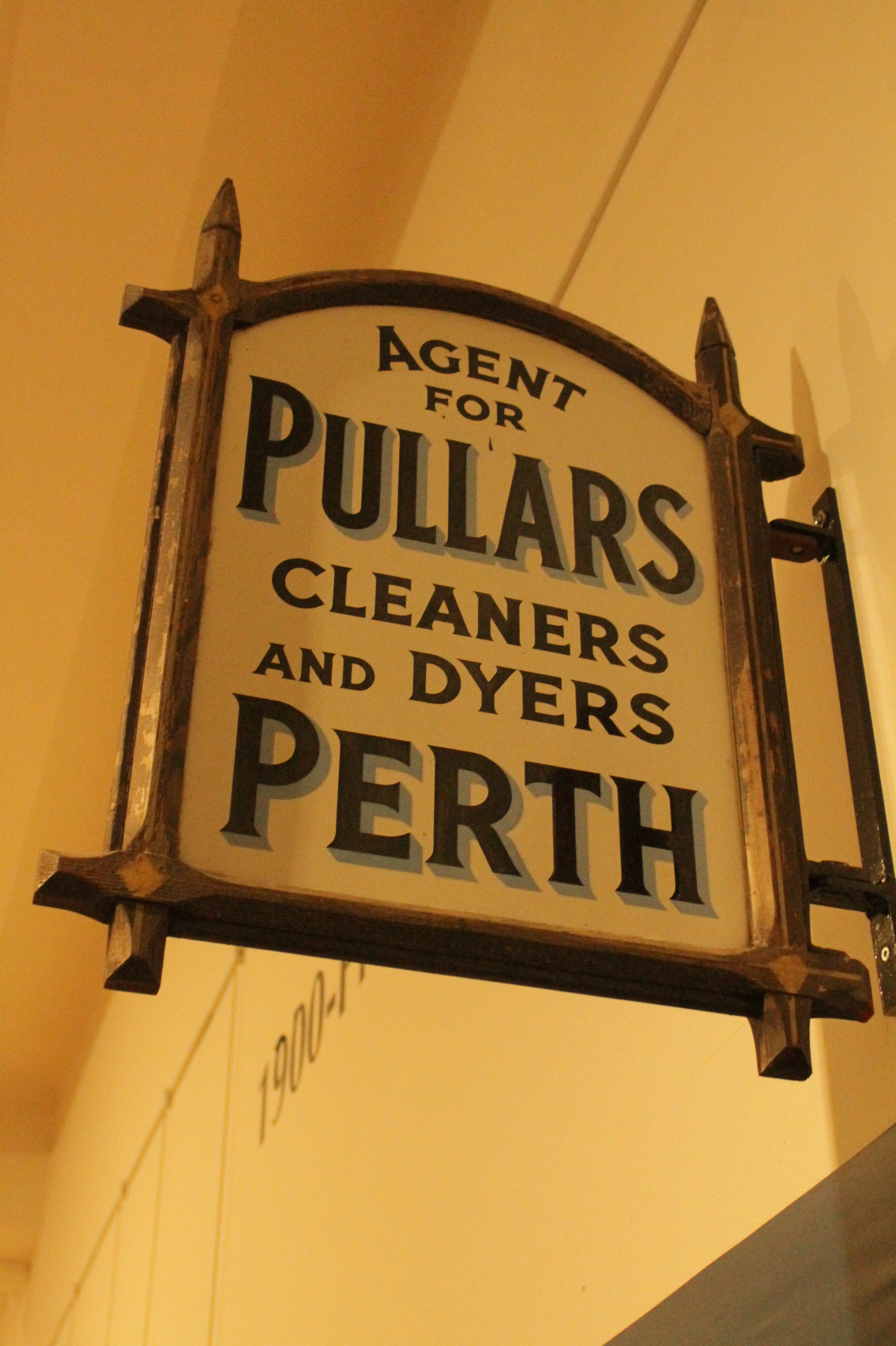
- Shop sign for Pullars of Perth on display at Perth Museum and Art Gallery
- Company type: Limited liability company
- Industry: Dyeing, dry cleaning
- Founded: 1824 (202 years ago)
- Founder: John Pullar
- Headquarters: Perth, Scotland, UK
- Area served: United Kingdom

J. Pullar and Sons Ltd. (also known as J. & J. Pullar and Pullars of Perth) was a dyeworks based in Perth, Scotland. It was founded by John Pullar in 1824 in Perth's Little Pomarium district and pioneered the first synthetic dyes. Pullars of Perth signs eventually appeared outside 7,552 agents across Britain.

When the company began in 1824, at its premises in Burt's Close, it had six employees. Initially, the company dyed cloth for Pullar's father's clothing company but also provided dyeing and laundry services for the public.

The company relocated to 36 Mill Street, in the centre of Perth, in 1828, and benefitted from the arrival of trains around fifteen years later.

New premises were established on Kinnoull Street in 1848.

In 1851, the company exhibited at the Great Exhibition in London and received the patronage of Queen Victoria the following year, thereafter being by appointment to the Queen.

In 1865, the premises on Mill Street were rebuilt and named North British Dyeworks. The building stands today as Pullar House, the home of Perth and Kinross Council.

In 1867, Pullars became the first dry cleaning business in Scotland. (Pullar's daughter-in-law Adelgunde Spindler was the daughter of Wilhelm Spindler, who invented the benzene method of dry cleaning.)

A large works was established in the Tulloch area of Perth in 1883. Bracken Brae occupies this site today.

John Pullar died in 1878, aged 75.

Conflict between the family and the unions contributed the company's gradual decline. It was taken over by Eastman of London in 1917, but it kept trading as J. Pullar & Sons, Dryers & Cleaners. Reconstruction of the dyeworks was carried out, to a design by Robert Matthew Mitchell.

Another company, Perth Dyeworks, was in operation in the early 20th century. Located on Dunkeld Road, it was owned by P. & P. Campbell.

== Gallery ==
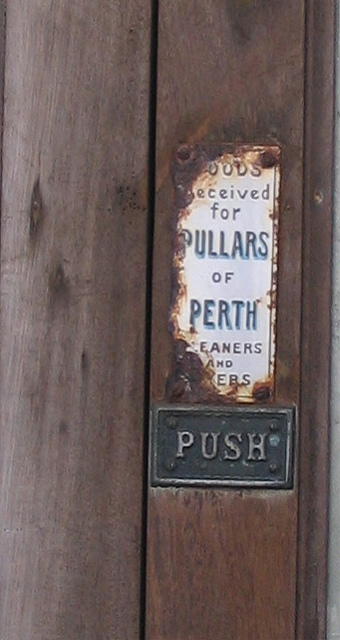
This plate, on the door of the Morris & Son's General Cambrian Establishment Drapers in High Street, Barmouth, Wales, reads 'Goods received for Pullars of Perth cleaners and dyers'

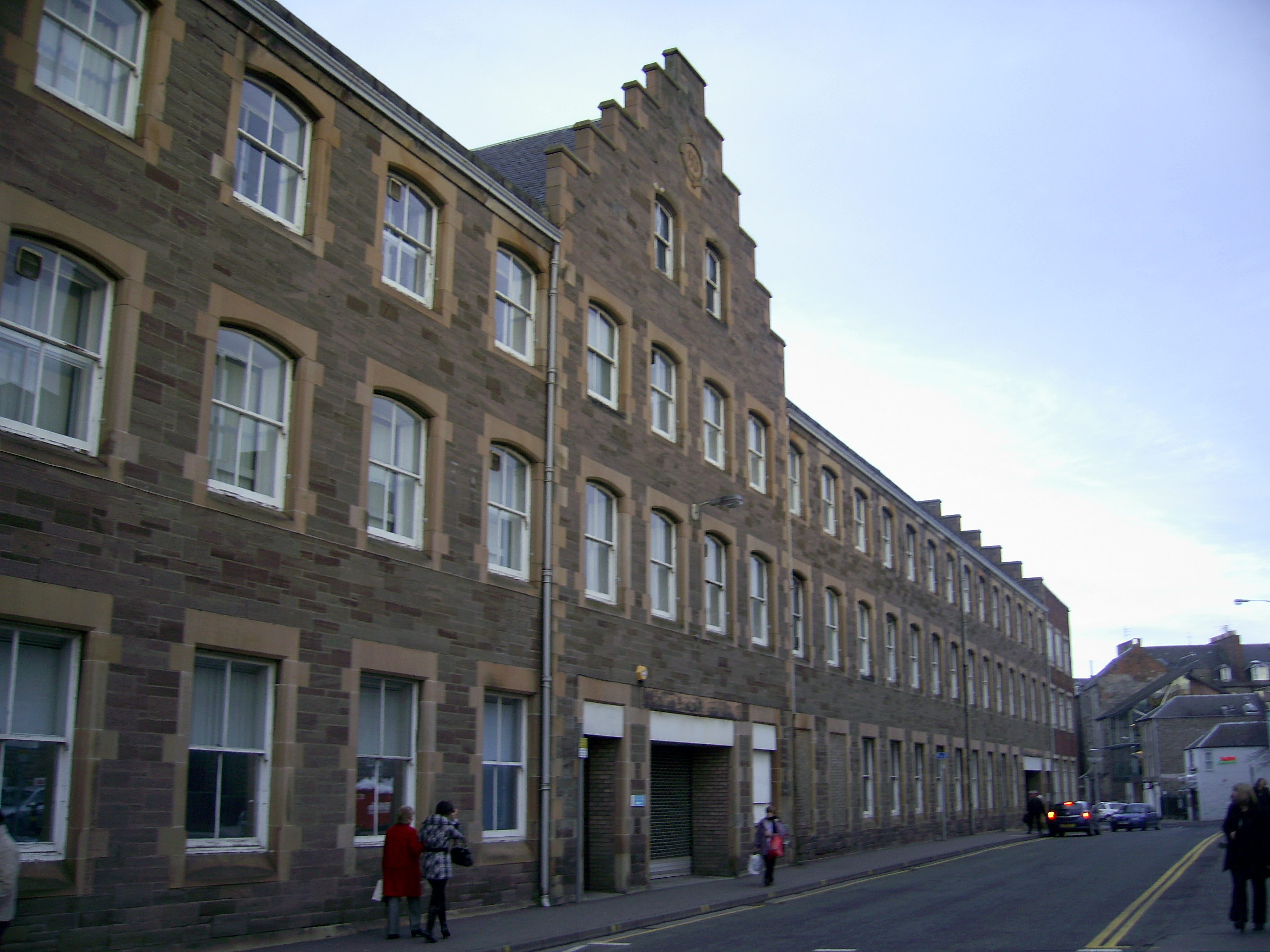
Pullar's former Mill Street building

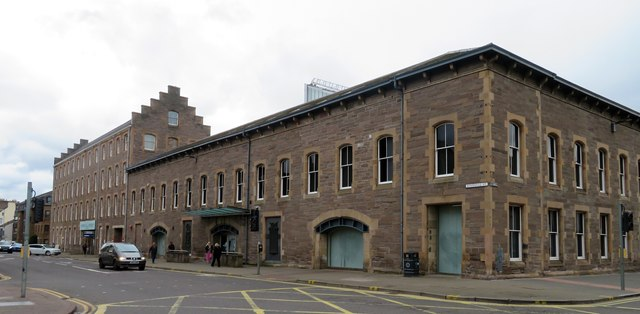
Kinnoull Street elevation
