= James Gardner (surveyor) =

English surveyor, lithographer, cartographer

- Occupations: surveyor, lithographer, cartographer, engraver, publisher

James Gardner FRGS was an English surveyor, lithographer, cartographer, engraver and publisher who played an active role in the trigonometrical survey of Great Britain. His career spanned the years 1808 to 1840.

== Career ==
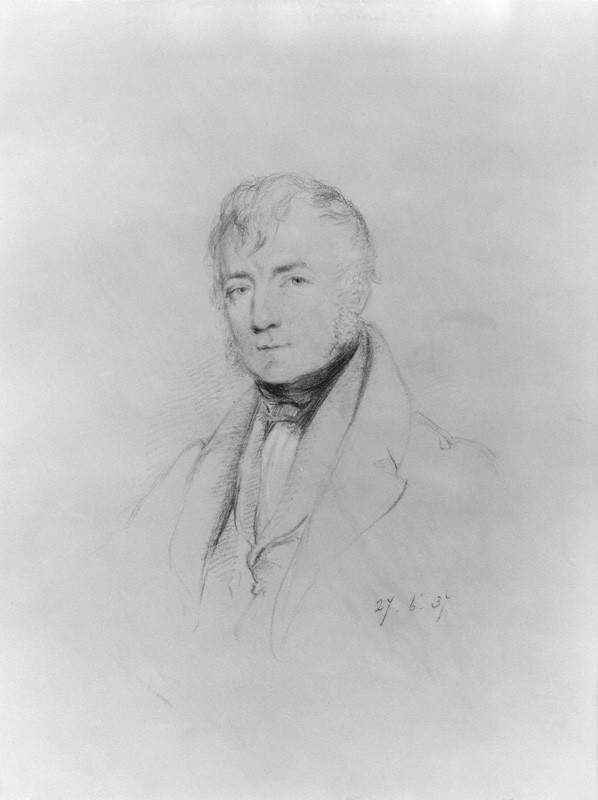
Gardner was chief assistant to Captain Thomas Colby from 1819

Colonel William Mudge appointed Gardner as a surveyor in 1808, on the recommendation of civil engineer John Rennie.

With his 36-inch theodolite, he began working on the triangulation of northern England and the Scottish Borders.

From 1813 to 1818, Gardner triangulated from the Mull of Kintyre to the Moray Firth, sometimes working with Captain Thomas Colby, before beginning on the secondary triangulation of the counties of England.

In 1818, he observed a panorama of the Grampians, published two years later.

In 1821, he spent a year on the re-triangulation between Greenwich and Paris. For this, Colby (now superintendent of the Ordnance Survey) and Captain Henry Kater were the joint commissioners for Britain. Of Gardner, Kater later wrote: "to the talents, zeal, and exertions of that gentleman, on various occasions of difficulty, we were very much indebted".

After the unexpected death of Simon Woolcot in 1819, Gardner was appointed as Colby's senior assistant.

=== Ordnance Survey role ===
In 1823, Colby recommended Gardner succeed William Faden as official map-seller to the Ordnance Survey (OS), stipulating that Gardner would not sell maps which competed with that of OS, which had previously been an issue. He was due to remain in the role for two years, but in 1825 Colby advised the Ordnance Board that Gardner's services would be needed for longer. Colby was asked how long he thought the services of his assistant would need to be retained, but this request was, it seems, overlooked for nine years, during which time Gardner was being paid £105 per annum "for occasional computations". The board considered the services performed by Gardner for this salary to be almost nominal and, as such, proposed that it be stopped.

By 1823, Gardner had three roles: "Ordnance Survey computer, sole agent for the sale of its maps, and map-seller and/or cartographer of non-competing maps".

His first and most ambitious map was that of the Western Hemisphere and Eastern Hemisphere in 1825, each 48 inches (120 cm) in diameter. It was in a similar format to Aaron Arrowsmith's 1808 map, but updated, corrected and enlarged.

A careful comparison of this left this writer spellbound both by the coverage of Arrowsmith's map, and by the quality of Gardner's modifications, including his notes documenting subsequent exploration.

— David L. Walker, 2014

Gardner, with Colby, was one of the founding members of the Royal Geographical Society in 1830.

=== Engraver ===
Also in the 1830s, the Reform Act 1832 and the Municipal Corporations Act 1835 established a need to define constituency boundaries. It was then that James Gardner was first named as a map engraver, possibly under the patronage of his Ordnance Survey colleagues.

=== Resignation and semi-retirement ===
Gardner left his role at the Ordnance Board in 1840, also leaving his Regent Street home office. He was succeeded by John Arrowsmith in Soho Square and Grattan & Gilbert in Paternoster Row.

He became semi-retired, and his son managed their map-selling business for the next decade.

== Gallery of maps ==
Perth, Scotland (1832)

== Personal life ==
Gardner is known to have had at least one child — son James Gardner Jr.

With his appointment to Ordnance Survey in 1823, Gardner was given an allowance of £100 per year for three years. His contract required Gardner to find a home and a "handsome shop" in London's West End. His shop was at 163 Regent Street, moving to 33 Brewer Street in Golden Square upon retirement in 1840.
