= St Mary's Monastery, Kinnoull =

Monastery in Kinnoull, Perth, Scotland

St Mary's Monastery
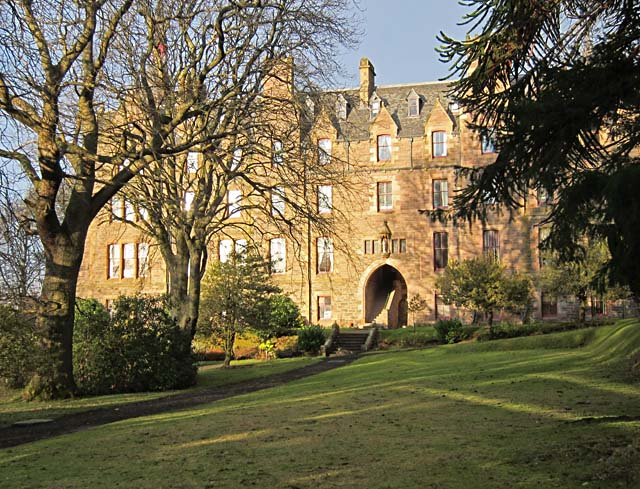

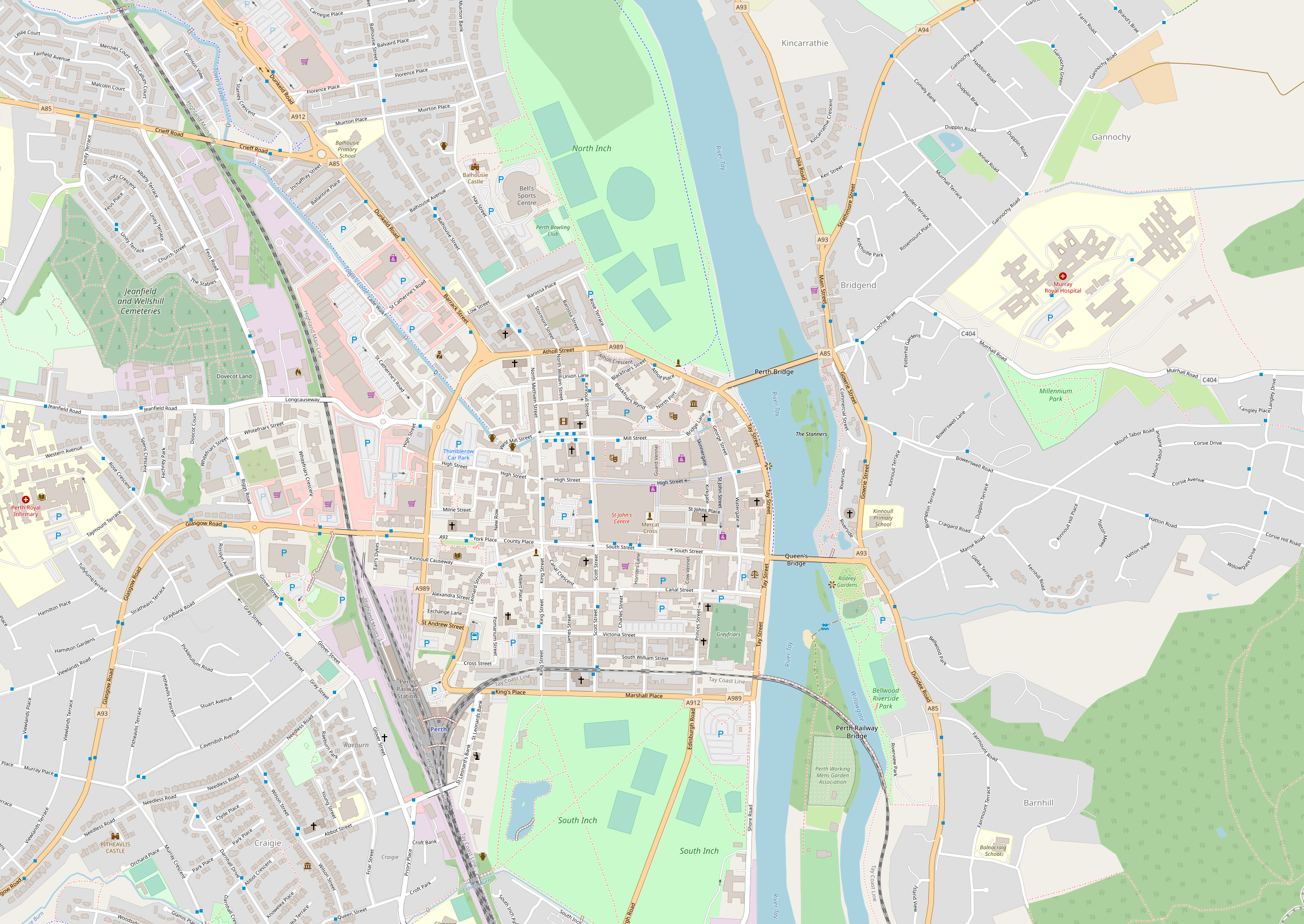
- Location within Perth
- Interactive map of St Mary's Monastery

Monastery information
- Order: Redemptorists
- Denomination: Catholic
- Dedication: Our Lady of Perpetual Help
- Consecrated: 29 November 1913

Architecture
- Functional status: Active
- Heritage designation: Category B
- Designated date: 20 May 1965
- Architect: Andrew Heiton
- Groundbreaking: 16 June 1868
- Completion date: 19 March 1869

Site
- Location: Kinnoull, Perth, Scotland
- Country: United Kingdom
- Coordinates: 56.39448°N 3.40965°W
- Website: KinnoullMonastery.co.uk

St Mary's Monastery is a Christian spirituality and retreat centre in Kinnoull, Perth, Scotland. It was built in 1868 by the Redemptorists. Until 1971, it also served as a novitiate for the Redemptorists. In 1870, the church and shrine, Our Lady of Perpetual Help, was built within the grounds. It is located on Hatton Road, to the east of Kinnoull, on the edge of Kinnoull Hill, overlooking the city of Perth. The building has been registered as a category B listed building by Historic Environment Scotland, and was the first Roman Catholic monastery established in Scotland since the Reformation.

== History ==
=== Foundation ===
The monastery is in view in the distance, below Kinnoull Hill, in this circa-1903 view of Bridgend

On 21 May 1866, the land for the monastery was bought from William Hay, 4th Earl of Kinnoull. On 16 June 1868, the foundation stone was laid. It was blessed by the Archbishop of St Andrews and Edinburgh John Strain. The building was designed by a local architect Andrew Heiton. He designed many buildings in Perth and abroad, such as Vogrie House, the Perth Municipal Buildings, and Abbey Presbyterian Church, Dublin. His students included James Macintyre Henry and John Murray Robertson, and he worked with his nephew, Andrew Granger Heiton.

=== Construction ===
The purchase of the land and the construction was funded by the family of a Redemptorist priest, Edward Douglas. On 19 May 1869, construction was finished and the community moved in. The church, dedicated to Our Lady of Perpetual Help, continued to be built and was opened on 22 March 1870. On 29 November 1913 it was consecrated by the Bishop of Dunkeld Robert Fraser. The monastery hosted retreats, was a centre from which Redemptorist priests went to nearby Catholic parishes and was a novitiate, a place of training for Redemptorist novices.

=== Developments ===
In 1896, extension work to the monastery and church took place. A new oratory and clock tower were added. They were designed by Andrew Granger Heiton, the nephew of the original architect. In the church is a mortuary chapel, a crypt and a Father Willis Organ. After the 1970s, it was no longer used as a novitiate. In 1978, it began hosting retreats for women. In 1981, it was designated a mission and renewal centre, making retreats its primary focus. In the 2000s, a renovation of the entire building was done and it was reopened in 2017.

== See also ==
- List of listed buildings in Perth, Scotland
- Catholic Church in Scotland
- List of monastic houses in Scotland
