= Andrew Granger Heiton =

Scottish architect, c. 1862–1927

- Born: c. 1862; Pitcur, Perthshire, Scotland
- Died: 11 June 1927 (aged 65 or 66); Harrogate, North Yorkshire, England
- Occupation: Architect

Andrew Granger Heiton (born Andrew Heiton Granger; c. 1862 – 11 June 1927) was a Scottish architect. He was prominent in the late 19th and early 20th centuries. Several of his works are now listed structures.

== Early life ==
Andrew Heiton Granger was born around 1862, the son of John Granger, a farmer in Pitcur, Perthshire. He was educated at Perth Academy and Fettes College.

== Career ==
Granger was articled to his uncle, Andrew Heiton, in 1876, became his assistant in the early 1880s, and eventually his partner.

Heiton became semi-retired around 1891, and Granger took over the practice.

Heiton died, of a suspected stroke, in 1894. Upon inheriting the business and the estate, Granger reversed his middle and last name, becoming Andrew Granger Heiton.

After serving in the First World War, Heiton had trouble producing drawings for clients due to health issues. He formed a partnership with John Sibbald McKay, who had previously worked as his assistant between 1913 and 1915. McKay continued the practice after Heiton's death.

=== Notable works ===
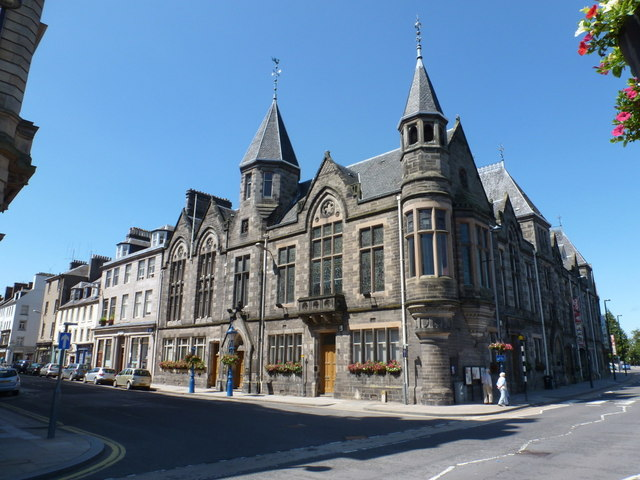
Municipal Buildings, Perth

- St Andrew's Church, Perth (1884) – now Category C listed
- Alyth Town Hall, Alyth (1887)
- Caledonian Road Primary School, Perth (1890) – now Category B listed
- St Paul's Church, Perth (1890; organ loft and alterations) – now Category B listed
- St John the Baptist Scottish Episcopalian Church, Perth (1892; restoration) – now Category B listed
  - St John the Baptist Scottish Episcopalian Church, Perth (1914; addition)
- St John the Baptist Episcopalian Church, Perth (1892; reconstruction) – now Category C listed
- Municipal Buildings, Perth (1895; rebuilding and extension after fire) – now Category B listed
- St Mary's Monastery, Kinnoull (1895; southern novices' range) – now Category B listed
  - St Mary's Monastery, Kinnoull (1897; oratory additions)
- Old Academy, Perth (1907; additions) – now Category A listed
- Guildhall, Perth (1908) – now Category B listed
- Kirkcaldy War Memorial, Kirkcaldy (1923) – now Category B listed

== Personal life ==
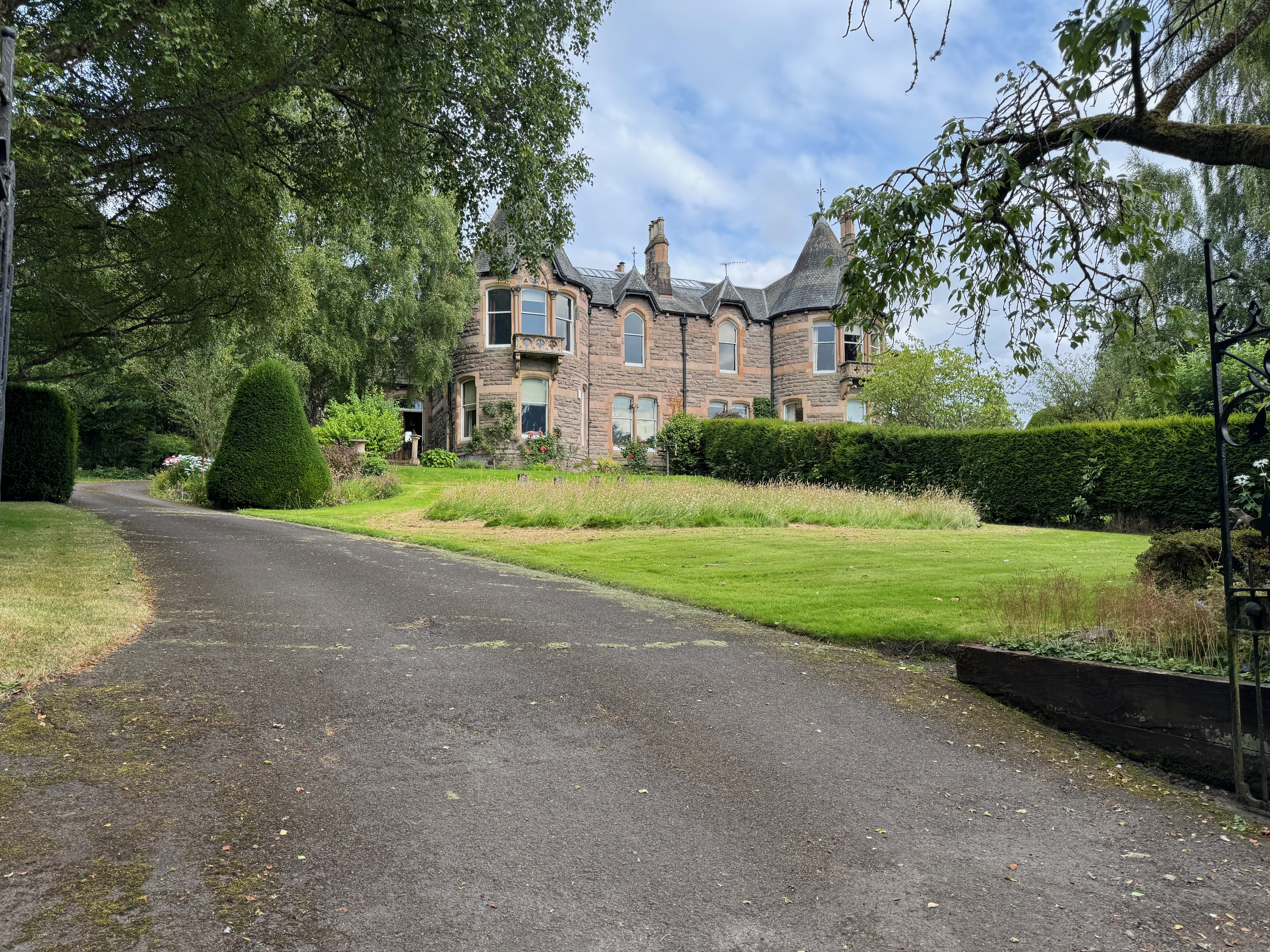
Craigievar and Darnick (2024)

In his younger years, Heiton was a prominent rugby player and cricketer, playing for Perthshire CC.

For a period, Heiton and his uncle lived at a double villa named Craigievar and Darnick (itself now Category B listed), on Kinnoull Terrace in Perth, and in one of the same name in Darnick, Roxburghshire.

He married Catherine Dunn, daughter of W. H. Dunn of Melrose. They had a daughter, Judy.

During the First World War, he served as a captain in the Black Watch. He was commanded with guarding the Highland Main Line between Perth and Inverness. It was a role that affected his health, due to his exposure to the wintry weather.

=== Death ===
Heiton died while holidaying in Harrogate, North Yorkshire, in June 1927.
