= Kinnoull Terrace =

Street in Perth, Scotland

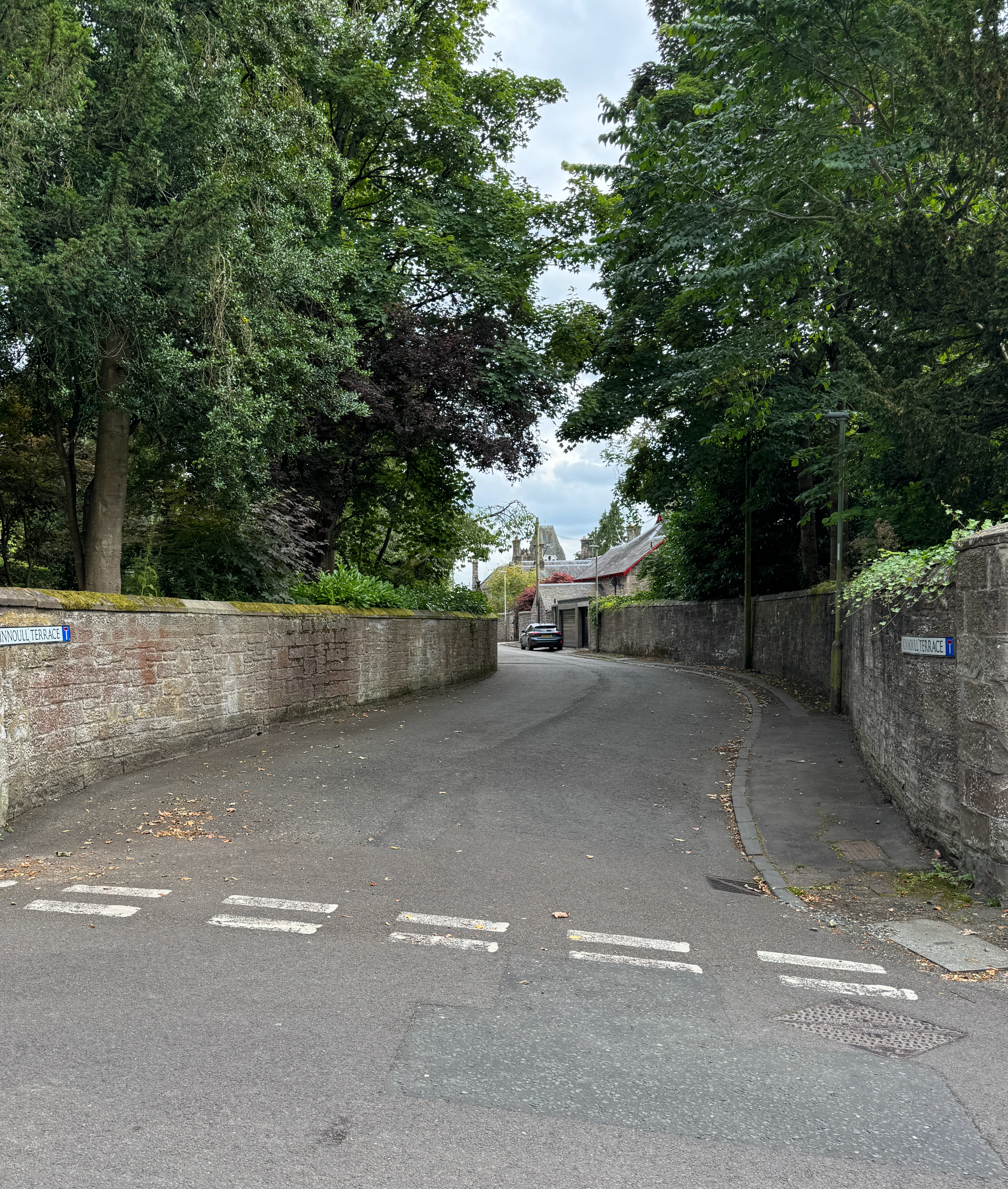
- The entrance to Kinnoull Terrace, viewed from Bowerswell Road
- Interactive map of Kinnoull Terrace
- Location: Kinnoull, Perth and Kinross, Scotland
- North end: Bowerswell Road

Kinnoull Terrace is a street in the Kinnoull parish of Perth, Scotland. A cul-de-sac, it contains five properties (four villas and one double villa), each of which is of listed status and dating from the 19th century. The street was specifically designed, in the mid-19th century, to take advantage of its viewpoint across the River Tay, as was the case with the six villas in Bridgend, a few hundred yards to the north. Noted architectural historian Charles McKean observed that those with "money of the [19th] century jostled for prime sites and views on Dundee Road and Kinnoull Terrace".

Several notable architects were used to design the properties, including Andrew Heiton and David Smart.

The three properties on the western side of the street each have gates in the communal boundary wall that runs along a stretch of the Dundee Road to the west; however, the one for Langlands (formerly Murrayville), the northernmost of the three, has been filled in.

Several of the properties appear on maps of Perth from the 1860s.

== Villas ==
A c. 1903 view from the Perth side of the River Tay. While many of the riverfront buildings here are now gone, the villas on Kinnoull Terrace are visible on the right, just above the level of the Dundee Road

Western side

- 2, Murrayville (now Langlands) – Category C listed
- 4, Gaskhill – Category C listed
- 6, Witchhill House – Category B listed

Eastern side

- 1–3, Craigievar and Darnick (double villa) – Category B listed
- 5, Somerset – Category C listed

Another, smaller property on the street was formerly the offices of John McLaren and Philip Russell Diplock, architects and planning consultants. Known as "the Den", it is Category C listed.

=== Architects ===
The architect of the double villa Craigievar and Darnick was Andrew Heiton, who also lived at the property upon its completion in 1870. It remained in the Heiton family until 1927, when Andrew Granger Heiton's widow, Catherine, sold it. David Smart designed Witchhill House, which was completed around 1860.

== See also ==
- List of listed buildings in Perth, Scotland
