= Queens Hotel, Perth =

Hotel in Perth, Scotland

Queens Hotel
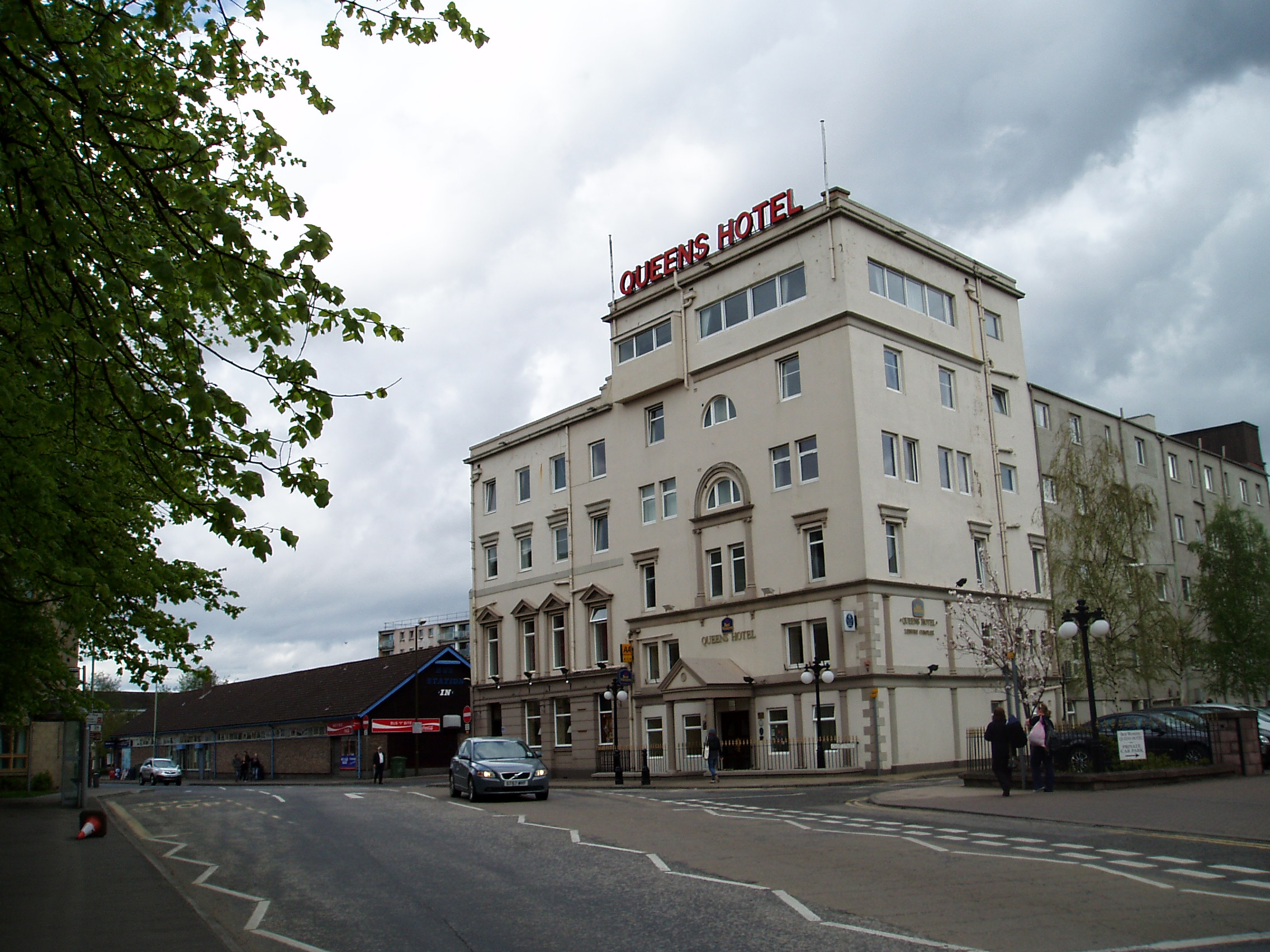
- The hotel, and adjacent Perth bus station, in 2010
- Interactive map of the Queens Hotel area
- Former names: Gillan's Queen's Hotel

General information
- Type: Hotel
- Location: Perth, Leonard Street, Scotland
- Coordinates: 56°23′34″N 3°26′14″W
- Owner: Best Western

Technical details
- Floor count: 5

Other information
- Number of rooms: 51
- Public transit: Perth; Perth

Website
- www.queensperth.co.uk

The Queens Hotel is located in Perth, Perth and Kinross, Scotland. It stands on Leonard Street, at its junction with Cross Street, around 200 feet (61 m) northwest of the Station Hotel, which was also built in the 19th century to take advantage of tourists arriving in and departing from the city from the adjacent Perth railway station. Queen Victoria was a regular visitor to that hotel.

Named Gillan's Queen's Hotel in the late 18th and early 19th centuries, it had an attached bar on its northern side. In 1889, it was one of four Perth public houses fined for breaching the Forbes McKenzie Act by not enforcing closing time on a Tuesday night. The legislation was passed in 1853 to regulate pubs in Scotland.

Today's incarnation is owned by Best Western. The buildings attached to the northern side of the original hotel, and part of Pomarium Street to the rear, were demolished in the 1950s to make way for Perth bus station.

In 1918, during the latter stages of World War I, the building was used as the headquarters for the district directorate of the Ministry of Labour for Perthshire and surrounding counties. The department's charge was "the resettlement in civil life of officers and men of like educational qualifications".

In 2022, not longer after the hotel had been purchased by the Compass Hospitality Group, after being put on the market for £1.25m, the hotel closed in order to house asylum seekers.

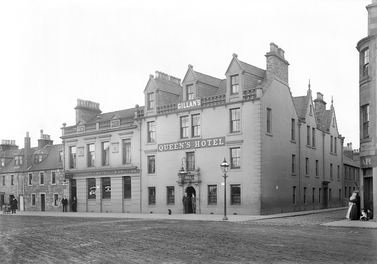
The previous incarnation of the hotel, pictured in 1905
