= Caledonian Road Primary School =

Building in Scotland

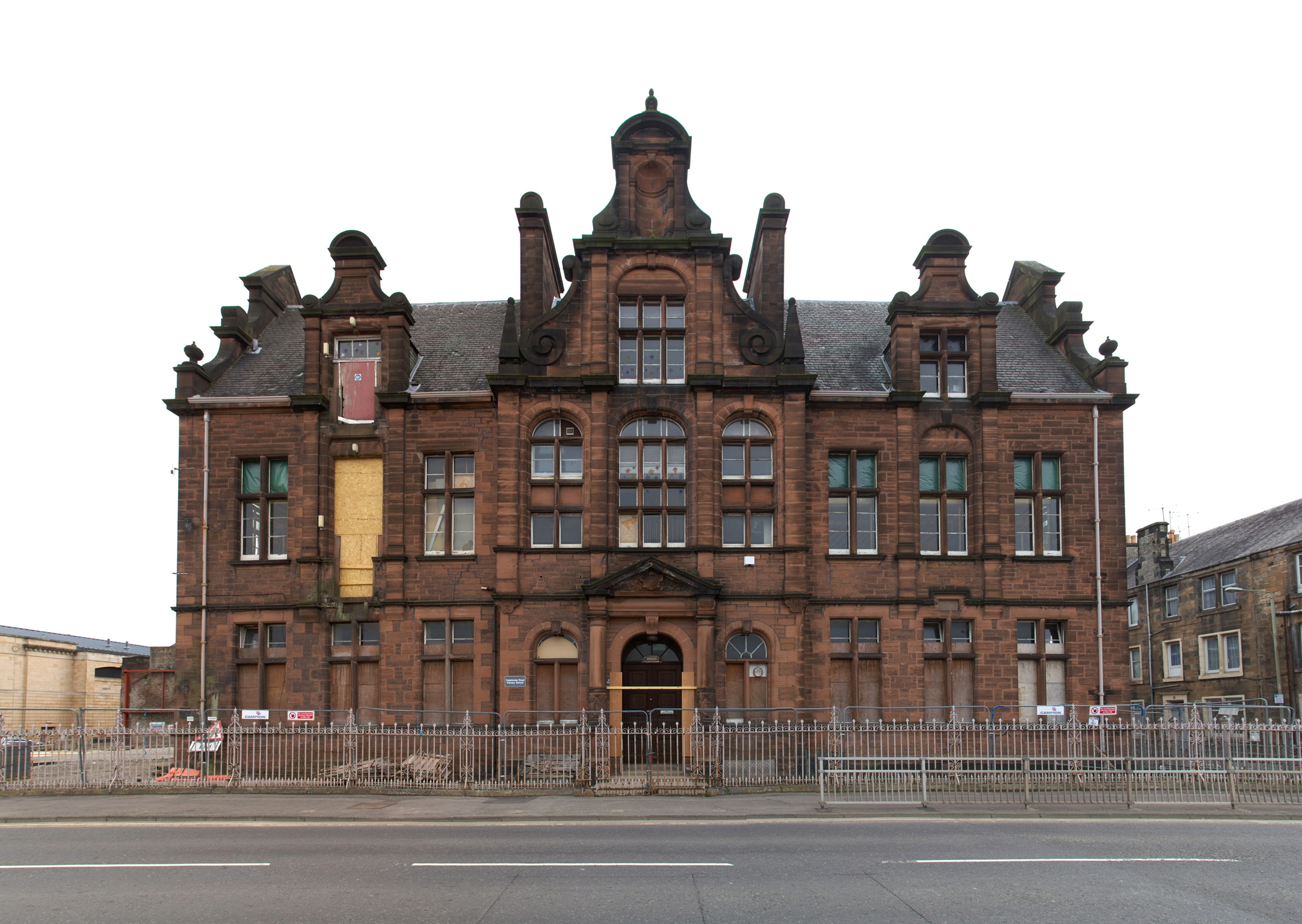
- The building in 2016, six years after the school closed
- Interactive map of the Caledonian Road Primary School area

General information
- Architectural style: Victorian
- Location: Caledonian Road, Perth, Perth and Kinross, Scotland
- Coordinates: 56.3944°N 3.4386°W
- Completed: 1892 (134 years ago)
- Owner: Caledonia Housing Association

Technical details
- Floor count: 3

Design and construction
- Architects: Andrew Heiton; Andrew Granger Heiton

Caledonian Road Primary School is a former school building in Perth, Perth and Kinross, Scotland. Dating from 1892 and made of red sandstone, it is a Category B listed building. Designed by uncle-nephew duo Andrew Heiton and Andrew Granger Heiton, the building is at the western edge of Perth's city centre.

== Residential use ==
The building ceased to be a school in October 2010, and was divided into 24 flats owned by Caledonia Housing Association around seven years later. Health and safety rules meant the building's atrium was sealed off, to be made accessible only on special occasions. The project also involved a new block, of 21 flats, constructed in the school's former playground. Six additional properties were built in an annex building that formerly housed the school's gymnasium, cafeteria and after-school club.

== Notable former students ==
- Ann Gloag, businesswoman

== See also ==
- List of listed buildings in Perth, Perth and Kinross
