= Craigievar and Darnick =

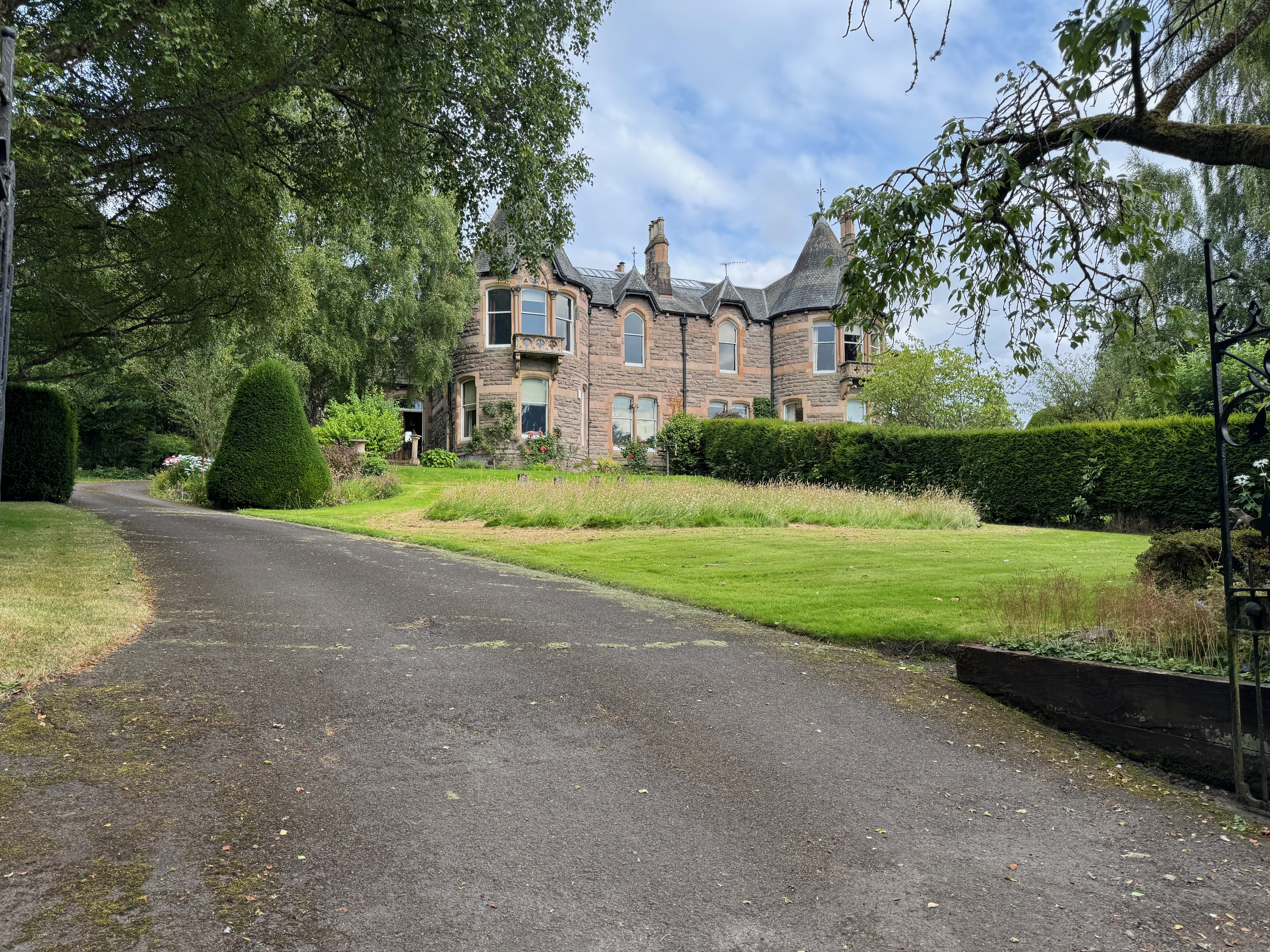
- Pictured in 2024

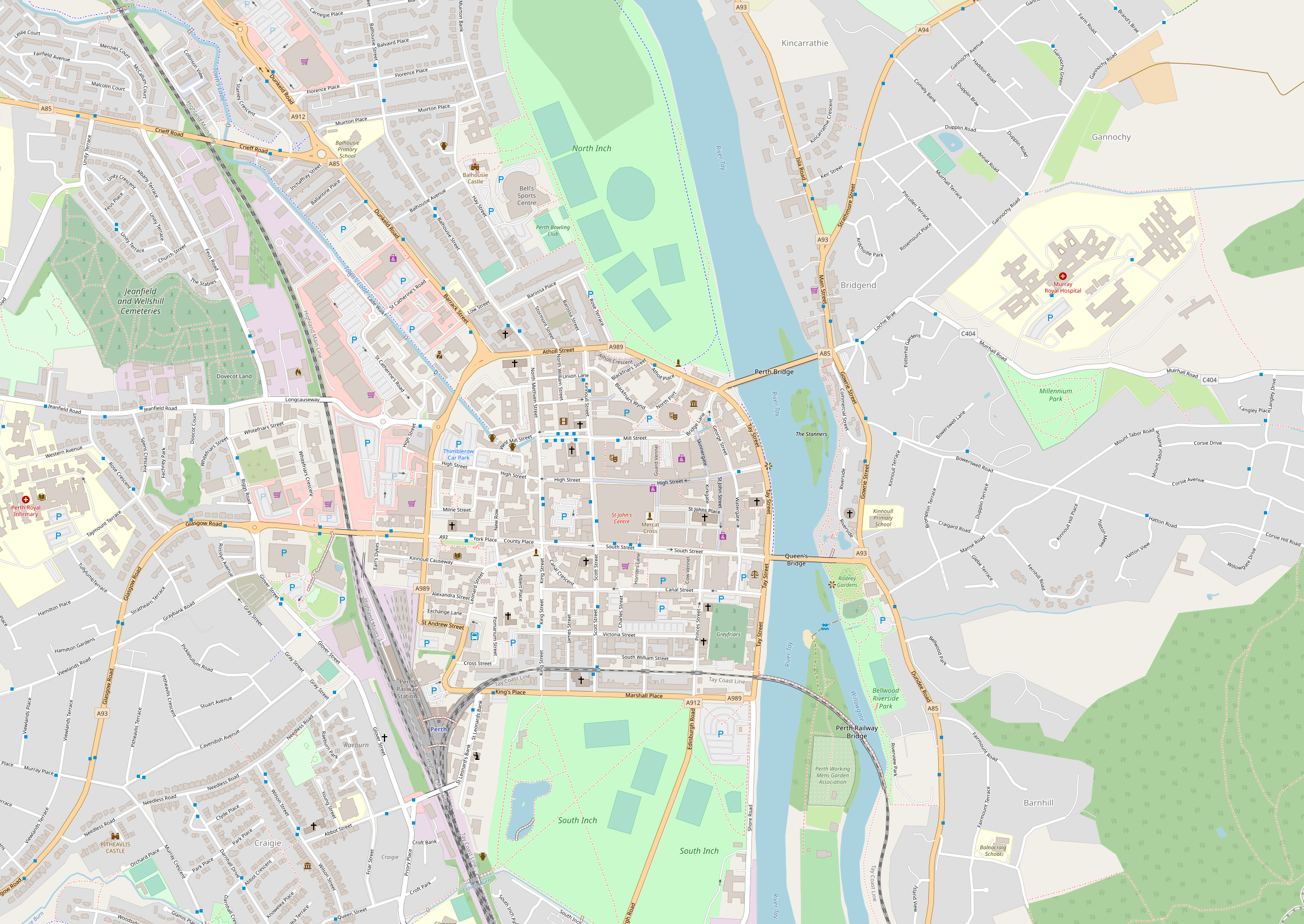
- Shown in Kinnoull
- 56.3969862°N 3.4200120°W
- Location: 1–3 Kinnoull Terrace; Kinnoull; Perth and Kinross; Scotland

History
- Built: c. 1870

Site notes
- Architect: Andrew Heiton
- Architectural style: French Gothic

Listed Building – Category B
- Designated: 26 August 1977
- Reference no.: LB39536

Craigievar and Darnick is an historic double villa in Kinnoull, Perth and Kinross, Scotland. Located on Kinnoull Terrace, it is a Category B listed building, built around 1870. The work of architect Andrew Heiton, who lived at the property upon its completion, it is one of five listed properties on the street, denoted by Historic Environment Scotland as items of special interest. Several of the properties appear on maps of Perth from the 1860s.

The villa remained in the Heiton family until 1927, when Andrew Granger Heiton's widow, Catherine, sold it.
