= Gaskhill =

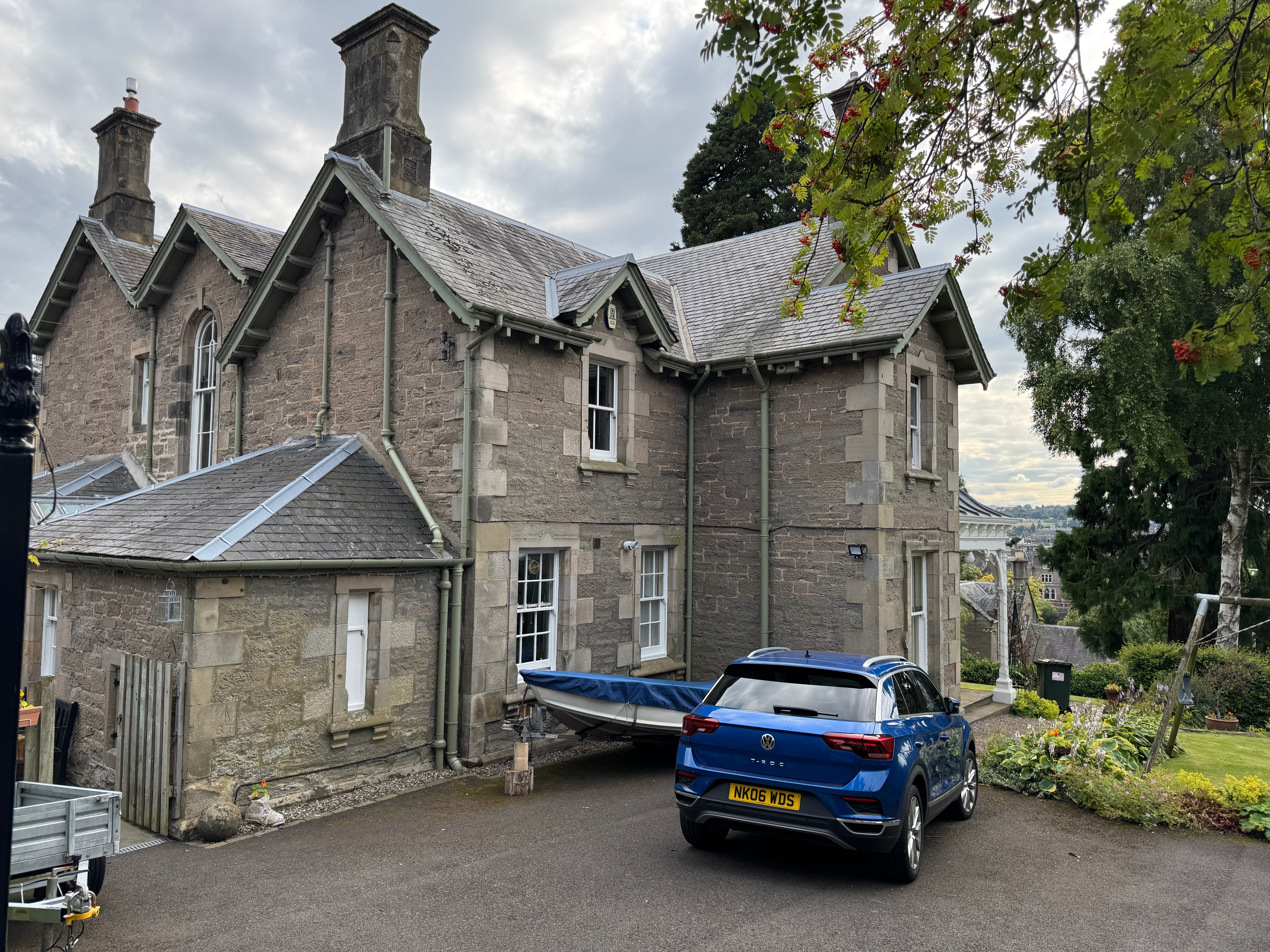
- Pictured in 2024

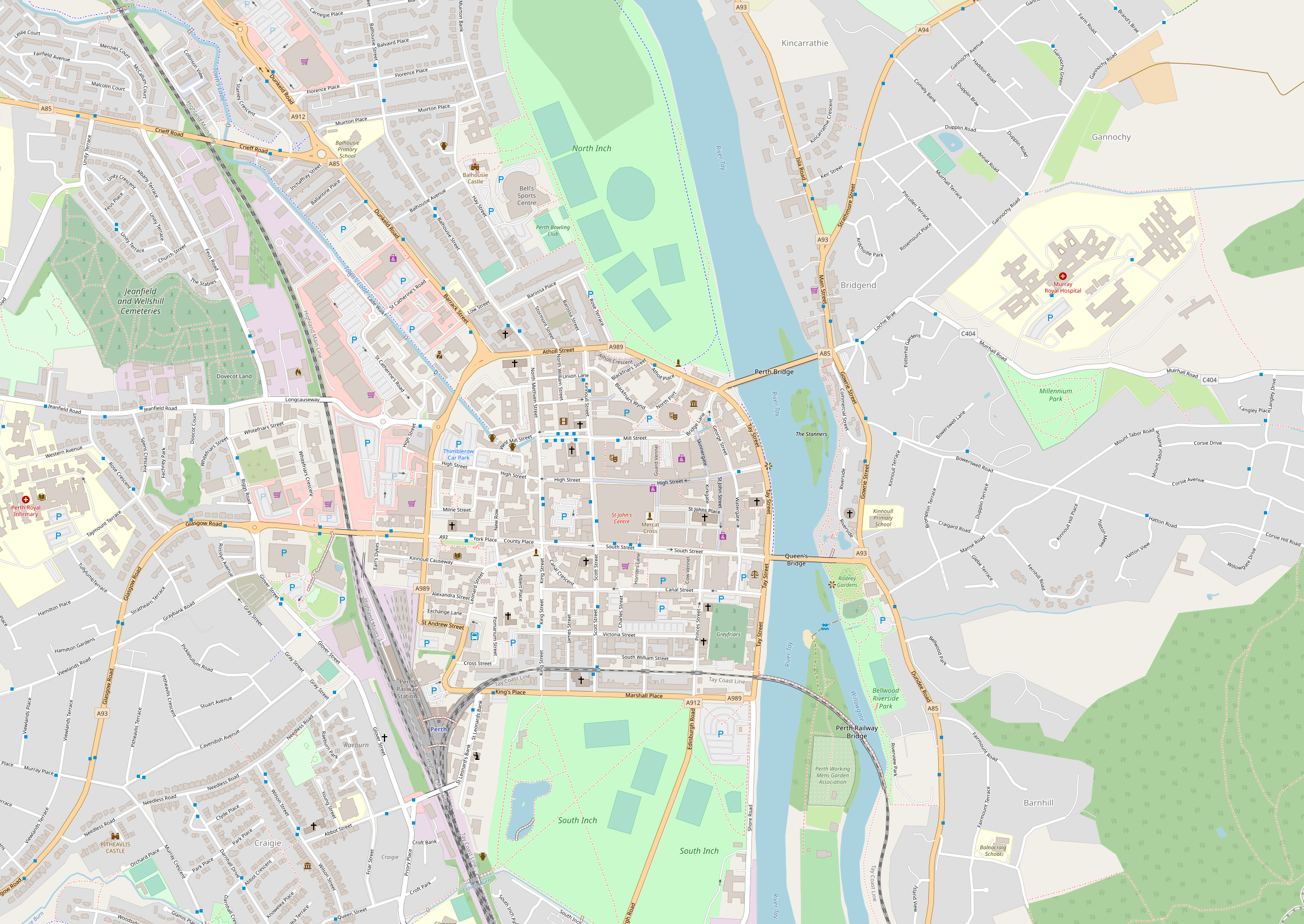
- Shown in Kinnoull
- 56.396647356°N 3.4211523°W
- Location: 4 Kinnoull Terrace; Kinnoull; Perth and Kinross; Scotland

History
- Built: mid-19th century

Listed Building – Category C(S)
- Designated: 26 August 1977
- Reference no.: LB39534

Gaskhill is an historic villa in Kinnoull, Perth and Kinross, Scotland. Located on Kinnoull Terrace, it is a Category C listed building, built in the mid-19th century. It is one of five listed properties on the street, denoted by Historic Environment Scotland as items of special interest. Several of the properties appear on maps of Perth from the 1860s.

Along with the two other listed villas on its (the western) side of the street, it has a gate in the communal boundary wall that runs along a stretch of the Dundee Road to the west; however, the one for Langlands has been filled in.
