= Guildhall, Perth =

Perth Guildhall
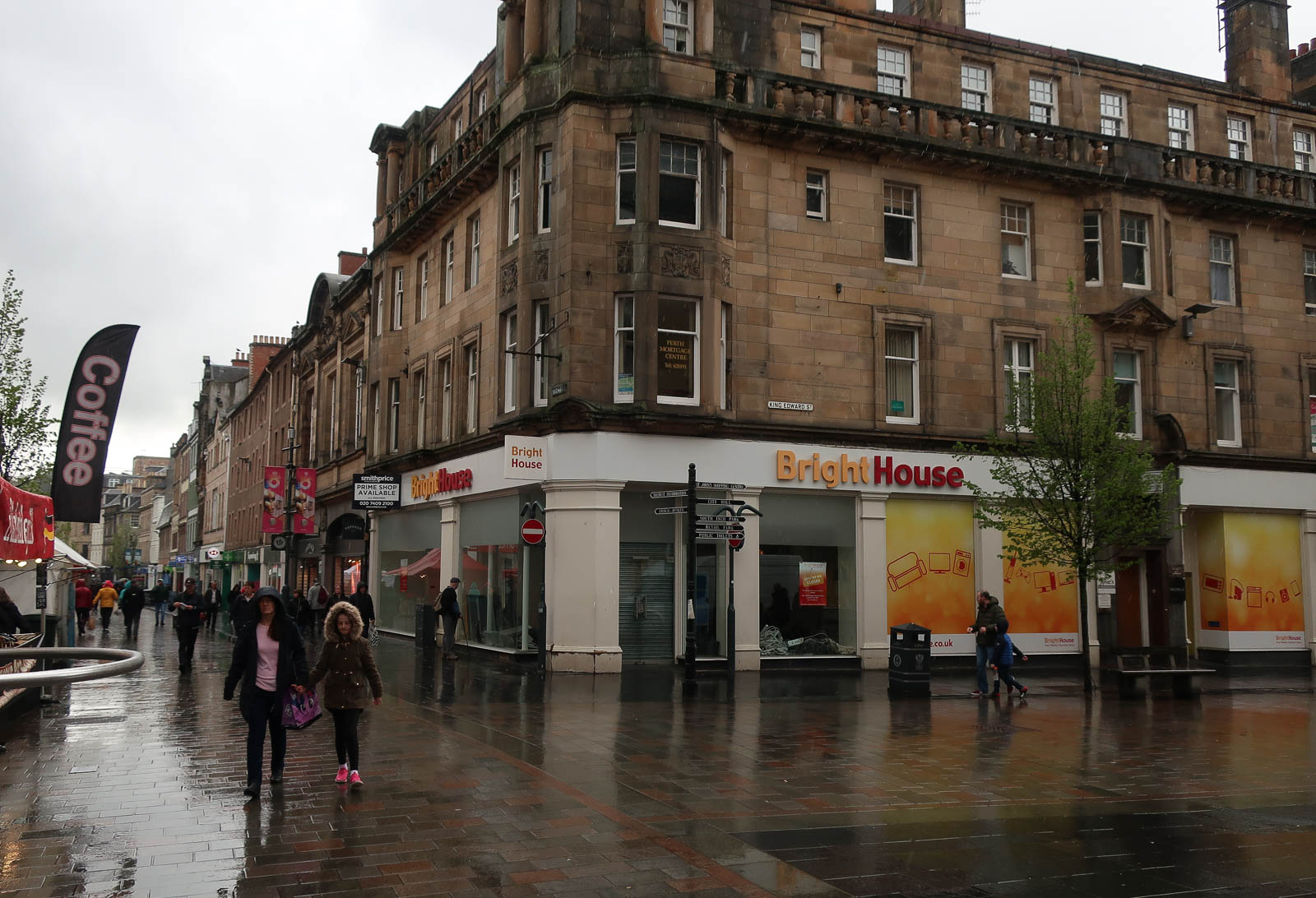
- The building in 2019, looking east

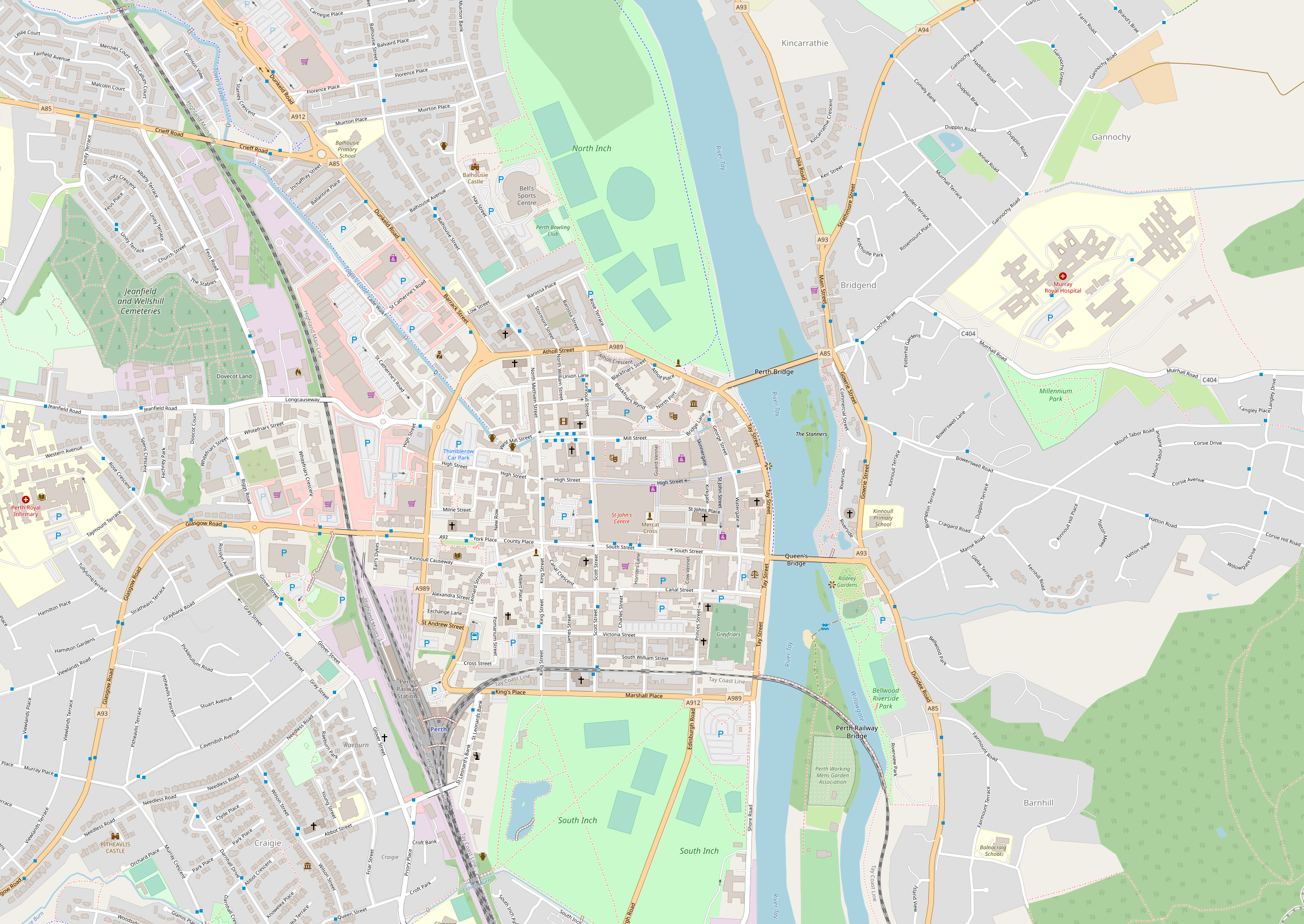
- Shown in Perth Guildhall, Perth (Scotland)
- 56.3965°N 3.4295°W
- Location: 102–106 High Street, Perth, Scotland

History
- Built: 1907–1908

Site notes
- Architect(s): Andrew Heiton; Andrew Granger Heiton
- Sculptor: H. H. Morton
- Architectural style: Elizabethan
- Governing body: Historic Environment Scotland

Listed Building – Category B
- Designated: 26 August 1977
- Reference no.: LB39481

Perth Guildhall is a building at today's 102–106 High Street, Perth, Scotland. The structure, which stands at the corner of High Street and King Edward Street, a block north of Perth City Hall, is Category B listed, dating to 1907. It stands on the site of a former guildhall that existed between 1722 and 1907. The previous building, which was torn down in May 1907, also used to hold theatre plays. Unlike today's three-storey structure, its predecessor was only two levels, the ground floor occupied by merchants, including D. Robertson booksellers and James Wotherspoon's hatters shortly before its demolition.

The foundation stone of today's structure was laid in the second half of 1907 by incumbent Dean of Guild, James Barlas. It was opened on 29 August 1908. The building hosted the Guild's activities until 1988, at which point it suffered collateral damage from construction work on an adjacent building. The hall was deemed beyond economic repair, and was sold for development. The Guild used the funds to purchase new premises at 5 Atholl Street, near the North Inch.

Its façade features sculptures in its segmental pediment, the work of H. H. Morton.

== Previous structure and architectural detail ==
A sketch of a photograph of the previous guildhall, shortly before its demolition in 1907

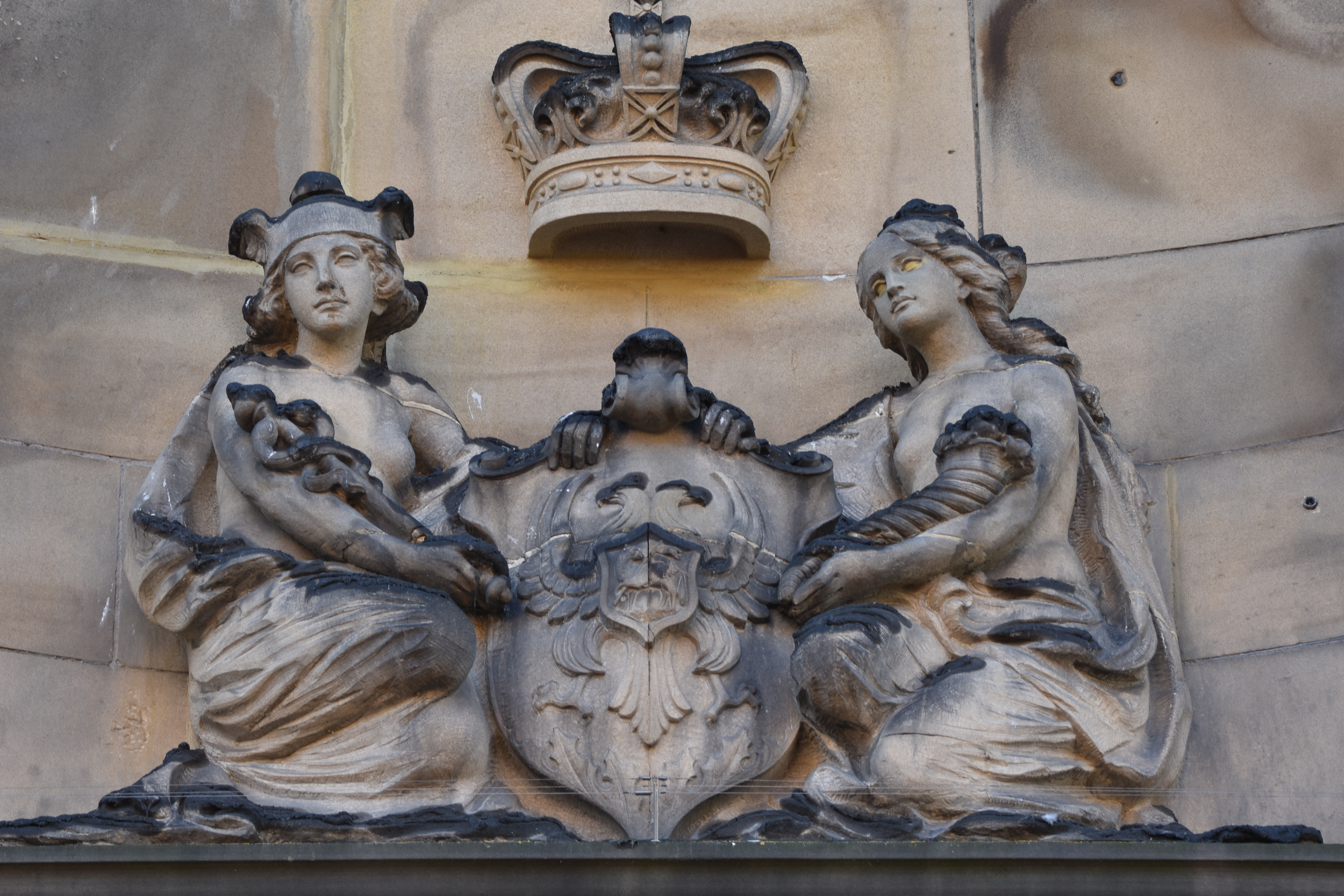
Today's structure features pediment sculptures, the work of H. H. Morton, including this one of two semi-naked figures representing Trade and Agriculture

== See also ==
- List of listed buildings in Perth, Scotland
