= Witchhill House =

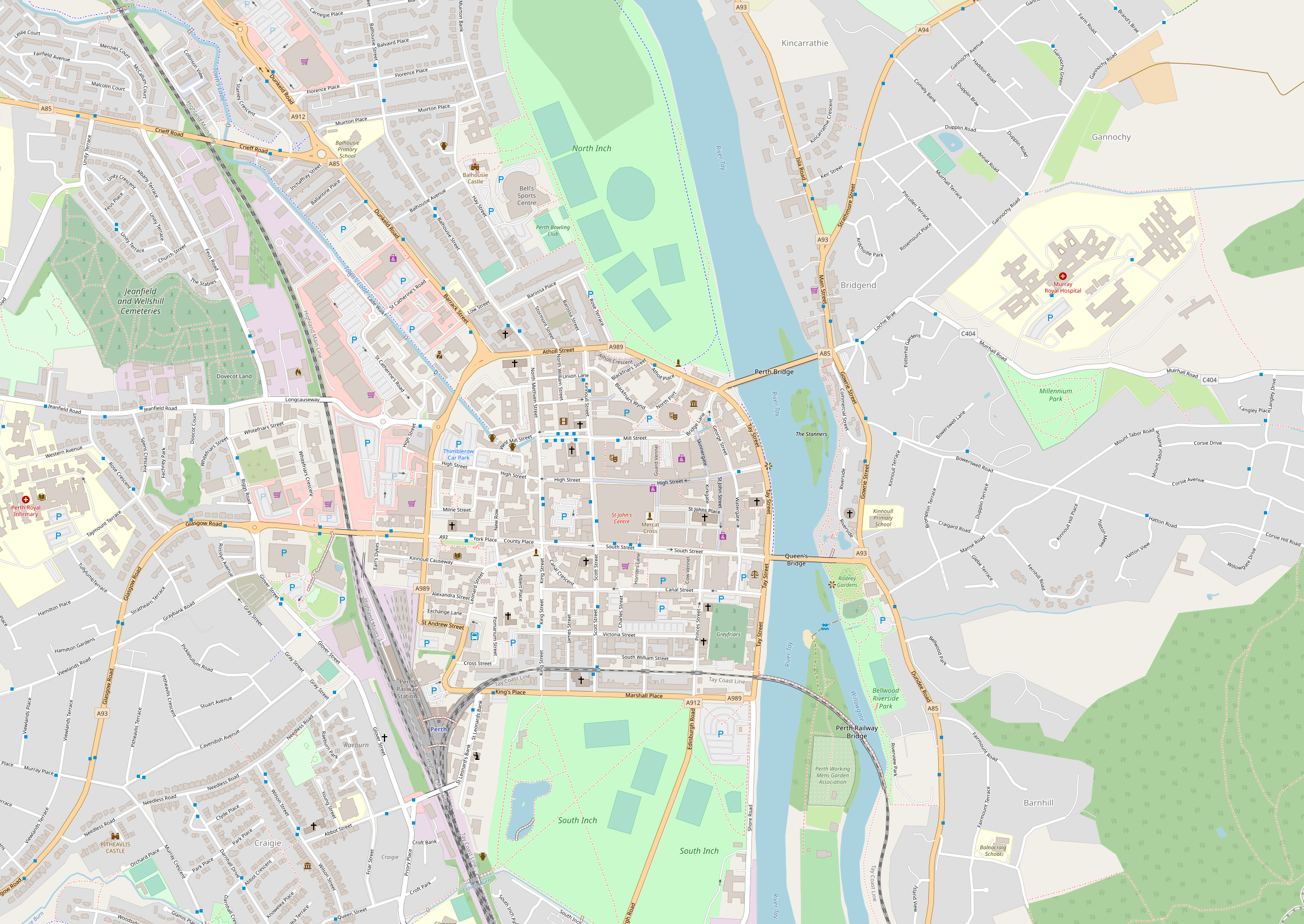
- Shown in Kinnoull
- 56.39635422°N 3.4212367°W
- Location: 6 Kinnoull Terrace; Kinnoull; Perth and Kinross; Scotland

History
- Built: c. 1860

Site notes
- Architect: David Smart

Listed Building – Category B
- Designated: 26 August 1977
- Reference no.: LB39535

Witchhill House is an historic villa in Kinnoull, Perth and Kinross, Scotland. Located on Kinnoull Terrace, it is a Category B listed building, built around 1860. Designed by David Smart, it is one of five listed properties on the street, denoted by Historic Environment Scotland as items of special interest. Several of the properties appear on maps of Perth from the 1860s.

Along with the two other listed villas on its (the western) side of the street, it has a gate in the communal boundary wall that runs along a stretch of the Dundee Road to the west; however, the one for Langlands has been filled in.

Witchhill Quarry, which formerly stood on the site of Kinnoull Terrace, was the source of much of the stone used in Perth's buildings from the 19th century onwards.
