= Somerset (villa) =

Historic villa in Kinnoull, Scotland

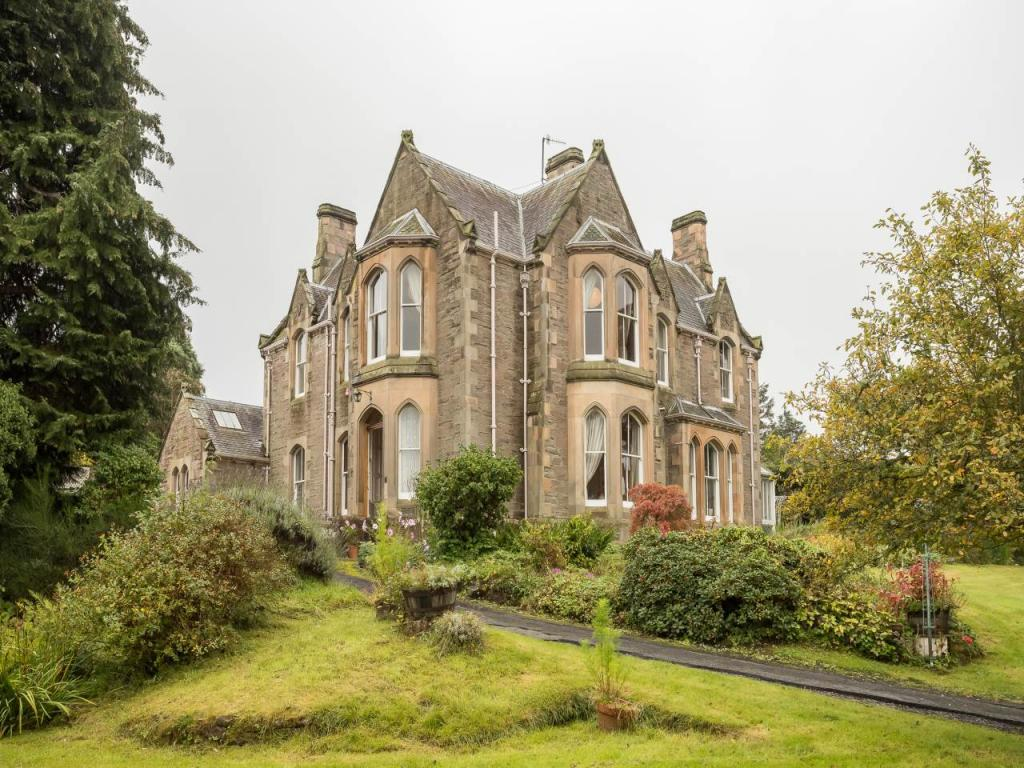
- The building in 2024

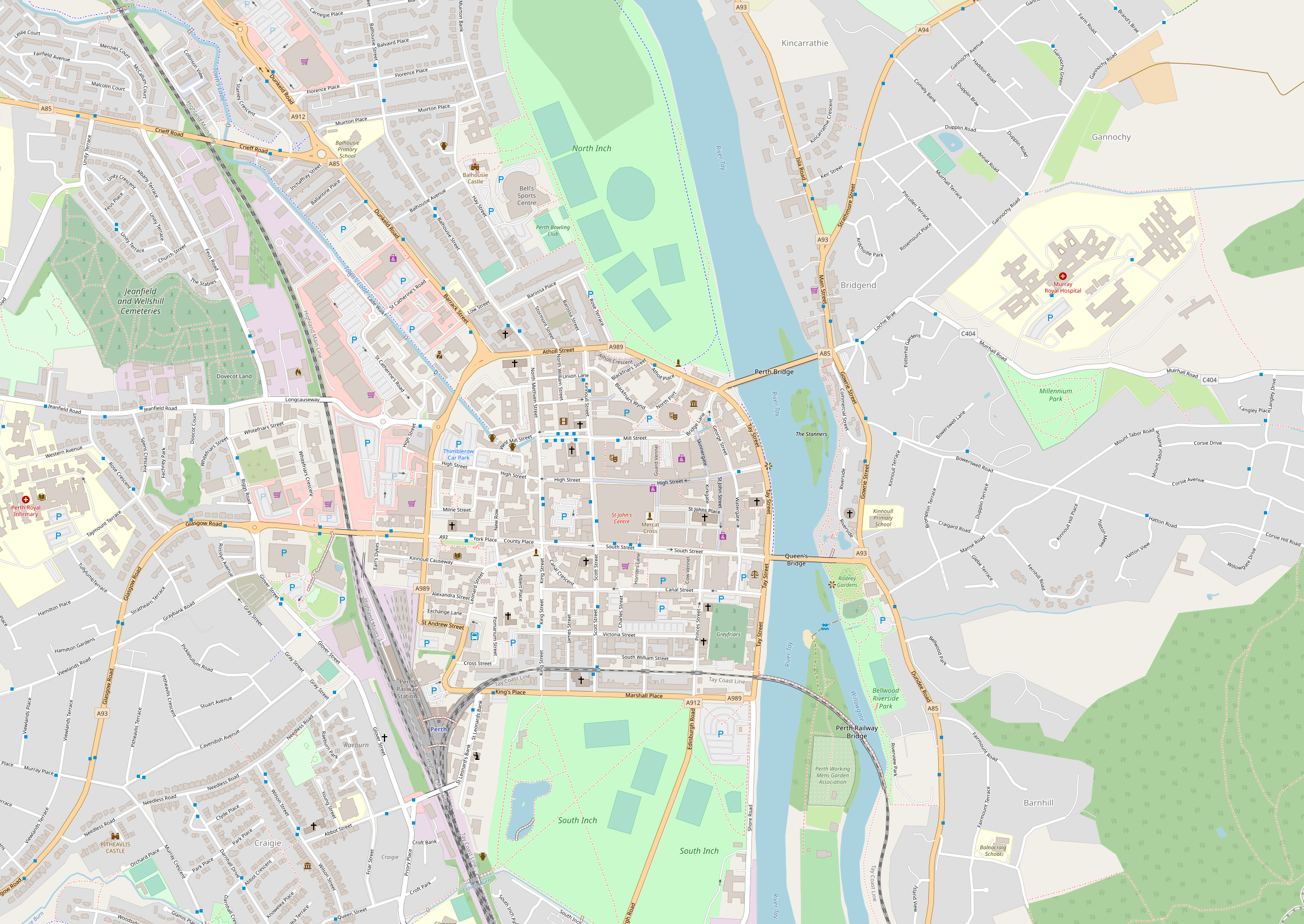
- Shown in Kinnoull
- 56.39637475°N 3.42030709°W
- Location: 5 Kinnoull Terrace; Kinnoull; Perth and Kinross; Scotland

History
- Built: c. 1868

Site notes
- Architectural style: Gothic

Listed Building – Category C(S)
- Designated: 26 August 1977
- Reference no.: LB39537

Somerset is an historic villa in Kinnoull, Perth and Kinross, Scotland. Located on Kinnoull Terrace, it is a Category C listed building, built around 1868. It is one of five listed properties on the street, denoted by Historic Environment Scotland as items of special interest. Several of the properties appear on maps of Perth from the 1860s.
