= John Murray Robertson =

Scottish architect

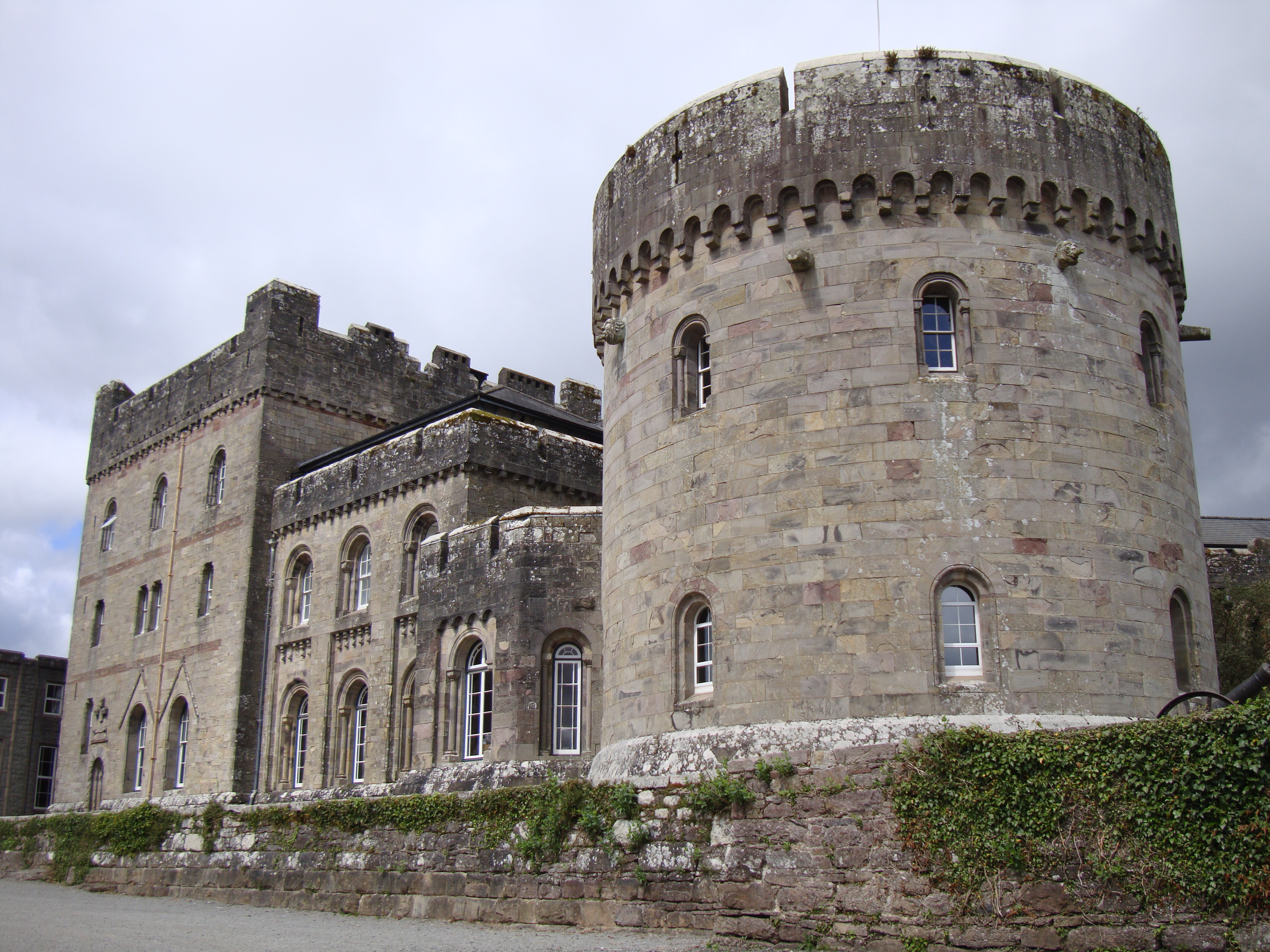
Glenstal Castle

John Murray Robertson FRIBA (31 January 1844 – 31 January 1901) was a Scottish architect who did much to change Dundee.

== Life ==
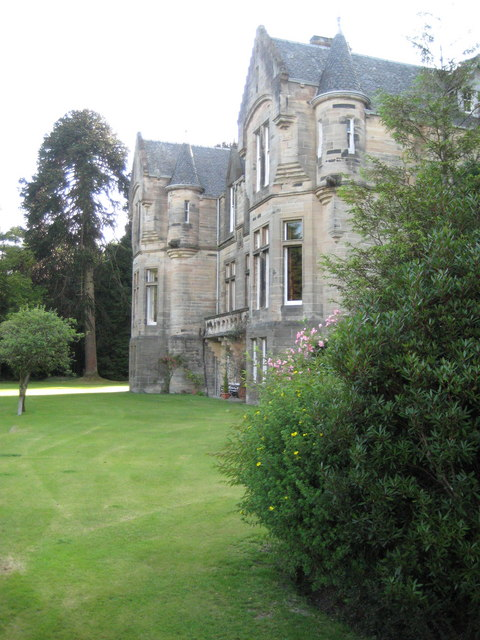
Giffen House

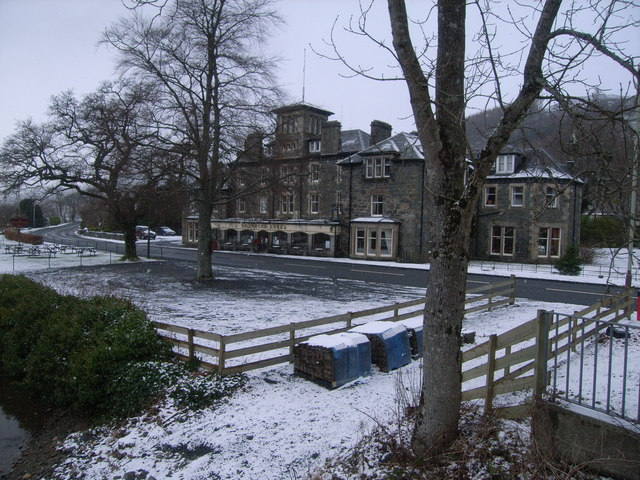
The Drummond Arms Hotel, St Fillans

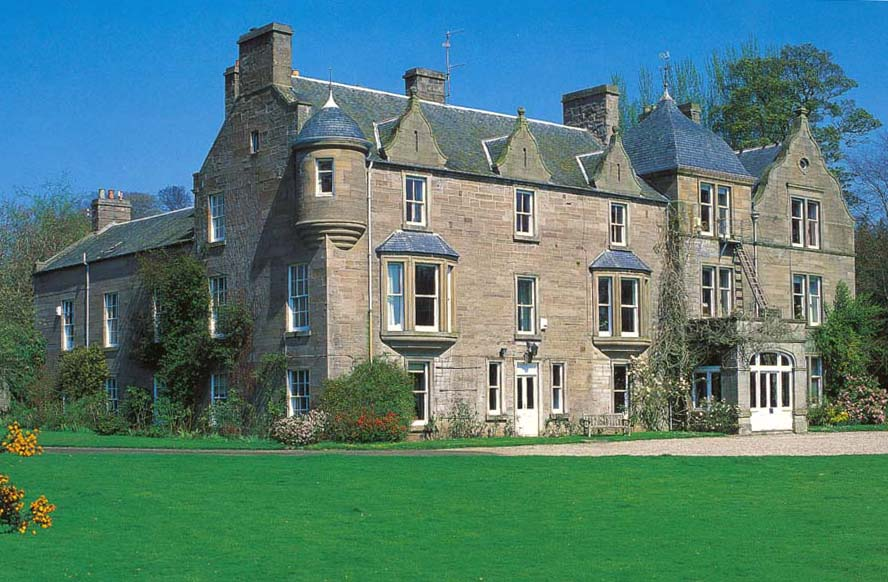
Balmuir House

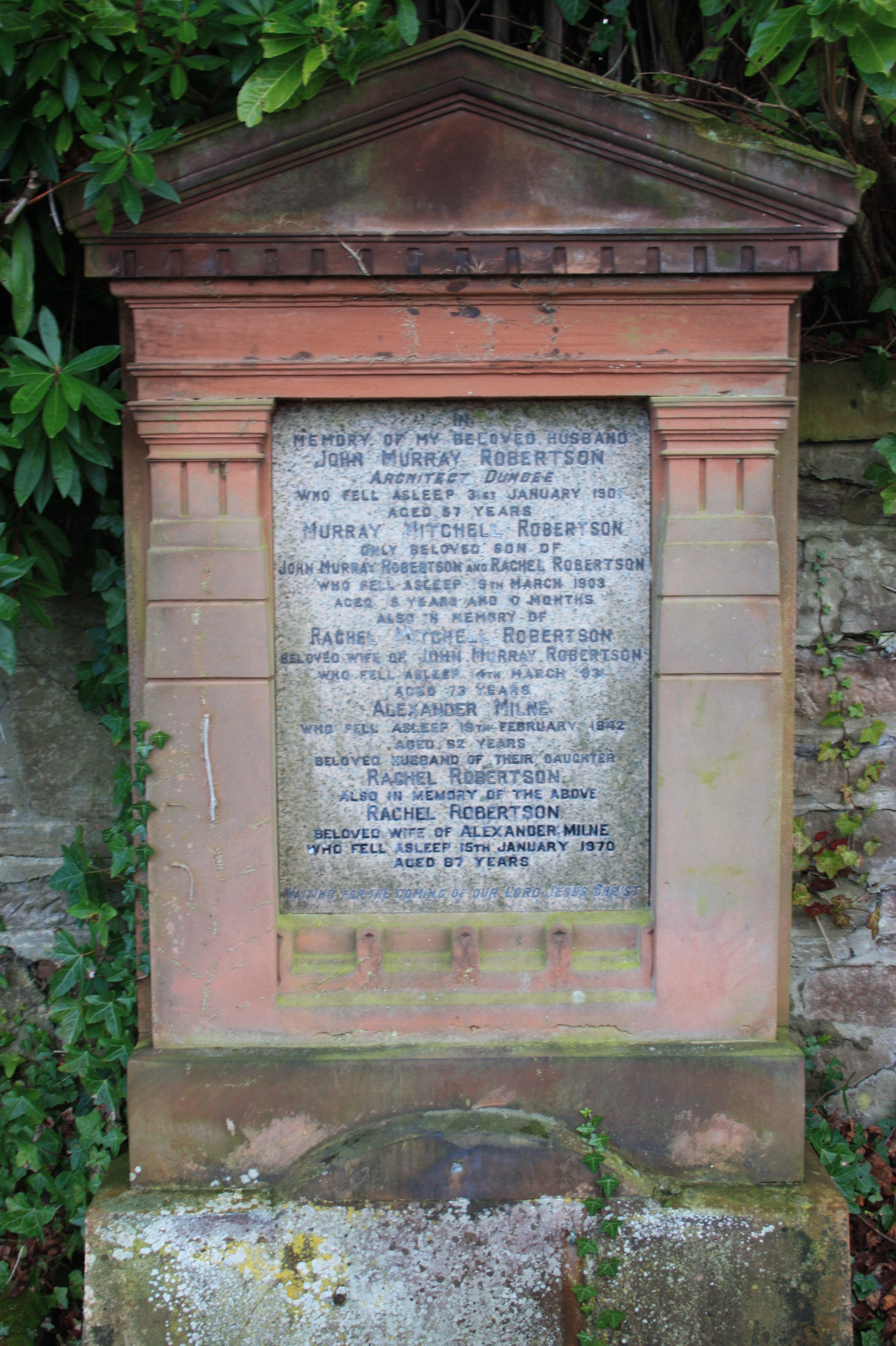
The grave of John Murray Robertson, Wellshill Cemetery, Perth

He was born on 31 January 1844 at Strathord in Perthshire the son of James Robertson and Catherine Smeaton, who were a strict Plymouth Brethren couple. Murray (as he was usually called) was articled to the architect Andrew Heiton in Perth in 1859. In 1865 Heiton opened a Dundee branch and Murray Robertson was asked to run it as senior draughtsman, primarily overseeing church projects. His offices were at Albert Square in Dundee.

One of his final projects was Glenstal Castle in Ireland.

== Death ==
Robertson died at Crossmount, Bridgend, Perth, on 31 January 1901, his 57th birthday. He is buried in the city's Wellshill Cemetery. The grave lies on the wall on the south path leading to the Jeanfield section.

== Personal life ==
Robertson was married to Rachel Mitchell Robertson (1858–1931). Their only son, Murray Mitchell Robertson, died in his youth.

== Principal works ==
- Free East Church, Broughty Ferry (1863)
- Westwood House, Newport-on-Tay (1865)
- Hamilton House, Perth (1865)
- Redgorton Manse (1866)
- Castleroy, Broughty Ferry (1867)
- Newfargie House, Glenfarg (1867)
- Kinfauns Castle (1868; with Andrew Heiton)
- Orchill, Dunblane (1868)
- Port-an-Eilean, Strathtummel (1868)
- Giffen House, Dalry, Ayrshire (1869)
- Craigclowan, Perthshire (1870)
- Taybank, Perth (1870)
- St Fillans RC Church (1871)
- Greig Institute, Leven, Fife (1872)
- Kinbrae House, Newport, Fife (1872)
- Newtyle Parish Church (1872)
- Victoria Buildings, Perth (1872)
- Drummond Arms Hotel, St Fillans (1872)
- Samnugger Jute Company, housing in Calcutta in India (1873) without going to India
- Luncarty Bleachworks (1873)
- Perth Savings Bank, Perth (1873)
- Drumore House, Perthshire (1874)
- Elmgrove, Broughty Ferry (1874)
- Hope Park, Blairgowrie (1874) and extension 1892
- India Buildings, Dundee (1874/1876)
- Ravenscraig, Dundee (1874)
- Reres Cottage, Barnhill, Dundee (1874)
- Rosebay House, Broughty Ferry (1875)
- Craigmount, Broughty Ferry (1875)
- Breachtower, Dundee (1875)
- Sack factory for James J Sinclair, Dundee (1876)
- Hunter's Department Store, Dundee (1877)
- Tayfield Works, Dundee (1877)
- 3 Norwood Crescent, Dundee (1880)
- Great Eastern Bar, Dundee (1880)
- Rosebank, Broughty Ferry (1880)
- Merchants Shelter, Royal Exchange, Dundee (1880)
- Broughty Ferry Baptist Church (1881)
- Knowehead House, Crieff (1882)
- The Bughties, Broughty Ferry (1882)
- Duncraggan, Newport, Fife (1883)
- Seathwood House, Dundee (1883)
- The Knowe, Broughty Ferry (1883)
- Rockknowe, Broughty Ferry (1884) rebuilt 1897 after a fire
- Balmuir House and model farm (1885)
- The Croft, Longforgan (1885)
- Ashton Works, Dundee (1886)
- Caledonian Insurance Offices, Dundee (1886)
- Elmslea, Dundee (1886)
- Dundee Technical Institute and University College (1886)
- Craigard, Broughty Ferry (1887)
- Dryburgh House, Camperdown House (1887)
- Station Hotel, Perth (1888)
- Glengate, Kirriemuir (1889)
- Drill Hall, Arbroath (1890)
- Remodelling of Jordanstone House, Meigle (1890)
- Glamis House, Dundee (1891)
- The Cairn, Longforgan (1891)
- St Clare, Tayport (1892)
- Arima, Broughty Ferry (1893)
- Castellar, Crieff (1893)
- Dudhope Works, Dundee (1893)
- Tighnamuirin, Monifieth (1893)
- Cox's Library and Baths, Lochee, Dundee (1894)
- Pitlochry Institute (1894)
- Barnhill Sanatorium, Perth (1897)
- Caird Maternity Block, Dundee Royal Infirmary (1897)
- Warehouse and offices for William Low & Co, Dundee (1897)
- Glenstal Castle additions, Ireland (1898/9)
- Hillside House, Perth (1898)
- Comerton Children's Home, Fife (1899)
- Heathfield Works, Dundee (1899)
- Lindertis, Kirriemuir (1899)
- Stanley manse (1900)
