= Radisson Blu Perth =

Hotel in Perth, Scotland

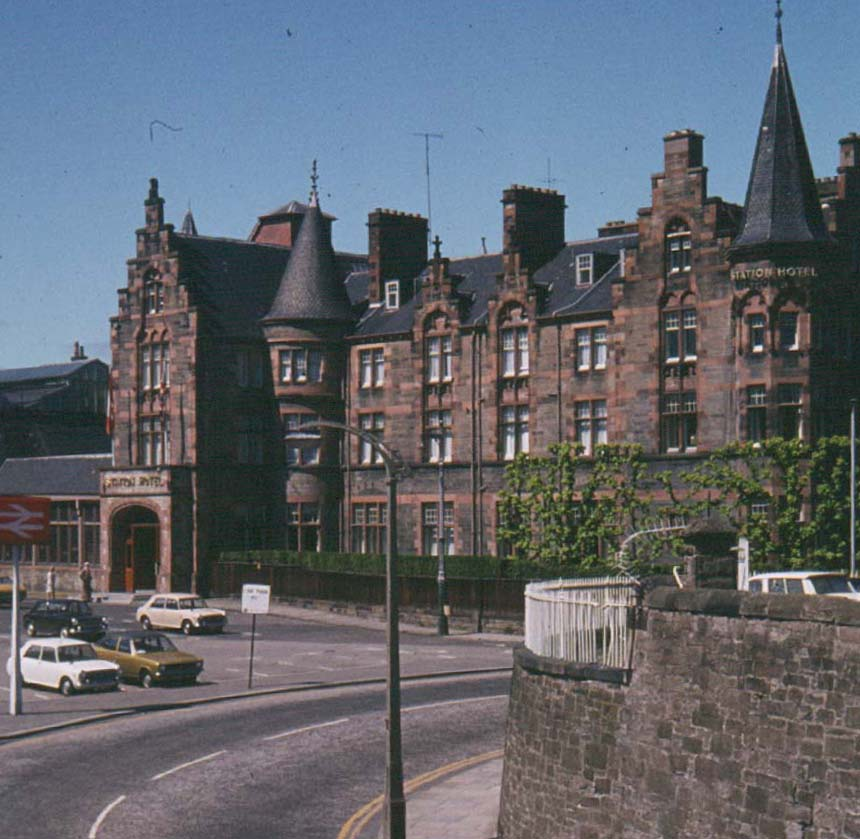
- A 1970s view of the hotel, looking northwest from Leonard Street
- Interactive map of the Radisson Blu Perth area
- Former names: Station Hotel

General information
- Status: Closed
- Architectural style: Flemish Gothic
- Location: 1 Leonard Street; Perth; Scotland
- Coordinates: 56.392635°N 3.438870°W
- Completed: 1888 (138 years ago)
- Governing body: Historic Environment Scotland

Design and construction
- Architects: Andrew Heiton; John Murray Robertson

Other information
- Public transit access: Perth; Perth

Website
- https://www.radissonhotels.com/en-us/hotels/radisson-blu-perth-scotland

Radisson Blu Perth (formerly known as the Station Hotel) is an historic building in Perth, Perth and Kinross, Scotland. Located on Leonard Street, it is a Category B listed building built in 1888. It opened for business in August 1890. One of the hotel's first managers was Arthur Foster.

The hotel faces Perth railway station, for which it is named. It is also close to Perth bus station. The hotel was formerly owned and managed by the Highland, North British and Caledonian Railway companies.

The building, made of cream and red sandstone, was designed by Perth's city architect Andrew Heiton, who assumed his role some thirty years earlier. He worked with another local architect, John Murray Robertson, on the project. The hotel is a notable example of Scottish baronial architecture.

Queen Victoria was a regular visitor to the hotel. She had breakfast there on her final visit to Perth in May 1900, eight months before her death. She was in a wheelchair on that day.

In 2021, the hotel joined Radisson Hotel Group and became Radisson Blu Perth. The following year, the hotel closed in order to house asylum seekers.

== See also ==
- List of listed buildings in Perth, Scotland
