= Fonab Castle =

Scottish castle

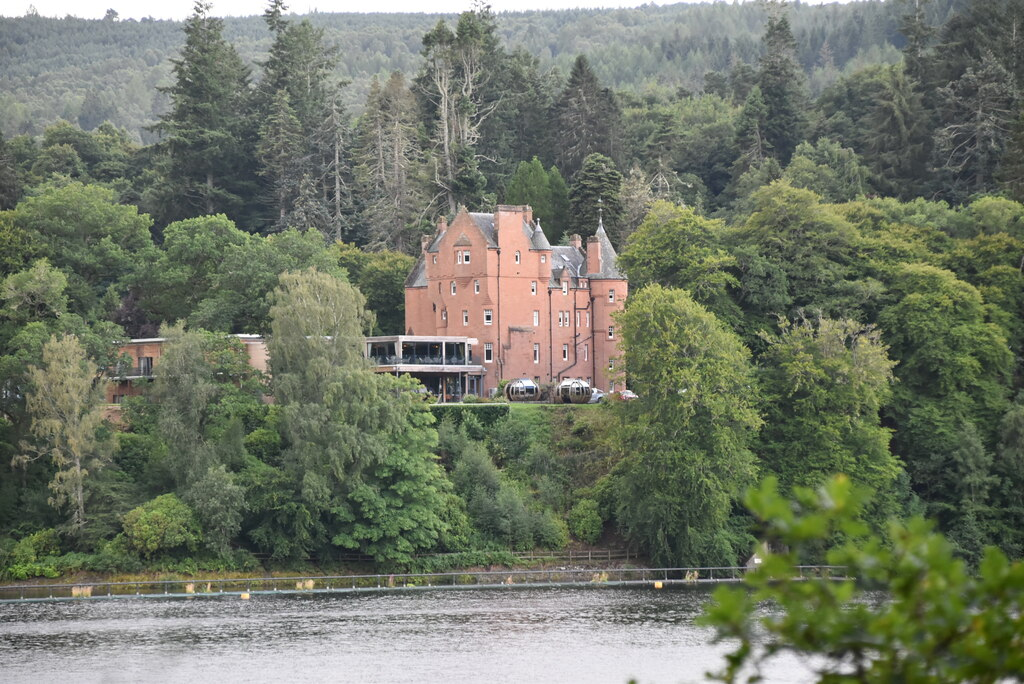
- The castle in 2021, viewed from the eastern banks of the River Tummel

- Location of Fonab Castle in Perth and Kinross
- 56.6983°N 3.7420°W
- Location: Pitlochry, Perth and Kinross, Scotland

History
- Built: 1892 (134 years ago)

Site notes
- Architect: Andrew Heiton
- Architectural style: Scots baronial

Listed Building – Category B
- Designated: 5 October 1971
- Reference no.: LB39859

Fonab Castle, also known as Port-na-Craig House, is located in Pitlochry, Perth and Kinross, Scotland.

== History ==
Built in 1892 for Lieutenant Colonel George Glas Sandeman, and now a Category B listed building. In 1946, the building became the property of the North of Scotland Hydro-Electric Board, who changed the property's name from Fonab Castle to Port-na-Craig House. The castle was altered internally in 1954.

The building lay empty for many years, and was listed on the Buildings at Risk Register for Scotland.

=== As a hotel ===
The castle is now a luxury five-star hotel, set in 11 acres (4.5 ha) (which is much less than its original acreage due to the flooding of Loch Faskally to create a reservoir). The hotel has a fine-dining restaurant of three AA Rosettes, and 43 guest bedrooms.

In 2022, the property was sold, via a Savills auction, to Fonab SPV.
