= Pitcur =

Coordinates: 56.5195°N 3.2170°W

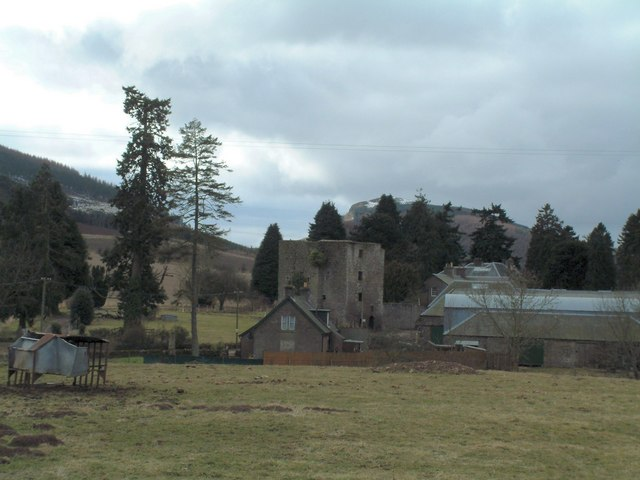
- Pitcur Castle, viewed from the northeast

- Location within Perth and Kinross
- Council area: Perth and Kinross
- Lieutenancy area: Perth and Kinross
- Country: Scotland
- Sovereign state: United Kingdom
- Post town: PERTH
- Postcode district: PH13
- Dialling code: 01738
- Police: Scotland
- Fire: Scottish
- Ambulance: Scottish
- UK Parliament: Perth and North Perthshire
- Scottish Parliament: North Tayside; North East Scotland

Pitcur is a hamlet at the eastern edge of Perth and Kinross, Scotland, about 2.5 miles (4.0 km) southeast of Coupar Angus.

It is home to the ruined 16th-century Pitcur Castle. Pitcur is situated in a valley 1 mile (1.6 km) to the north of Northballo Hill on the A923 road.

== Notable people ==
- Andrew Granger Heiton (1862–1927), architect
