= St Andrew's Church, Perth =

St Andrew's Church
- St Andrew's and St Stephen's Church
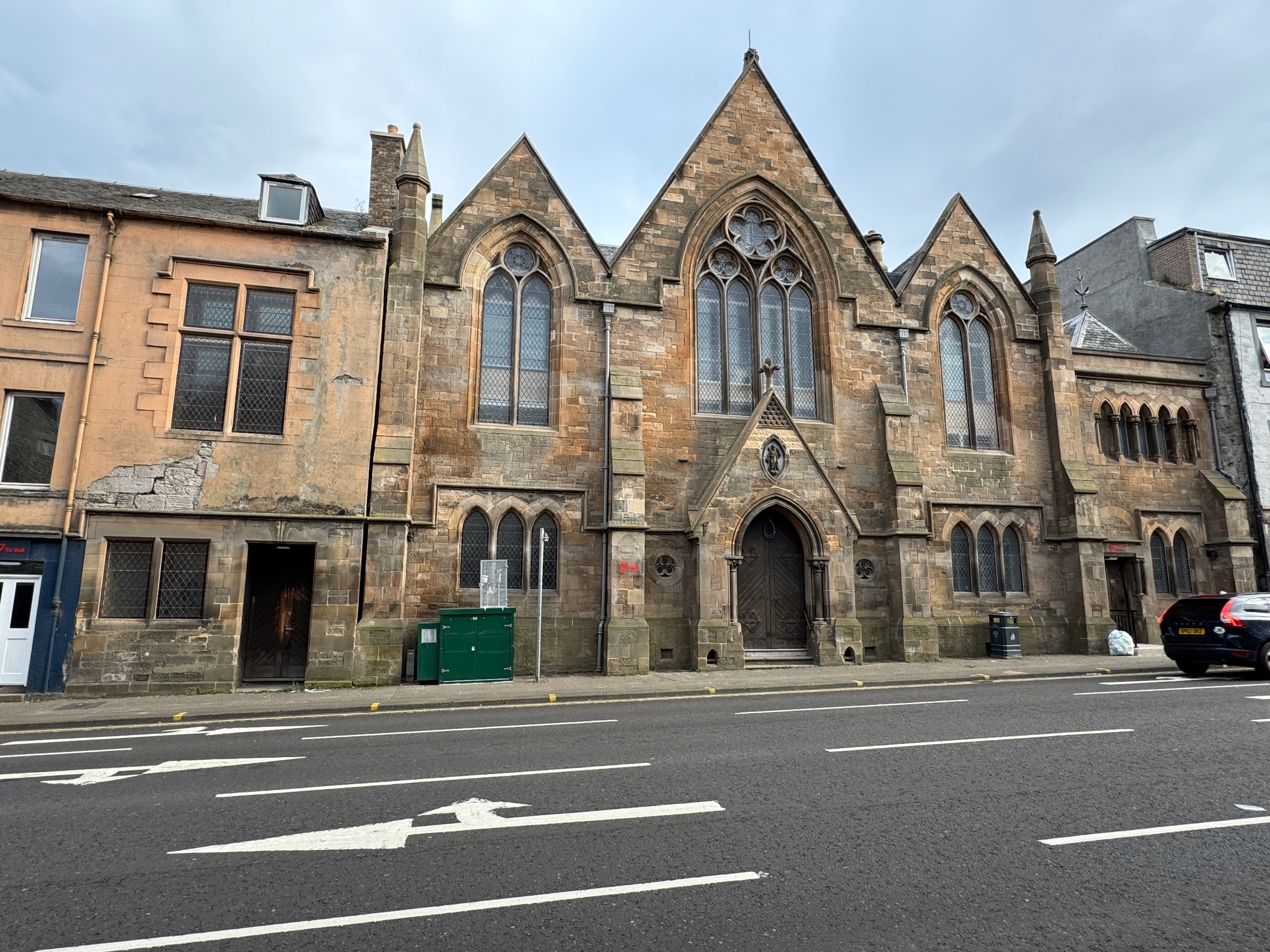
- The building in 2024
- St Andrew's Church
- 56°23′57″N 3°26′03″W
- Location: 19 Atholl Street, Perth, Perth and Kinross
- Country: Scotland

History
- Status: closed

Architecture
- Functional status: used
- Heritage designation: Category C listed building
- Designated: 19 November 2010
- Architect(s): Andrew Heiton; Andrew Granger Heiton
- Completed: 1885 (141 years ago)

St Andrew's Church (also known as St Andrew's and St Stephen's Church) is a former church building located in Perth, Perth and Kinross, Scotland. Standing at 19 Atholl Street, one block east of St Ninian's Cathedral, it was completed in 1885 by Robert Brand and Sons builders, the work of Andrew Heiton and his nephew Andrew Granger Heiton. It is now a Category C listed building.

== See also ==
- List of listed buildings in Perth, Scotland
