= Perth bus station =

Bus station in Perth, Scotland

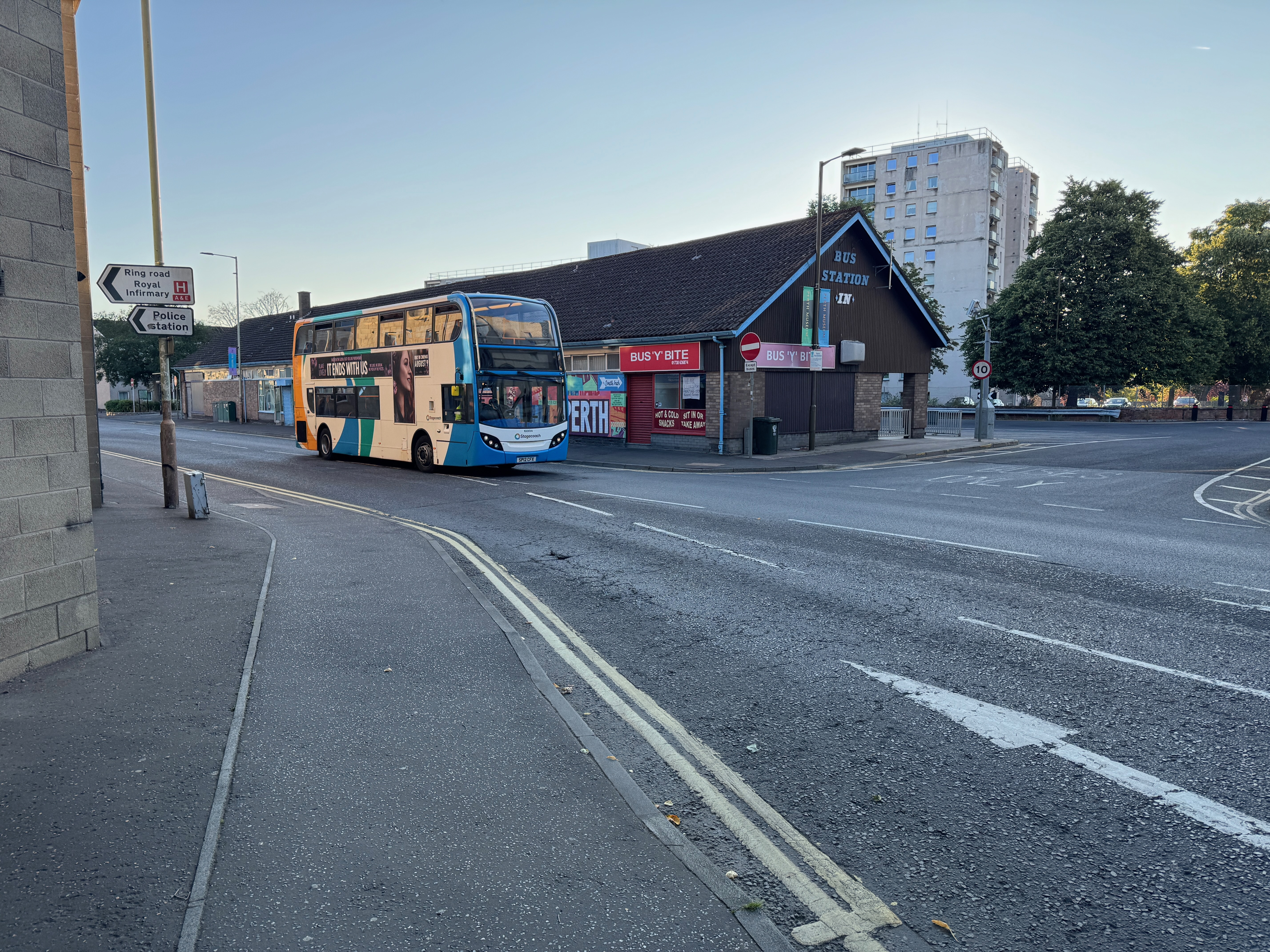
- Stagecoach East Scotland's number 57 arriving at the station in 2024

General information
- Location: Leonard Street, Perth, Scotland
- Coordinates: 56.3935°N 3.4370°W
- Operator: Perth and Kinross Council
- Bus operators: Stagecoach; Scottish Citylink; Docherty's Midland Coaches
- Connections: Perth railway station (100 metres (110 yd))
Location
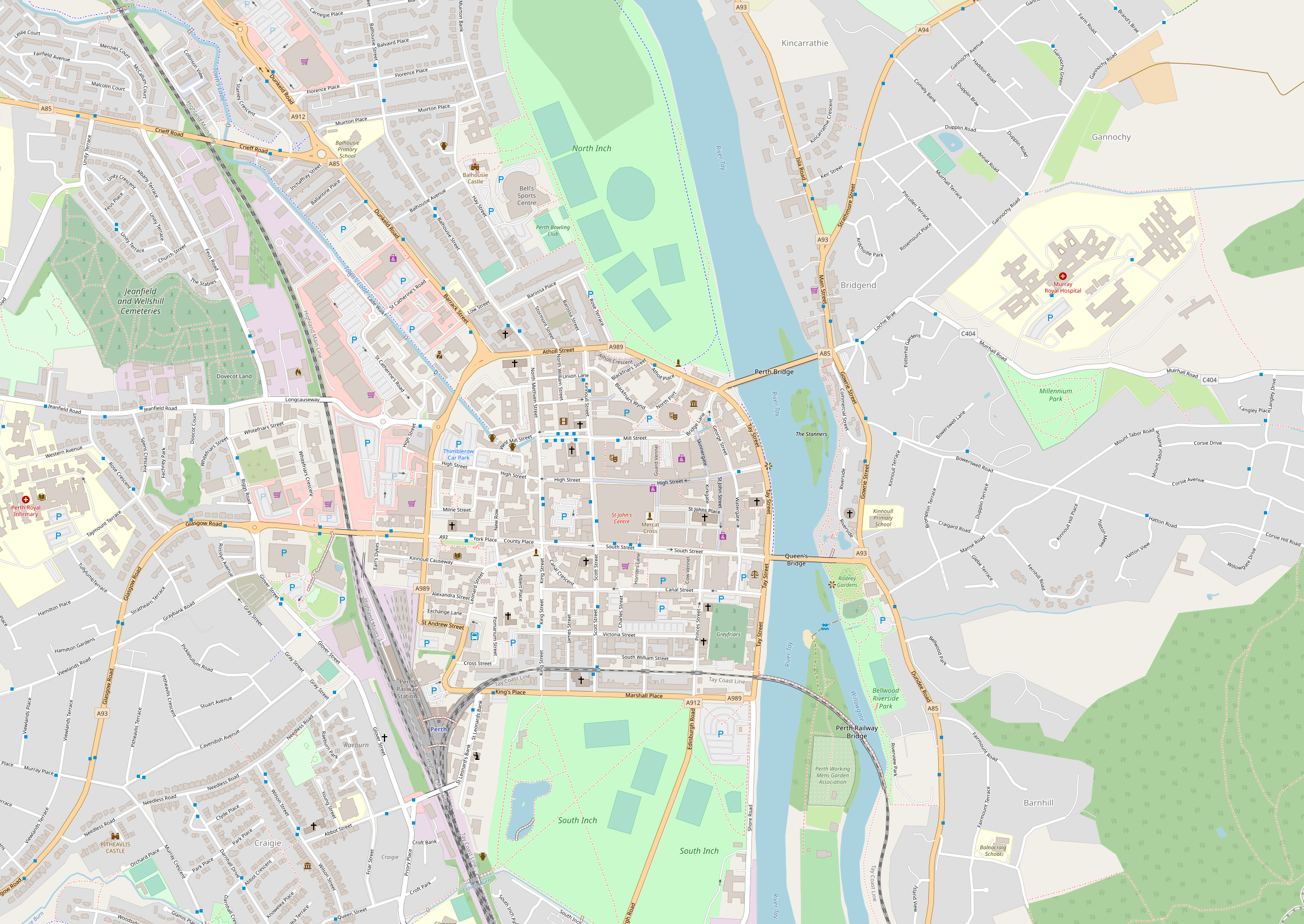
- Location within Perth

Perth bus station is located on Leonard Street in Perth, Scotland. It is owned by Perth and Kinross Council and is situated approximately 800 metres from the city centre, and 100 metres from Perth railway station. The station is mostly used for out-of-town routes, while routes in and around Perth originate and terminate on Mill Street.

== History ==
=== Pomarium Street ===
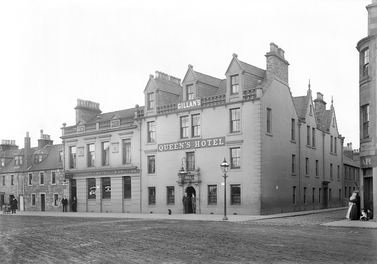
The bar of the original incarnation of the Queens Hotel, and the other buildings on the northern side of the hotel, were demolished in the 1950s to make way for the bus station

The middle section of Pomarium Street, which looped off and back onto Leonard Street, was demolished in the 1950s to make way for the bus station and adjacent flats. Pomarium recalls the site of the orchard of Perth Charterhouse which seems to have survived into the 18th century. Part of Pomarium Street still exists today.

=== Ticket office ===
The ticket office, formerly staffed by Scottish Citylink personnel, closed on 28 June 2019. At the time, the company stated this was due to most services now stopping at Broxden Park & Ride rather than the bus station, and that more people are purchasing tickets online.

== Amenities ==
A McColl's convenience store formerly occupied part of the premises. After surviving the 2019 closures endured by two of the city's four branches, it too closed shortly afterwards. The Bus'Y'Bite café has been part of the premises since the late 1990s.

== Services ==
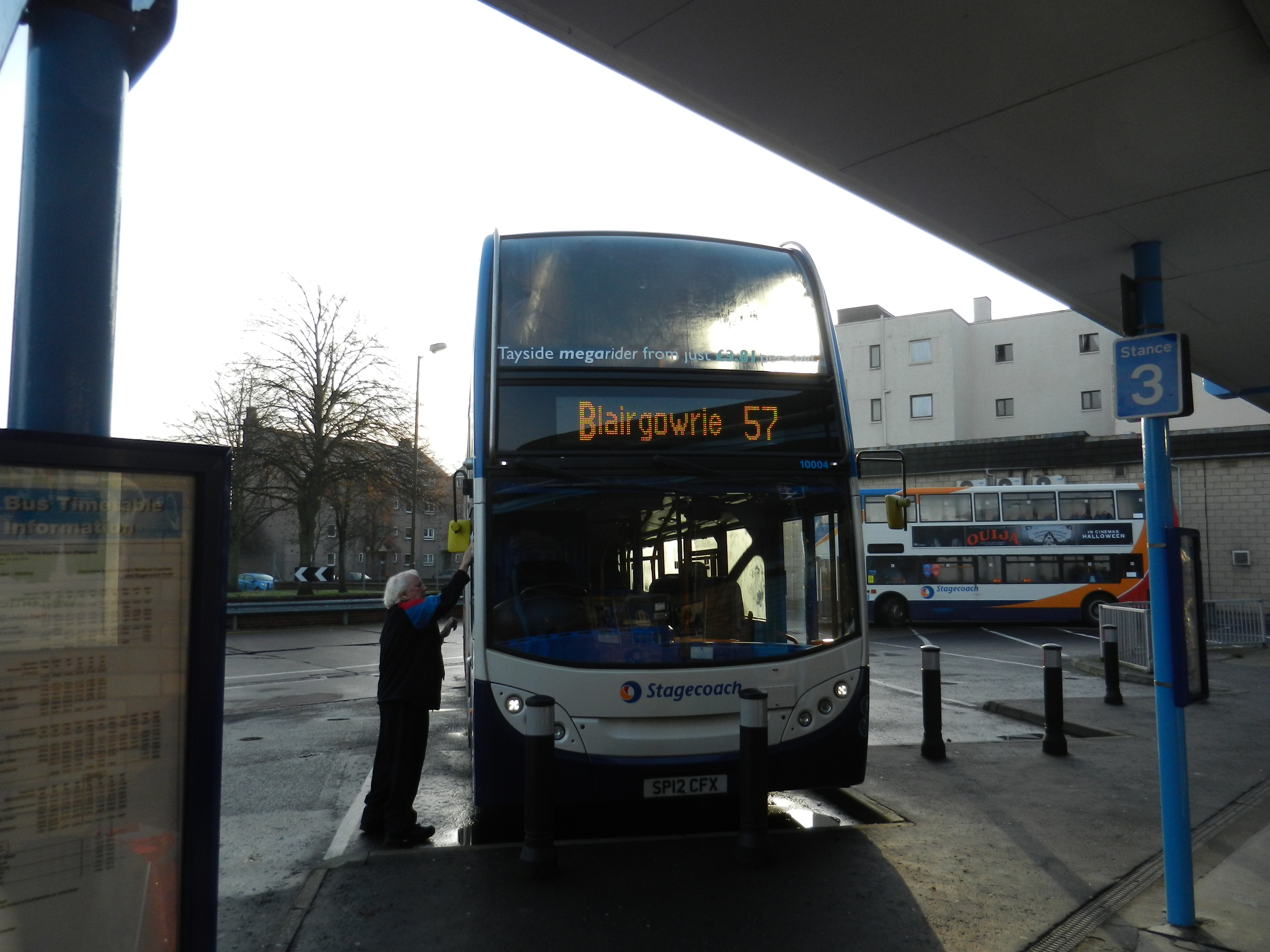
A Stagecoach Strathtay Enviro 400 bus, bound for Blairgowrie, at the station in 2014

The station sees services operated by Stagecoach, Scottish Citylink, and Docherty's Midland Coaches. Some buses, including the X7 Coastrider, do not stop at the bus station and instead terminate at Perth Royal Infirmary.

The bus station, which has ten stands, is located on Leonard Street, part of the A989, providing easy outlets to the west via the Glasgow Road (A93), which leads to Broxden Interchange.

== Future ==
Proposals were first considered in 2004 to redevelop the bus station, relocating it to create a transport interchange with the nearby railway station. In 2017, talks were ongoing between the council, Abellio ScotRail, and Network Rail on redeveloping the bus and railway stations. The following year, letters from the council to local businesses in the area again suggested that the station may close for redevelopment.

In 2023, around £50 million of funding was secured to improve Perth's railway station and bus station.

== See also ==
- Public transport in Perth and Kinross
