= Andrew Heiton =

Scottish architect (1823–1894)

- Heiton in the late 19th century
- Born: 3 April 1823; Inchture, Perth and Kinross, Scotland
- Died: 3 March 1894 (aged 70); Perth, Perth and Kinross, Scotland
- Occupation: Architect
- Awards: FRIBA

Andrew Heiton (3 April 1823 – 3 March 1894) was a Scottish architect. He designed several notable buildings in Scotland, mostly railway stations and country houses.

== Early life ==
Heiton was born in Inchture, Perth and Kinross, the son of Andrew Heiton, another architect, and Janet Lorimer. He had at least one brother, the younger Thomas Arthur Heiton.

== Career ==
Heiton served as an apprentice under his father, who had moved to Perth. He then worked with William Burn and David Bryce in Edinburgh, before returning to practice with his father in the mid-1840s. John Murray Robertson became their apprentice in the mid-19th century. The duo built or added to several railway stations, including that of Stirling and Perth. They also served as Perth City Architects from 1856, succeeding William Macdonald Mackenzie. Heiton Jr. continued alone after the death of his father on 8 August 1858.

He inherited Darnick estate, in the Scottish Borders, restoring its 16th-century tower.

Heiton was admitted as a Fellow of the Royal Institute of British Architects (FRIBA) on 23 June 1879, his proposers being John Honeyman, John Baird and James Salmon.

=== Notable works ===
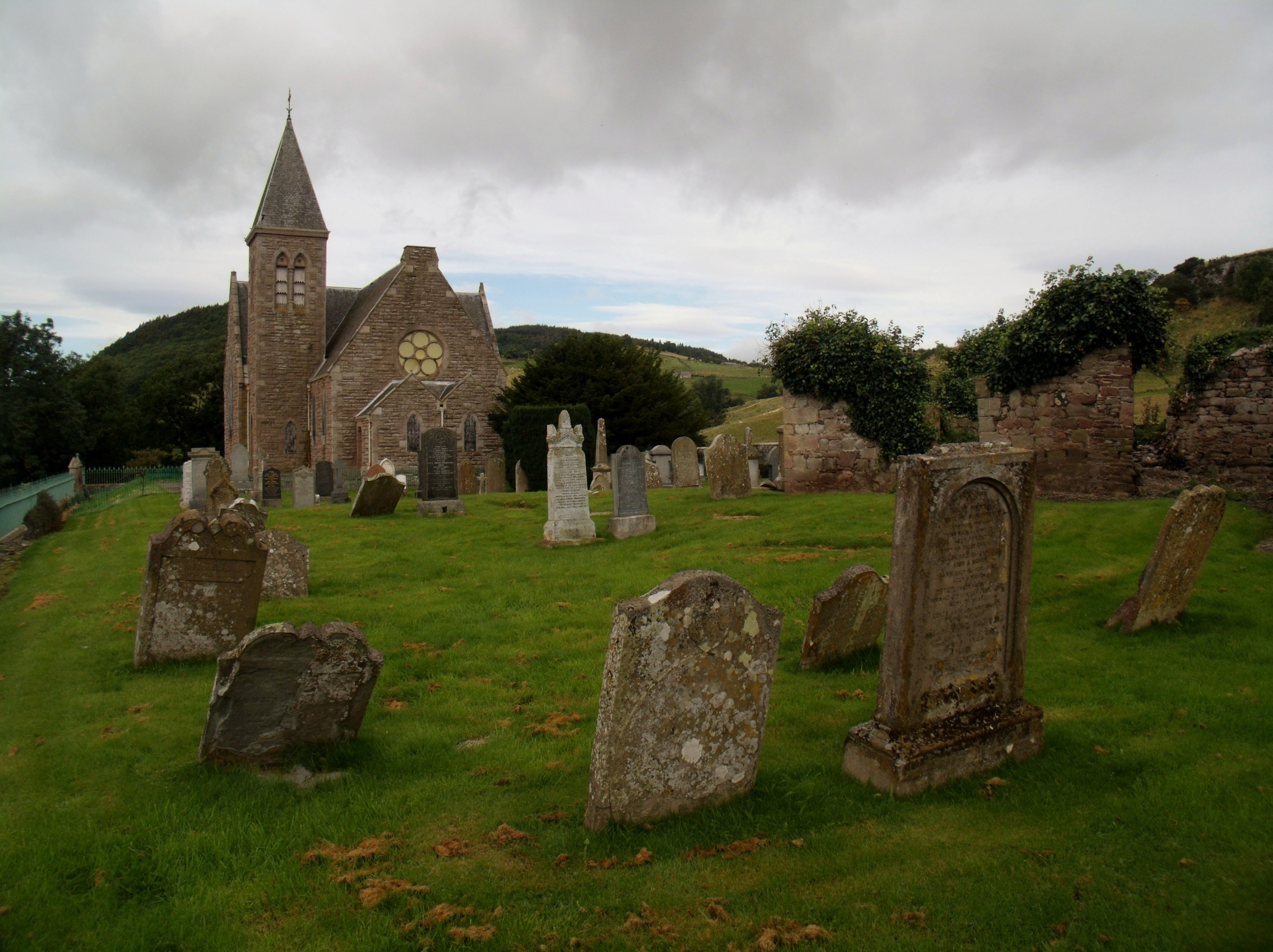
Kinfauns Parish Church

- Perth railway station (addition of a two-storey extension to the north of the main block, 1854)
- Stirling railway station (1848)
- Abbey Presbyterian Church, Dublin (1864)
- Castelroy, Broughty Ferry (1867)
- St Mary's Monastery, Kinnoull (1868)
- Kinfauns Parish Church (1869; with John Murray Robertson)
- Craigievar and Darnick (1870), Kinnoull
- Greig Institute, Leven (1872)
- Victoria Buildings, Perth (1872)
- 26 Tay Street, Perth (c. 1873)
- Vogrie House, Midlothian (1875)
- Station Hotel, Perth (1885)
- St Andrew's Church, Perth (1885)
- Fonab Castle, Perth and Kinross (1892)

== Personal life ==
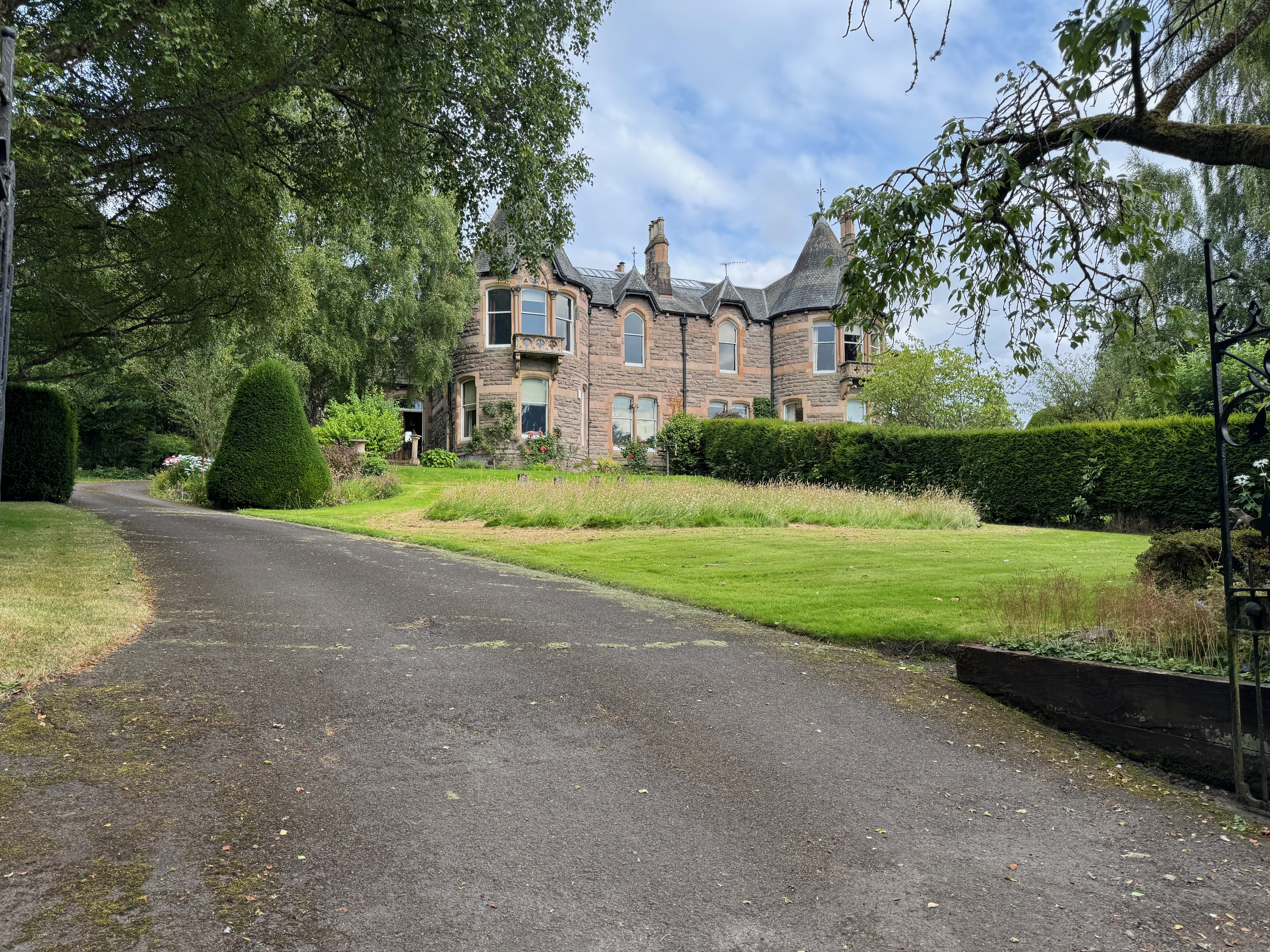
Craigievar and Darnick (2024)

In 1870, Heiton's self-designed double villa, Craigievar and Darnick, on Perth's Kinnoull Terrace, was completed.

== Death ==
Heiton died in Perth in 1894, aged 70. He is buried in Greyfriars Burial Ground, just off the city's Tay Street, where several of his works still stand. His headstone was one of several removed and restored in 2019.

His practice was taken on by his nephew Andrew Heiton Granger, who switched around his name to become Andrew Granger Heiton.
