= Victoria Buildings =

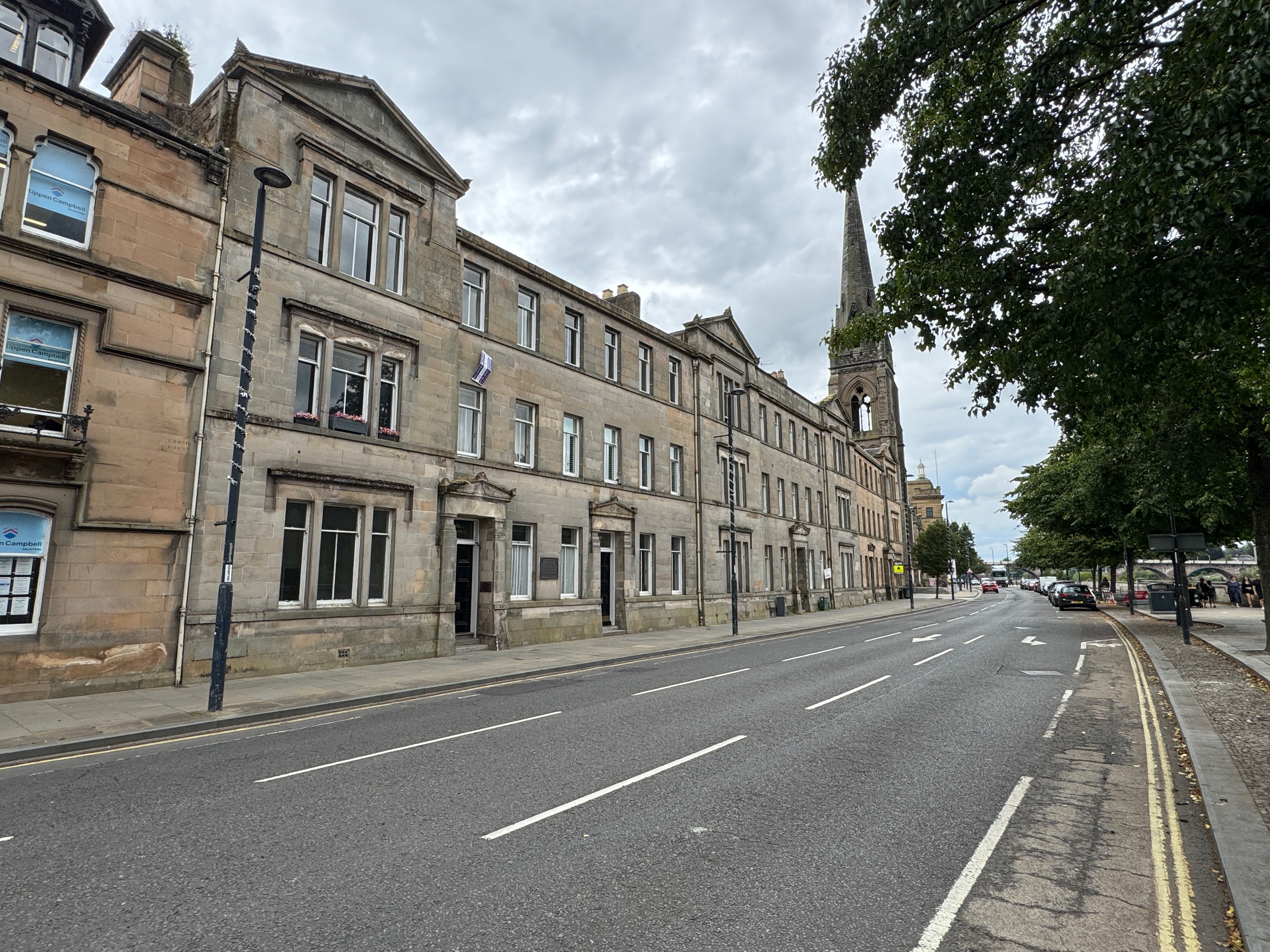
- The buildings in 2024

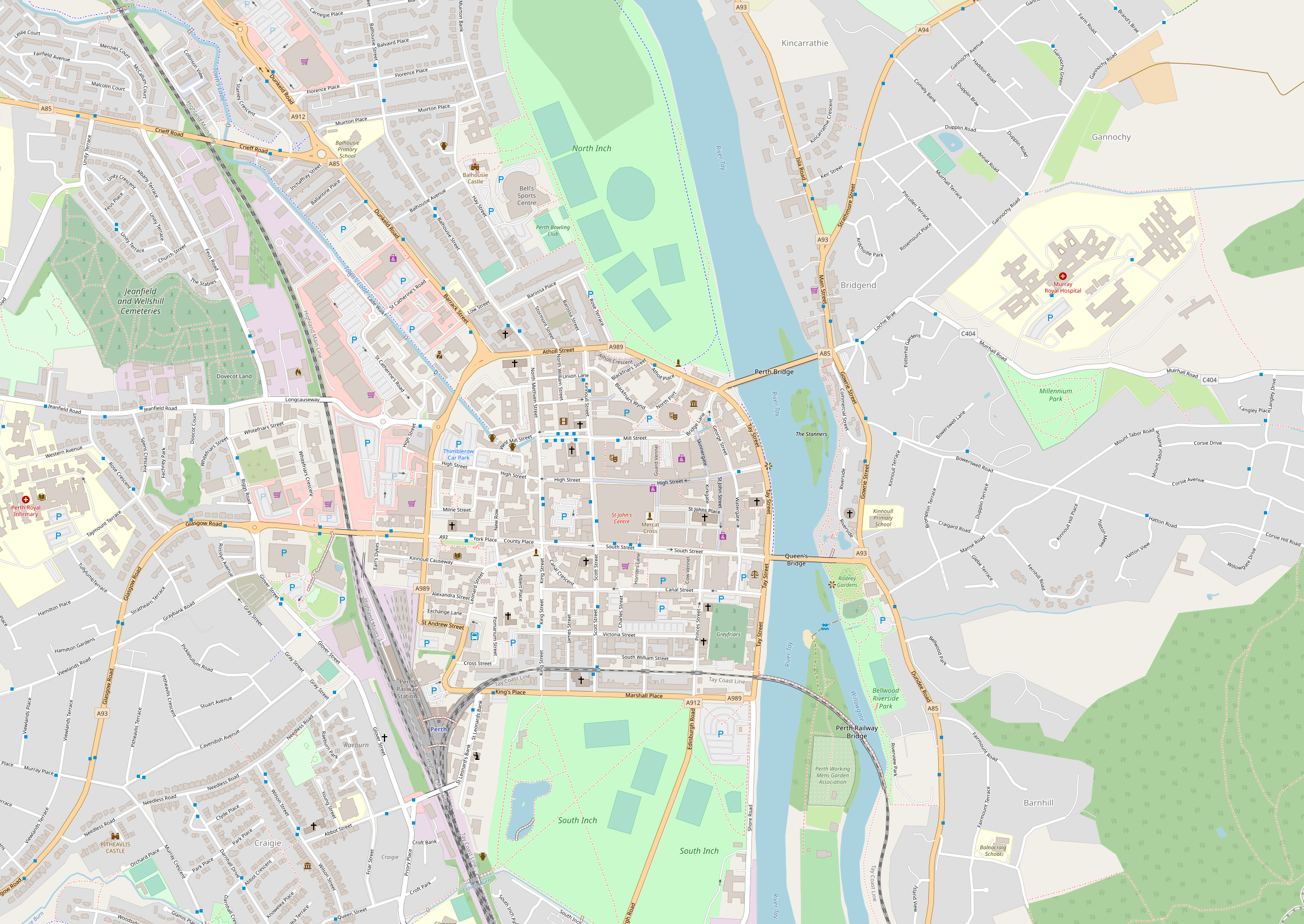
- Shown in Perth
- 56.3957°N 3.4258°W
- Location: 36–44 Tay Street, Perth

History
- Built: 1872 (154 years ago)

Site notes
- Architect: Andrew Heiton
- Architectural style: Greek Revival

Listed Building – Category B
- Designated: 20 May 1965
- Reference no.: LB39656

The Victoria Buildings is an historic row of buildings in Perth, Scotland. Designed by local architect Andrew Heiton, the building is Category B listed, dating to 1872. Standing on Tay Street, immediately south of St Matthew's Church, the building was the "birthplace" of General Accident Fire & Life Assurance Corporation.

Architect David Smart had his offices at number 42.

== See also ==
- List of listed buildings in Perth, Scotland
