= Kinnoull =

Parish in Perth, Scotland

Coordinates: 56.403°N 3.418°W

- Kinnoull's Gannochy duck pond in 2019

- Location within Perth and Kinross
- OS grid reference: NO1224
- Council area: Perth and Kinross
- Lieutenancy area: Perth and Kinross
- Country: Scotland
- Sovereign state: United Kingdom
- Post town: PERTH
- Postcode district: PH2
- Dialling code: 01738
- Police: Scotland
- Fire: Scottish
- Ambulance: Scottish
- UK Parliament: Perth and Kinross-shire
- Scottish Parliament: Perth

Kinnoull is a parish in Perth, Perth and Kinross, Scotland, approximately 1/2 mile (800 m) northeast of Perth city centre. Beginning at the level of the River Tay, which separates the parish from Perth, Kinnoull's terrain continues to rise as it continues southeast, culminating in Kinnoull Hill, the summit of which is at 222 m (728 ft).

The main access roads to Kinnoull from the centre of Perth are Strathmore Street (the A94) and Muirhall Road, both in Bridgend.

== History ==
The Hay family were early landowners in the area. In 1633, Sir George Hay, lord chancellor of Scotland, was made Earl of Kinnoull by Charles I. He died the following year, aged 64, and was interred at Kinnoull Parish Church, in which a monument was erected in his honour.

Kinnoull Castle formerly stood on the banks of the Tay in the Barnhill area of Kinnoull. The area is now a garden.

== Architecture ==
Although the area is largely residential, Kinnoull is also the home of St Mary's Monastery, which was established in 1869 as the first Roman Catholic monastery to be built in Scotland since the Reformation.

=== Gannochy ===
The Robert Matthew Mitchell-designed Gannochy Housing Estate part of Kinnoull was founded by Arthur Kinmond Bell in 1922, when he purchased a large plot of land. At its lower western end, a portion of ground was left for recreational purposes. A duck pond, tennis court and curling pond were constructed adjacent to the Kinnoull Recreation Grounds on Muirhall Terrace. The pond still remains, but the tennis court and curling pond have been grassed over and bounded on three sides by a copse of trees. This grassed area, now known as the Curly, can be accessed via a stile gate off Annat Road.

==== Duck pond ====
Gannochy duck pond is located at the junction of Annat and Dupplin Roads. (Dupplin Road is named for Viscount Dupplin, the early styling of Thomas Hay, 9th Earl of Kinnoull.) In addition to its main inhabitants, it is home to mute swans.

=== Kinnoull Terrace ===
Kinnoull Terrace, a cul-de-sac just above the Dundee Road, is home to four villas and one double villa, all of listed status.

== Sport ==
Kinnoull has its own bowling club and adjacent tennis clubs, both established in 1887 as Kinnoull Recreation Club and located on Muirhall Terrace. The tennis club received a Clubmark accreditation in November 2009. Kinnoull Bowling Club is one of the 33 member clubs of Bowls Scotland's District 6.

Perth Doo'cot Cricket Club was established in 2012. It plays its home fixtures at Perth Doo'cot Park, on Pitcullen Crescent, which was created by A. K. Bell in 1925. Its season runs from mid-May to the end of August.

Perth Archery Club, which is also based at Doo'cot Park, was founded in 2010.

== Notable people ==
- W. H. Findlay, photographer
- Effie Gray, wife of the critic John Ruskin, is buried in the Kinnoull Parish Church churchyard
- John Hunt, theologian
- James Walter Fairholme, Royal Navy officer and polar explorer lost during the Franklin Expedition

== Gallery ==
Kinnoull Bowling Club, viewed from Muirhall Terrace in 2019

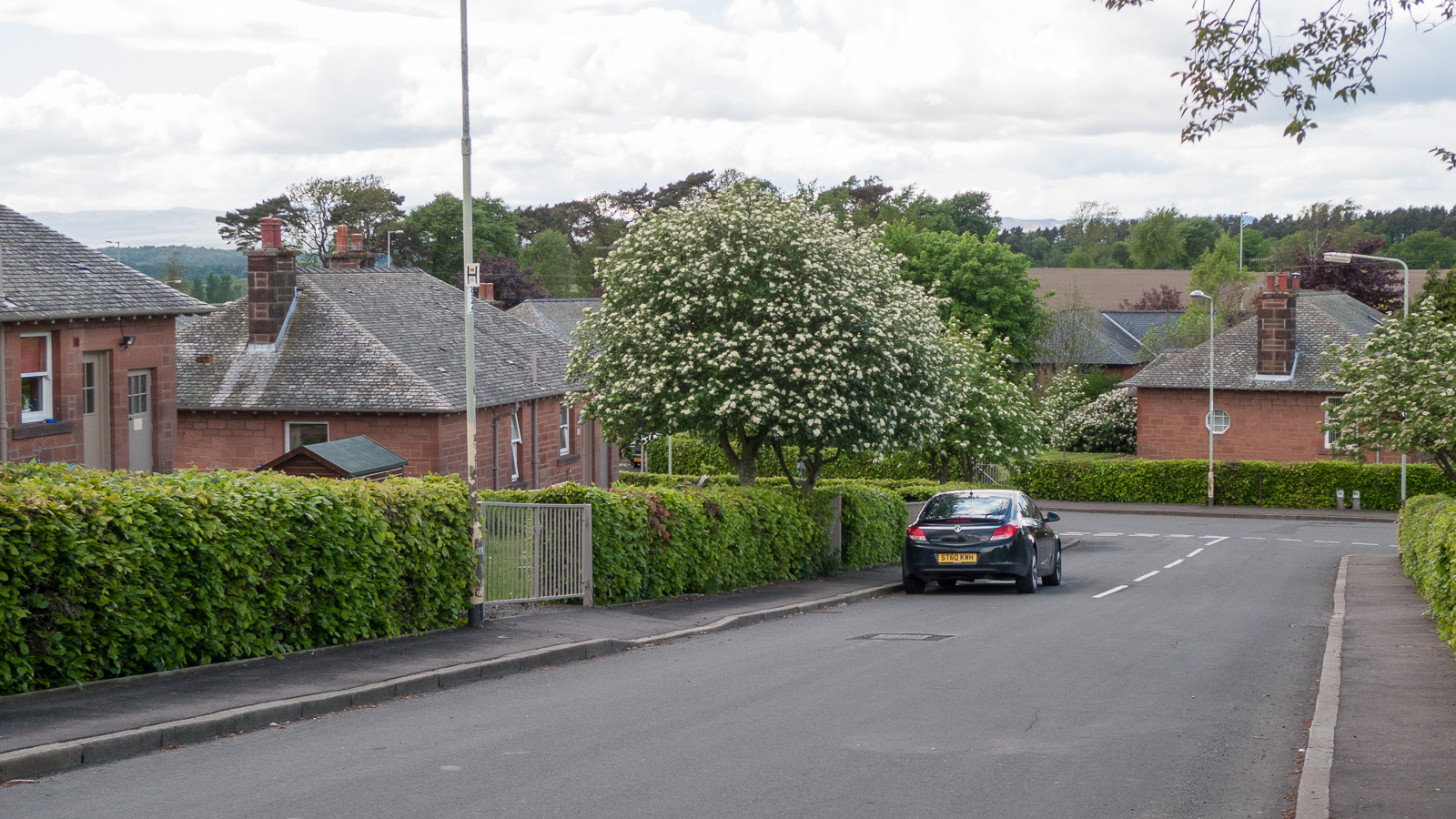
Typical housing in the Gannochy estate

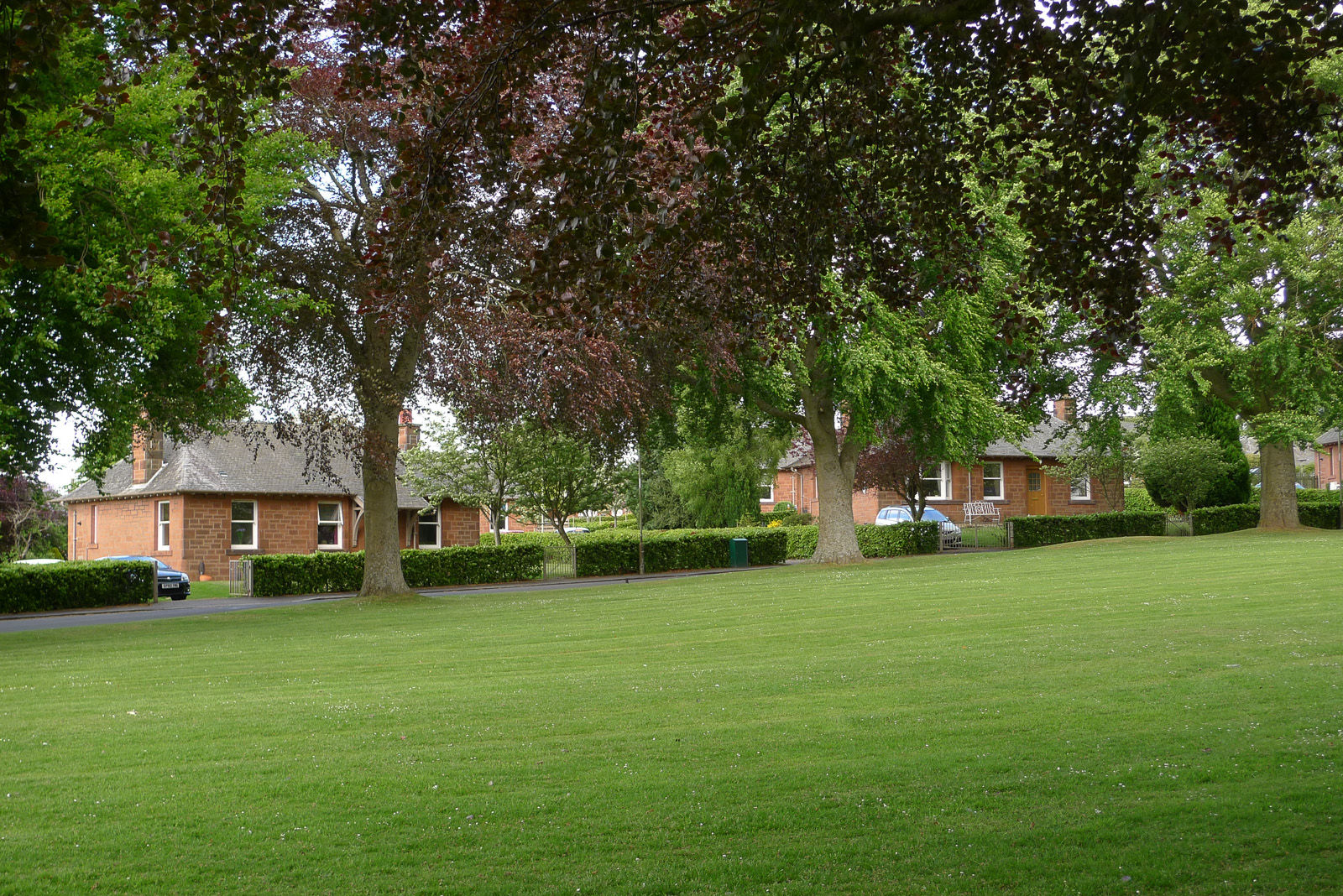
Gannochy Green
