= List of listed buildings in Perth, Scotland =

This is a list of listed buildings in the parish of Perth, Scotland.

== List ==
All entries, addresses and coordinates are based on data from Historic Scotland. This data falls under the Open Government Licence

Name	Location	Date listed	Grid ref. (Note: Sometimes known as OSGB36, the grid reference (where provided) is based on the British national grid reference system used by the Ordnance Survey. • "Guide to National Grid". Ordnance Survey. • "Get-a-map". Ordnance Survey.)	Geo-coordinates	Notes	LB number (Note: Historic Environment Scotland assign a unique alphanumeric identifier to each designated site in Scotland, for listed buildings this always begins with "LB", for example "LB12345".)	Image
10 St Leonard's Bank, Including Boundary Walls				56°23′24″N 3°26′14″W	Category B	39631	Upload Photo
South Street 43–53 (N. Side). (Odd Numbers)				56°23′43″N 3°25′43″W	Category B	39638	Upload Photo
South Street 75–81 (Odd Numbers) Salvation Army Hall And 30–36 King Edward Street (Even Numbers)				56°23′43″N 3°25′47″W	Category C(S)	39640	Upload Photo
Stormont Street, 6				56°24′00″N 3°26′01″W	Category C(S)	39652	Upload Photo
Tay Street, 26, Savings Bank				56°23′47″N 3°25′34″W	Category B	39655	Upload another image See more images
39–45 (Odd Nos) Victoria Street, Including Boundary Wall				56°23′37″N 3°26′01″W	Category C(S)	39659	Upload Photo
Watergate, 81				56°23′43″N 3°25′37″W	Category C(S)	39662	Upload Photo
1–9 (Odd Nos) York Place And 41–45 (Odd Nos) New Row				56°23′44″N 3°26′11″W	Category B	39665	Upload another image
27 (Inglelowe) And 29 (Hollybrook) Wilson Street, Including Boundary Walls, Gates And Railings				56°23′19″N 3°26′37″W	Category B	39666	Upload Photo
1–14 (Inclusive Nos) Marshall Place And 2 And 4 Nelson Street Including Boundary Walls And Railings				56°23′32″N 3°25′45″W	Category B	39552	Upload another image
15–28 (Inclusive Nos) Marshall Place, 1 And 3 Nelson Street And 110 Scott Street Including Boundary Walls And Railings				56°23′32″N 3°25′53″W	Category B	39553	Upload Photo
46–50 (Even Nos) South Methven Street				56°23′45″N 3°26′03″W	Category C(S)	39576	Upload Photo
Rose Terrace, 8–12 (All Numbers)				56°24′01″N 3°25′58″W	Category B	39597	Upload another image
St John's Place, 4 & 29 Kirkgate				56°23′46″N 3°25′41″W	Category C(S)	39601	Upload Photo
St John Street, (W. Side) 3, 5				56°23′47″N 3°25′40″W	Category B	39604	Upload Photo
St John Street (W. Side) 15				56°23′47″N 3°25′40″W	Category B	39606	Upload Photo
High Street 21–31 (N. Side) (Odd Numbers)				56°23′49″N 3°25′39″W	Category B	39463	Upload Photo
Isla Road Boatlands, Lodge And Garden Walls				56°24′22″N 3°25′35″W	Category C(S)	39487	Upload Photo
Isla Road Springland Boathouse				56°24′30″N 3°25′47″W	Category B	39489	Upload Photo
28, 30 And 32 James Street And 70A, 70B And 72 Victoria Street				56°23′36″N 3°25′59″W	Category B	39492	Upload Photo
31 James Street ("Stormont") Including Boundary Walls				56°23′34″N 3°26′01″W	Category C(S)	39499	Upload Photo
37 King Street, Including Boundary Wall				56°23′37″N 3°26′02″W	Category C(S)	39509	Upload Photo
49, 51 And 51A King Street, Including Boundary Wall				56°23′34″N 3°26′02″W	Category C(S)	39513	Upload another image
Kinnoull Street 31, 33 (E. Side)				56°23′51″N 3°25′56″W	Category C(S)	39525	Upload Photo
6–12 (Even Nos) Kinnoull Street				56°23′49″N 3°25′58″W	Category C(S)	39529	Upload Photo
Leonard Street, Royal British House				56°23′33″N 3°26′15″W	Category C(S)	39539	Upload Photo
Low Road Pitheavlis Cottages				56°23′07″N 3°27′54″W	Category B	39540	Upload Photo
Main Prison Block				56°23′08″N 3°25′47″W	Category A	39331	Upload another image
1, 3 South Street And 54 Tay Street, Tay River Purification Board				56°23′42″N 3°25′35″W	Category B	39333	Upload another image
Albert, Prince Consort, Statue To, North Inch				56°23′57″N 3°25′45″W	Category B	39336	Upload another image
South Inch At Foot Of King Street, Statue To Sir Walter Scott				56°23′31″N 3°26′04″W	Category C(S)	39337	Upload another image
Balhousie Castle, Hay Street, (Museum For Black Watch Regiment)				56°24′12″N 3°26′12″W	Category B	39345	Upload another image
Kincarrathie House, Cricket Pavilion				56°24′23″N 3°25′17″W	Category B	39350	Upload Photo
Atholl Place, 1–6 (All Numbers)				56°23′57″N 3°25′49″W	Category B	39355	Upload Photo
Atholl Place, 7 And 2 Blackfriars Street				56°23′57″N 3°25′49″W	Category B	39356	Upload Photo
Atholl Street 14–18 (N. Side) (Even Numbers)				56°23′59″N 3°25′59″W	Category C(S)	39363	Upload Photo
Barossa Place 1, 3, 5				56°24′05″N 3°25′59″W	Category B	39369	Upload Photo
Barossa Place, 11				56°24′04″N 3°26′02″W	Category C(S)	39372	Upload Photo
Barossa Place 27				56°24′03″N 3°26′08″W	Category B	39379	Upload Photo
Barossa Place 10				56°24′02″N 3°26′02″W	Category B	39382	Upload Photo
Dundee Road And Corner Of Manse Road Manse Of Kinnoull				56°23′39″N 3°25′13″W	Category C(S)	39417	Upload Photo
Dundee Road 101				56°23′21″N 3°25′10″W	Category C(S)	39421	Upload Photo
Edinburgh Road Friar Inn				56°22′40″N 3°25′54″W	Canmore link	39427	Upload Photo
Friarton Road Nether Friarton House				56°22′38″N 3°25′43″W	Category C(S)	39430	Upload Photo
George Street 1, 3 (E Side)				56°23′49″N 3°25′37″W	Category C(S)	39431	Upload Photo
George Street 15–21 (E Side) Conservative Club (Odd Numbers)				56°23′50″N 3°25′37″W	Category B	39434	Upload Photo
King Street, Former St Leonard's Parish Church				56°23′39″N 3°26′06″W	Category B	39309	Upload another image
Perth Royal Infirmary, Nurses Home With Recreation Room And Including Boundary Walls, Gatepiers And Gates				56°23′43″N 3°27′04″W	Category C(S)	50580	Upload Photo
Isla Road, Meadowland				56°24′21″N 3°25′36″W	Category C(S)	50797	Upload Photo
Glasgow Road, West Woodlands, Henhouse				56°23′21″N 3°28′16″W	Category C(S)	50825	Upload Photo
Glasgow Road, West Woodlands, Laundry				56°23′21″N 3°28′19″W	Category C(S)	50827	Upload Photo
7 South St John's Place				56°23′44″N 3°25′43″W	Category C(S)	51355	Upload Photo
25–31 (Odd Nos) York Place, Including Boundary Wall (Waverley Hotel)				56°23′44″N 3°26′18″W	Damaged by fire in 2011; later demolished	51737	Upload Photo
6 St Leonard's Bank, Including Boundary Walls And Gatepiers				56°23′28″N 3°26′13″W	Category B	39627	Upload Photo
South Street (S Side) 20–24 (Even Numbers)				56°23′42″N 3°25′38″W	Category B	39644	Upload Photo
Tay Street, 36–44 Victoria Buildings (Even Numbers)				56°23′44″N 3°25′33″W	Category B	39656	Upload another image
Viewlands Road, Viewlands House/General Accident Assurance Corporation, Training College				56°23′32″N 3°27′20″W	Category B	39660	Upload Photo
57 And 58 West Mill Street				56°23′52″N 3°26′07″W	Category C(S)	39664	Upload Photo
Main Street Newlands Bridgend				56°24′02″N 3°25′27″W	Category B	39543	Upload Photo
Main Street Inveraven Bridgend				56°24′03″N 3°25′28″W	Category B	39544	Upload another image
Main Street Riversdale Bridgend				56°24′04″N 3°25′29″W	Category C(S)	39545	Upload Photo
Main Street, Lodge Bridgend Ardchoille, Formerly Rosemount Now Perth And Kinross District Police Headquarters				56°24′08″N 3°25′21″W	Category C(S)	39551	Upload another image
73–79 (Odd Nos) South Methven Street And 1 County Place				56°23′44″N 3°26′05″W	Category C(S)	39574	Upload Photo
34–44 (Even Nos) South Methven Street				56°23′45″N 3°26′03″W	Category C(S)	39575	Upload Photo
North Port, 2 – 6 (Even Numbers)				56°23′55″N 3°25′44″W	Category C(S)	39585	Upload Photo
33 And 35 Princes Street And 30 Canal Street				56°23′39″N 3°25′43″W	Category C(S)	39589	Upload Photo
30–36 (Even Nos) Princes Street, (Former Star Bar)				56°23′37″N 3°25′41″W	Category C(S)	39592	Upload Photo
Rose Terrace, 1–5 (All Numbers)				56°24′00″N 3°25′56″W	Category B	39596	Upload Photo
St John Street, (W. Side) 27–33 (Odd Numbers)				56°23′43″N 3°25′40″W	Category B	39609	Upload Photo
St John Street (E. Side) 2, 4 And 36, 40 High Street				56°23′48″N 3°25′38″W	Category B	39611	Upload Photo
St John Street, (E. Side) 26–30 (Even Numbers)				56°23′46″N 3°25′38″W	Category B	39614	Upload Photo
George Street 16, 18, 20 (W Side)				56°23′50″N 3°25′39″W	Category C(S)	39445	Upload Photo
George Street 62, 64 (W Side) And 2 Bridge Lane				56°23′53″N 3°25′41″W	Category C(S)	39452	Upload Photo
High Street 33–37 (N Side) (Odd Nos)				56°23′49″N 3°25′40″W	Category B	39464	Upload Photo
High Street 39–43 (N Side) (Odd Numbers)				56°23′49″N 3°25′41″W	Category C(S)	39465	Upload Photo
High Street 45–53 (N Side) (Odd Numbers)				56°23′49″N 3°25′41″W	Category C(S)	39466	Upload Photo
Isla Road 1–4 Mansfield Place (All Numbers)				56°24′11″N 3°25′29″W	Category B	39485	Upload Photo
Isla Road Springland Fernhouse Well				56°24′29″N 3°25′44″W	Category C(S)	39490	Upload Photo
34–40 (Even Nos) James Street				56°23′35″N 3°25′59″W	Category C(S)	39493	Upload Photo
3 And 4 Graham's Place, King Street, Including Boundary Walls				56°23′39″N 3°26′02″W	Category B	39507	Upload Photo
20 King Street, Including Boundary Wall				56°23′37″N 3°26′06″W	Category C(S)	39519	Upload Photo
King Edward Street 22, 24, 26				56°23′44″N 3°25′47″W	Category C(S)	39523	Upload Photo
'L' Block (Former Hospital Block) North Square				56°23′11″N 3°25′51″W	Category B	39329	Upload Photo
Leonard Street, Perth Railway Station Including Carriage Shed And Gatepiers				56°23′32″N 3°26′23″W	Category B	39340	Upload another image
Craigie Primary School, Abbots Road				56°23′22″N 3°26′31″W	Category C(S)	39342	Upload Photo
Pitheavlis Castle, 58 Needless Road				56°23′20″N 3°27′03″W	Category A	39346	Upload another image See more images
Kincarrathie Doocot				56°24′25″N 3°25′22″W	Category B	39351	Upload Photo
Atholl Street 4 (N. Side)				56°23′59″N 3°25′56″W	Category B	39361	Upload Photo
Barossa Place 25 And 5 Hay Street				56°24′03″N 3°26′07″W	Category B	39378	Upload Photo
18 Charlotte Street				56°23′55″N 3°25′43″W	Category B	39400	Upload Photo
Dundee Road Bellwood Cottage				56°23′36″N 3°25′13″W	Category C(S)	39419	Upload Photo
Dundee Road Barnhill Tollhouse				56°22′57″N 3°24′49″W	Category A	39422	Upload another image See more images
Kinnoull Parish Church, Dundee Road				56°23′45″N 3°25′21″W	Category B	39304	Upload Photo
St Matthew's (formerly West) Church, Tay Street				56°23′46″N 3°25′35″W	Category B	39312	Upload another image
Hospital Street, King Street And Albert Place, Former King James VI Hospital Including Boundary Walls				56°23′41″N 3°26′06″W	Category A	39319	Upload another image See more images
The Old Academy, 6, 7 Rose Terrace				56°24′01″N 3°25′57″W	Category A	39322	Upload another image See more images
Glasgow Road, West Woodlands, Coach House				56°23′21″N 3°28′18″W	Category C(S)	50826	Upload Photo
5 And 7 King Street, Including St Andrew Lodge				56°23′42″N 3°26′03″W	Category C(S)	51364	Upload another image
60 And 62 Princes Street				56°23′35″N 3°25′41″W	Category C(S)	51367	Upload Photo
2–16 (Even Nos) North Methven Street And 54 And 56 West Mill Street				56°23′52″N 3°26′06″W	Category C(S)	51378	Upload Photo
37–43 Scott Street And 141 And 143 South Street				56°23′43″N 3°25′57″W	Category C(S)	51640	Upload Photo
South Street, 89–95 (N. Side) (Odd Numbers)				56°23′43″N 3°25′50″W	Category B	39641	Upload Photo
South Street 26–32 (S. Side) (Even Numbers)				56°23′42″N 3°25′39″W	Category B	39645	Upload Photo
30–36 South Street, Salutation Hotel				56°23′42″N 3°25′40″W	Category B	39646	Upload another image
220 South Street And 17 Canal Crescent				56°23′43″N 3°26′03″W	Category B	39648	Upload Photo
Stormont Street, 8				56°24′00″N 3°26′01″W	Category C(S)	39653	Upload Photo
62–72 (Even Nos) Tay Street, Including Former Museum				56°23′37″N 3°25′35″W	Category B	39658	Upload Photo
Watergate, 21–31 (Odd Numbers)				56°23′47″N 3°25′37″W	Category C(S)	39661	Upload Photo
Melville Street, 7–11 (Odd Numbers)				56°23′59″N 3°26′05″W	Category C(S)	39555	Upload Photo
Melville Street 26				56°24′01″N 3°26′11″W	Category C(S)	39561	Upload Photo
Melville Street 26 Domestic Building At Rear Of Above				56°24′01″N 3°26′11″W	Category C(S)	39562	Upload Photo
37–41 (Odd Nos) North Methven Street				56°23′55″N 3°26′04″W	Category C(S)	39565	Upload Photo
West Mill Street, Lower City Mills, Tourist Information Centre				56°23′51″N 3°26′08″W	Category A	39578	Upload another image See more images
55 Princes Street, Greyfriars House				56°23′38″N 3°25′46″W	Category C(S)	39591	Upload Photo
Rose Terrace, 13–16 (All Numbers)				56°24′03″N 3°25′59″W	Category B	39598	Upload Photo
St John's Place, 9, 10				56°23′46″N 3°25′43″W	Category B	39603	Upload Photo
St John Street (W. Side) 7–13 (Odd Numbers)				56°23′47″N 3°25′40″W	Category B	39605	Upload Photo
St John Street (W Side) 35–39 (Odd Numbers)				56°23′43″N 3°25′40″W	Category B	39610	Upload Photo
St John Street (E. Side) 10–16 (Even Numbers)				56°23′47″N 3°25′38″W	Category B	39612	Upload Photo
St John Street, (E. Side) 42, 44				56°23′45″N 3°25′38″W	Category B	39617	Upload another image
St John Street, (E. Side) 58, 60				56°23′44″N 3°25′38″W	Category B	39619	Upload Photo
5 St Leonard's Bank, Including Boundary Walls And Outbuilding				56°23′28″N 3°26′12″W	Category B	39626	Upload Photo
George Street 22, 24 (W Side) Bank Of Scotland Buildings, (Formerly The Union Bank)				56°23′50″N 3°25′40″W	Category B	39446	Upload Photo
George Street 50, 52 (W Side)				56°23′52″N 3°25′41″W	Category C(S)	39450	Upload Photo
177–187 (Odd Numbers) High Street, Perth Theatre				56°23′49″N 3°25′55″W	Category B	39468	Upload another image
High Street And Corner Of Tay Street, General Accident Fire And Life Assurance Corporation, World Headquarters				56°23′48″N 3°25′34″W	Category B	39469	Upload another image
High Street 70–74 (S Side) (Even Numbers)				56°23′47″N 3°25′43″W	Category B	39476	Upload Photo
Isla Road Boatlands				56°24′24″N 3°25′37″W	Category B	39486	Upload Photo
35–49 (Odd Nos) Kinnoull Street, 1 Mill Street, Union Street (South Side) Former Pullars Dyeworks				56°23′52″N 3°25′54″W	Category B	39526	Upload Photo
Kinnoull Terrace Craigievar and Darnick				56°23′49″N 3°25′12″W	Category B	39536	Upload another image
Main Street 2–16 (Even Numbers) And 2 West Bridge Street, Bridgend				56°23′58″N 3°25′25″W	Category C(S)	39541	Upload Photo
Gatehouse				56°23′08″N 3°25′51″W	Category C(S)	39330	Upload Photo
Kinnoull Primary School, Dundee Road				56°23′45″N 3°25′16″W	Category C(S)	39343	Upload Photo
Bellwood, Off Dundee Road				56°23′30″N 3°24′59″W	Category B	39347	Upload Photo
Atholl Crescent, 1				56°23′41″N 3°25′50″W	Category B	39353	Upload Photo
Atholl Street, 1, 3, (S. Side)				56°23′58″N 3°25′56″W	Category B	39357	Upload Photo
Atholl Street 56 (N. Side)				56°23′58″N 3°26′07″W	Category C(S)	39367	Upload Photo
Atholl Street 58–66 (N. Side) (Even Numbers)				56°23′58″N 3°26′08″W	Category B	39368	Upload Photo
Barossa Place 13				56°24′04″N 3°26′02″W	Category B	39373	Upload Photo
Barossa Place 15, 17				56°24′04″N 3°26′04″W	Category C(S)	39374	Upload Photo
Barossa Street 26–56 (Even Nos)				56°24′02″N 3°26′01″W	Category C(S)	39385	Upload Photo
Blackfriars Street 8, 10				56°23′56″N 3°25′51″W	Category C(S)	39387	Upload Photo
Bowerswell Road Bankhead				56°23′52″N 3°25′15″W	Category B	39390	Upload another image
Charlotte Street, 9–13 (Odd Numbers)				56°23′56″N 3°25′43″W	Category B	39397	Upload Photo
Edinburgh Road 79, Old Tollhouse				56°22′33″N 3°25′45″W	Category C(S)	39426	Upload another image
George Street 5–9 (E Side) (Odd Numbers)				56°23′50″N 3°25′37″W	Category B	39432	Upload Photo
Middle Church, (Formerly) And Halls, 4, 6 Tay Street				56°23′51″N 3°25′36″W	Category B	39305	Upload another image
Princes Street, St John The Baptist (Scottish Episcopal) Church				56°23′38″N 3°25′40″W	Category B	39308	Upload another image
Municipal Buildings, Perth, 1, 3, 5 High Street, 8, 10, 11, 12, 13, 14, 15, 16, 18 Tay Street (One Continuous Design)				56°23′49″N 3°25′34″W	Category B	39320	Upload another image
'H' Block 1, 2, 3 North Square				56°23′10″N 3°25′54″W	Category B	39327	Upload Photo
Gleneagles Road, Friarton Quarry, St Magdalene's Gunpowder Magazine				56°22′29″N 3°26′14″W	Category B	51054	Upload Photo
Scott Street, Perth Methodist Church				56°23′42″N 3°25′58″W	Category C(S)	51368	Upload another image
284 And 286 High Street And 7 Lickley Street, Peddie's Building				56°23′49″N 3°26′17″W	Category C(S)	51398	Upload Photo
Kinnoull Street, Perth Congregational Church				56°23′52″N 3°25′59″W	Category B	51639	Upload another image
South Street, 29–37 (N. Side) (Odd Numbers)				56°23′43″N 3°25′41″W	Category B	39637	Upload another image
38 South Street And 2 Princes Street (Former Commercial Bank)				56°23′42″N 3°25′41″W	Category B	39647	Upload Photo
17–21 (Odd Nos) Speygate				56°23′41″N 3°25′37″W	Category C(S)	39651	Upload Photo
Main Street, 1–5 Bridgend (Odd Numbers)				56°23′58″N 3°25′23″W	Category C(S)	39548	Upload Photo
Strathmore Street, Ardchoille, (Formerly Rosemount) Now Perth And Kinross District Police Headquarters				56°24′04″N 3°25′17″W	Category B	39550	Upload Photo
Melville Street, 1, 3				56°23′58″N 3°26′04″W	Category C(S)	39554	Upload Photo
Melville Street 23 Scottish Milk Marketing Board Regional Office				56°24′00″N 3°26′07″W	Category B	39557	Upload Photo
Melville Street 24 Struanbank				56°24′01″N 3°26′11″W	Category C(S)	39560	Upload Photo
61–71 (Odd Nos) South Methven Street				56°23′44″N 3°26′05″W	Category B	39573	Upload Photo
Muirhall Road Pitcullen House, Part Of Murray Royal Hospital				56°24′01″N 3°25′04″W	Category B	39583	Upload another image
Murray Street, Playhouse Cinema				56°23′53″N 3°26′01″W	Category B	39584	Upload another image
Rose Terrace, 17				56°24′03″N 3°25′59″W	Category B	39599	Upload Photo
St John Street (E. Side) 18–24 (Even Numbers)				56°23′47″N 3°25′38″W	Category B	39613	Upload Photo
St John Street, (E. Side) 48, 50, Bank of Scotland Formerly Central Bank Buildings				56°23′45″N 3°25′38″W	Category A	39618	Upload another image See more images
St John Street, (E. Side) 62–70 (Even Numbers)				56°23′43″N 3°25′39″W	Category B	39620	Upload Photo
1 And 2 St Leonard's Bank, Parklands Hotel				56°23′31″N 3°26′11″W	Category C(S)	39622	Upload another image
George Street 67–71 (E Side) (Odd Numbers)				56°23′54″N 3°25′40″W	Category C(S)	39442	Upload Photo
George Street 75, 77 (E Side) Bank Of Scotland				56°23′54″N 3°25′39″W	Category B	39443	Upload Photo
George Street 26–34 (W Side) (Even Numbers)				56°23′50″N 3°25′40″W	Category B	39447	Upload Photo
George Street (W Side) 80 And 2 Charlotte Street				56°23′55″N 3°25′41″W	Category B	39453	Upload Photo
High Street 55, 57 (N Side)				56°23′49″N 3°25′42″W	Category B	39467	Upload Photo
High Street 44, 46 (S Side) And 1 St John Street				56°23′48″N 3°25′40″W	Category B	39472	Upload Photo
High Street 86–96 (S Side) (Even Numbers)				56°23′48″N 3°25′45″W	Category B	39479	Upload Photo
High Street 98–102 (S Side) (Even Numbers)				56°23′48″N 3°25′46″W	Category B	39480	Upload Photo
1–3 (Inclusive Nos) King's Place And 55 And 57 King Street And Boundary Wall				56°23′33″N 3°26′01″W	Category B	39502	Upload Photo
6 King's Place, Pedigree House				56°23′32″N 3°26′06″W	Category B	39504	Upload another image
3 King Street And 32 Canal Crescent				56°23′42″N 3°26′03″W	Category B	39505	Upload Photo
1 And 2 Graham's Place, King Street, Including Boundary Walls				56°23′39″N 3°26′02″W	Category B	39506	Upload Photo
41 And 43 King Street, Including Boundary Walls				56°23′35″N 3°26′02″W	Category C(S)	39511	Upload Photo
48 And 50 Kinnoull Street				56°23′57″N 3°25′59″W	Category C(S)	39530	Upload Photo
14–16 (Even Nos) Kinnoull Street (Former Sandeman Library)				56°23′51″N 3°25′58″W	Category C(S)	39334	Upload another image
Kincarrathie House, Former 'Chapel'				56°24′20″N 3°25′20″W	Category B	39349	Upload Photo
11–17 (Odd Nos) Atholl Street				56°23′58″N 3°26′01″W	Category B	39359	Upload Photo
Atholl Street 26–30 (N Side) (Even Numbers)				56°23′58″N 3°26′00″W	Category C(S)	39365	Upload Photo
Barossa Place, 7				56°24′05″N 3°26′00″W	Category B	39370	Upload Photo
Barossa Place 21				56°24′03″N 3°26′05″W	Category C(S)	39376	Upload Photo
Barossa Place 14, 16, 18				56°24′02″N 3°26′04″W	Category B	39383	Upload Photo
Barossa Place 22, 24				56°24′01″N 3°26′07″W	Category B	39384	Upload Photo
Charlotte Street, 10–14 (Even Numbers)				56°23′55″N 3°25′42″W	Category B	39399	Upload Photo
25 Dundee Road, Dalvay And Lower Dalvay, Formerly Manse Of St Mark's				56°23′48″N 3°25′20″W	Category C(S)	39413	Upload Photo
Dundee Road Roma				56°23′36″N 3°25′13″W	Category C(S)	39418	Upload Photo
George Street 11, 13 (E Side)				56°23′50″N 3°25′37″W	Category B	39433	Upload Photo
George Street 47–51 (E Side) Royal George Hotel (Odd Numbers)				56°23′53″N 3°25′38″W	Category B	39439	Upload another image
Kinnoull Old Churchyard Or Graveyard, Dundee Road				56°23′38″N 3°25′20″W	Category C(S)	39303	Upload Photo
Murray Royal Asylum Muirhall Road Main Building And Chapel Only				56°24′03″N 3°24′47″W	Category B	39321	Upload another image
Tay Street, Sheriff Court				56°23′40″N 3°25′34″W	Category A	39325	Upload another image
Bowerswell Lane, Bowerswell Summerhouse, Including Greenhouse And Boundary Wall				56°23′53″N 3°25′04″W	Category C(S)	47282	Upload Photo
Dundee Road, 2 Hillside, Ferndale Including Boundary Walls With Inset Railings And Gates				56°23′29″N 3°25′15″W	Category B	47317	Upload Photo
18 And 20 York Place				56°23′43″N 3°26′23″W	Category C(S)	50808	Upload Photo
Atholl Street, Former St Andrews Church				56°23′57″N 3°26′03″W	Category C(S)	51637	Upload another image
7 St Leonard's Bank, Including Boundary Walls And Outbuildings				56°23′27″N 3°26′13″W	Category B	39628	Upload Photo
St Magdalene's Road, 21 Southesk Bank				56°23′08″N 3°26′26″W	Category C(S)	39632	Upload Photo
South Street, 7 (N. Side)				56°23′43″N 3°25′37″W	Category B	39634	Upload another image
Tay Street, 2				56°23′54″N 3°25′38″W	Category C(S)	39654	Upload Photo
Main Street Springbank Bridgend (Divided Into 3 Flats)				56°24′06″N 3°25′30″W	Category B	39547	Upload Photo
Melville Street, Presbytery of St John's RC Church				56°24′00″N 3°26′10″W	Category C(S)	39559	Upload Photo
55–63 (Odd Nos) North Methven Street				56°23′56″N 3°26′04″W	Category C(S)	39568	Upload Photo
West Mill Street, The Old Granary				56°23′52″N 3°26′09″W	Category B	39579	Upload Photo
North Port, Hydro Electric Board Office, Formerly Blackfriars House				56°23′55″N 3°25′47″W	Category B	39587	Upload Photo
50 Princes Street				56°23′36″N 3°25′41″W	Category C(S)	39594	Upload Photo
Rose Terrace And 2 Atholl Street Corner House				56°23′59″N 3°25′56″W	Category B	39595	Upload another image
4 St Leonard's Bank, Including Boundary Walls				56°23′29″N 3°26′12″W	Category C(S)	39625	Upload Photo
Glasgow Road Hamilton House Now Syha				56°23′35″N 3°27′12″W	Category B	39455	Upload Photo
High Street 13–19 (N. Side) (Odd Numbers)				56°23′49″N 3°25′36″W	Category B	39462	Upload another image
High Street 28, 30 (S Side) And 1–5 Watergate (Odd Numbers)				56°23′48″N 3°25′37″W	Category B	39470	Upload Photo
High Street 76, 78 (S Side)				56°23′47″N 3°25′44″W	Category C(S)	39477	Upload Photo
44 And 46 James Street				56°23′34″N 3°26′00″W	Category C(S)	39495	Upload Photo
Keir Street Croft House				56°24′11″N 3°25′24″W	Category C(S)	39501	Upload Photo
35 King Street, Including Boundary Walls				56°23′37″N 3°26′02″W	Category C(S)	39508	Upload Photo
Kinnoull Street, 75 (E. Side)				56°23′57″N 3°25′57″W	Category C(S)	39527	Upload Photo
Kinnoull Terrace Murrayville (now Langlands)				56°23′49″N 3°25′16″W	Category C(S)	39533	Upload Photo
Kinnoull Terrace Witchhill House				56°23′47″N 3°25′17″W	Category B	39535	Upload Photo
Canal Street And Tay Street, Greyfriars Burial Ground Including Gates And Boundary Walls				56°23′36″N 3°25′38″W	Category A	39338	Upload another image See more images
Perth Bridge Over River Tay				56°23′56″N 3°25′31″W	Category A	39339	Upload another image
Tay Street, former Perth Water Works, now The Fergusson Gallery, exhibiting the works of John Duncan Fergusson				56°23′32″N 3°25′35″W	Category A	39341	Upload another image
Barossa Place 19, 19A				56°24′04″N 3°26′04″W	Category B	39375	Upload Photo
Barossa Place 23				56°24′03″N 3°26′06″W	Category B	39377	Upload Photo
Barossa Place 31 Perth And Kinross District Social Work Department				56°24′02″N 3°26′10″W	Category B	39381	Upload Photo
Blackfriars Street 4				56°23′57″N 3°25′50″W	Category C(S)	39386	Upload Photo
Charlotte Street, 4–8 (Even Numbers)				56°23′55″N 3°25′42″W	Category B	39398	Upload another image
Curfew Row, Building On Site Of Town House Of Lord John Murray				56°23′54″N 3°25′48″W	Category B	39409	Upload another image
Dundee Road Glensaugh				56°23′53″N 3°25′18″W	Category B	39411	Upload another image
Dundee Road Wellbank				56°23′39″N 3°25′16″W	Category C(S)	39416	Upload Photo
Fairmount Terrace Balnacraig				56°23′20″N 3°25′00″W	Category B	39429	Upload Photo
George Street 41–45 (E Side) (Odd Numbers)				56°23′52″N 3°25′39″W	Category C(S)	39438	Upload Photo
Mill Street, North Church (Church Of Scotland), Including Former Church Session House To Rear				56°23′51″N 3°25′59″W	Category B	39306	Upload another image
St John's RC Church Melville Street				56°24′00″N 3°26′09″W	Category C(S)	39307	Upload another image
South Methven Street, High Street And St Paul's Square, St Paul's Church				56°23′48″N 3°26′05″W	Category B	39315	Upload another image
Art Gallery, George Street				56°23′54″N 3°25′43″W	Category B	39317	Upload another image
Perth Prison Edinburgh Road 'A' Block 18, 19 South Square				56°23′10″N 3°25′54″W	Category B	39326	Upload Photo
Pomarium Street, Free Presbyterian Church Of Scotland, Including Adjoining Flat				56°23′39″N 3°26′11″W	Category C(S)	51365	Upload another image
16 and 18 Methven Street				56°23′48″N 3°26′03″W	Category B	51641	Upload Photo
South Street 55, 57 And 59 (N. Side)				56°23′43″N 3°25′44″W	Category B	39639	Upload Photo
8–12 (Even Nos) South Street And 3 Speygate				56°23′42″N 3°25′37″W	Category B	39643	Upload Photo
Main Street, 7, 9,11 Bridgend				56°23′59″N 3°25′23″W	Category C(S)	39549	Upload Photo
Melville Street, 25 Santa Monica				56°24′01″N 3°26′08″W	Category B	39558	Upload Photo
33 North Methven Street				56°23′54″N 3°26′04″W	Category C(S)	39564	Upload Photo
31 South Methven Street				56°23′48″N 3°26′05″W	Category B	39572	Upload Photo
West Mill Street, Ramada Perth Hotel, (Former Upper City Mills)				56°23′51″N 3°26′12″W	Category A	39577	Upload Photo
Muirhall Road, Annat Lodge				56°23′54″N 3°24′59″W	Category B	39581	Upload Photo
7 North William Street				56°23′57″N 3°26′01″W	Category C(S)	39588	Upload Photo
St John's Place, 3				56°23′46″N 3°25′40″W	Category B	39600	Upload Photo
St John Street, (W. Side) 17–23 (Odd Numbers)				56°23′46″N 3°25′40″W	Category B	39607	Upload Photo
St John Street, 72–76 (E. Side) (Even Numbers)				56°23′43″N 3°25′38″W	Category B	39621	Upload Photo
3 St Leonard's Bank, Including Boundary Walls And Gatepiers				56°23′30″N 3°26′12″W	Category B	39624	Upload Photo
George Street 53–57 (E Side) (Odd Numbers)				56°23′53″N 3°25′39″W	Category C(S)	39440	Upload Photo
George Street 59–65 (E Side) (Odd Numbers)				56°23′53″N 3°25′39″W	Category C(S)	39441	Upload Photo
George Street 12, 14 (W Side)				56°23′49″N 3°25′39″W	Category C(S)	39444	Upload Photo
George Street 36, 38 (W Side) Glovers Hall				56°23′51″N 3°25′40″W	Category C(S)	39448	Upload Photo
George Street 54–60 (W Side) (Even Numbers)				56°23′52″N 3°25′41″W	Category C(S)	39451	Upload Photo
High Street 48, 50 (S Side)				56°23′48″N 3°25′40″W	Category B	39473	Upload Photo
High Street 108–112 (Even Numbers) (S. Side) And 2–8 King Edward Street (Even Numbers)				56°23′47″N 3°25′47″W	Category B	39482	Upload Photo
Isla Road Tayfletts				56°24′12″N 3°25′29″W	Category B	39484	Upload Photo
Isla Road Upper Springlands Garden House And Garden Walls				56°24′34″N 3°25′43″W	Category C(S)	39491	Upload Photo
Jeanfield Road Cornhill House Now Offices				56°23′50″N 3°27′29″W	Category B	39500	Upload Photo
4 Kinnoull Street And 197 High Street				56°23′49″N 3°25′58″W	Category B	39528	Upload another image
52 Kinnoull Street And 9 Atholl Street				56°23′57″N 3°25′59″W	Category B	39531	Upload Photo
Kinnoull Terrace The Den, Offices Of John Maclaren And Russell Diplock, Architects And Planning Consultants				56°23′50″N 3°25′16″W	Category C(S)	39532	Upload Photo
Former Governor's House, 5 North Square				56°23′09″N 3°25′53″W	Category B	39328	Upload Photo
Atholl Crescent, 2–8 (All Numbers)				56°23′58″N 3°25′53″W	Category A	39354	Upload another image
1–3 Atholl Court (Formerly 6–12 Atholl Street)				56°23′58″N 3°25′57″W	Category B	39362	Upload Photo
Atholl Street 20–24 (N Side) (Even Numbers)				56°23′58″N 3°25′59″W	Category C(S)	39364	Upload Photo
Bowerswell Road Bowerswell				56°23′51″N 3°25′06″W	Category B	39388	Upload Photo
Bowerswell Road Pennylands				56°23′53″N 3°25′13″W	Category C(S)	39389	Upload Photo
Charlotte Street 3 (N Side)				56°23′56″N 3°25′40″W	Category B	39394	Upload Photo
Charlotte Street, 5				56°23′56″N 3°25′41″W	Category B	39395	Upload Photo
Charlotte Street, 7				56°23′56″N 3°25′42″W	Category B	39396	Upload Photo
Craigie Place, 19 Craigiebank				56°23′08″N 3°26′24″W	Category C(S)	39406	Upload Photo
Craigie Road Craigiepark				56°23′05″N 3°26′17″W	Category C(S)	39407	Upload Photo
Crieff Road 23 Balhousie Toll				56°24′17″N 3°27′08″W	Category C(S)	39408	Upload Photo
Fairmount Terrace Willanslee				56°23′25″N 3°25′01″W	Category C(S)	39428	Upload Photo
George Street 23–27 (E Side) (Odd Numbers)				56°23′51″N 3°25′38″W	Category B	39435	Upload another image
George Street 29–33 (E Side) (Odd Numbers)				56°23′51″N 3°25′38″W	Category B	39436	Upload another image
St Mary's Monastery, Kinnoull				56°23′41″N 3°24′35″W	Category B	39311	Upload another image
City Hall, King Edward Street, St John's Place And Kirkside				56°23′45″N 3°25′46″W	Category B	39318	Upload another image
4 York Place, The Lodge, Including Gatepiers				56°23′43″N 3°26′12″W	Category B	39324	Upload Photo
York Place, Trinity Church Of The Nazarene, Including Boundary Wall And Gatepiers				56°23′45″N 3°26′16″W	Category C(S)	51362	Upload Photo
South Street, 11–15 (N. Side) (Odd Numbers)				56°23′43″N 3°25′38″W	Category B	39635	Upload Photo
189 South Street And 70 South Methven Street				56°23′44″N 3°26′03″W	Category B	39642	Upload Photo
22 South William Street				56°23′34″N 3°25′47″W	Category C(S)	39649	Upload another image See more images
Muirhall Road Annat Lodge Stableyard				56°23′56″N 3°25′01″W	Category C(S)	39582	Upload Photo
43 Princes Street, Dunbar				56°23′39″N 3°25′45″W	Category C(S)	39590	Upload Photo
St John's Place, 5, 6, 7 & 8				56°23′46″N 3°25′42″W	Category C(S)	39602	Upload Photo
St John Street, 25 1, 3 5 South St John's Place				56°23′44″N 3°25′40″W	Category B	39608	Upload Photo
St John Street, (E. Side) 32–36 (Even Numbers)				56°23′46″N 3°25′38″W	Category B	39615	Upload Photo
St John Street, (E. Side) 38, 40				56°23′46″N 3°25′38″W	Category B	39616	Upload another image
George Street 40–48 (W Side) (Even Numbers)				56°23′51″N 3°25′40″W	Category C(S)	39449	Upload Photo
High Street 7, 9, 11 (N. Side) Royal Bank Of Scotland				56°23′49″N 3°25′36″W	Category B	39461	Upload Photo
High Street 32, 34, 36 And 36A (S Side)				56°23′48″N 3°25′38″W	Category B	39471	Upload Photo
High Street 60, 62 (S Side)				56°23′48″N 3°25′42″W	Category B	39474	Upload Photo
High Street 104, 106 (S. Side) Guildhall				56°23′48″N 3°25′47″W	Category B	39481	Upload another image
Isla Road Springland				56°24′31″N 3°25′44″W	Category B	39488	Upload another image See more images
4 And 5 King's Place				56°23′33″N 3°26′05″W	Category B	39503	Upload Photo
16 King Street, Including Boundary Walls				56°23′38″N 3°26′05″W	Category C(S)	39518	Upload Photo
Kinnoull Terrace Somerset				56°23′47″N 3°25′13″W	Category C(S)	39537	Upload another image
Leonard Street, Station Hotel, Including Gatepiers				56°23′34″N 3°26′21″W	Category B	39538	Upload another image
Perth Northern District Primary School, Dunkeld Road And Muirton Place				56°24′02″N 3°26′16″W	Category B	39344	Upload Photo
Kincarrathie House, Old People's Home. (Gannochy Trust) Isla Road And Pitcullen Crescent				56°24′23″N 3°25′23″W	Category B	39348	Upload Photo
Atholl Street 32–36 (N. Side) (Even Numbers)				56°23′59″N 3°26′01″W	Category C(S)	39366	Upload another image
Charlotte Place 2–4, And 20 Charlotte Street				56°23′55″N 3°25′44″W	Category A	39392	Upload another image
1 Charterhouse Lane And 2 And 4 Canal Crescent				56°23′40″N 3°26′00″W	Category C(S)	39401	Upload another image
Craigie Place, 17, Earlybank				56°23′09″N 3°26′24″W	Category B	39405	Upload Photo
Curfew Row Fair Maid's House				56°23′54″N 3°25′48″W	Category B	39410	Upload another image
Dundee Road Kinnoull Cottage				56°23′46″N 3°25′20″W	Category B	39412	Upload Photo
Dundee Road Knowehead				56°23′49″N 3°25′20″W	Category B	39414	Upload Photo
Dundee Road Rio (Abbeyfield Society Old People's Home)				56°23′43″N 3°25′17″W	Category B	39415	Upload Photo
Dundee Road St Leonard's Manse				56°23′19″N 3°25′07″W	Category B	39420	Upload Photo
George Street 35–39 (E Side) (Odd Numbers)				56°23′52″N 3°25′39″W	Category C(S)	39437	Upload Photo
Kinnoull Aisle, Kinnoull Old Churchyard Or Graveyard, Dundee Road				56°23′38″N 3°25′20″W	Category A	39302	Upload another image
Marshall Place, St Leonard's-In-The-Fields Church And Halls (Church Of Scotland), Including Boundary Wall And Gatepiers				56°23′33″N 3°25′59″W	Category A	39310	Upload another image
St Matthew's Hall And Church Officer's House, 34 Watergate				56°23′47″N 3°25′35″W	Category C(S)	39313	Upload Photo
Atholl Street And North Methven Street, St Ninian's Cathedral (Scottish Episcopal Church)				56°23′57″N 3°26′09″W	Category A	39314	Upload another image
170–178 (Even Nos) South Street, Former Wesleyan Chapel				56°23′42″N 3°25′58″W	Category C(S)	39316	Upload Photo
York Place, A. K. Bell Library Including Boundary Wall To York Place				56°23′42″N 3°26′15″W	Category A	39323	Upload another image
Caledonian Road, Caledonian Road Primary School Including Advanced Department Building, Wrought Iron Railings And Gates				56°23′40″N 3°26′19″W	Category B	50510	Upload another image
97 Canal Street, Mucky Mulligan's				56°23′40″N 3°25′59″W	Category C(S)	51363	Upload Photo
9 St Leonard's Bank, Including Boundary Walls				56°23′25″N 3°26′14″W	Category C(S)	39630	Upload Photo
South Street, 17–21 (N. Side) (Odd Numbers)				56°23′43″N 3°25′38″W	Category B	39636	Upload Photo
Tay Street, 46–52 "Gowrie House" (Even Numbers)				56°23′43″N 3°25′33″W	Category B	39657	Upload another image
1 West Bridge Street Bridgend				56°23′57″N 3°25′24″W	Category C(S)	39663	Upload another image
113–119 (Odd Nos) Glover Street				56°23′35″N 3°26′36″W	Category B	39667	Upload Photo
Main Street Inchbank Bridgend				56°24′01″N 3°25′25″W	Category B	39542	Upload another image
Main Street Earnoch Bridgend				56°24′05″N 3°25′29″W	Category B	39546	Upload Photo
Melville Street, 15, 17				56°23′59″N 3°26′06″W	Category C(S)	39556	Upload Photo
Melville Street 28–32 (Even Numbers) And 1 Low Street				56°24′01″N 3°26′11″W	Category C(S)	39563	Upload Photo
Methven Street, (North) 43–47 (Odd Numbers)				56°23′55″N 3°26′04″W	Category C(S)	39566	Upload Photo
North Port, 8 – 16 (Even Numbers)				56°23′54″N 3°25′45″W	Category B	39586	Upload another image
38–48 (Even Nos) Princes Street				56°23′36″N 3°25′41″W	Category C(S)	39593	Upload Photo
Glasgow Road Rosslyn House				56°23′43″N 3°26′46″W	Category C(S)	39454	Upload Photo
Glasgow Road, 107 Hamilton House Lodge				56°23′36″N 3°27′04″W	Category C(S)	39456	Upload Photo
High Street 64–68 (S Side) (Even Numbers)				56°23′47″N 3°25′42″W	Category B	39475	Upload Photo
Isla Road Rose Cottage				56°24′10″N 3°25′24″W	Category C(S)	39483	Upload Photo
Kinnoull Street 25, 27 (E Side)				56°23′50″N 3°25′56″W	Category C(S)	39524	Upload Photo
Kinnoull Terrace Gaskhill				56°23′48″N 3°25′16″W	Category C(S)	39534	Upload another image
Original Perimeter Wall Enclosing Canal S And Se Of C And D Blocks				56°23′04″N 3°25′42″W	Category B	39332	Upload Photo
6 And 8 South Methven Street (Former Sharp's Institute)				56°23′49″N 3°26′01″W	Category B	39335	Upload Photo
Atholl Street, 5, 7, (S. Side) And 77 Kinnoull Street				56°23′57″N 3°25′57″W	Category B	39358	Upload Photo
19 Atholl Street And 18 North William Street				56°23′58″N 3°26′02″W	Category C(S)	39360	Upload Photo
Barossa Place, 9				56°24′04″N 3°26′01″W	Category B	39371	Upload Photo
Barossa Place 29				56°24′02″N 3°26′09″W	Category C(S)	39380	Upload Photo
Charlotte Street 1 (N Side)				56°23′56″N 3°25′40″W	Category B	39393	Upload Photo
Commercial Street 1, 3 Bridgend				56°23′57″N 3°25′24″W	Category C(S)	39402	Upload Photo
2 And 4 County Place And 1 Hospital Street				56°23′43″N 3°26′06″W	Category B	39403	Upload Photo
6 And 8 County Place And 3 And 5 Hospital Street				56°23′43″N 3°26′06″W	Category B	39404	Upload Photo
St John's Kirk, Kirkside, St John's Place, St John Street				56°23′45″N 3°25′41″W	Category A	39300	Upload another image See more images
251 High Street (Grant Miller Memorial Hall)				56°23′49″N 3°26′06″W	Category B	39301	Upload another image
52–54 Canal Street, Love's Auction Rooms				56°23′38″N 3°25′48″W	Category B	50620	Upload Photo
15–19 (Odd Nos) Princes Street				56°23′41″N 3°25′42″W	Category C(S)	51366	Upload Photo
46–50 (Even Nos) South Street				56°23′42″N 3°25′43″W	Category C(S)	51369	Upload Photo
226–232 (Even Nos) High Street				56°23′48″N 3°26′03″W	Category C(S)	51638	Upload Photo

== Key ==
The scheme for classifying buildings in Scotland is:

- Category A: "buildings of national or international importance, either architectural or historic; or fine, little-altered examples of some particular period, style or building type."
- Category B: "buildings of regional or more than local importance; or major examples of some particular period, style or building type, which may have been altered."
- Category C: "buildings of local importance; lesser examples of any period, style, or building type, as originally constructed or moderately altered; and simple traditional buildings which group well with other listed buildings."

In March 2016 there were 47,288 listed buildings in Scotland. Of these, 8% were Category A, and 50% were Category B, with the remaining 42% being Category C.
