= Congregational Church of Perth =

Congregational Church
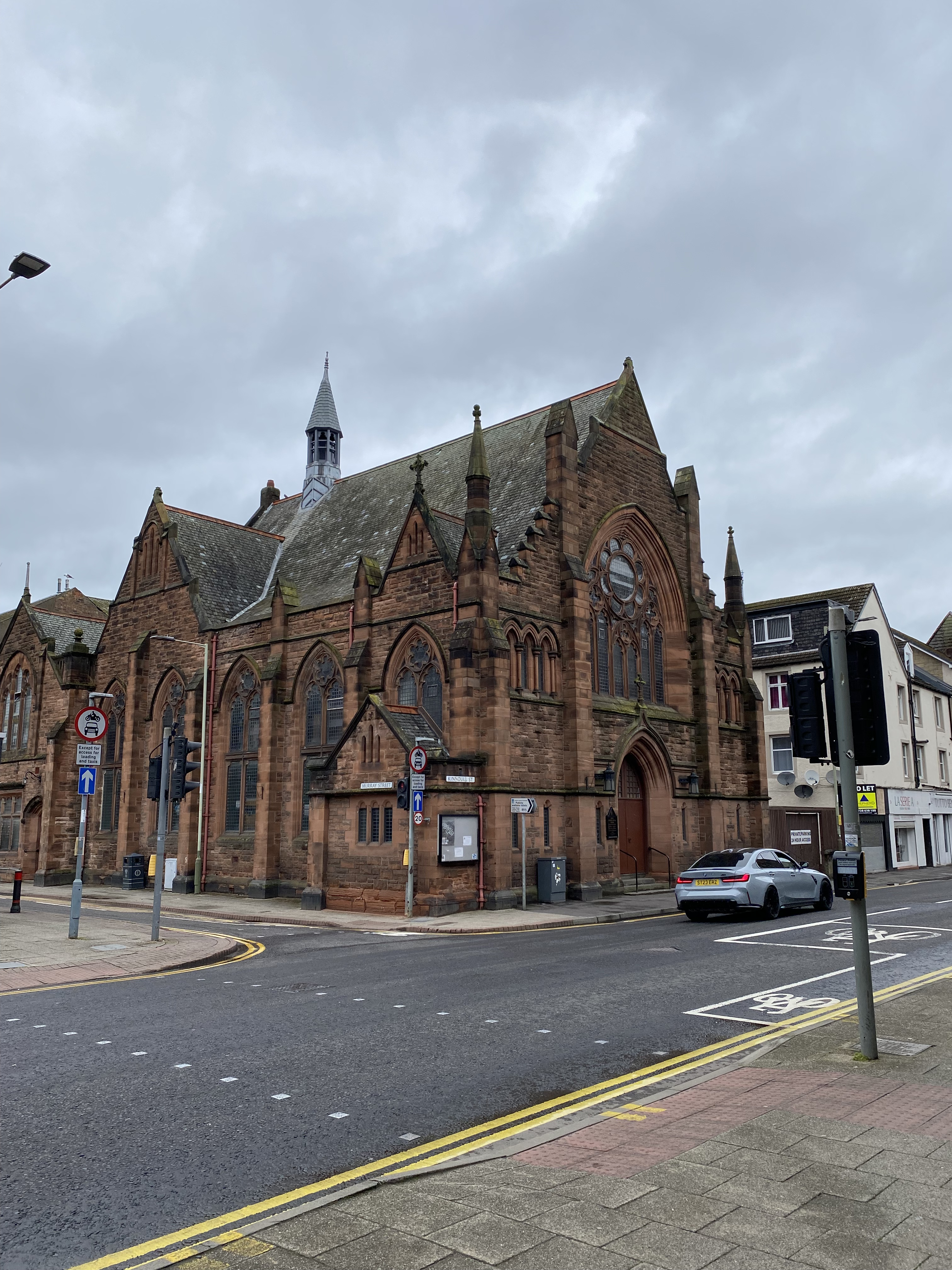
- The church in 2023, viewed from Kinnoull Street
- Congregational Church
- 56°23′52″N 3°25′58″W
- Location: Kinnoull Street, Perth, Perth and Kinross
- Country: Scotland
- Denomination: Congregational

History
- Status: open

Architecture
- Functional status: used
- Heritage designation: Category B listed building
- Designated: 19 November 2010
- Architect: Steele and Balfour
- Completed: 1899 (127 years ago)

Perth Congregational Church is located in Perth, Perth and Kinross, Scotland. Standing on Kinnoull Street, at its junction with Murray Street, it was completed in 1899. It is now a Category B listed building. The church's architects were Glasgow's Steele and Balfour.

== See also ==
- List of listed buildings in Perth, Scotland
