= Alexander Petrie =

Alexander Petrie may refer to:

- Alexander Petrie (architect)
- Alexander Petrie (classicist)
- Alexander Petrie (minister)
- Alexander Petrie (rugby union)
