= Scott Street Methodist Church =

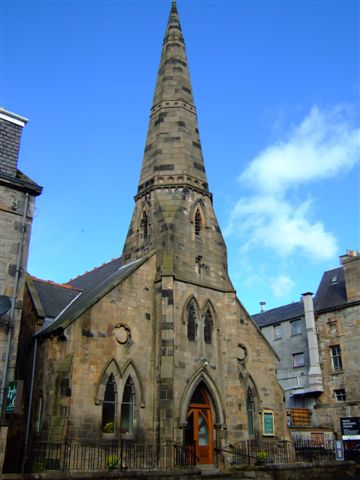
- The church in 2007
- Scott Street Methodist Church
- 56°23′42″N 3°25′57″W
- Location: Scott Street, Perth, Perth and Kinross
- Country: Scotland
- Denomination: Methodism

History
- Status: open

Architecture
- Functional status: used
- Heritage designation: Category C listed building
- Designated: 22 September 2009
- Architect: Alexander Petrie
- Completed: 1880 (146 years ago)

Scott Street Methodist Church is located in Perth, Perth and Kinross, Scotland. Standing in the city centre, it was completed in 1880, and is now a Category C listed building. The church was designed by architect Alexander Petrie.

A "good, well-detailed example of a late 19th century ecclesiastical building," it is notable for its prominent broached spire, which climbs out of its street-facing elevation.

== See also ==
- List of listed buildings in Perth, Scotland
