= 1 West Bridge Street =

Tollhouse in Perth, Perth and Kinross, Scotland

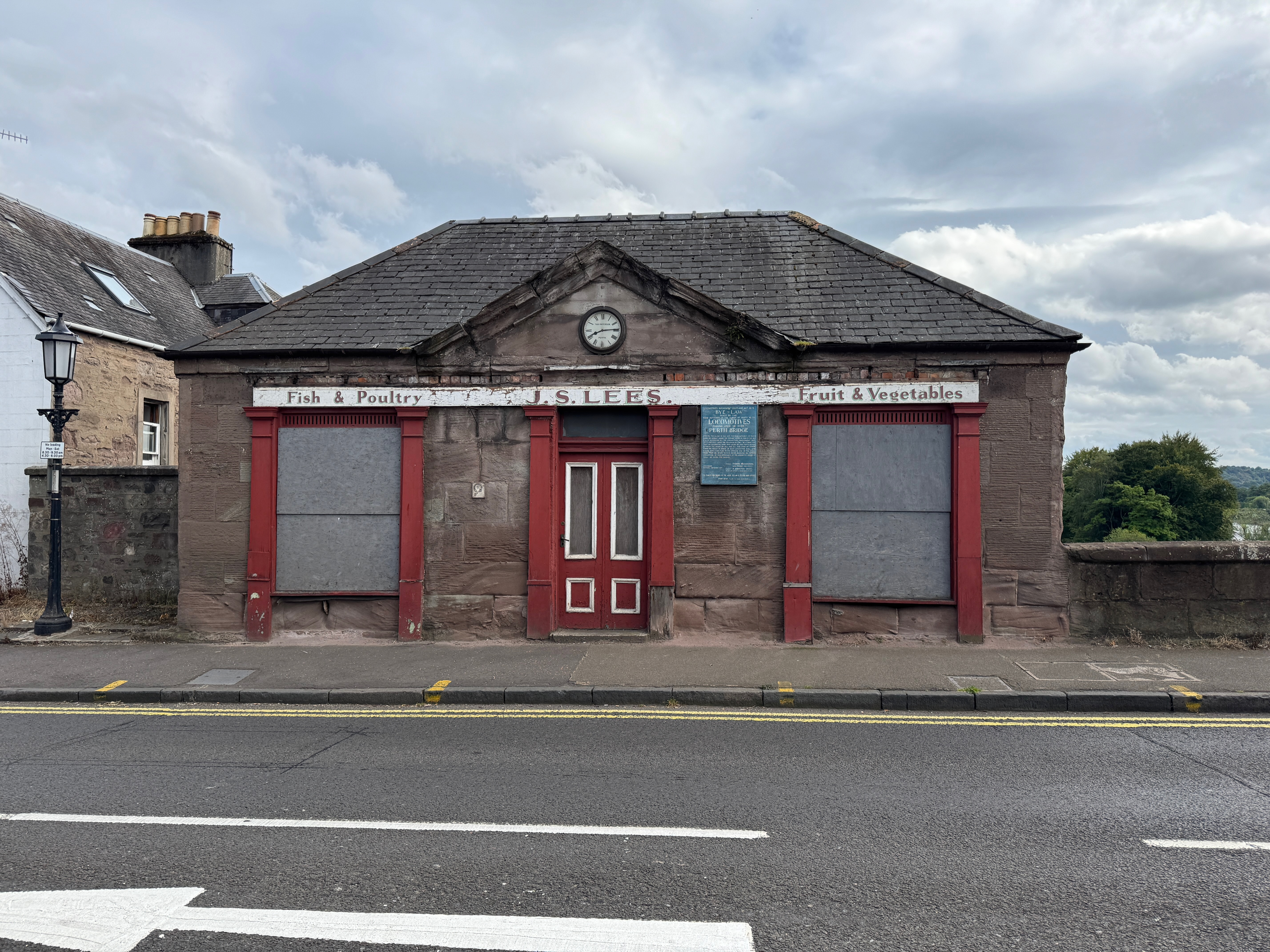
- The building in 2024

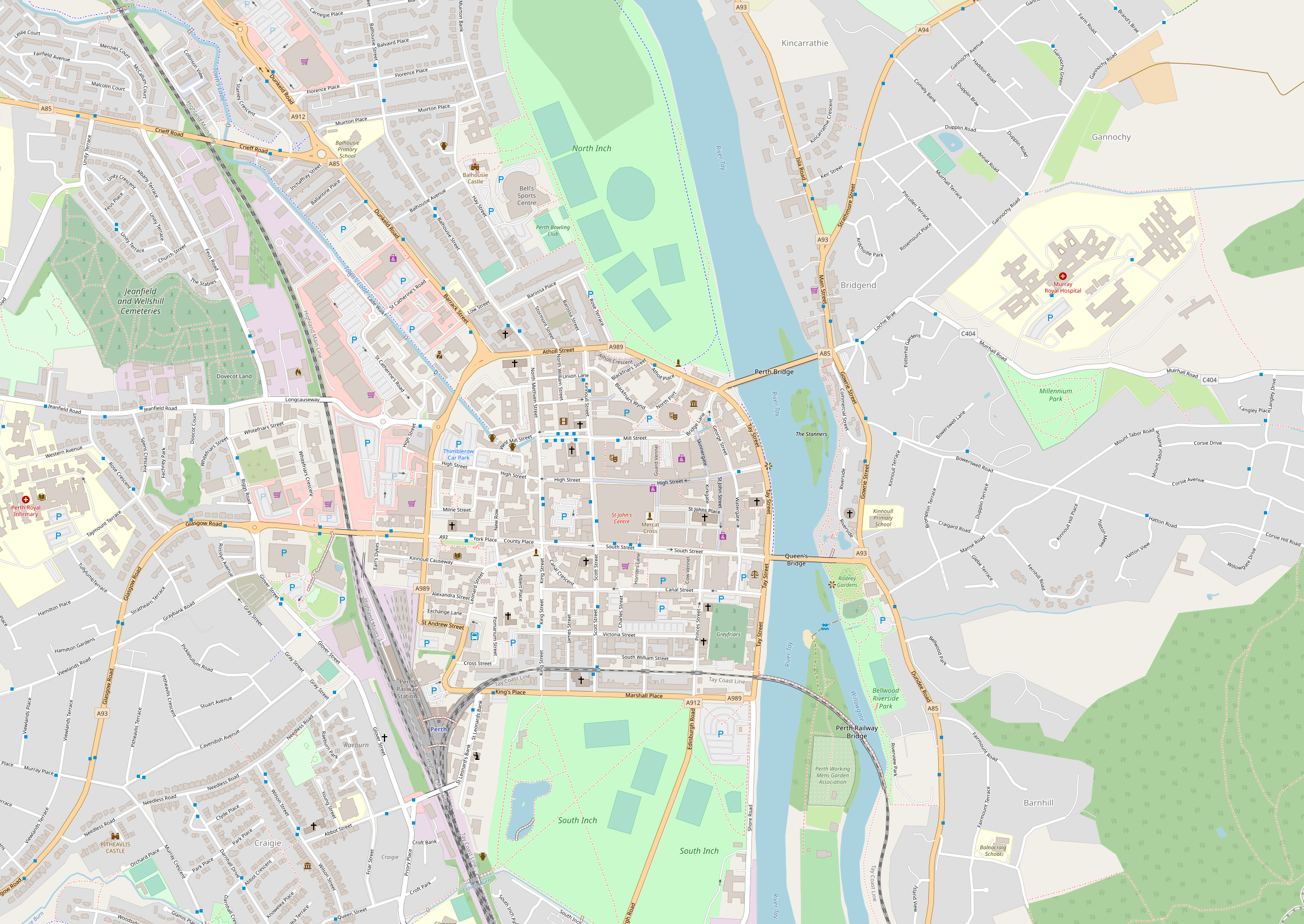
- Shown in Perth
- 56.39928°N 3.423459°W
- Location: 1 West Bridge Street, Bridgend, Perth, Scotland

History
- Built: c. 1800 (226 years ago)

Listed Building – Category C(S)
- Designated: 26 August 1977
- Reference no.: LB39663

1 West Bridge Street is an historic building in the Bridgend area of Perth, Scotland. A former tollbooth building, it is a Category C listed building dating to around 1800 and is located on the southern side of the eastern end of Perth Bridge. The part of the building that curved around onto Commercial Street has been demolished.

== History ==
It was one of three toll houses in Perth, the others being on the Edinburgh and Dundee Roads (the latter being the Barnhill Tollhouse). A bye-law on the building's noticeboard specified that locomotives crossing the bridge had to be preceded by a flagbearer. The law was enacted after a locomotive with spiked wheels damaged the road surface.

After its original use, it was J. I. Laing's fruiter, fishmonger and poulterer (as of 1911) and J. S. Lees Fish & Poultry Shop later in its life.

== See also ==
- List of listed buildings in Perth, Scotland
