= 32–36 Atholl Street =

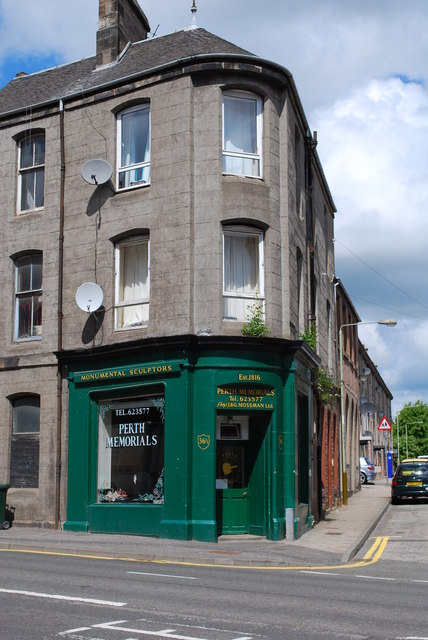
- 36 Atholl Street, at the corner of Stormont Street, in 2010

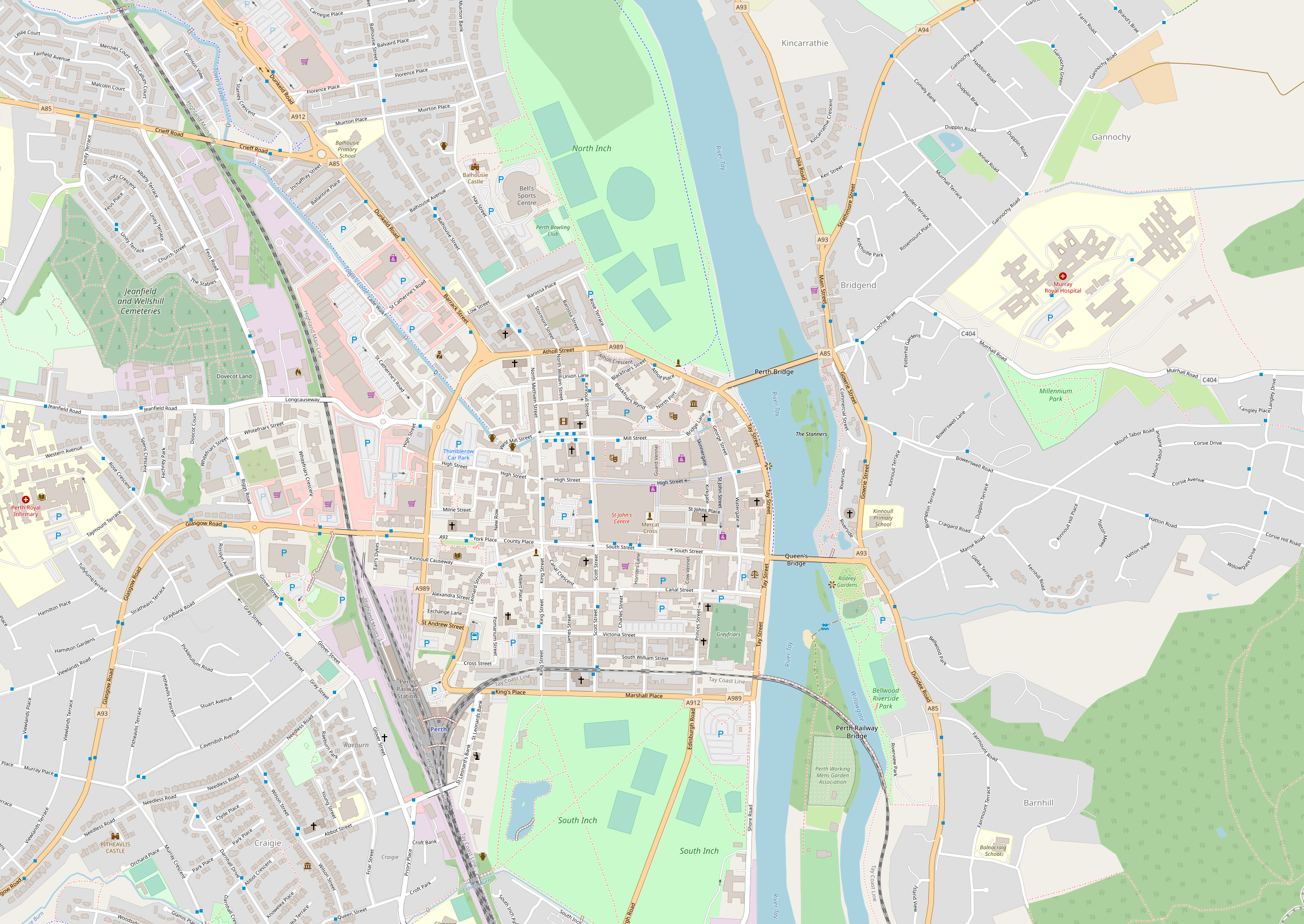
- Shown in Perth 32–36 Atholl Street (Scotland)
- 56.399502°N 3.433982°W
- Location: 32–36 Atholl Street, Perth

History
- Built: early 19th century

Listed Building – Category C(S)
- Official name: Atholl Street 32–36 (N. Side) (Even Numbers)
- Designated: 26 August 1977
- Reference no.: LB39366

32–36 Atholl Street is a three-property row of historic buildings on the northern side of Atholl Street in Perth, Scotland. Dating to the early 19th century, the building is Category C listed. The building appears on 1823 maps.

Perth Memorials, a subsidiary of Glasgow-based J. & G. Mossman Ltd., occupies number 36, at the corner of Stormont Street. The parent company was established in 1816, but it is not known when it moved into the building.

== See also ==
- List of listed buildings in Perth, Scotland
