= Holmlea Primary School =

Coordinates: 55.819°N 4.26202°W

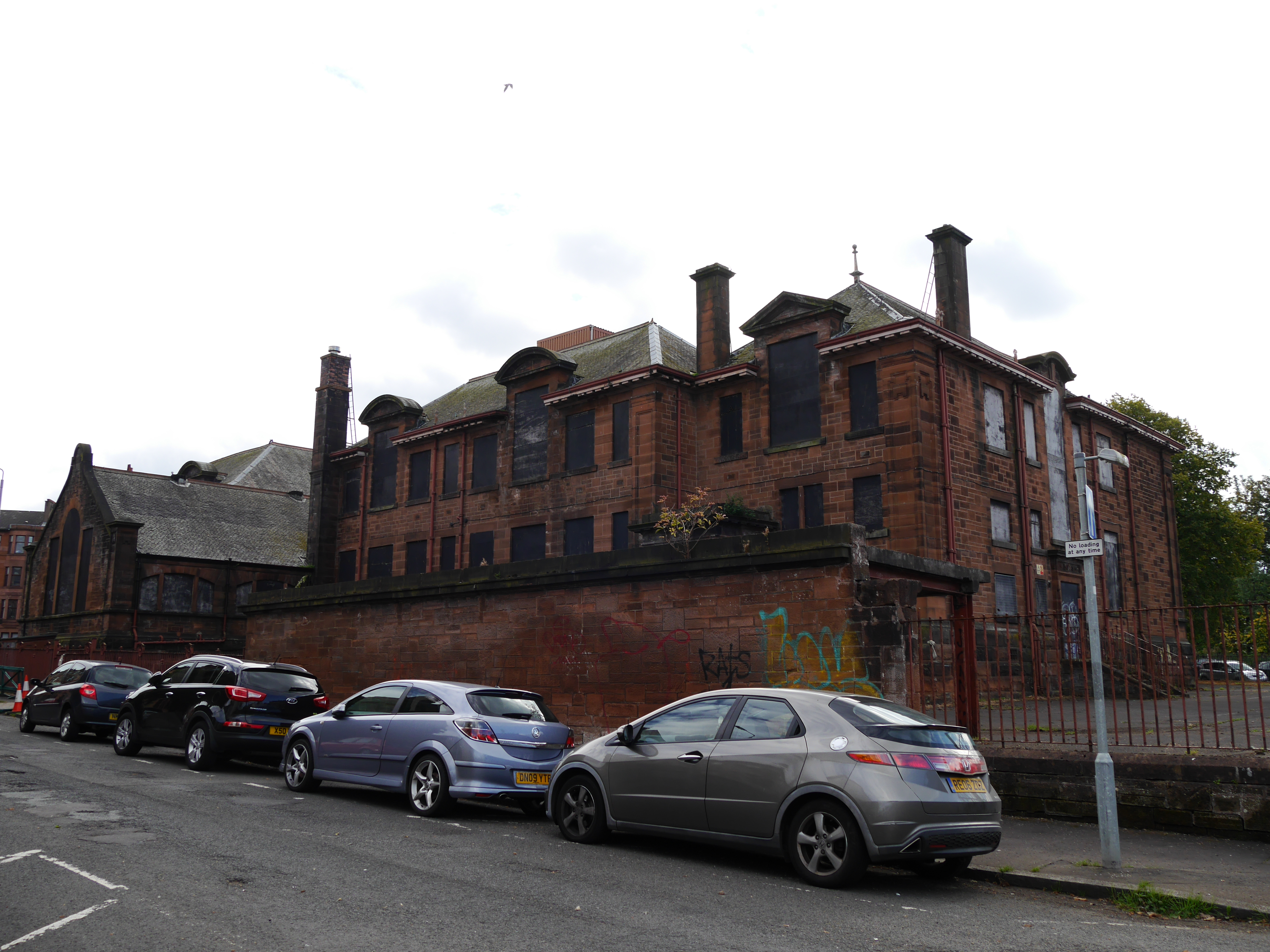
- Holmlea Primary School, 2014

Location
- 352-362 Holmlea Road; Cathcart; Glasgow, G44 4BY; Scotland

Information
- Established: 1908
- Closed: 2005

Listed Building – Category B
- Designated: 16 March 1993
- Reference no.: LB33807

Holmlea Primary School is a Category B listed former school in Glasgow. It was built in 1908 and closed in 2005. The building lay empty for several years after the school's closure but has now been renovated and converted into affordable housing.

== History ==
It was built in 1908 from red Dumfriesshire ashlar in a 17th-century domestic style, and the architect was Andrew Balfour.

In June 2005, facing an estimated repair bill of £5m, the school closed and the pupils transferred to Merrylee Primary School.

Glasgow City Council placed the building up for sale in 2006 after declaring it surplus. Glasgow Community Education Association (GCEA) made a bid to buy it with plans to open a private Islamic school. They later abandoned the bid and the property was put back on the market.

In June 2014, the Buildings at Risk Register noted, "External inspection finds the building unmaintained and with vegetative and damp penetration set in further. Condition moved to Poor and Risk to Moderate. The site does not appear to currently be under marketing for sale."

The building was left unused until 2018 when it was purchased by Home Group, who worked closely with Glasgow City Council and Cathcart & District Housing Association to carry out a sympathetic restoration. The building was converted into 49 affordable homes, which were occupied by residents in 2020.

The mechanical engineer and industrialist Thomas Leith was educated there.
