= Alexander Cattanach Jr. =

Scottish architect (1895–1977)

Alexander Cattanach
- Born: 9 June 1895; Kingussie, Scotland
- Died: 19 January 1977 (aged 81); Nottingham, England
- Occupation: Architect

Alexander Cattanach (9 June 1895 – 19 January 1977) was a Scottish architect, prominent in the first half of the 20th century. His designs were mostly for cinemas.

He was the son of fellow architect Alexander Cattanach Sr.

== Early life ==
Mackenzie was born on 9 June 1895, one of Alexander Senior's five sons.

He was educated at Kingussie School and Glasgow School of Art, though his time at the latter was interrupted by World War I. He served with the Queen's Own Cameron Highlanders during the conflict. He also served with them during World War II, being promoted to Colonel in the process.

== Career ==
Cattanach took over his father's practice around 1928, when Cattanach Senior fell ill.

=== Selected notable works ===
- Perth Playhouse, Perth (1933)
- Kirkwall Power Station, Kirkwall (after 1945)

== Personal life ==
Cattanach was married to Grace Ann McDougall Hood. She died on 12 December 1976, and Cattanach followed her a few weeks into the new year, aged 81.
