= 16–18 South Methven Street =

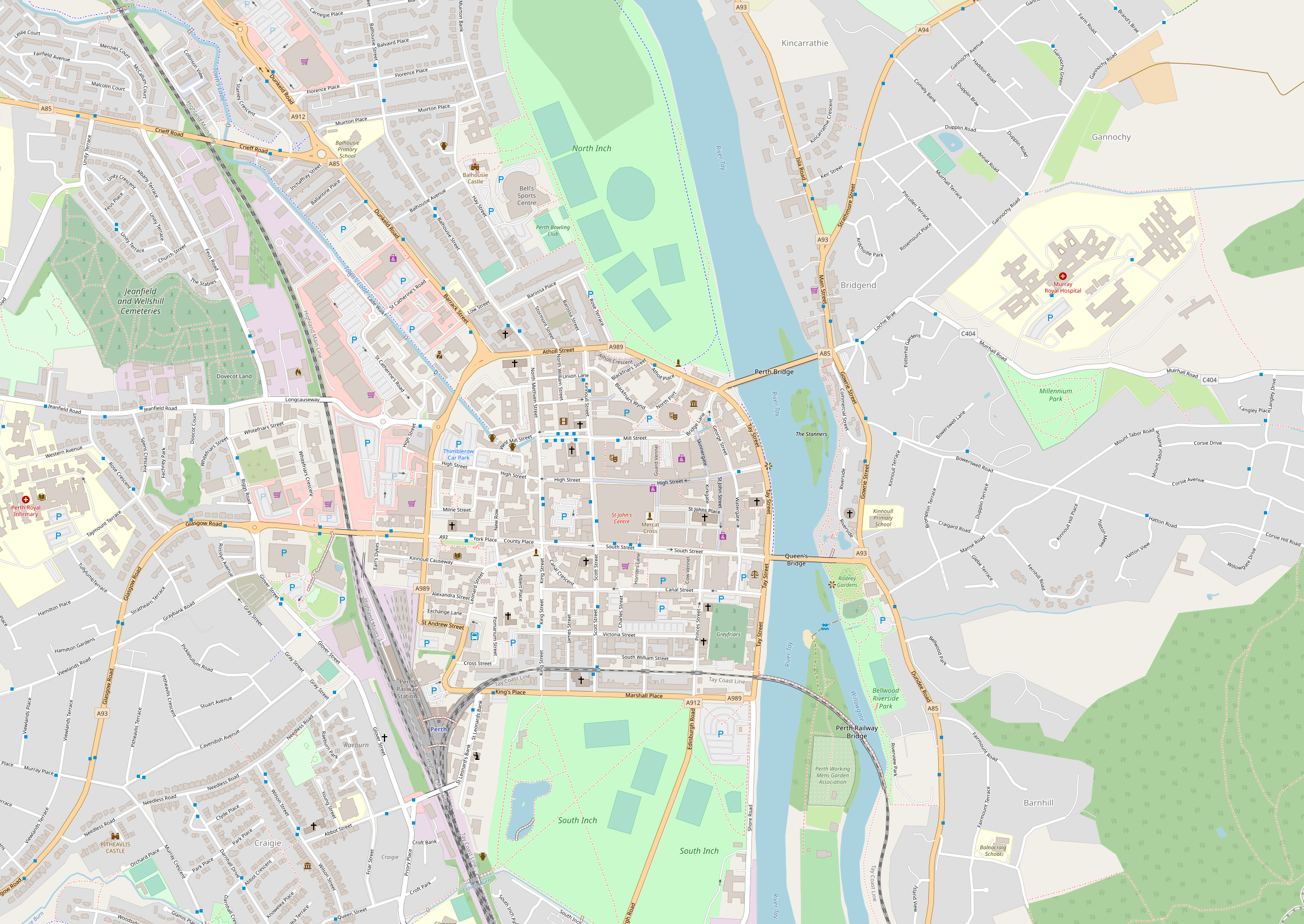
- Shown in Perth 16–18 South Methven Street (Scotland)
- 56.3967°N 3.4343°W
- Location: 16–18 South Methven Street, Perth

History
- Built: 1894 (132 years ago)

Site notes
- Architect: Peter Roy Jackson
- Governing body: Historic Environment Scotland

Listed Building – Category B
- Official name: 16 and 18 Methven Street
- Designated: 19 November 2010
- Reference no.: LB51641

16–18 South Methven Street is an historic building in Perth, Scotland. Dating to 1894, the building is Category B listed.

Designed by Peter Roy Jackson, who was articled to Perth architect Andrew Heiton, it is a three-storey property with attic, including a four-bay corner tenement. It has an octagonal corner dormer surmounted by an ogee-roofed copper drum. Historic Environment Scotland describes the structure as "a prominent and well-detailed red sandstone building".

The commercial space on the ground floor is currently vacant after the closure of the PizzaExpress outlet in December 2023.

== See also ==
- List of listed buildings in Perth, Scotland
