= Cunningham–Graham Close =

- The close in the mid-19th century

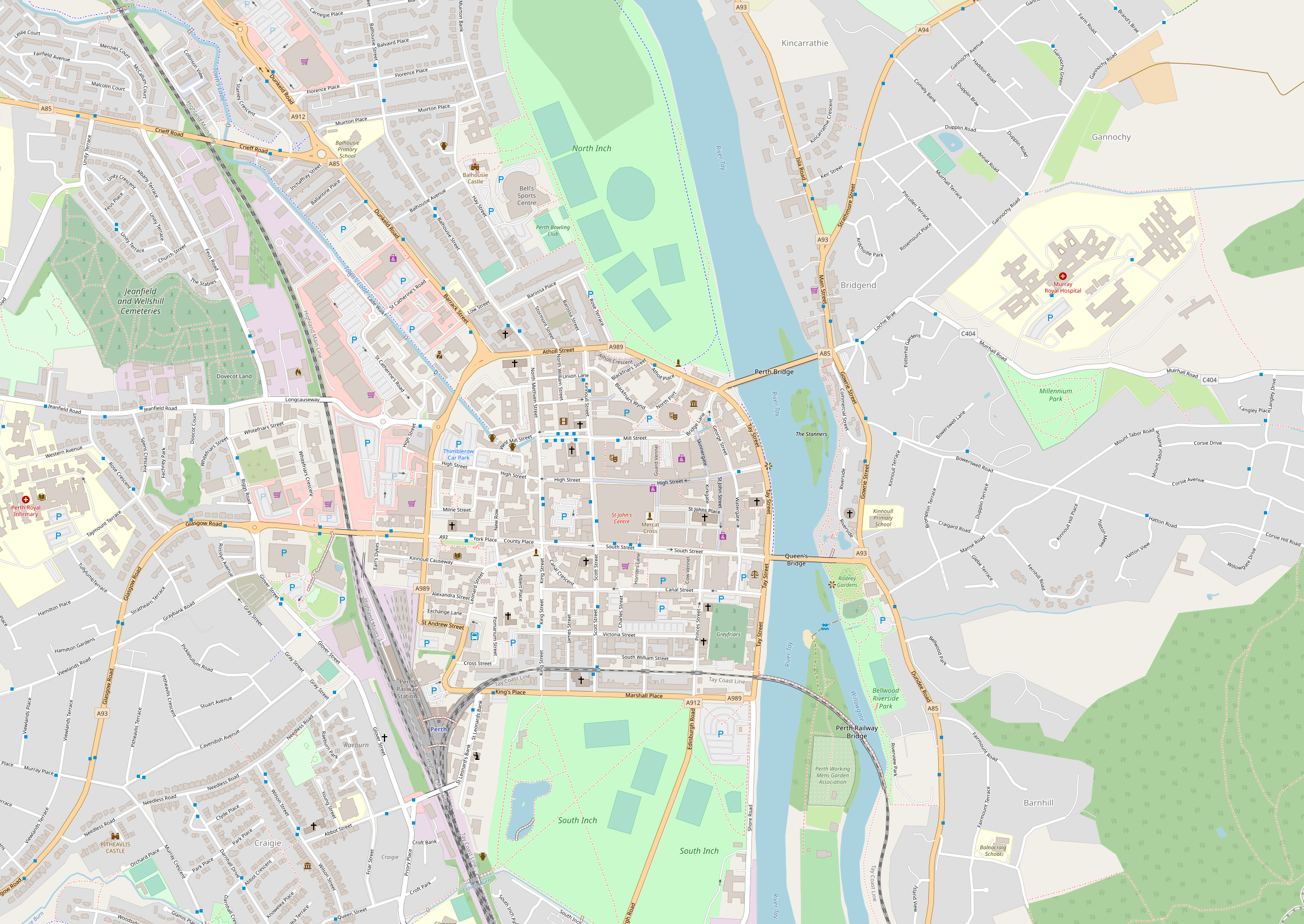
- Shown in Perth
- 56.3969195°N 3.4267028°W
- Location: 13–17 High Street; Perth; Perth and Kinross; Scotland

History
- Built: 1699 (327 years ago)

Listed Building – Category B
- Designated: 20 May 1965
- Reference no.: LB39462

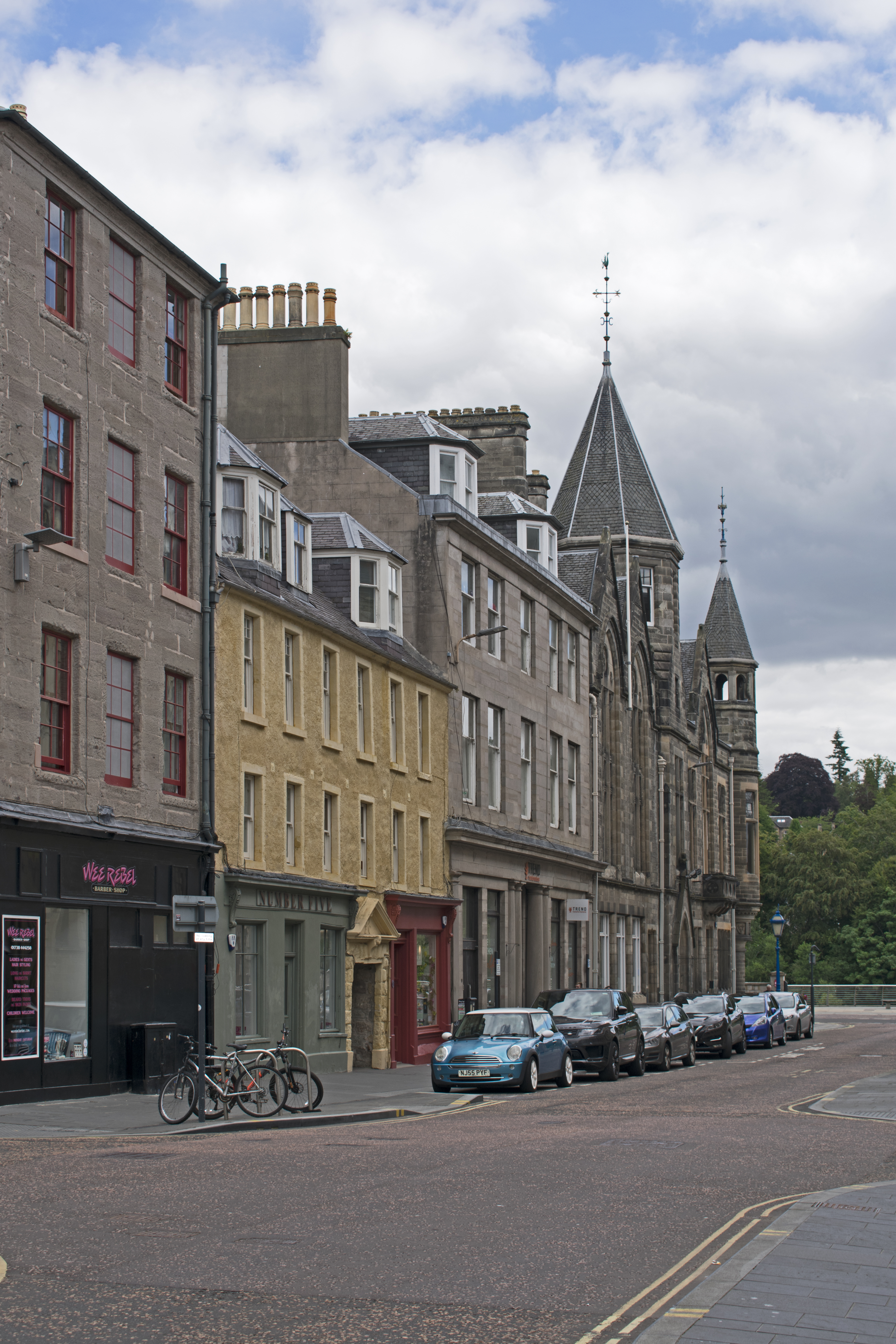
Photograph of the building

Cunningham–Graham Close is a historic building in Perth, Scotland. Located at 13–17 High Street, it is a Category B listed building, built in 1699. It is the oldest continually inhabited building in the city, and one of the few remaining that pre-date the Georgian new town remodelling of the city centre.

A monogram with the carving "RG, EC" and its year of construction is located above the entrance to the close. These initials refer to Robert Graham and Elspeth Cunningham, for whom the building is named.

The building is three storeys and an attic.

In 2016, a project that renovated the property won the biennial Perth Civic Trust Award.

== See also ==
- List of listed buildings in Perth, Scotland
