= Alexander Cattanach Sr. =

Scottish architect (1856–1928)

Alexander Cattanach
- Born: 26 October 1856; Scotland
- Died: 3 September 1928 (aged 71); Kingussie
- Occupation: Architect

Alexander Cattanach (26 October 1856 – 3 September 1928) was a Scottish architect, prominent in the late 19th century and early 20th century. His designs ranged from cinema buildings to villas to schools.

== Early life ==
Mackenzie was born on 26 October 1856, the son of Donald and Jane.

== Career ==
Following in his father's footsteps, Cattanach trained as a stonemason but turned to architecture, practising in Kingussie.

=== Selected notable works ===
- Duke of Gordon Hotel, Kingussie (1906)
- Craigmhor Hotel, Newtonmore (extensive additions, 1909)

== Personal life ==
Cattanach had five sons, of whom two (Donald and Alexander Jr.) were architects, one (Andrew) a road surveyor, one (William) was an engineer and one (Evan) a farmer.

Cattanach dies on 3 September 1928, aged 71.
