= Thomas Leith =

Thomas Leith

Thomas Orr Leith OBE, FRAE (23 March 1926 – 7 November 2005) was a Scottish mechanical engineer and industrialist.

== Biography ==
Thomas Orr Leith was born on 23 March 1926 in Cathcart, Glasgow, Scotland, youngest son in a family with seven brothers and sisters.

He attended Holmlea Primary School in Cathcart (now closed) before being evacuated to Troon in 1939 at the start of the World War II. In 1942 he returned to Glasgow to join Weir Pumps Ltd in Cathcart, Glasgow (then called G. and J. Weir Ltd) as an Apprentice Marine Engineer. While an apprentice he also studied for the Higher National Certificate exams at Langside College in Mount Florida and, following this, left Weirs to study full-time at the Royal Technical College, Glasgow (now the University of Strathclyde). He graduated with a BSc in Mechanical Engineering in 1950, and was winner of the Montgomerie Neilson Gold Medal and Prize (awarded to the first ranked graduating student in Mechanical Engineering).

He rejoined Weir Pumps and in 1954 he became Head of Steam Turbine and Gearing Design, in 1962 was made Chief Designer and in 1966 Director and General Manager of the Pump and Turbine Division (later renamed the Energy Division). In 1980 he became Director, Contracts Division at Weir Pumps before moving in 1988 to take up the Managing Director role at Weir Westgarth Ltd until his retirement in 1991. He was Chairman of Clairmont Plc from 1992 to 1994.

He was an inventor or co-inventor of a number of improvements to centrifugal pumps and level control, during the period 1956 to 1962 at G. and J. Weir Ltd.

He was a Fellow of the Royal Academy of Engineering, President of the Institution of Engineers and Shipbuilders in Scotland from 1987 to 1989, Fellow of the Institution of Mechanical Engineers and Fellow of the Institution of Marine Engineers. He was conferred Honorary Fellowship of the Institution of Engineers and Shipbuilders in Scotland in 2004.

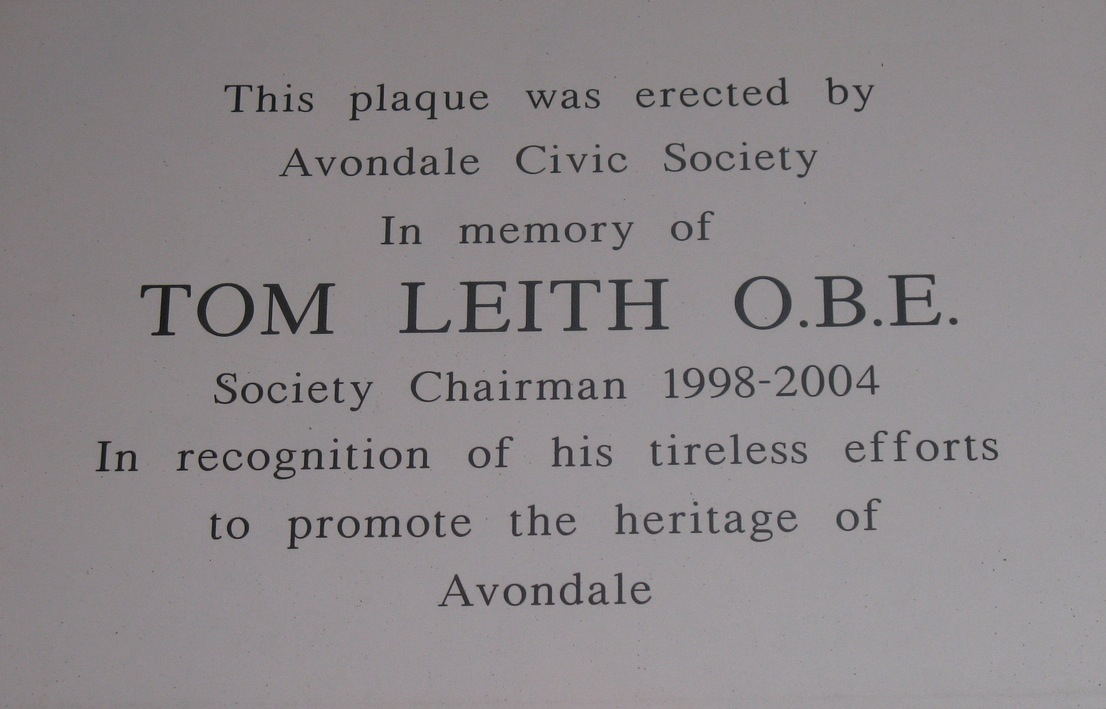
Plaque in Strathaven, Lanarkshire

Thomas Leith was made an Officer of the Order of the British Empire OBE in the 1988 New Year's Honours for Services to Export.

Thomas Leith was active in the local community. He was Chairman of the Community Council in Newton Mearns and, following a move to Strathaven in Lanarkshire on his retirement in 1991, was actively involved in the Avondale Civic Society of which he was chairman from 1998 to 2004. A plaque near Strathaven Castle was raised by Avondale Civic Society to commemorate his contribution.

== Selected papers ==
1. T.O. Leith; H.E.C. Clapham; J.R. McColl (September 1969). "Paper 2: Glandless Pump–Motor Units for Feed Heating Plant in Central Power Stations". Proceedings of the Institution of Mechanical Engineers, Conference Proceedings. 184 (11): 19–29. doi:10.1243/PIME_CONF_1969_184_345_02.
2. T.O. Leith; J.R. McColl; M.L. Ryall (September 1969). "Paper 4: Advanced-Class Boiler Feed Pumps for 660-Mw Generators". Proceedings of the Institution of Mechanical Engineers, Conference Proceedings. 184 (14): 36–47. doi:10.1243/PIME_CONF_1969_184_422_02.
3. A. Linstrum; P.G. Nicoll; G.C. Mulholland; T.O. Leith (November 1995). "Large Seawater Reverse Osmosis Installations in Gulf Waters and a Process Comparison with Multi Stage Flash Distillation". Proceedings of the IDA World Congress on Desalination & Water Sciences. V: 27–41.
