= 22 South William Street =

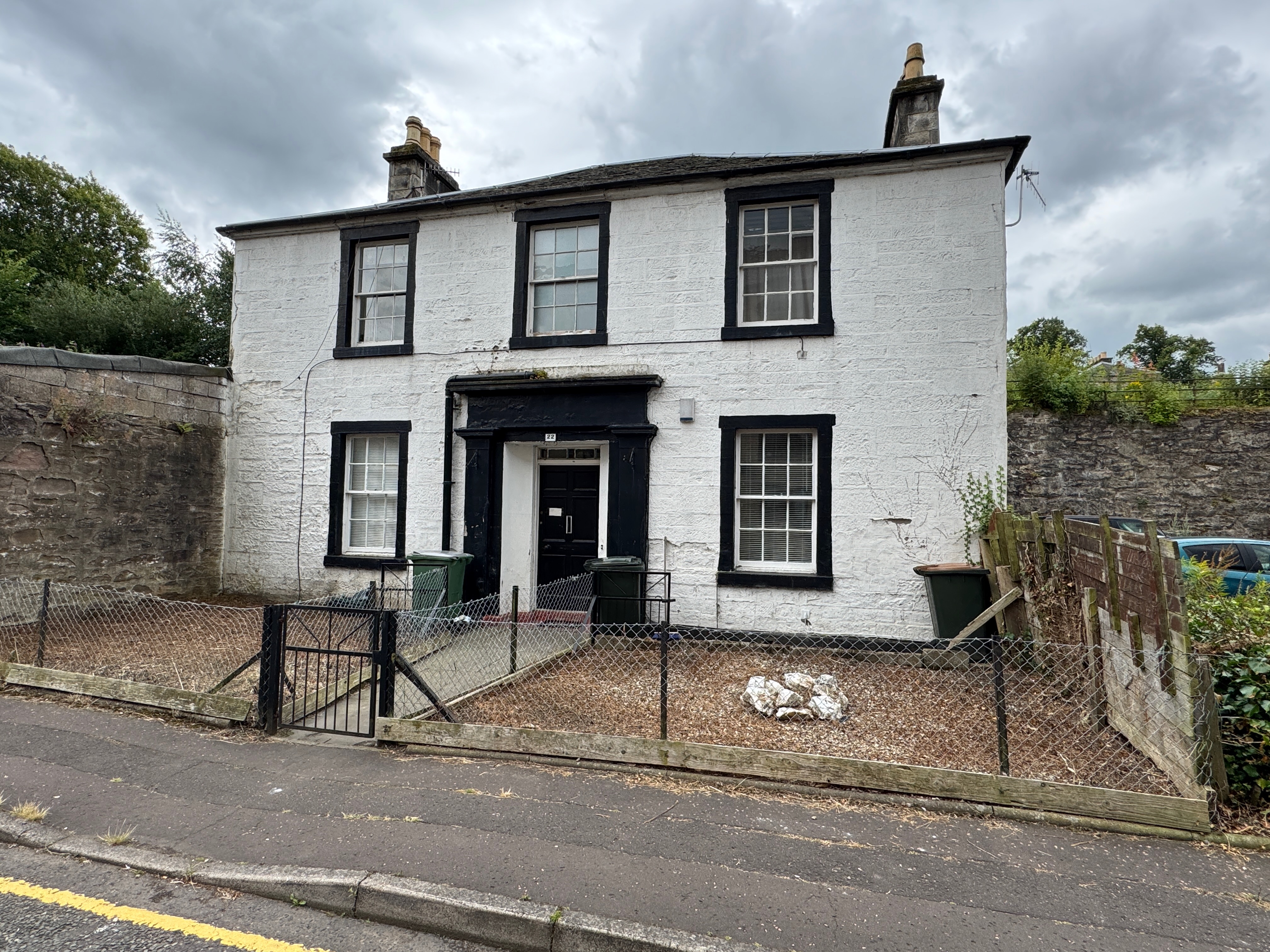
- The building in 2024

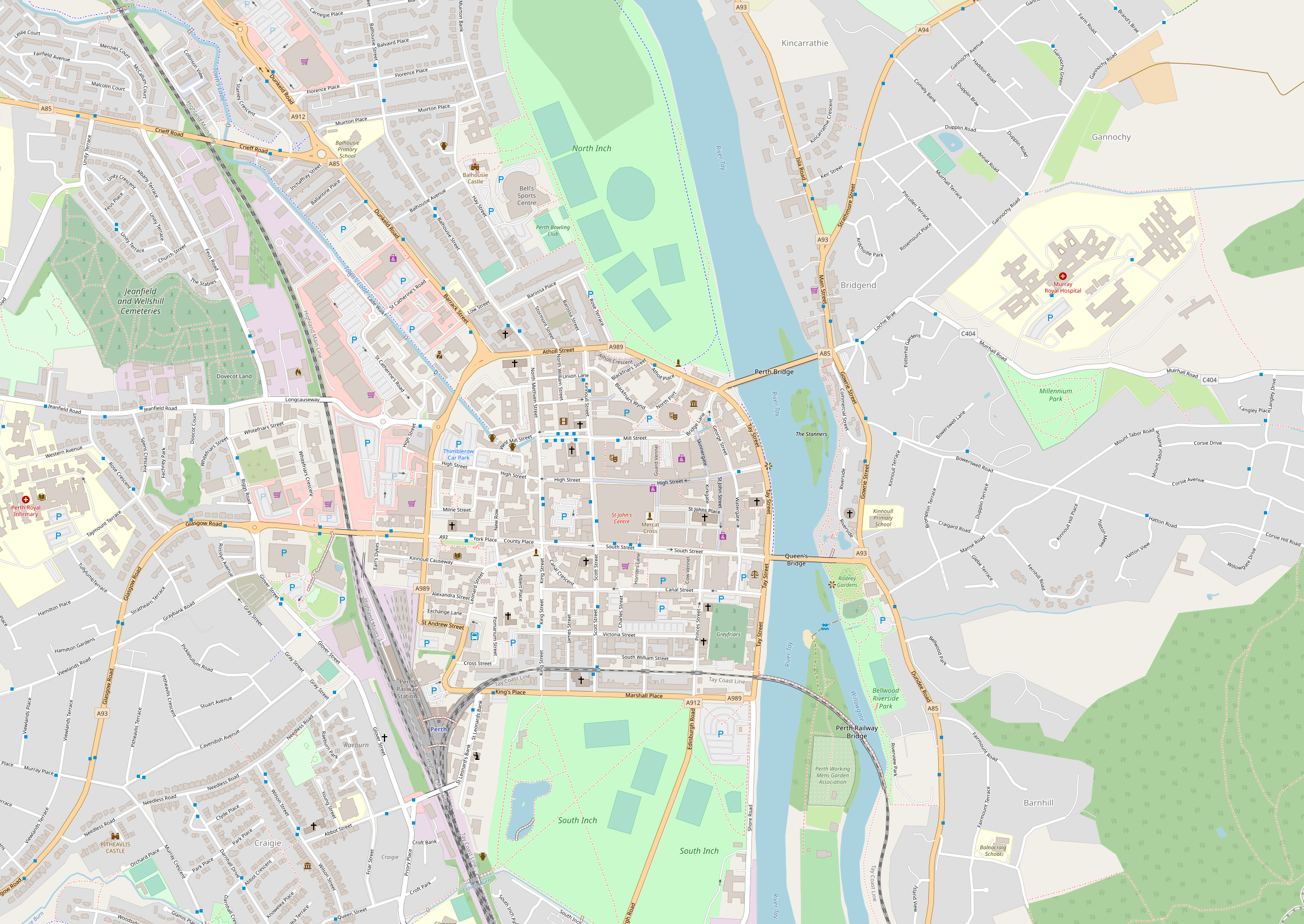
- Shown in Perth
- 56.3927°N 3.4298°W
- Location: 22 South William Street; Perth, Scotland

History
- Built: Early 19th century

Listed Building – Category C(S)
- Designated: 26 August 1977
- Reference no.: LB39649

22 South William Street is a home in Perth, Scotland. Located on South William Street, one block north of the South Inch, it is a Category C listed building, built in the early 19th century.

A two-storey structure, it is three bays with a piend roof. It has a large pilastered and corniced doorpiece. Its exterior walls are painted rubble with dressings in ashlar. At the rear is a full-height bowed stair projection with a coned cap. A small walled garden at the rear adjoins the wall of the viaduct embankment of the Perth to Dundee railway.

In 2009, the home was converted from a single-family to twin occupancy.

Historic Environment Scotland describes the property as "a good, representative example of early 19th century villa construction" and its little-altered exterior "[adds] to its interest and to the architectural and historic value of the wider setting".
