= Perth Playhouse =

Cinema in Perth, Scotland

Coordinates: 56.3980°N 3.4335°W

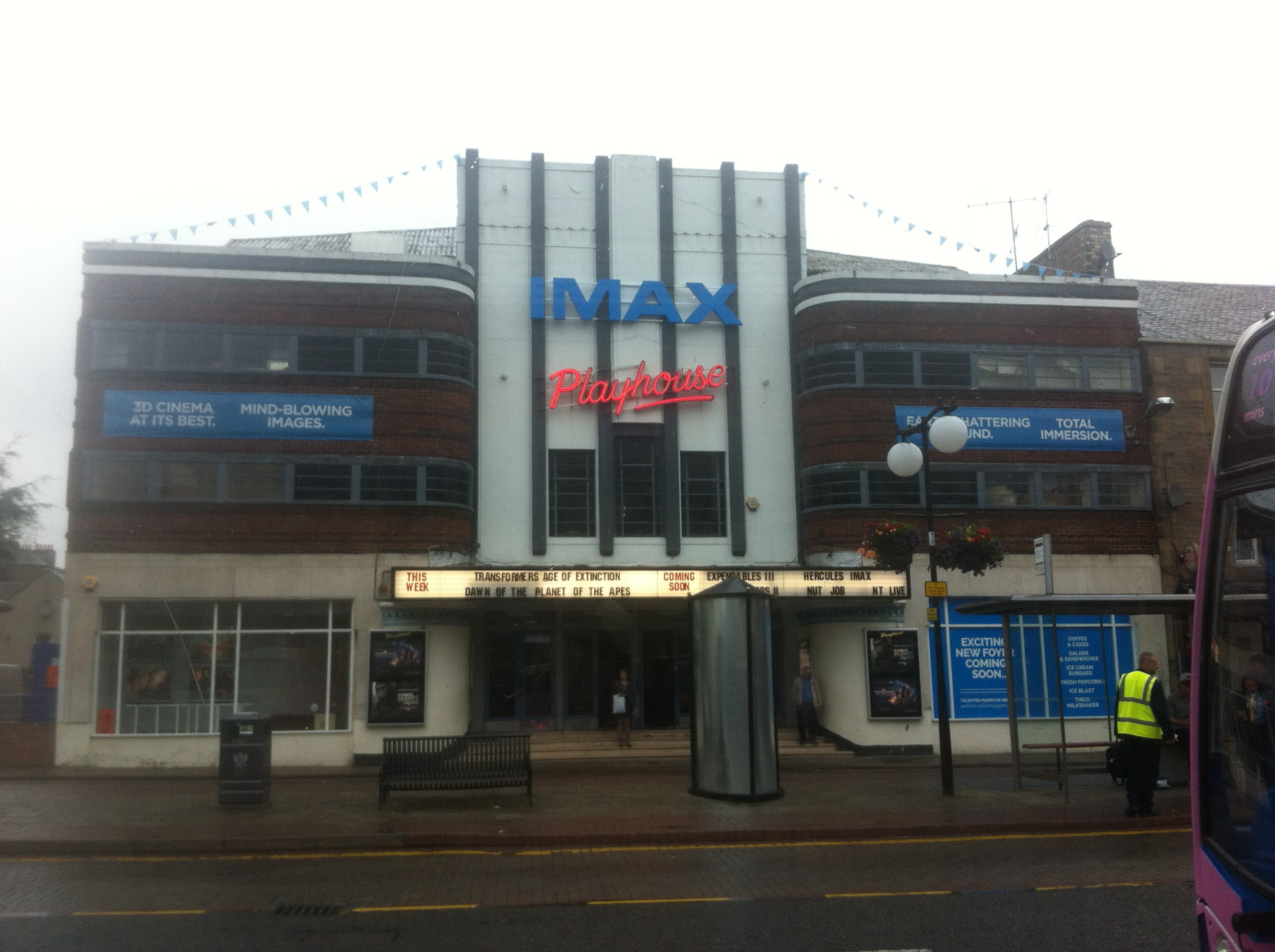
- Interactive map of the Perth Playhouse area

General information
- Architectural style: Art Deco
- Location: 6 Murray Street, Perth, Scotland
- Opened: 1934 (92 years ago)
- Owner: G1 Group

Design and construction
- Architect: Alexander Cattanach Jr.

Website
- www.perthplayhouse.co.uk

Perth Playhouse is an independent cinema in Perth, Scotland.

== History ==
The Perth Playhouse was designed by the architect Alexander Cattanach Jr. and constructed in 1933. It is notable for its distinctive Art Deco style, typical of the period. In 1991, the cinema was categorised as a Category B listed building. Originally owned by Caledonian Associated Cinemas, it was bought by G1 Group in 2013. As of 2018, the building has seven screening rooms of differing sizes and capacity.

== IMAX ==
After being purchased by G1 Group, the cinema received extensive investment. In July 2014, the cinema became the first independent cinema in the UK and the fourth cinema in Scotland to house an IMAX screen. The new screen replaced the existing one in screening room 1, with a size increase of 60%.
