= Andrew Balfour (architect) =

Scottish architect

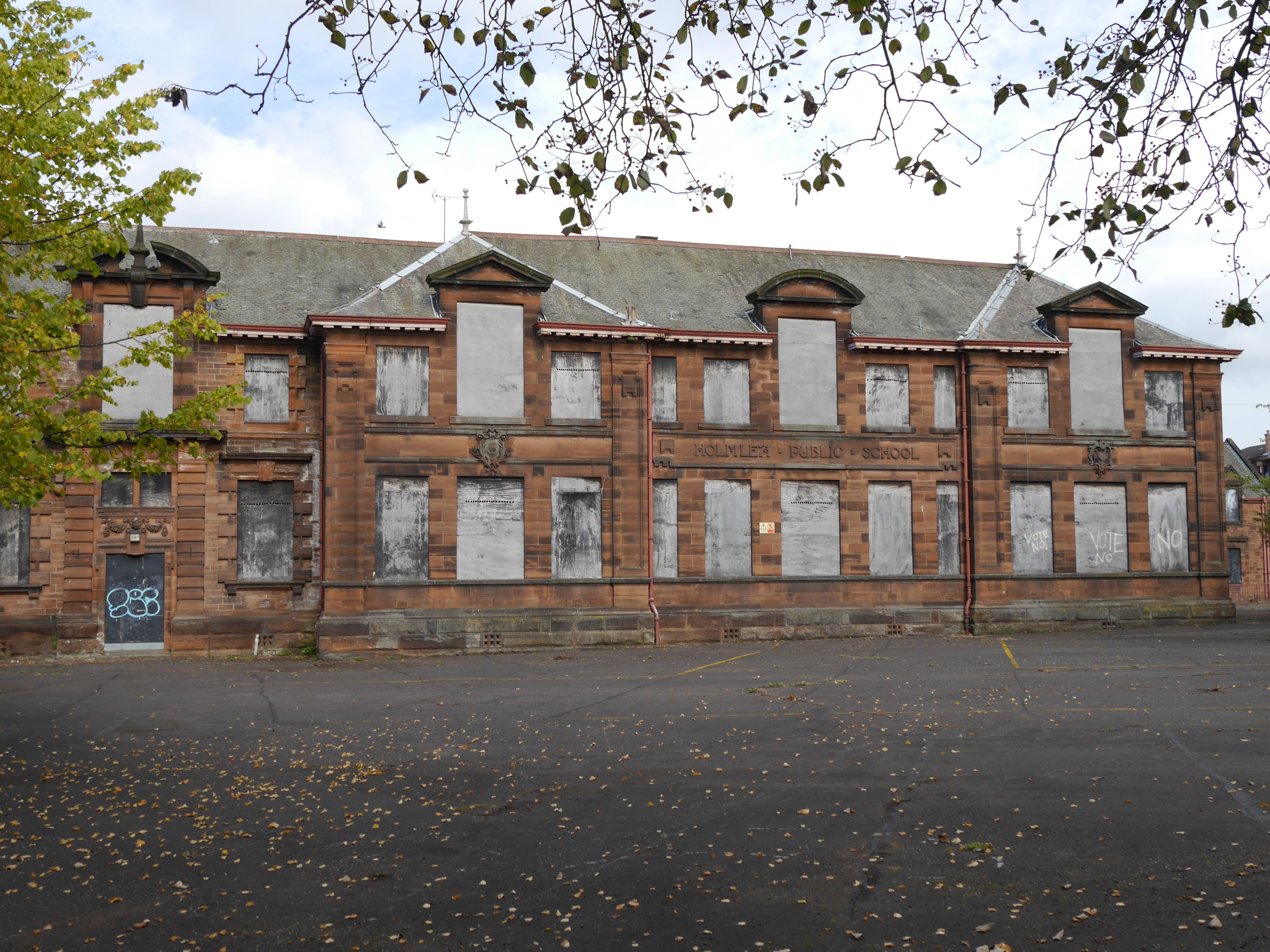
Holmlea Primary School, Glasgow (now closed)

Andrew Balfour FRIBA (1863 – 2 November 1943) was a Scottish architect.

== Early life ==
Andrew Balfour was born in 1863, the son of the baker Thomas Balfour, of Torryburn, Fife, and his wife Mary Campbell.

== Career ==
Together with Harry Steele, he established the firm of Steele & Balfour, which made its name through winning a competition to design Largs Parish Church in 1889. Balfour was admitted FRIBA on 11 June 1906.

Balfour was the architect of the former bank premises that now house The Drum and Monkey in St. Vincent Street, Glasgow and he designed Gillespie Church in Dunfermline which was completed in 1849.

He was the architect of Holmlea Primary School, a Category B listed former school at 352-362 Holmlea Road, Cathcart, Glasgow G44 4BY. It was built in 1908 from red Dumfriesshire ashlar in an Edwardian baroque style. It has been closed since at least 2004, and is currently classified as being in poor condition on the Buildings at Risk Register for Scotland.

== Personal life ==
Balfour died on 2 November 1943 at Rostrevor, Bridge of Weir. He was survived by his wife, Margaret Hood Frew.
