= Bridgend, Perth and Kinross =

Coordinates: 56.4001°N 3.4224°W

Bridgend
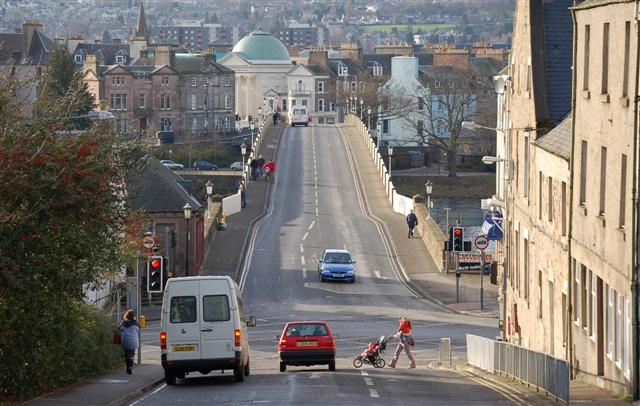
- A 2007 view from Bridgend's East Bridge Street, looking west to Perth city centre

- Location within Perth and Kinross
- Council area: Perth and Kinross
- Lieutenancy area: Perth and Kinross
- Country: Scotland
- Sovereign state: United Kingdom
- Post town: PERTH
- Postcode district: PH2
- Dialling code: 01738
- Police: Scotland
- Fire: Scottish
- Ambulance: Scottish
- UK Parliament: Perth and Kinross-shire
- Scottish Parliament: Perth

Bridgend is a village near Perth, Scotland, approximately 0.25 miles (0.40 km) east of the city centre, on the eastern banks of the River Tay. It is in Kinnoull parish. A settlement has existed here since at least the 16th century.

The main access roads to Bridgend from the centre of Perth are West Bridge Street (the A85, which crosses Perth Bridge) and South Street (which crosses Queen's Bridge).

Due to its location at the bottom of a hill rising to the east, the junction of Main Street and Gowrie Street (known as Bridgend Cross) has become prone to flooding. Torrential rains in July 2011 damaged homes and business after rivers of water flowed down Lochie Brae and Bowerswell Road. After a similar occurrence in September 2015, discussions began about installing flood defences.

== Listed buildings ==
The following buildings in Bridgend are listed structures:

- 1 West Bridge Street (former tollbooth, later J. S. Lees Fish & Poultry Shop)
- 1, 3 Commercial Street (formerly the Cross Keys Hotel and the Strasbourg Rock Club)
- Main Street, numbers 1–5
- Main Street, numbers 2–16
- Main Street, 7, 9, 11
- Inchbank, 26 Main Street
- Earnoch, Main Street
- Newlands, Main Street
- Inveraven, 42 Main Street
- Riversdale, Main Street
- Springbank, Main Street (divided into three flats)
- Ardchoille Lodge, Strathmore Street (formerly Rosemount, later Perth and Kinross District Police)

== Amenities ==
The Bridgend Inn, a Tennent's pub, is located at 69 Main Street, while the Strathmore Bar is at 43 Main Street. The latter was the Strathmore Hotel around the turn of the 20th century and was advertised as having livery stables. Its proprietors in 1907 were Watt and Ramsay.

Bridgend was without its own post office for over a decade, until one opened on West Bridge Street in March 2020, but closed again in April 2022 due to "lower than expected footfall".

== Notable people ==
- James Croll, scientist (1821–1890), worked for Bridgend coffee merchant David Irons
- James Forbes, botanist (1773–1861)
- John Murray Robertson, architect (1844–1901), died at Crossmount in Bridgend
- George Seton, philanthropist (1822–1908)

== Gallery ==
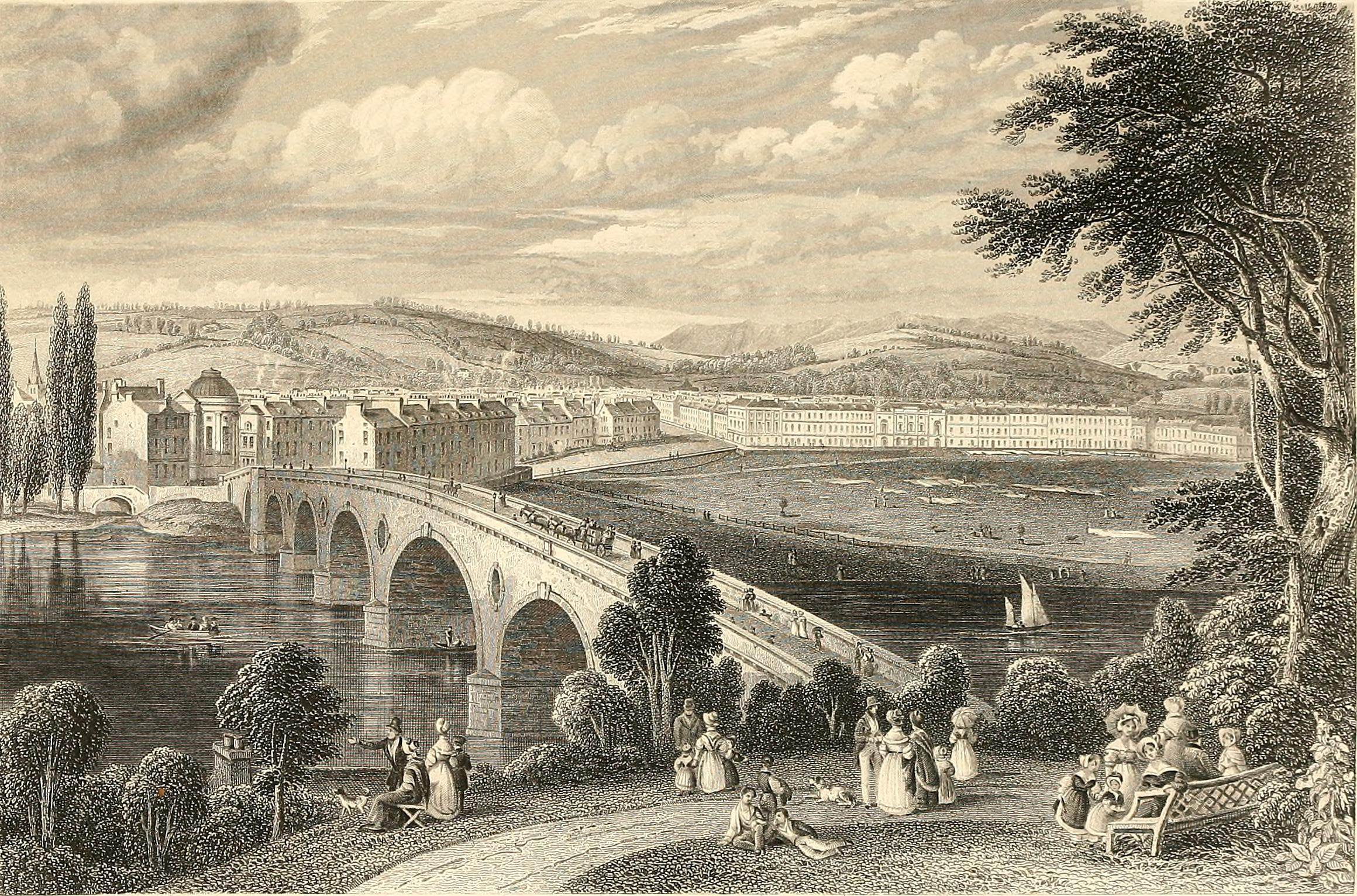
Perth Bridge as it was before being widened in 1869

A circa-1903 view. Many of the buildings here are now gone; see following modern image

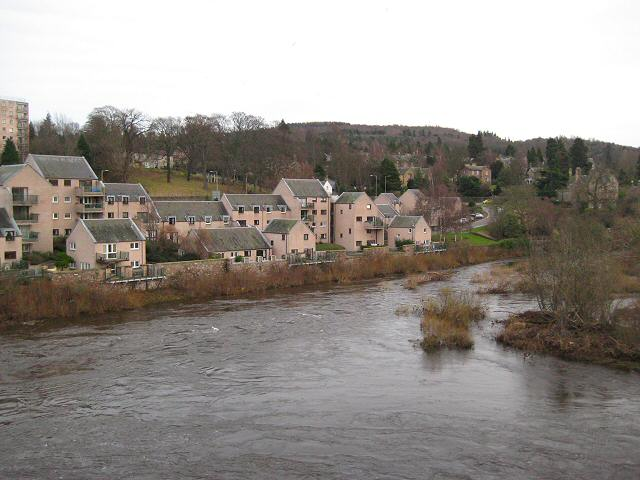
Flats and maisonettes on Commercial Street in Bridgend, looking southeast from Perth Bridge

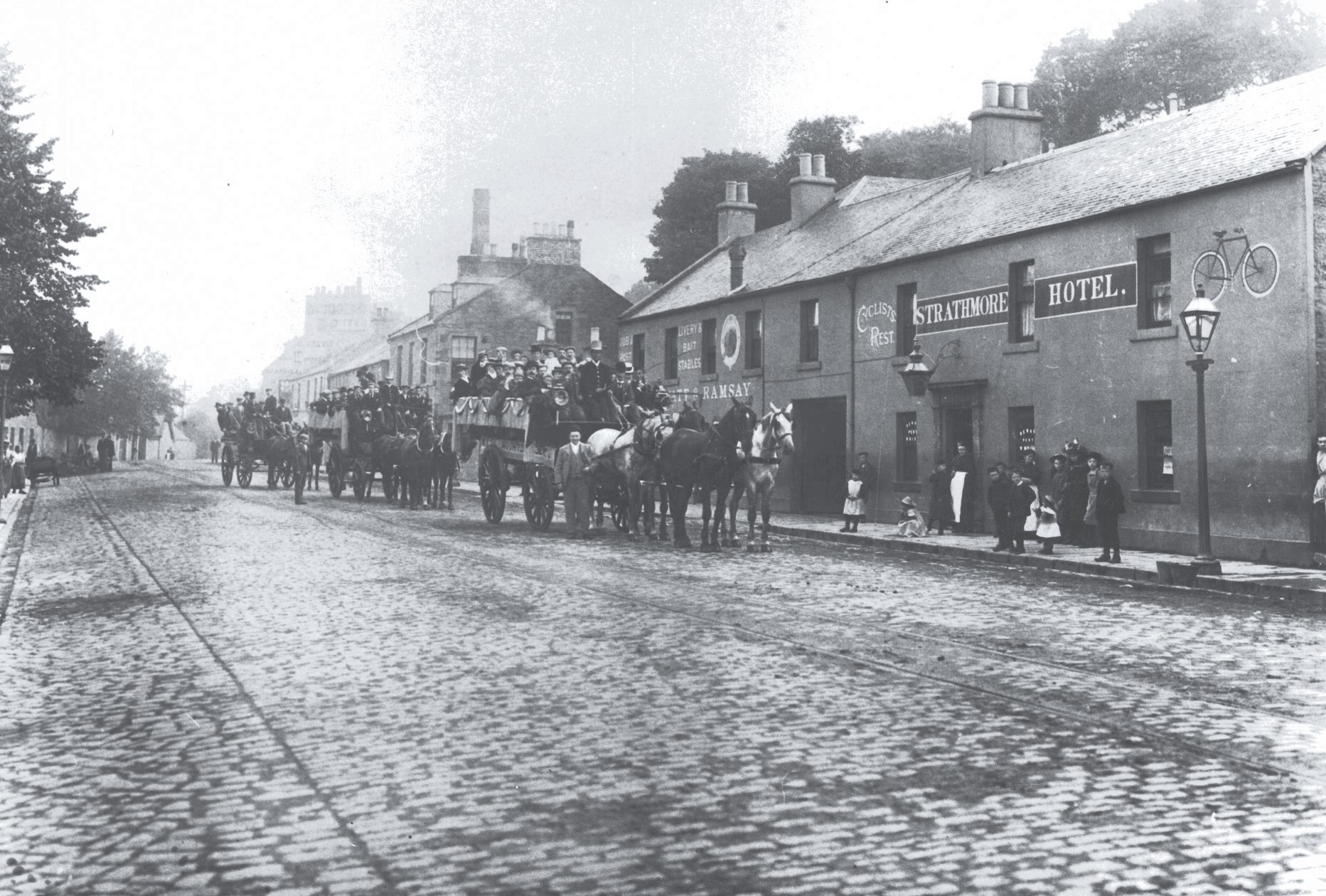
Strathmore Hotel, Main Street, 1893

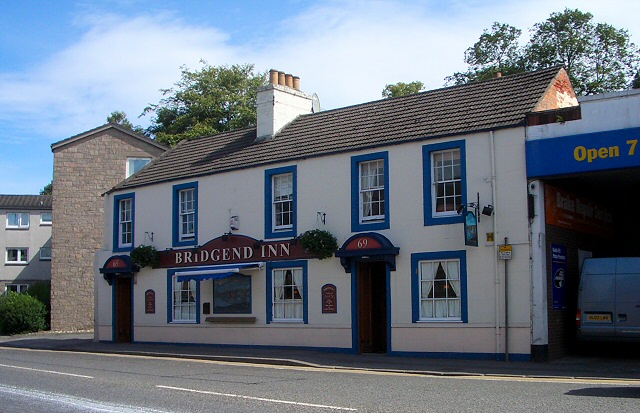
Bridgend Inn, pictured in 2007

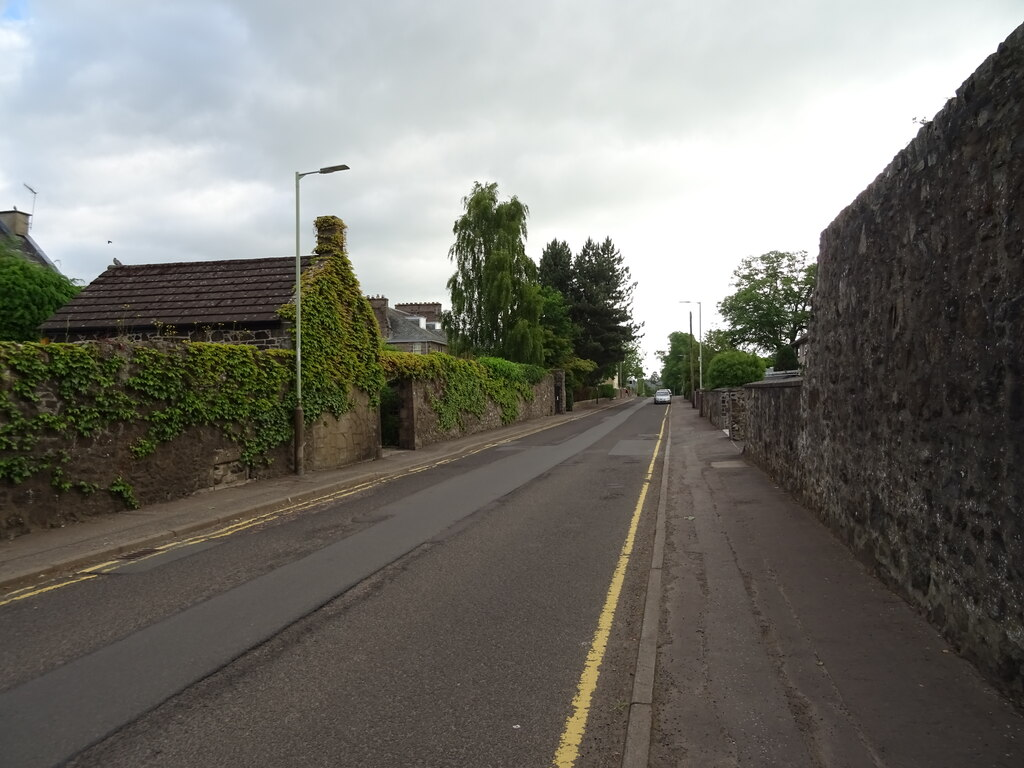
Gannochy Road, leading up the hill from Bridgend

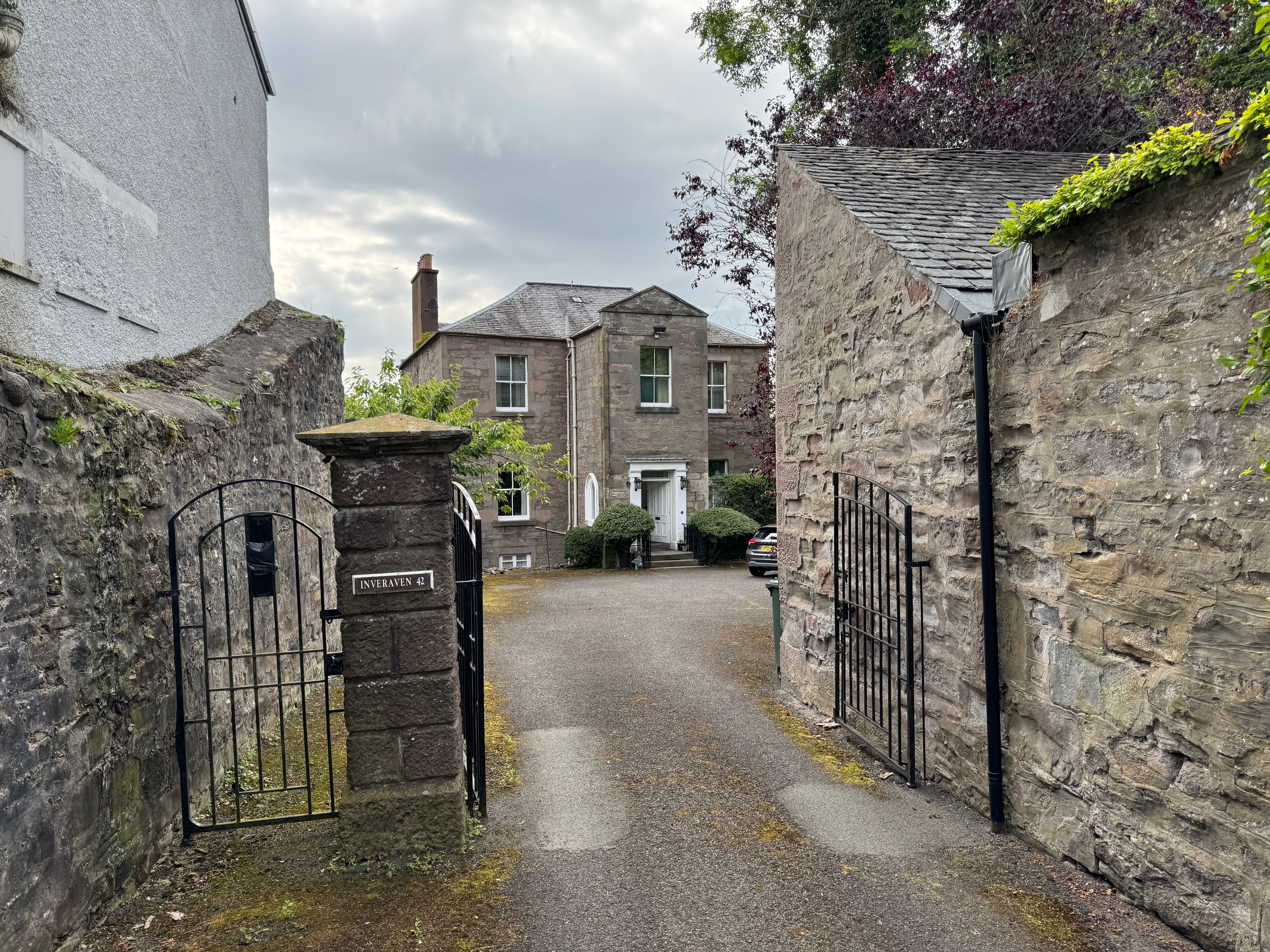
Inveraven, 42 Main Street
