= Ardchoille Lodge =

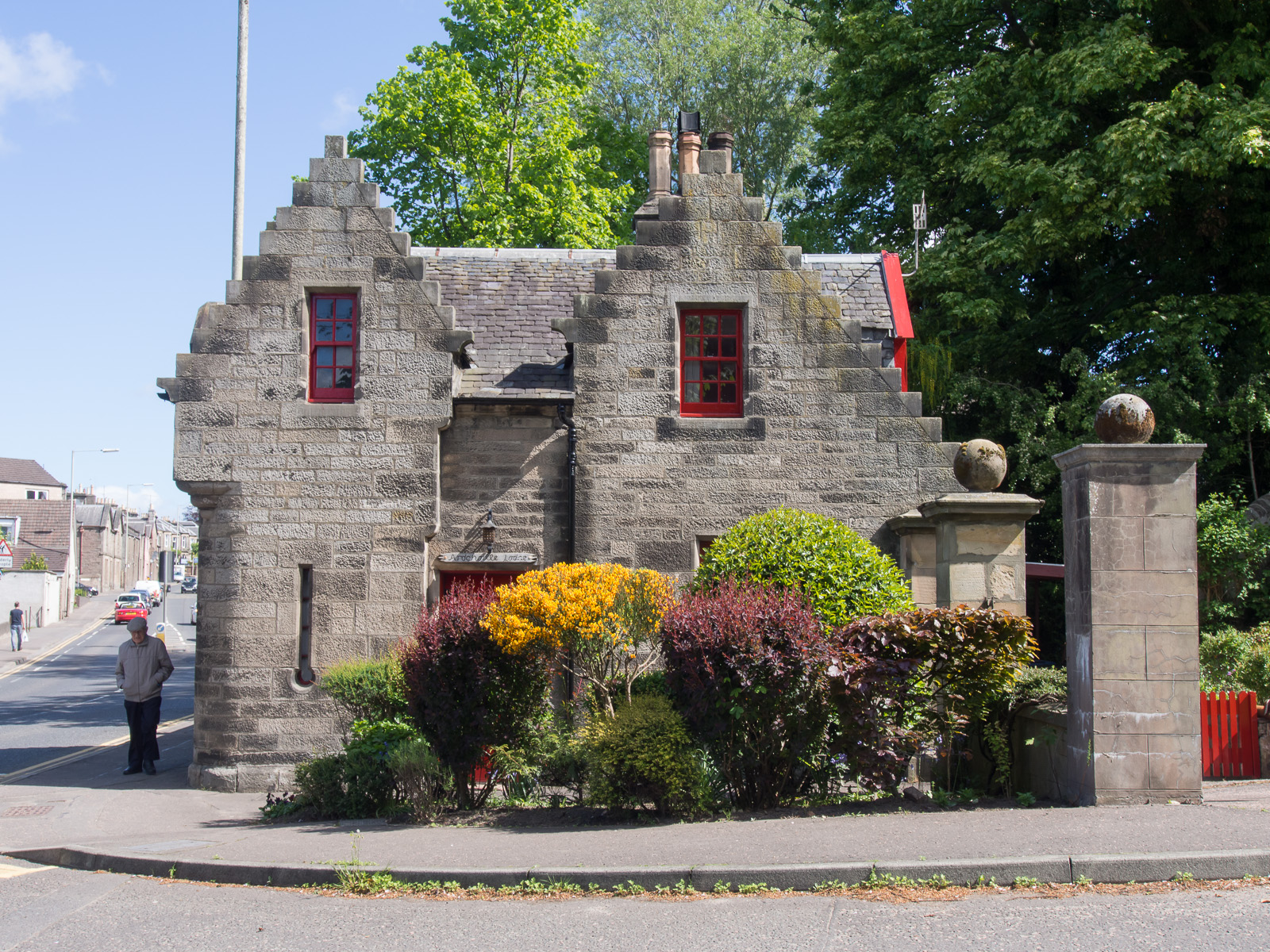
- The building in 2013

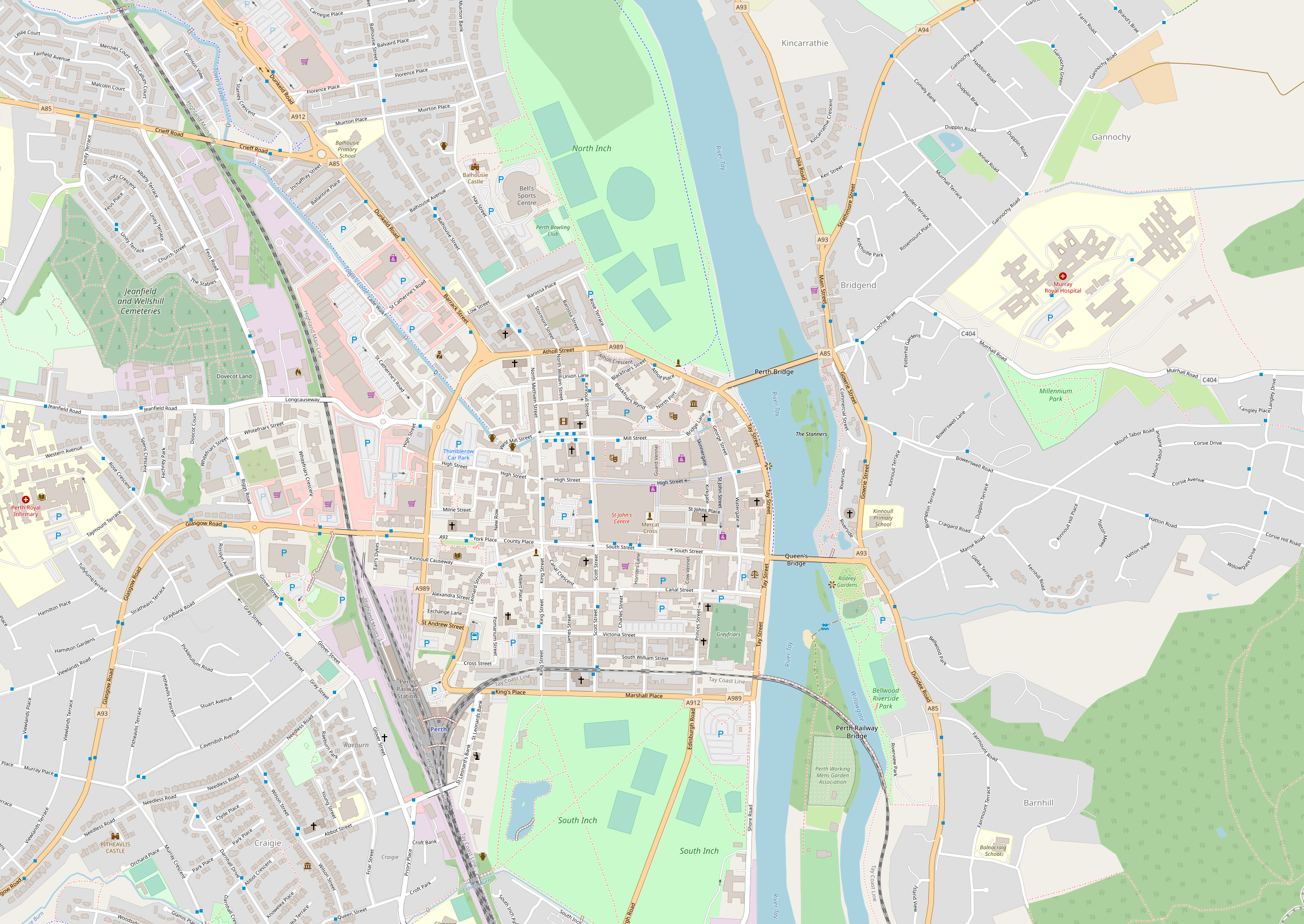
- Shown in Perth and Kinross
- 56.4022°N 3.4225°W
- Location: Strathmore Street; Bridgend; Perth and Kinross; Scotland

History
- Built: 1851

Site notes
- Architectural style: Scottish Baronial

Listed Building – Category C(S)
- Designated: 26 August 1977
- Reference no.: LB39551

Ardchoille Lodge is an historic building in Bridgend, Perth and Kinross, Scotland. Located on Strathmore Street, it is a Category C listed building, built in 1851. It was the gatehouse to the 1851-built Ardchoille House.
