= Alexander Petrie (architect) =

Scottish architect, c. 1842–1905

- Born: c. 1842
- Died: 1905
- Occupation: Architect
- Buildings: Scott Street Methodist Church, Perth, Scotland

Alexander Petrie (c. 1842–1905) was a Scottish architect, prominent in the second half of the 19th century and first half of the 20th. He designed several notable buildings, mainly churches, several of which are now of listed status.

== Life and career ==
Petrie was born in Paisley around 1842.

After gaining an interest in architecture, he became a pupil of John Thomas Rochead and began working in Glasgow in 1871. His practice was continued by his sons as A. Petrie & Sons upon his death in 1905.

=== Selected notable works ===
- Scott Street Methodist Church, Perth, Scotland (1879) – now Category C listed
- Dowanhill Free Church, Glasgow, Scotland (1880) – now Category C listed
- Livingston Parish Church, Stevenston, Scotland (1886)
- Kilbirnie Free Church, Kilbirnie, Scotland (1887)
- Anniesland Cross United Presbyterian Church, Anniesland, Scotland (1898)

== Death ==
Petrie died in 1905, aged around 63.
