= Newlands House =

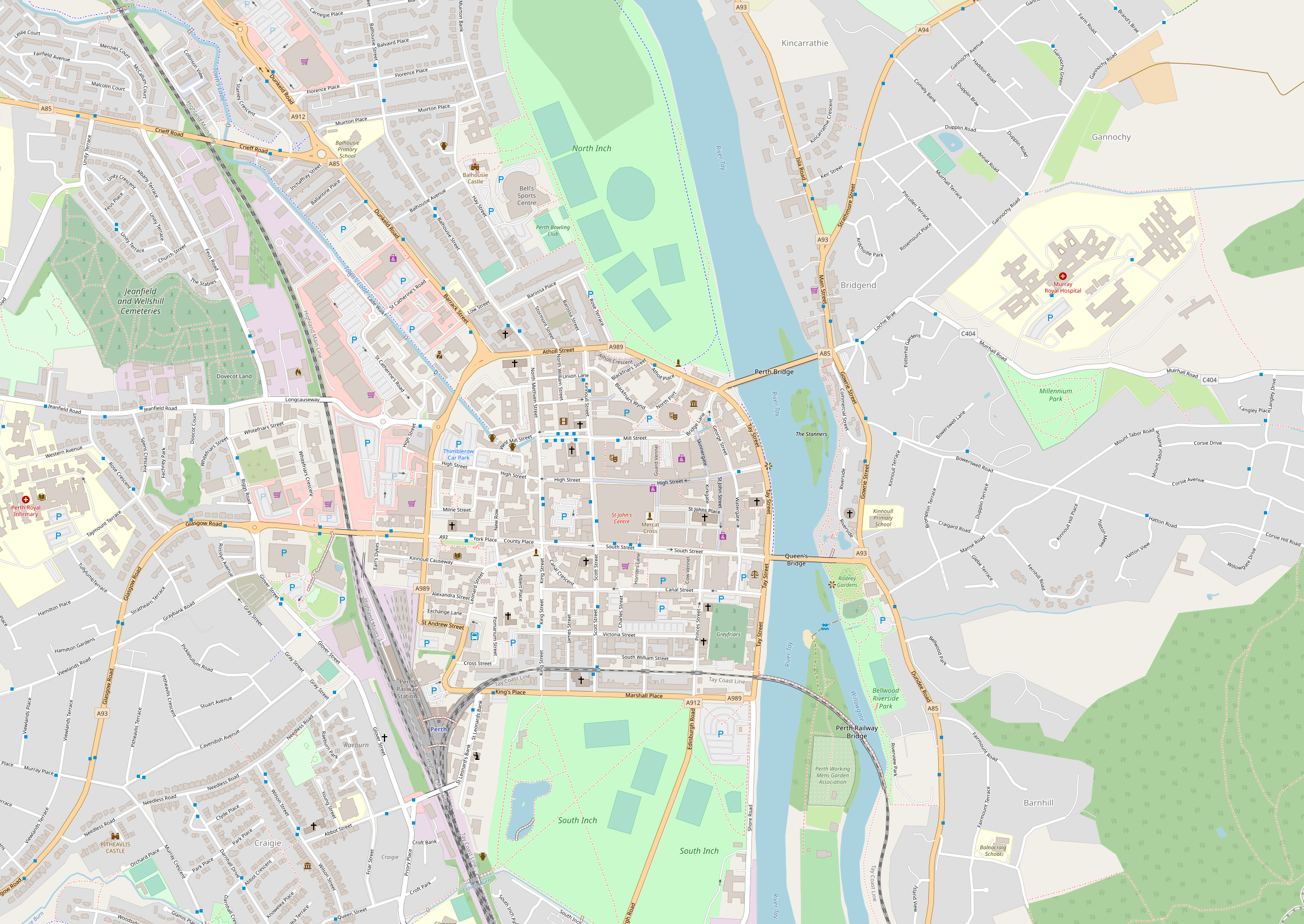
- Shown in Bridgend
- 56.400510°N 3.424262°W
- Location: Main Street; Bridgend; Perth and Kinross; Scotland

History
- Built: c. 1810

Listed Building – Category B
- Designated: 20 May 1965
- Reference no.: LB39543

Newlands House is an historic building in Bridgend, Perth and Kinross, Scotland. Located on Main Street, it is a Category B listed building, built around 1810.

It was originally built for Reverend (d. 1861) and Mrs John Newlands.

Five other contemporary properties are located here, one on Main Street and four, which cannot be seen from the street, facing the River Tay and the southern end of the North Inch on the opposite bank. Firstly, on Main Street is Inchbank (Category B listed, built in 1795 by its owner, master stonemason John Gregory). Currently the home of Strang & McLagan Funeral Directors, the building features two pairings of Ionic order columns. Facing the river are: Inveraven (Category B, c. 1810), Riversdale (Category C, c. 1810), Earnoch (Category B, c. 1823) and Springbank (Category B, c. 1823).
