= Rumrich spy case =

1938 espionage trial in the US

In 1938, eighteen individuals in the United States were indicted on charges of spying for Nazi Germany. The case resulted in four criminal convictions. The case was named after Guenther Gustave Maria Rumrich, a United States Army sergeant turned deserter who pleaded guilty to espionage and agreed to testify on behalf of the US government. All four individuals served time in prison, with sentences ranging from two to six years. The case was the first major international spy case for the Federal Bureau of Investigation (FBI).

== Background, spying, and arrests ==
Guenther Gustave Maria Rumrich was a United States Army sergeant turned deserter who pleaded guilty to espionage and agreed to testify on behalf of the US government. Johanna Hoffman was a hairdresser on the liner SS Europa. Enrich Glaser was a soldier based at Mitchel Field in Long Island, New York, and Otto Voss was an airplane mechanic.

Rumrich stated Hoffman served as a go-between on the Europa to convey messages between his contact person in Germany, Karl Schlueter, and himself and the other spies in America. Before his capture, under the codename "Crown", Rumrich mailed letters to Jessie Jordan, a Scottish woman who was a spy for the Abwehr, in which he mentioned a plan for German secret service agents to physically overpower an American army colonel at the Hotel McAlpin in Manhattan, New York City. The colonel would be carrying East Coast defense plans for the United States in the situation of war, and the agents would take the plans. Afterward, the agents would leave behind clues which indicated communists were behind the operation. German recruiter for the Nazi spy network Ignatz Theodor Griebl was described by historian Rhodri Jeffreys-Jones as the true "mastermind" behind the spy ring, with Rumrich described as a "minor cog". Griebl was arrested but released on bail and escaped to Europe before trial.

Rumrich provided Germany with information on Coast Artillery Corps operations in the Panama Canal Zone. Rumrich was arrested on February 14, 1938, after impersonating Secretary of State Cordell Hull and trying to obtain 35 blank United States passports to deliver to the German government.

== Trial ==
The trial occurred in Manhattan Federal Court under judge John C. Knox. Jury selection began on October 14, 1938, the same day on which Rumrich pleaded guilty. Lamar Hardy prosecuted the case.

In court, Rumrich stated a contact person in Germany gave him instructions to determine how many US soldiers were stationed on the country's east coast, and specifically around the New York City area. Rumrich testified he went out of touch with Nazi Germany for a period of about six months, after which he requested financial support from them. On the fourth day during his testimony, Rumrich stated Glaser obtained two pages of a manual which explained how to contact US airplanes while flying, and gave him the two pages; Rumrich in turn gave them to Schlueter.

== Aftermath ==
Hoffman was sentenced to four years in prison, Rumrich and Glaser to two years each, and Voss to six years. In The FBI: A Comprehensive Reference Guide, Tony Poveda, Susan Rosenfeld, and Richard Powers cite the case as "the first major prewar espionage case", and the FBI cites it as its first major international spy case. Intelligence was gathered by FBI detective Leon G. Turrou, who wrote articles about his experiences as a detective. These articles became the book Nazi Spies in America, in turn, became the movie Confessions of a Nazi Spy. According to Jeffreys-Jones, the case highlighted to President Franklin D. Roosevelt the need for a "stronger counterespionage provision" in America, and highlighted an "immediate national security problem".
