= Jessie Jordan =

Scottish hairdresser and German spy

- Born: 23 December 1887; Glasgow, Scotland
- Died: 1954 (aged 66–67); Hamburg, West Germany
- Occupation: Hairdresser
- Known for: Spying for Germany
- Spouses: Frederick Jordan; Baur Bamgarten
- Children: 2

Jessie Jordan (23 December 1887 – 1954) was a Scottish hairdresser who was found guilty of spying for the German Abwehr (military intelligence) on the eve of World War II. She had married again after her German husband died fighting for Germany, before she became a spy in Scotland. She was imprisoned and deported to Germany after the war ended.

== Early life ==
Jordan was born in Glasgow, Scotland, in 1887, the daughter of Elizabeth Wallace, an unmarried domestic servant. Later in her life, Jordan claimed that her father, a William Ferguson, had abandoned her mother to go to Canada, but there is no name on her birth certificate. Her mother married widower John Haddow, with whom she had five more children. For a time, Jordan lived with her mother and stepfather in Lanark and later at 23 Friar Street in Craigie, Perth, Scotland. By the 1901 census, she had adopted her stepfather's surname, Haddow. At the age of 16, she ran away from home and found work as a maid in a number of towns in Scotland and England. In 1907, she met a German waiter, Frederick Jordan, whom she married in 1912. Jordan lived in Germany almost exclusively until 1937, becoming a German citizen by marriage. She returned to Perth briefly in 1919 after her husband was killed on the Western Front in 1918. In 1920, she was back in Germany, where she married her husband's cousin Baur Bamgarten. By 1936, that marriage had ended in divorce, at which time she returned to Scotland.

Jordan had two children: a son, Werner Tillkes; and a daughter, Marga. Marga became an actress and singer. She married Hamburg merchant Hermann Wobrock.

== Return to Scotland ==
Several causes have been attributed to Jordan's decision to return to Scotland. Her marriage had failed and she saw herself as an "unwanted child" of Scotland as well as Germany, and as her legal counsel would later claim during her trial, "the name of Jordan had in Germany a Jewish significance." In her 2014 article on Jordan, Rhodri Jeffreys-Jones noted that the hairdressing business that Jordan ran in Hamburg was suffering owing to the predominance of Jewish customers. The implementation of the Nazis' New Order caused another contributing factor to Jordan's move back to Scotland: when her daughter Marga attempted to return to her acting career she was required by German authorities to provide proof of an "Aryan" descent on her mother's side. In July 1937, Jordan told the Glasgow Police Alien Registration Department that she was returning to Scotland to reconnect with her family and to find proof of Marga's Aryan descent.

== Espionage ==
Back in Scotland, Jordan set up a hairdressing business in Dundee, spending a significant amount of money refurbishing her new premises. By this time she had already been recruited by the Abwehr (military intelligence), and her motivations for agreeing to spy are unclear. One suggested motivation has been her ties to Germany as her adopted home: Jordan claimed that by the time she had returned to Scotland she had spent so many years in Germany that she no longer spoke English fluently, but she also claimed later that she had been ordered to spy for Germany, and that she "had no passion for any country". Other motivations, including money and blackmail, have also been raised as possibilities. Reporting on her trial, The Dundee Courier speculated that "it does not appear that Mrs Jordan took to spying because of love of Germany or hatred of Britain, or even from a desire to make money from it. She has apparently been chosen as an instrument by agents aware of her personal history, and in a position to put her under some sort of pressure to do what was required of her."

Jordan's position as a spy was deemed by an MI5 interrogator to be that of a beginner. Her hairdressing business became what MI5 referred to as a "post box": German agents already established in the United States would send parcels and letters to the business, and Jordan would forward them on to agents in Amsterdam, and from there the information would be sent to the Abwehr headquarters. In addition, Jordan was found to possess maps of Scotland and Northern England marked with the location of key military sites. During her trial she claimed that she was only confirming information that the German authorities had already gathered.

Jordan's activities were exposed when Mary Curran, a cleaner employed at the salon, found maps in the shop; she and her husband reported her findings to the Dundee police and, eventually, MI5. Although MI5 were already surveilling Jordan, they were unaware of the Dundee shop. As a result of Curran's report, the address of the salon on Kinloch Street was added to an ongoing mail watch, after which point incriminating post from the United States was discovered. The recovered mail indicated, among other things, a plot to assassinate a United States Army colonel, Henry Eglin.

=== Arrest and imprisonment ===
On 2 March 1938, Jordan was arrested. She was found guilty of espionage and sentenced to four years imprisonment in March 1939. She was initially sent to Saughton Prison, during which time she became unwell and underwent an invasive operation that included a sub-total hysterectomy. When World War II started, Jordan was transferred to Aberdeen Prison. Her incarceration had a serious impact on her daughter's life as well; despite a second marriage to Glaswegian Tom Reid, Marga struggled financially and died in January 1939 as a result of what her husband called an "illegal operation".

During her time in prison, Jordan was described by her Dundee solicitor J. R. Bond as "a model prisoner, who showed off her needlework and exhibited no interest in an appeal". Bond further noted that "she is not in the least depressed". As a result of this good behaviour, Jordan was granted early release in 1941, but was immediately arrested and interned as an enemy alien. She remained in this internment throughout the war, and after the war ended she was deported to Germany. Jordan died in Hamburg in 1954, aged 66 or 67.

=== Strategic impact on World War Two ===
Jordan's detection led to the exposure of a German spy in the USA codenamed 'Agent Crown'. MI5 passed information about him to the US authorities and they in turn unearthed a spy network in the USA consisting of eighteen agents and dozens of accomplices. Due to mistakes of FBI criminal investigator Leon G. Turrou most of the ring managed to flee, but the 1938 trial of the rest still turned the American public significantly against Nazi Germany. It is postulated that American anti-Nazi feeling fed into the Japanese decision to bomb Pearl Harbor and for Germany to swiftly enter the war as Japan's ally.

== Bibliography ==
- Jeffreys-Jones, Ring of Spies, published by the Gloucestershire-based UK publishers, The History Press. (2020)
