= Craigie, Perth, Scotland =

Coordinates: 56.3889°N 3.4449°W

Craigie
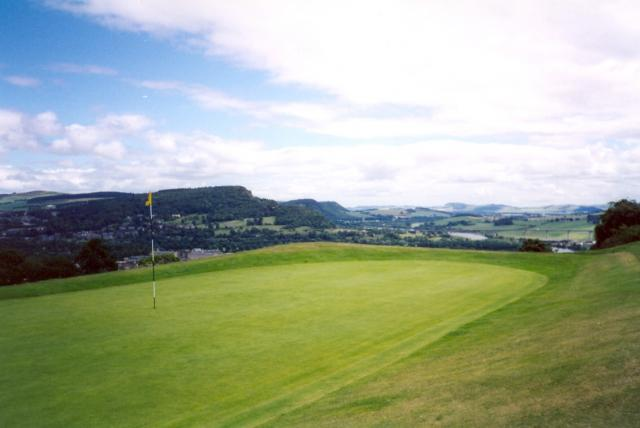
- View to the northeast from the 5th green of Craigie Hill golf course, 2001

- Location within Perth and Kinross
- Council area: Perth and Kinross
- Lieutenancy area: Perth and Kinross
- Country: Scotland
- Sovereign state: United Kingdom
- Post town: PERTH
- Postcode district: PH1
- Dialling code: 01738
- Police: Scotland
- Fire: Scottish
- Ambulance: Scottish
- UK Parliament: Perth and Kinross-shire
- Scottish Parliament: Perthshire South and Kinross-shire

Craigie (formerly Craigie Knowes) is a residential area of Perth, Scotland, immediately to the south and southwest of the city centre, beyond the South Inch. It is situated in the foothills of the 430 feet (130 m) St Magdalene's Hill, over which the M90 motorway passes, as does the B9112. It is separated from the city by the Highland Main Line.

Craigie Hill, a section of St Magdalene's Hill and towards the eastern end of Gask Ridge, is home to Craigie Hill Golf Club, an 18-hole golf course established in 1911. A pitch and putt course was formerly located on the hill. Its registered office was at 52 Tay Street.

Craigie Burn flows down from Craigie Hill, along the southern edge of the South Inch, en route to discharging into the River Tay.

== Transport ==
Craigie can be reached via the number 5 bus from the centre of Perth.

== Notable people ==
- Arthur Kinmond Bell, philanthropist, was born on Moncreiffe Terrace in Craigie
- Jessie Jordan, spy, lived at 23 Friar Street in her childhood

== Map ==
In this 1832 map of Perth by James Gardner, the land now partly occupied by Craigie belonged to the Glovers
