= Confessions of a Nazi Spy =

1939 film

- 1939 Theatrical Poster
- Directed by: Anatole Litvak
- Screenplay by: Milton Krims; John Wexley
- Based on: Nazi Spies in America; 1939 book by Leon G. Turrou Newspaper Articles; 1938-9 stories in The New York Post by: Leon G. Turrou; David G. Wittels
- Produced by: Hal B. Wallis; Jack L. Warner; Robert Lord
- Starring: Edward G. Robinson; Francis Lederer; George Sanders; Paul Lukas
- Narrated by: John Deering
- Cinematography: Sol Polito; Ernest Haller (uncredited)
- Edited by: Owen Marks
- Music by: Max Steiner
- Color process: Black and white
- Distributed by: Warner Bros. Pictures
- Release date: May 6, 1939
- Running time: 104 minutes
- Country: United States
- Language: English
- Budget: $1.5 Million

Confessions of a Nazi Spy is a 1939 American spy political thriller film directed by Anatole Litvak for Warner Bros. Pictures. It was the first explicitly anti-Nazi film to be produced by a major Hollywood studio, being released in May 1939, four months before the beginning of World War II in Europe, and two and a half years before the United States' official entry into the war.

The film stars Edward G. Robinson, Francis Lederer, George Sanders, Paul Lukas, and a large cast of German actors, including some who had emigrated from their country after the rise of Adolf Hitler. Many of the German actors who appeared in the film changed their names for fear of reprisals against relatives still living in Germany. Harry, Albert, and Jack Warner, who then owned Warner Bros, were Jewish.

The film's story is based on a series of articles by FBI officer Leon G. Turrou, recounting his investigation of Nazi spy rings in the United States. Parts of the film are drawn from the Rumrich spy case, the first major international espionage case in American history.

== Plot ==
A silhouetted narrator connects the film to recent events, beginning in a quiet corner of Scotland in 1937. A postman delivers letters from all over the world to a Mrs. MacLaughlin, who forwards the contents of one envelope to Dr. Karl Kassel in New York City. Later, Kassel harangues an audience of German-Americans at the Café Nuremberg. Most are wearing the uniform of the German American Bund. He tells them that the Führer has declared war on the evils of democracy and that, as Germans, they should carry out his wishes and claim power. The crowd salutes, "Sieg Heil!"

Kurt Schneider, an unemployed malcontent, is inspired to become a spy and writes to Hitler's personal newspaper. German Naval Intelligence knows that he is not a double agent because the Americans have no formal counterespionage system. Franz Schlager, a naval officer sailing to New York on the steamship Bismarck, is ordered to contact Schneider. Meanwhile, beauty operator Hilda Kleinhauer informs on her clients to the Gestapo and carries material for Schlager.

An American Legionnaire challenges Kassel at a meeting. He and others speaking out for democracy are attacked.

Schneider boasts to his friend Werner, a private in the Air Corps, that he receives instructions from Hitler. Werner gets the Z code, and Schneider obtains medical records that reveal troop strength in New York. Schneider proudly gives Schlager the information and receives $50 a month, Mrs. MacLaughlin's address, and a list of new objectives.

Kassel is called back to Germany. He takes his mistress, Erika Wolff, and leaves his wife behind. The narrator provides a dramatic description of the fascist way of life. Kassel is put in charge of all Nazi activities in the United States. Under the slogan, "America for Americans," the country is flooded with propaganda while spies target military operations.

Thanks to the postman's curiosity, British Military Intelligence uncovers Mrs. MacLaughlin's role as postmistress for a worldwide network of spies. American military intelligence in New York, consisting of Major Williams and one assistant, turns to the FBI for help in exposing spies, although it has never played that role before. FBI Agent Ed Renard takes the case.

Upon his return to the United States, Kassel visits Camp Horst Wessel, where German-American children are trained in Nazi ideals and military skills.

Schneider is instructed to use an alias to obtain passports, which arouses suspicion. The FBI follows the package containing the passports and arrests him. Learning his true identity, they realize that they have a letter that he sent to MacLaughlin. Renard flatters him for hours and extracts a detailed confession. Through Schneider, Renard finds Wenz, Kleinhauer and Kassel aboard the Bismarck in port. Kassel proudly shows Renard his files on important Americans that document their racial "impurity". He tries to burn the code key, but Renard stops him. Renard confronts him with Kleinhauer, who confirms his link with Schlager.

When Renard reveals that he knows about Erika, Kassel confesses everything about the German spy organization, revealing the intricacy and scope of the network. He is released, and the Gestapo are waiting. He swears that he revealed nothing, but the men are arrested outside his apartment building.

A federal dragnet captures many agents and their accomplices. On March 13, 1938, Hitler annexes Austria. Renard warns Kassel's wife that the Gestapo men have made bail. Karl returns home from meeting Erika and lies to his wife. He packs, refusing to take her with him. She does not warn him. The Gestapo capture him and take him to the Bismarck. He is told to claim that he was tortured by FBI agents and forced to sign a false confession. In New York, Hilda receives the same instructions.

Eighteen people are indicted for espionage. Four are in custody: Schneider, Wenz, Kleinhauer and Helldorf. US Attorney Kellogg describes the role of a network of German fifth columnists in the United States and in the Nazi conquest of Europe. He calls for Americans to take a lesson, reviewing Hitler's march through Europe, demonstrating “the supremacy of organized propaganda backed by force.” The spies are convicted.

Over coffee, Kellogg and Renard discuss events in America and Europe. Renard describes Nazis as "insane." Kellogg believes that "when our basic liberties are threatened, we wake up."

The credits roll to America the Beautiful in march time.

== Cast ==
- Edward G. Robinson as Edward Renard
- Francis Lederer as Kurt Schneider
- George Sanders as Franz Schlager
- Paul Lukas as Dr. Karl Kassel
- Henry O'Neill as U.S. Atty. Kellogg
- Dorothy Tree as Hilda Kleinhauer
- Lya Lys as Erika Wolff
- Grace Stafford as Helen Schneider
- James Stephenson as British Military Intelligence agent
- Hedwiga Reicher as Lisa Kassel
- Joe Sawyer as Werner Renz
- Sig Ruman as Dr. Julius Krogmann
- Lionel Royce as Hintze
- Henry Victor as Hans Wildebrandt
- Hans Heinrich von Twardowski as Max Helldorf
- Wolfgang Zilzer as Johann Westphal
- Rudolph Anders as Capt. Wilhelm Straubel
- Eily Malyon as Mrs. MacLaughlin

Uncredited

- Martin Kosleck as Joseph Goebbels
- Lisa Golm as Mrs. Anna Westphal
- Ward Bond as American Legionnaire
- Creighton Hale as Draftsman
- John Hamilton as FBI Chief

=== Casting notes ===
Several actors in the film were expatriates from Germany and other European countries living in the United States, some of whom had moved to flee Nazi oppression. To prevent retaliation against their relatives still living in Germany, many appeared in the film uncredited or under aliases. These actors were Hedwiga Reicher ('Celia Sibelius'), Wolfgang Zilzer ('John Voigt'), Rudolph Anders ('Robert Davis'), Wilhelm von Brincken ('William Vaughn'), and Martin Kosleck (uncredited).

== Based on a true story ==
Screenwriter John Wexley based his script on real events and the articles of former FBI agent Leon G. Turrou, who had been active in investigating Nazi spy rings in the United States prior to the war, quit the FBI and continued publishing articles on the topic that J. Edgar Hoover had largely ignored and tried to prevent from publication. Authors Paul Buhle and David Wagner of Radical Hollywood wrote that it "treated a real-life case" and that Warner Bros. had been warned by the Dies Committee "against slurring a 'friendly country'".

Parts of the movie were a fictionalized account of a real-life espionage case, the Rumrich Nazi Spy Case, and the eventual trial in 1938 involving individuals convicted of spying for German government. The FBI said the Rumrich Nazi Spy Case was their "first major international spy case" and that Leon Turrou "was placed in charge" but had later been fired by FBI chief Hoover. In fact, Turrou had first quit and been retroactively fired to strip him of benefits. Guenther Gustave Maria Rumrich was arrested on February 14, 1938, and charged with spying for Germany. He came to the FBI's attention when he attempted to obtain 50 passport application forms from the Passport Office in New York City. In the film, Francis Lederer, as Schneider, plays the role equivalent to the real Rumrich.

The scene where an unnamed American Legionaire played by Ward Bond challenges Kassel at a meeting, is supported by others speaking out for democracy, provoking an attack by Bundists, is based on an actual event that occurred in late April 1938 when approximately 30 World War I American Legion Veterans stood up to the Bund in New York City during a celebration of Hitler's birthday. The veterans were severely beaten and later Cecil Schubert, who suffered a fractured skull, was personally recognized for his bravery by Mayor La Guardia.

== Production ==
The Production Code Administration, led by Joseph Breen, first recommended shelving the film citing concerns about losing access to the German market and saying it unduly criticized a particular world leader (Hitler), but later acquiesced after alterations including removing any mention of Jewish people, Hitler's big lie. The PCA was heavily lobbied by the German government, particularly from their consulate in L.A., to prevent the release of anti-Nazi movies. After the release of the film, the PCA announced that they would not permit the release of any other anti-Nazi films. The studio and its personnel received hundreds of threatening letters in connection to the film, resulting in its doors being heavily guarded during filming. Jack Warner himself insisted on filming without interference, saying that "it is time America woke up to the fact that Nazi spies are operating within our borders. Our picture will tell the truth—all of it—and it will speak for itself this summer".

Many actors turned down roles out of fear of repercussions including violence, and nobody would play Hitler no matter the pay, so the script was altered so that he was only present in newsreel footage. A 60-pound boom had been sabotaged to fall down on the set, nearly killing one of the main actors. Actor Ferdinand Schumann-Heink recalled that most of the film's German cast members were known only by numbers in order to protect the relatives of theirs that were still living in Germany then.

== Release ==
The film was the first anti-Nazi film from a major American studio. At the premiere, there were almost as many policemen and special agents in the audience as customers. Wexley's script made a point of following the facts and real-life events of the Rumrich Nazi Spy Case whose participants went to trial in 1938. The film was re-released in 1940 with scenes describing events that had taken place since the initial release, such as the invasions of Norway and the Netherlands.

Pushback from Nazis and their local supporters saw theaters around the U.S. being picketed or vandalized, limiting the release. Fritz Kuhn, leader of the German American Bund, sued Warner Bros for $5 million, alleging that the film was libellous against him.

Confessions of a Nazi Spy was banned in Germany, Japan, and many Latin American and European countries. Norway also banned it in 1939. Adolf Hitler in particular banned all Warner Bros. productions from being shown in Nazi Germany as a result of the studio's work on the film. Warner Bros. was so surprised to hear that the British Board of Film Censors gave the film a U certificate that the studios telephoned the censors, asking them to confirm its passage for exhibition in the United Kingdom. The film remained banned in Germany for 32 years after the fall of the Nazis; in early 1977, after West Germany lifted its ban on "hard-core" anti-Nazi films, it was shown in West German cinemas as part of a series of such films that were made by Warner Bros. during World War II.

In the United States, it had a month-long rolling open.

Louis B. Mayer required all MGM employees to attend Lionel Barrymore's 61st birthday celebration, broadcast live on the NBC Red radio program Good News of 1939, in order to prevent their attendance of the premiere.

== Reception ==
Confessions of a Nazi Spy opened to mainly positive reviews. The review aggregator site Rotten Tomatoes gives the film a 92% approval rating based on 63 critics' reviews. It's consensus states: "Distinguished by its dogged adherence to the facts and Edward G. Robinson's forceful performance, Confessions of a Nazi Spy presents a tightly directed, intensely vivid cinematic document of wartime espionage in 1930s America."

Kate Cameron of the New York Daily News said that "Anatole Litvak has done a splendid job of creating suspense in building a case against the spies, but, I am grieved to say, he and the scenario writers have spoiled the effect of their big trial scene by permitting themselves to deliver a needless warning to the audience." Edwin Schallert of the Los Angeles Times noted that the film's premiere in Hollywood was marked by hisses and boos, and remarked that the film was "stunningly acted, the word being apt for the performances by Paul Lukas, Francis Lederer and George Sanders, who surpass themselves in their portrayals." Harry Mines of the Los Angeles Daily News wrote that "suffice to say Hitler, Goebbels, Goering and others of the party will not like 'Confessions of a Nazi Spy.' Warner Bros, however, may rest assured of having done a patriotic service to the American people in making such a picture possible. For after glimpsing this factual document exposing a terrifying espionage system and stealthy spread of alien propaganda in a peace loving nation, it teaches the thoughtful citizenry of the United States the necessity of awareness." A critic for The Boston Globe wrote that "the picture never grows [hysterical] or overly vehement in its treatment, which makes the indictment against German espionage all the more powerful. The menace of concentration camps, tortures and nameless horrors to be found back in Germany for faithless Nazi agents is depicted in shadowy, but terrifying fashion." Writing under the Mae Tinee pseudonym, a critic for the Chicago Daily Tribune described the film as "potent anti-Nazi propaganda that presents a powerful and impassioned plea for the defense of the principles that have made America "the land of the free." There are times when the action seems ineptly strung together. This fact is undoubtedly due to the producers' determination that they would stick to facts and indulge in no fictional fancy work. But you are never confused, for off-screen narration, concisely delivered, keeps the decks of meaning cleared." Lowell Lawrence of the Kansas City Journal said that the "Warner Brothers have done a courageous thing in presenting this dramatized evidence of a national peril to the American people. The German government may retaliate not only against the producers but against every player in the cast. But the time has passed when foreign governments can dictate to Hollywood. Warners answered Nazi threats by giving "Confessions of a Nazi Spy" the kind of a production that presents the picture's message in the most impressive manner."

John C. Moffitt of The Kansas City Star wrote that "the picture doesn't aim to be soothing syrup, It's the same type of crashdocumental dramatization that' ing, made "I Am a Fugitive" and "G-Men" gloriously inflammable stuff. You can't see it without hating injustice and oppression. Because truth is also more convincing than fiction, it has all the earlier Nazi stuff beat, including 'It Can't Happen Here.' There isn't a story of what might be done in America, but of what has already been done. The action is based upon the evidence brought forth at various recent spy trials in New York, Los Angeles and in the Panama Canal Zone. The dramatization consists of no more than linking a few central characters through the various case histories so that a continuous thread of narrative can be maintained. Directed with a smashing episodic, almost news-reel style, that adapts Itself well to current history, 'Confessions of a Nazi Spy,' contains performances so gripping and real as almost to make you hate the actors." Colvin MacPherson of the St. Louis Post-Dispatch praised "the picture's method, to the way in which it clarifies its material. More pictures of its manner of treatment are on their way, you may be sure. The day may even come when truth, fully documented and full protecting movie producers in the courts, will be more serviceable to the screen than Hollywood's hackneyed fiction." Ada Hanifin of the San Francisco Examiner said that "Warners, true to form, have made a virile account in celluloid of the subversive activities of foreigners, and Americans of one generation whose [egos] become inflated by the propaganda that is spread in secret meetings and 'literature.' What gives the play its accentuated credulity, apart from its source the book of former agent of the FBI, Leon G. Turrou is the acting of the Germans and German Americans who appear in support of the stars." Paul Speecle of the San Francisco Chronicle wrote, "that Warner Bros. has filmed Confessions of a Nazi Spy, the cinematic stick of blasting powder which opened yesterday at the Warfield Theater, without capitulating to a natural tendency toward overly dramatizing the facts makes that studio stand out as one of the most intelligent forces in the movie industry". Andrew R. Kelley of the Washington Times-Herald said that "against this factual background, Warner Brothers has managed to weave a melodramatic story becoming to be sure a little heated and biased-in sending home the lesson but-leaving the fixed impression that the dictators of Europe and especially Germany are zealous in circulating arguments against democracy and equally active in finding out what Uncle Sam is doing in the way of defense." A critic for The Washington Daily News said that "the picture is important because it is the first to bounce the dictators on a hard knee. It marks the end of Hollywood’s pussy-footing era."

Lionel Collier of the London Daily Herald called it "a definite indictment of German efforts not only to gain possession of Americas naval and military secrets, but also an expose of the efforts of German agents to whip up enthusiasm for the Nazi regime and enlist the sympathies of all German-born American citizens." S. Rossiter Shepherd of the Sunday People called the film "a definite and powerful attack on the Nazi regime; it is a picture which breaks new ground in film history; but with all its propaganda it is at the same time first-class entertainment of a very strong and unusual order." Moore Raymond of the Sunday Dispatch said that "this is a brilliantly made and brilliantly acted picture, and Edward G. Robinson is specially to be praised for the subdued, confident manner in which he plays the G-man." A reviewer for The Argus said that "As an indictment of the range of Nazi influence and activity in America, and as an ardent drumbeater for making everybody spy conscious, Warner Brothers' film, "Confessions of a Nazi Spy," could not have been more outspoken and courageous. The story is straight from newspaper records of the spy trials in the U.S.A. last year, and it is told with directness shorn of anything artificial and fanciful, so giving the film actual and credible substance." A reviewer for The Herald said "this imposing American film, direct in text, and logical in argument and conclusion, is more a verdict of American opinion than ail attempt at counter-propaganda." A reviewer for The Sun News-Pictorial said that "this forthright film, founded on fact, is a fine drama, ably acted, impressively pictured." A reviewer for The Age said that "as an exposition of Nazi espionage and propaganda methods In the United States of America. the film Is a scathing indictment of Nazi tyranny. As a screen drama, it is first-class entertainment, a mystery thriller, of high order. There is plenty of propaganda in the picture, but it is not a predominant feature. The play, with its quick action, adroitly woven plots and strong dramatic force, holds attention on its own: merits from the first scene to its exciting climax."

Praise for the film was not unanimous, however. Frank Nugent of The New York Times says that "Hitler's pledge of non-aggression toward the Americas reached the Warners too late yesterday. They had formally declared war on the Nazis at 8:15 A. M. with the first showing of their "Confessions of a Nazi Spy" at the Strand. Hitler won't like it; neither will Goebbels; frankly, we were not too favorably impressed either, although for a different reason. We can endure just so much hissing, even when Der Fuehrer and the Gestapo are its victims. The Warners had courage in making the picture, but we should have preferred to see them pitch their battle on a higher plane." Critic C.A. Lejeune of The Observer said "it is sad to report, after these dramatic preliminaries, that the film that the Warners have worked out with all this zeal and courage falls strictly into the beta class. It isn't, in fact, a very good picture." In a more mixed review, a critic for The Manchester Guardian said that it had "almost everything that was claimed for it: a strong, slick, vivid, unromanticised account of the discovery of that large German spy ring in the United States which recently caused so much uproar there. But the most interesting thing about it is not the merit or demerit of the film but the fact that it was ever made and, as a footnote, ever shown over here, where the official hand in dealing with the dictators still wears the glove of tactfulness. So far as First National, the producers of the film, are concerned it goes to show how a bold front goes a long way towards breaking down the prejudices of the Hays Office; as for the British end of the censorship, one can only ask why, if the British public may witness these 'Confessions,' it must be barred from 'Professor Mamlock,' that far finer film about Nazism; one can only suppose that the American origins of the one film and the Russian origins of the other would somehow be involved' in the explanations, if any were ever given."

It won the 1939 National Board of Review Award for Best Film. Scenes from Confessions of a Nazi Spy are shown in War Comes to America, the last of the Why We Fight propaganda film series, as well as the 2004 documentary film Imaginary Witness: Hollywood and the Holocaust. Rachel Maddow called the film one of the most important of the 20th century.

== See also ==
- 1939 Nazi rally at Madison Square Garden
- Duquesne Spy Ring – 1941 case
- Confusions of a Nutzy Spy
- You Nazty Spy!
- The Stranger (1946) – another film with an anti-Nazi theme also starring Edward G. Robinson
