= Craigie Burn =

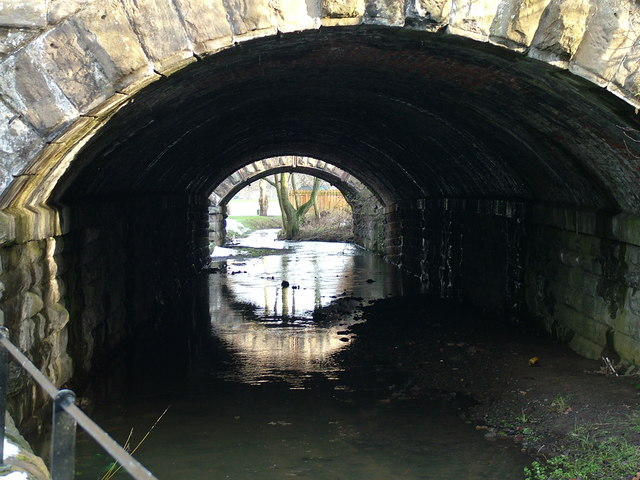
- Flowing beneath a viaduct near the South Inch

Physical characteristics
- Source
  - location: Perth, Perth and Kinross, Scotland
  - coordinates: 56.380905°N 3.458708°W
- Mouth
  - coordinates: 56.386327°N 3.426024°W
  - elevation: Sea level
- Length: ~2.25 mi
- Discharge
  - location: River Tay

Craigie Burn is a watercourse which flows through the southern suburbs of Perth, Scotland. It rises beside the M90 motorway and flows north through Moncreiffe and Buckie Braes, then east through Craigie, for around 2.25 miles (3.62 km). It empties into the River Tay just beyond the southeastern corner of the South Inch, after passing beneath Shore Road.

Between Queen's Street and Windsor Terrace are the Craigie Falls, the rare sight of a waterfall in an urban area. The water here was once used by a mill and a distillery.

The middle and lower sections of the burn were subject to significant floods. These occurred in 1981, 1990, 1993, 2002, 2012, 2020, 2022 and 2023. In 2023, changes were made to increase the capacity of culverts and improve river flow.

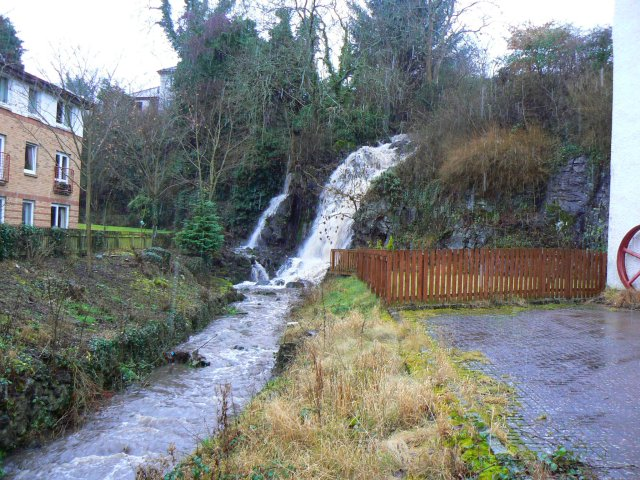
Craigie Falls
