= St Magdalene's Hill =

Hill near Perth, Scotland

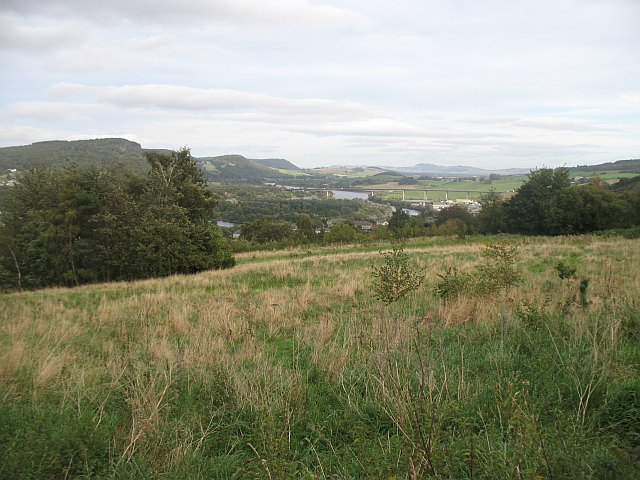
- Looking east from St Magdalene's Hill to Friarton Bridge and Kinnoull Hill

Highest point
- Elevation: 131 m (430 ft)
- Coordinates: 56°22′27″N 03°26′30″W

Geography
- Location: Perth, Perth and Kinross, Scotland

St Magdalene's Hill is a hill located 1.5 miles (2.4 km) south-southwest of Perth, Scotland, next to the M90 motorway. Its summit is at 131 metres (430 ft).

The hill (and woodland, which is shown on a 1783 military survey map) takes its name from St Mary Magdalene's hospital for the poor, which was located near the site.
