= Leon G. Turrou =

Federal Bureau of Investigation agent

Turrou in 1939

Leon George Turrou (September 14, 1895 – December 10, 1986) was an FBI Special Agent from 1929 to 1938. He was involved in several high-profile investigations including the USS Akron Airship disaster (1933), Lindbergh Baby Kidnapping (1932-34), and enforcement of the Mann Act (White Slave Traffic) (1936-37). In February 1938 Turrou was assigned by FBI Director J. Edgar Hoover to head a foreign espionage investigation, the Rumrich Nazi Spy Case. Turrou's surprise decision to resign from the FBI on June 20, 1938 and go public with details of the investigation in a series of newspaper articles made him the target of a 27-year vendetta by Hoover. However, Turrou's collaboration with the New York Post and Warner Brothers Pictures has been credited with alerting Americans to the Nazi threat, shifting public opinion against neutrality, and increasing the funding of counter espionage agencies prior to World War II. Attempts by the Department of Justice to prevent publication of his articles raised constitutional issues regarding prior restraint, secrecy of grand jury proceedings, whistle-blower rights, employee retribution, and the validity of non-disclosure agreements that anticipated “the landmark ruling in favor of the New York Times in the Pentagon Papers case of 1971.”

== Early life ==
Turrou was born Leon Turovsky on September 14, 1895, in Kobryn, Russia (later in Poland, now in Belarus). He claimed in a 1939 interview that both his French father and Russian mother had died by his first birthday. In reality, his mother, Rebecca Turovsky, age 41, and her other son, Rudolf (or “Randolph”) age 16, sailed from Singapore via Yokohama, Japan, arriving in Seattle, Washington on July 13, 1916. On the ship's manifest under nationality, “Russia” had been crossed out and replaced with “Hebrew” for both passengers. In 1920, while enlisted in the US Marine Corps, Leon listed “Mrs. Rebecca Turovsky” as his mother and person to be notified in case of emergency.

Turrou's descendants believe that the open antisemitism of the era may have persuaded him to deny his Jewish heritage. Turrou did have a clear motive to do so because his marriage in 1917 to Teresa, a Catholic, would have required a dispensation, difficult or even impossible to obtain under existing Church canon matrimonial law.

However, Jewish heritage may not have been an issue in the FBI. Hoover, a Freemason and Presbyterian, had Jewish agents. Harold Nathan, born of a Jewish family in New York, was highly respected by Hoover. In May 1925, he promoted Nathan to Assistant Bureau Director, “charged with supervising all personnel matters, coordinating investigations, and running the Bureau in Hoover's absence.”

Turrou became a target of antisemitism only after his resignation from the FBI. Ignatz Griebl, one of the Nazi spies indicted in the 1938 trial, attacked Turrou's veracity because he looked Jewish. In his 1939 book “The Nazi Spy Conspiracy in America”, Turrou observed wryly: “As for Griebl's recognition of me as a Jew ‘by facial landmarks,’ I have a Slavic cast of countenance, and just to keep the record clear, I happen not to be a Jew, either by birth or faith.”

Turovsky traveled widely in his youth, becoming fluent in French, German, Russian, Polish, Ukrainian, Malay and English. He arrived in New York City on March 12, 1913, sailing on the SS Bremen from Germany, and found work selling papers and doing odd jobs. He claimed that during the World War he joined a Polish unit of the French Foreign Legion and was wounded. But a search by the FBI in 1938 could find no record of his wartime service. Later he worked for the Chinese Eastern Railway and in 1917 married Teresa Zakrzewski, a Polish woman, in Vladivostok, Russia. They had two sons, Edward and Victor, both born in Tayga, Siberia. During the chaos of the Russian Civil War, Turovsky and his family became separated. Unable to confirm his family's fate, Turovsky returned to America and in 1920 enlisted in the U.S. Marine Corps.

On February 7, 1921 Turovsky became an American citizen under provisions of the 1918 Alien Naturalization Act, which allowed any alien who had served honorably in the U.S. military to petition for citizenship. At this time, he also changed his name to Turrou. On February 12, 1921, Turrou applied to the Bureau of Investigation, Department of Justice, as an interpreter. Captain Lemuel C. Shepherd, Turrou's Marine Corps commander, wrote a letter of recommendation extolling Private Turrou's six months with the France Map Detachment, where he was of “inestimable service as an interpreter”. (General Shepherd was Commandant of the Marine Corps from 1953 to 1956). J. Edgar Hoover, then Special Assistant to the Attorney General, personally interviewed Turrou, and strongly recommended to Bureau of Investigation Chief Lewis J. Baley that he be hired “for the use in translating and investigations into radical matters.” However, no appointments were available. After a medical discharge from the Marines on May 3, 1921, Turrou successfully applied to Herbert Hoover’s American Relief Administration (ARA) as a translator. This was during the Russian famine of 1921–1922. He worked in Soviet Russia from September 1921 to February 1923, primarily as an interpreter for Chief of Mission William N. Haskell. He participated in meetings with senior Soviet officials. Turrou's own account (“An Unwritten Chapter”) of his work for Haskell highlights a fraught negotiation with Felix Dzerzhinsky (head of the Cheka and Transport Commissariat) over delays in food distribution. In May 1922, he was reunited with his wife and children in Moscow. Turrou resigned from the ARA and brought his family to America, settling in Westbury, New York. In August 1923 another application to the Bureau was rejected, this time for lacking a law degree. In 1926 he applied to the Department of Justice, and was told that no positions were available. In this period, he was employed as a salesman at the Macy department store in New York City and a clerk in the U.S. General Post Office.

== FBI Career ==
On December 2, 1928 Turrou again applied to the Bureau. During the 1928 presidential campaign, Turrou had canvassed for Herbert Hoover in New York City's Russian immigrant neighborhoods, earning him endorsements from several prominent Republican politicians. Although an investigation involving interviews with those knowledgeable of Turrou concluded he was of good character, he was found not qualified because he still lacked a law degree (L.L.B.). J. Edgar Hoover rejected Turrou's application on December 29, 1928. Nevertheless, on February 2, 1929, Assistant to the Attorney General William J. Donovan forwarded several letters to Hoover again urging Turrou's appointment. Donovan had expected to be nominated Attorney General by the President Elect, but was passed over on February 27. He resigned shortly thereafter. Herbert Hoover was inaugurated President on March 4, 1929. Conveniently, the law degree requirement was waived and J. Edgar Hoover appointed Turrou a Special Agent on March 7, 1929. On April 1, 1929 he swore his oath of allegiance to the United States and began his career as a Special Agent. Originally assigned to the Chicago office, he was transferred to New York in 1930. Turrou earned commendations for his diligent and effective performance. His language skills were assets in several investigations. In a November 6, 1935 efficiency report reviewed by Clyde Tolson, the rater noted that Turrou had “an uncanny knack of securing information.” On November 19 Hoover promoted Turrou from Special Agent, Caf 10, at $3700 per annum to Caf 11 (the highest Special Agent grade) at $3800 per annum.

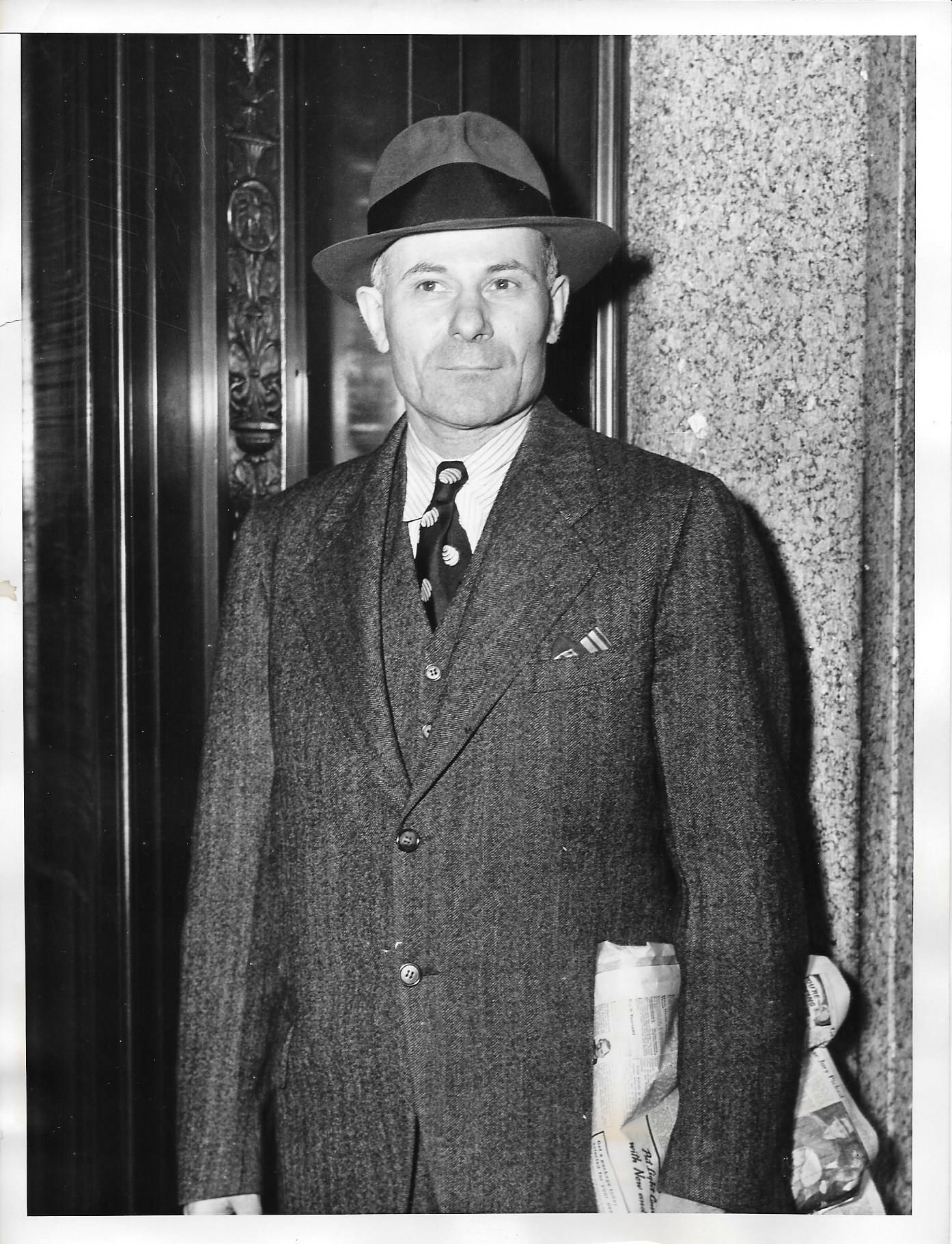
FBI Special Agent Leon Turrou during Nazi Spy Case, October 1938

== The Rumrich Nazi Spy Case ==
On January 29, 1938, MI5 (the British domestic counter-intelligence service) shared with the U.S. Military Attaché in London the contents of a letter sent from New York to Dundee, Scotland. The recipient, Jessie Jordan, a hairdresser, was already under surveillance and known to be a “post box” for the Abwehr, German Military Intelligence. The sender, a German agent code-named Crown, described a plot to abduct and possibly murder a U.S. Army officer in New York. This tip brought the FBI into discussions with the State and War Departments over who should investigate, as the U.S. did not have a counter-intelligence service. Director Hoover was reluctant to accept the case because of possible conflicts with the other agencies, and his own unfamiliarity with espionage, but was persuaded to do so. Hoover assigned Turrou, who was now earning $4600 per annum, as lead investigator. He had little to go on until an Army deserter, Guenther Rumrich, was arrested by the New York Police on February 15 while attempting to obtain blank passport applications under an assumed name. Evidence found in his apartment by Army investigators suggested Rumrich might be a foreign agent. The NYPD, State Department and Army were all involved with Rumrich before Turrou learned about the case from newspaper accounts on February 17.

On February 19, Rumrich was transferred to FBI custody, and interrogated by Turrou. Rumrich quickly confessed to being Crown and began cooperating, naming other members of a spy ring run by the Abwehr. Turrou followed his leads and quickly obtained confessions from more spies. Turrou had the gift of making people talk. Particularly helpful was Dr. Ignatz T. Griebl, an outspoken local Nazi leader, Army Reserve officer, and obstetrician-gynecologist. Griebl revealed details of an espionage network that was providing Germany with vital U.S. military secrets. Korvettenkapitän Erich Pfeiffer, a German naval officer stationed in Bremen, was identified as responsible for the Abwehr's American operations. On February 27, Hoover and Reed Vetterli, Special Agent in Charge of the FBI's New York office, briefed reporters on details of the investigation. They named Rumrich and two other suspects under arrest, Erich Glaser and Johanna Hofmann. Photographs of Rumrich and Hofmann were published in the New York Times report on the FBI briefings. More arrests were expected. A “reliable source” (presumably Hoover himself) disparaged the spy ring as naïve and obtuse. “None of this information would be of value to Germany with one possible exception, the secret codes of the Air Service.” These revelations had consequences. “To Turrou's dismay, German intelligence diverted ships carrying spies, destroyed evidence and told its agents to run for cover.”

In May 1938 the sudden disappearances of two material witnesses put Hoover at odds with Lamar Hardy, the U.S. Attorney for the Southern District of New York. Dr. Griebl and Werner G. Gudenberg had fled the country as stowaways aboard German ocean liners. Both had been cooperating with the investigation and neither Turrou nor Hardy considered them to be flight risks as they could expect harsh treatment if they returned to Germany. On June 1, 1938 Hoover publicly blamed Hardy for their escape. Hardy indignantly denied any responsibility. Turrou suspected the men had been abducted by Gestapo agents to prevent them from testifying at the coming trial. But Hardy felt he could still get indictments from the grand jury and prevail in the trial with Turrou's testimony.

On June 20, 1938 the grand jury returned 18 indictments for espionage. In addition to the 4 in Federal custody (Rumrich, Hofmann, Erich Glaser and Otto Herman Voss) were 12 others outside U.S. jurisdiction. These included Jordan, already serving a four-year sentence in Scotland, Griebl and Gudenberg (who had escaped to Germany), Pfeiffer and 8 other German agents and military officers. Two of the indicted later proved to be fictitious. As only four defendants would ever stand trial in America, the action of the grand jury appeared to be mainly a moral indictment of the German Government. Nevertheless, all the indictments remained active until March 20, 1950 when a nolle prosequi (decision to abandon the prosecution) was filed in the U.S. District Court for the Southern District of New York. Minutes after release of the indictments Turrou resigned from the FBI, effective immediately. He cited ill-health and his desire to warn Americans about the Nazi espionage threat. Almost simultaneously, the New York Post announced it would soon publish a series of articles by Turrou about the spy investigation. This prompted a conference with Hardy. Afterwards he felt sure that Turrou would not divulge anything of a confidential nature. Turrou concurred, saying his stories would “dramatize” material as the inquiry moved along. There was an amicable farewell, with Hardy praising Turrou's services. The FBI cited an “oath” taken by agents never to divulge the nature of a case, but admitted that it was unenforceable after an agent resigns.

On June 22, the New York Post carried a front-page banner headline that Turrou's series would begin the next day. Inside, a two-page spread trumpeted sensational details: Starts tomorrow in the New York Post, Ace G-man Bares German Conspiracy to Paralyze United States! Authentic Inside Story Behind U. S. Grand Jury Indictments of 14 German Officials! Revealed by Leon G. Turrou. The Man Who Cracked the Spy Ring Reveals How Nazi Spies and Traitors Sold Out the United States Army and Navy! . . . You will be horrified at this sordid episode in these amazing revelations of contemptible peacetime spy activities against a supposedly friendly nation! Hardy, with the approval of Attorney General Homer Cummings, immediately sought and obtained a temporary injunction against publication.

On June 23, lawyers for the Post, Turrou and Hardy appeared in Federal district court for a show cause hearing. The Government argued that Turrou's revelations threatened to undermine the work of the grand jury and overshadow the case. Further, that Turrou's resignation was not effective until September 20 and he would be in contempt of court if the articles were printed. Turrou claimed his resignation had been effective immediately and that he had willingly waived his future rights including pay for three month's leave due him. The Post claimed freedom of the press, and Turrou's lawyer, Simon Rifkind, argued that there was no precedent for prior restraint of a newspaper. “To reinforce the point, Rifkind handed the judge a sheaf of articles Hoover had written in The American Magazine.” Even more to the point, in February 1938 Hoover had published Persons in Hiding, a true-crime book based on major FBI cases, including Bonny and Clyde, and Machine Gun Kelly. It was reviewed in the NYT on February 13, 1938 with the lead, “It is time Mr. Hoover gave his ghost some fresh material.” On May 13, 1938, Paramount Pictures announced acquisition of Hoover's book. The movie was released on February 10, 1939.

At a press conference on June 24 President Franklin D. Roosevelt was asked about the controversy. He favored larger appropriations for the Army and Navy intelligence services for the expansion of counter-espionage activities in America. However, he questioned the ethics and patriotism of “the former FBI agent” and the newspaper publisher involved. The Post responded the same day by postponing Turrou's series until after the trial “to avoid setting a precedent which might handicap the government in guarding itself against other spy activities.” President Roosevelt promptly sent a telegram to J. David Stern, the publisher: “Very glad to hear of your decision.” Back in court on June 28, the parties agreed to a stipulation that the Post would not begin publishing Turrou's articles until the completion of the grand jury investigation and the subsequent trial. In a lengthy memorandum to Attorney General Cummings dated July 5, Hoover related that Special Agent Vetterli claimed he was present, on or about May 12, when Stern offered Turrou $20,000 for the articles.

On June 30 the FBI announced that Turrou's resignation on June 20th was rejected and that he was dismissed with prejudice, forfeiting all pay and benefits for violating his oath by disclosing information received by him in his official capacity. Turrou responded by denying that he had ever taken an oath of secrecy, and observed that Hoover was merely jealous and resented being scooped. Turrou had in fact signed such an agreement on November 13, 1935. This “oath” was a confidentiality agreement required as a condition of continued employment. It applied during tenure and at “any other time”. This arguably infringed on Turrou's freedom of speech as a private citizen. Turrou cited numerous instances of how Hoover himself had personally profited from his articles, films and books based on FBI case files.

Despite their differences, Hardy relied on Turrou's testimony during the trial. It began on October 14, 1938 with the four defendants in custody: Rumrich, 27, a US citizen born in Chicago, but raised in Germany and Austria; Hofmann, 27, German, a former hairdresser on the North German Lloyd liner Europa; Voss, 39, a naturalized US citizen and airplane mechanic; and Glaser, 28, German, former soldier in the US Army Air Corps. Turrou was attacked by the defense for allegedly fabricating evidence, taking bribes and personal failings. Hoover's denunciations were cited as evidence of Turrou's dishonesty. George C. Dix, attorney for defendant Johanna Hofmann, called Major General William N. Haskell, Commander of the New York National Guard, as a character witness against Turrou. But Haskell testified that during his time in the ARA he never questioned Turrou's loyalty and had even given him a very positive letter of recommendation upon his departure. Rumrich, in return for a plea deal, was Hardy's chief witness. The trial ended on December 1, 1938, with Rumrich's guilty plea, and three convictions on the charge of conspiracy to transmit information relating to the national defense to a foreign power. Rumrich was sentenced to 2 years; Hofmann, 4 years; Voss, 6 years; and Glaser, 2 years.

In concluding remarks, Federal Judge John C. Knox said: “The proceeding in this quiet courtroom contrasted with the grim order for decapitations that would have resulted for like offenses in Germany ... Within this court room three natives of a totalitarian state have been the recipients of the mercies of a democracy. The quantity and quality of these mercies is not yet exhausted. Someday Voss and Glaser will be willing to concede they were fortunate to be before the court of democracy instead of a totalitarian tribunal. In this country we spread no sawdust upon the surfaces of our prison yards.”

The next day, December 2, Turrou signed with Warner Brothers Pictures to work as technical advisor on a movie adaptation of the case, Confessions of a Nazi Spy. In October, Jack Warner had sent studio writer Milton Kribs to New York to cover the trial with an eye to turning it into a screen play, initially titled Storm Over America. On December 5th the Post began publishing Turrou's 25 articles, continuing until January 4, 1939. Turrou's book version of the Post series, Nazi Spies in America was published by Random House on January 27, 1939. The film's script closely followed the book and the actors were committed anti-fascists. Turrou was portrayed by Edward G. Robinson as Edward Renard; Ignatz Griebel by Paul Lukas as Dr. Karl Kassel; Guenther Rumrich by Francis Lederer as Kurt Schneider; and Lamar Hardy by Henry O'Neill as US Attorney Kellog. It premiered on April 15, 1939, despite fierce opposition by German officials and Hollywood's Production Code Administration (Hays Code) censors. PCA official Karl Lischka complained in January 1939, “To represent Hitler only as a screaming madman and a bloodthirsty prosecutor, and nothing else, is manifestly unfair, considering his phenomenal public career, his unchallenged political and social achievements and his position as head of the most important continental European power.” That July on vacation in Paris, Turrou was interviewed by Ce Soir about his career as “G-man Number 1”, and took the opportunity to promote Confessions before its premiere in France. By August 1939 the film was prohibited in Germany, Italy, Norway, Sweden, Japan and Holland. It was re-released in mid-1940 with scenes describing events that had taken place since the initial release, including the invasions of Poland, Denmark, Norway, the Low Countries, and France. The end credits acknowledge the film was based on the articles of Leon G. Turrou. Confessions did make its way into Germany for a select audience. After the war, under interrogation by the British, Erich Pfeiffer revealed that he and his colleagues enjoyed frequent showings in the Wehrmacht’s command bunkers at Zossen, 20 miles south of Berlin.

Following his sojourn in Hollywood, Turrou became popular on the lecture circuit and gave interviews on the radio. His attitude toward Hoover had changed, at every opportunity he now praised Hoover and the FBI. This began a long campaign to have the “with prejudice” stain removed from his official record. Hoover, however, was intent on burying Turrou, destroying his reputation and blocking his attempts to find employment with other Government agencies. In 1941 Hoover used his influence to have Turrou's job applications to Army and Naval Intelligence rejected. He wrote personally to William J. Donovan, now Coordinator of Intelligence, asserting that Turrou was “absolutely and completely untrustworthy”.

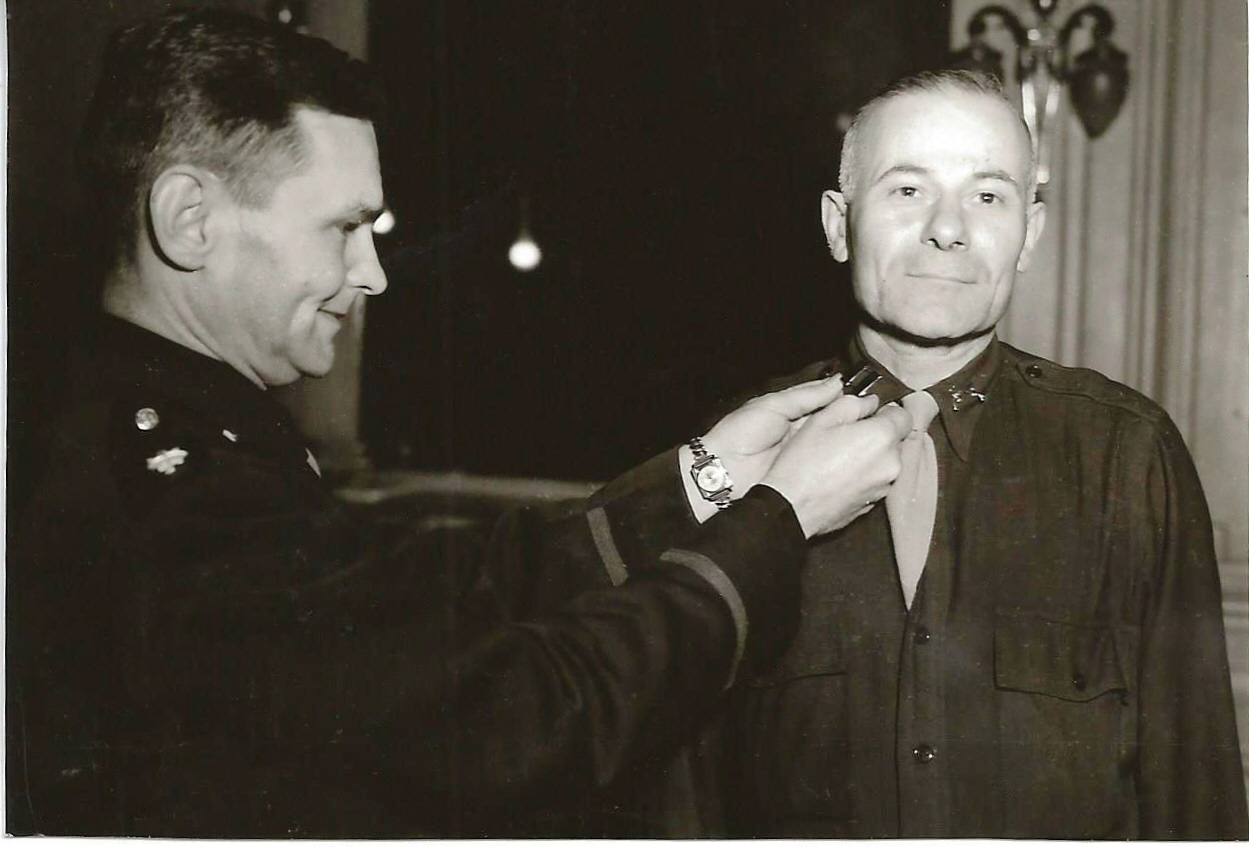
Melvin Purvis pins captain bars on Leon Turrou, circa January 1944

== Later Life ==
Teresa died on May 1, 1942. With both his sons already serving in the Army, Turrou enlisted as a private soldier in April 1943. He was 47. A 1942 provision had raised the enlistment age of men with special skills from 45 to 50. During military police training at Fort Custer, Michigan, Turrou met with Melvin Purvis, an old FBI friend who had also earned Hoover's ire by resigning from the FBI in 1935 to capitalize on his fame as the man who caught John Dillinger. Now a Lt. Colonel in the Military Police Corps, Purvis persuaded Turrou to apply for a commission. A report of this was sent to Hoover who wrote in the margin: “We no longer need proof of where Purvis stands.” Turrou's application was accepted and soon after he was assigned to head a special Criminal Investigation Division (CID) group in North Africa combatting rampant black-market activities.

In August 1943 Turrou learned that his son Victor was missing in action while on a bombing mission over Italy. In January 1944, Turrou and his son Edward were granted leave to find Victor. They learned from the sole survivor who had escaped from a German POW camp that the B-24 had been shot down near Potenza, Italy. They eventually located Victor's remains in a common grave with other crew members. Victor is buried at Sicily-Rome American Cemetery and Memorial, Nettuno, Italy, Plot J, Row 2, Grave 62.

In early January 1944, CPT Turrou and LTC Purvis were sent to Sicily by Lieutenant General Walter Bedell Smith, to investigate charges of inefficiency and malfeasance against Colonel Charles Poletti, Allied Military Government representative and so-called governor general of occupied Sicily. They found nothing to substantiate the charges. However, they did draw conclusions about Lieutenant General George S. Patton. They had been ordered to report to Patton, commander of American forces in Sicily, to enlist his cooperation. In Turrou's account, Patton believed they had been sent to investigate him, still sidelined in Sicily over the slapping incident. Turrou and Purvis assured him otherwise, but Patton, at times emotionally, told them his side of the story. It was convincing. “We came to believe that the only crime he had committed was that of being too much of a soldier.” They felt compelled to submit a subsidiary report on Patton, insisting that “Patton's immobilization was an injustice to him as well as the war effort.” As it turned out, Patton needn’t have worried. On January 26, 1944 he was ordered to Britain to command the new U.S. Third Army.

On December 12, 1944 Turrou was assigned by Lieutenant General Walter Bedell Smith to direct operations of the newly formed Central Registry of War Criminals and Security Suspects (CROWCASS). Based in Paris CROWCASS workers (French, mostly young girls) used IBM punch card computers to create a database of German POWs correlated to war crimes.

On May 24, 1945, Turrou married Anna B. McLester in Tucson, Arizona. They had no children.

Turrou was released from active duty on June 23, 1949 with the rank of Major. His Army decorations and citations included: European-African-Middle Eastern (EAME) Campaign Medal, Bronze Star Medal, Merit Unit Patch, Croix de Guerre with palm, French Légion d'honneur, Army Commendation Ribbon, Occupation Medal (Germany), WWII Victory medal, and 6 Overseas Bars. Turrou continued serving in the Army Reserve and retired as a Lieutenant Colonel (O5).

Now a civilian, Turrou settled in Paris with Anna. In 1949 he published a memoir, "Where My Shadow Falls-Two Decades of Crime Detection". In Paris, he served as Commander of Veterans of Foreign Wars Post 605, and President of the Inter-Allied Federation of Reserve Officers. Turrou also worked as a private investigator. In 1952, Turrou “ran into” oil billionaire J. Paul Getty at the Monte Carlo casino. They became friends and Turrou was hired as Getty's security advisor or “body guard”. All this time Hoover kept Turrou's file open, collecting derogatory information, and defaming Turrou when asked for employment references. Turrou's repeated requests for reconsidering the nature of his termination were left unanswered and filed away with Hoover's handwritten refusals. In 1958 Turrou praised Hoover and defended him against all accusations in an interview with a New York Post correspondent. A transcript prepared by Turrou was forwarded to the FBI by the American Embassy in Paris. In 1963, Helen Gandy, Hoover's longtime secretary, did respond politely to one of Turrou's entreaties, promising to bring it to Hoover's attention. Finally, Hoover relented and on June 1, 1965, he wrote a brief letter to Turrou, stating that he was removing “the prejudicial aspect of your dismissal.”

Turrou served as Vice Commander of American Legion Post 1, Paris, from 1970 to 1972. In a speech at the National Convention of the Veterans of Foreign Wars in Los Angeles on August 20, 1975, Lieutenant General Vernon A. Walters, deputy director of the CIA, acknowledged Turrou: “My pleasure at being here today is increased by seeing sitting here Leon Turrou, who is the commander of the Paris Post, as you know, and probably does more to project a favorable image of the United States than anybody else I know, official or private.”

In 1976, perhaps in empathy with another family's search for their soldier missing in action, Turrou volunteered as a translator in meetings in Paris between Vietnamese officials and a private group of Americans, in a fruitless attempt to ascertain the fate of USAF pilot Capt. Robert L. Tucci, who was shot down over Laos in 1969. Sessions were conducted in French. Between 1999 and 2009, U.S. investigative teams recovered aircraft wreckage, human remains, crew-related equipment, and personal effects from the crash site in Laos, and were able to identify the remains of Tucci among those recovered. Major Tucci's remains were returned to his family in 2011. He is buried at Dallas-Fort Worth National Cemetery, Section 76 Site 1658T.

Turrou died on December 10, 1986, at the age of 91. He is buried on the outskirts of Paris at the American Legion Memorial/Mausoleum, Neuilly-sur-Seine New Communal Cemetery, Rue de Vimy, Hauts-de-Seine, France.

== Sources ==
Ce Soir, Paris, France, July 2, 1939, Léon Turrou: G-Man No. 1, page 1

CIA, FOIA Reading Room, Leon Turrou searches, https://www.cia.gov/readingroom/

FBI, Federal Bureau of Investigation, Freedom of Information/Privacy Acts (FOIPA) Request No. 1366027-000, Subject: Turrou, Leon George (1920-1986), 1,839 pages in 6 sections, Washington, DC, March 13, 2017.

Gage, Beverly, G-Man: J. Edgar Hoover and the Making of the American Century, Viking, 2022

Getty, J. Paul, As I See It: The Autobiography of J. Paul Getty, revised edition, J. Paul Getty Trust; 2003, first published in the United States by Prentice-Hall in 1976.

Jeffreys-Jones, Rhodri, Jessie Jordan: A Rejected Scot who Spied for Germany and Hastened America's Flight from Neutrality, The Historian, Volume 76, Issue 4, Winter 2014, Pages: 766–783, published quarterly by Blackwell Publishing on behalf of the history honor society, Phi Alpha Theta.

Jeffreys-Jones, Rhodri, The Nazi Spy Ring in America: Hitler's Agents, the FBI, and the Case That Stirred the Nation, Georgetown University Press, Washington, DC, 2020.

Patenaude, Bertrand M., The Big Show in Bololand-The American Relief Expedition to Soviet Russia in the Famine of 1921, Stanford University Press, Stanford CA, 2002.

Ross, Steven J., Warners’ War: Confessions of a Nazi Spy: Warner Bros., Anti-Fascism and the Politicization of Hollywood, 2003, The Norman Lear Center, USC Annenberg School for Communication and Journalism, Los Angeles, CA. https://archive.learcenter.org/pdf/WWRoss.pdf

Rumrich Nazi Spy Case, History, Famous Cases and Criminals, https://www.fbi.gov/history/famous-cases/rumrich-nazi-spy-case

New York Post, June 22, 1938, Ace G-Man Bares German Conspiracy to Paralyze United States!

New York Times, February 27, 1938, Leader Confesses.

New York Times, June 2, 1938, Hoover and Hardy Clash on Spy Case.

New York Times, June 21, 1938, Text of the Federal Grand Jury's Indictments of 18 Persons as German Spies.

New York Times, June 22, 1938, Espionage Charge Resented by Reich ... Turrou Quits Inquiry.

The Federal Bureau of Investigation: History, Powers, and Controversies of the FBI, ABC-CLIO, 2022.

Turrou, Leon G., Nazi Spies in America-as told to David G. Wittels, New York, Random House, 1939; republished as Spying in America-Leon G. Turrou's the Nazi Spy Conspiracy in America, introduced and edited by Paul Rich, Westphalia Press, 2013.

Turrou, Leon G., Where My Shadow Falls-Two Decades of Crime Detection, Garden City, NY, Double Day & Co., 1949.

Military Record and Report of Separation, Certificate of Service, WD AGO Form 53-98, 23 June 1949,Turrou, Leon G.

HQ US Army Report of Casualty, 11 Oct 1988,Turrou, Leon G.

U.S. District Court for the Southern District of New York, Court Docket Number C102-462, The United States versus Carl Schluter, Johanna Hofmann, Guenther Gustave Rumrich, Erich Glaser et al., June 20, 1938 - March 20, 1950, filed at the National Archives, 1 Bowling Green, New York City, NY.
