= Rhodri Jeffreys-Jones =

American academic (born 1942)

Rhodri Jeffreys-Jones (born 28 July 1942) is professor of American history emeritus and an honorary fellow in History at the University of Edinburgh (School of History, Classics and Archaeology), Scotland. He is an authority on American intelligence history, having written two American intelligence history surveys and studies of the CIA and FBI. He has also written books on women and American foreign policy, America and the Vietnam War, and American labor history.

== Biography ==
Jeffreys-Jones was born in Carmarthen and grew up speaking Welsh in Harlech. Having moved to Harlech at a young age, he attended Ysgol Ardudwy, the local comprehensive school. He attended the University College of Wales at Aberystwyth (now Aberystwyth University), taking a B.A. in 1963. During 1964-65 he pursued graduate study at the University of Michigan and, during 1965–66, at Harvard University. In 1967 Jeffreys-Jones took his PhD in American history at Cambridge University in England. He stated in 2020:

I originally approached American history after following a left wing trajectory that billed the United States as arch-conservative, arch-capitalist, and hostile to democratic socialism and world peace.

He taught as a tutor of history at Harvard's Kirkland House, at Fitzwilliam College, Cambridge University, and for the Transport and General Workers Union before becoming a lecturer in history at the University of Edinburgh in 1967. After rising through the academic ranks as a lecturer and reader, in 1997 he became the university's second professor of American history, or its first exclusive professor of American history, given that in 1965 George "Sam" Shepperson had become "Professor of Commonwealth and American History." During his career, Jeffreys-Jones held visiting appointments, including: a Postdoctoral Fellowship at the Charles Warren Center for the Study of American History at Harvard (1971–72); a Stipendiary at the JFK Institut für Nordamerikastudien, Berlin, Germany; and a Canadian Commonwealth Fellowship and visiting professorship at the University of Toronto. Jeffreys-Jones has directed postgraduate students, master's and doctoral. Jeffreys-Jones was one of the founders of the Scottish Association for the Study of America.

== Research and publications ==
Jeffreys-Jones began his scholarly pursuits examining the issue of violence in American industry during the Progressive Era, including the use of private detective agencies in labor disputes. Building on his work involving private detectives who collected intelligence for big business, Jeffreys-Jones then shifted his focus during the late 1970s to examine American secret intelligence, a time when the field began to blossom with the release of historical records and revelations of American intelligence agencies' activities. Jeffreys-Jones published an historical survey examining the development of American intelligence from the establishment of the Secret Service in the 19th century to the CIA in the 20th. This was followed by one of the first academic histories of the CIA at a time when most studies were undocumented, a book examining American intelligence and exaggeration, and a history of the FBI in which Jeffreys-Jones traced its origins to the 19th century and the federal government's pursuit of the Ku Klux Klan.

More recent books by Jeffreys-Jones traced the history of British-American intelligence cooperation and the recent rise of European Union intelligence, and analyzed the achievements of the American left since 1900. The latter book was the winner of the Neustadt Prize for the best British book on American politics published in 2013. His next two books were about the history of surveillance in the US and the UK, and about the 1938 Nazi spy ring in America. A further recent work, A Question of Standing, brings the history of the CIA up to 2022, making a case for the importance of analysts. According to Lawrence D. Freedman in "Foreign Affairs" (November/December 2022), the book "provides a concise, informed, and thoughtful history of the agency." He has recently updated his history of the FBI in a Turkish edition, and published a book on Allan Pinkerton and his legacy.

== Published works ==
=== Books ===
- American Espionage: From Secret Service to CIA (New York: Free Press, 1977)
- Violence and Reform in American History (New York: New Viewpoints, 1978)
- The CIA and American Democracy (New Haven: Yale University Press, 1989)
- Changing Differences: Women and the Shaping of American Foreign Policy, 1917-1994 (New Brunswick: Rutgers University Press, 1995)
- Peace Now! American Society and the Ending of the Vietnam War (New Haven: Yale University Press, 1999)
- Cloak and Dollar: A History of American Secret Intelligence (New Haven: Yale University Press, 2002)
- The FBI: A History (New Haven: Yale University Press, 2007)
- In Spies We Trust: The Story of Western Intelligence (Oxford: Oxford University Press, 2013)
- The American Left: Its Impact on Politics and Society since 1900 (Edinburgh: Edinburgh University Press, 2013)
- We Know All About You: The Story of Surveillance in Britain and America (Oxford: Oxford University Press, 2017)
- Ring of Spies: How MI5 and the FBI Brought Down the Nazis in America (Cheltenham: The History Press, 2020)
- The Nazi Spy Ring in America: Hitler’s Agents, the FBI, and the Case that Stirred a Nation (Washington, D.C.: Georgetown University Press, 2020)
- A Question of Standing: The History of the CIA (Oxford: Oxford University Press, 2022)
- FBI Tarihi, 1908-2023: Kuruluşundan Günümüze (Istanbul: Kronik, 2025). https://kronikkitap.com/kitap/fbi-tarihi-1908-2023/
- Allan Pinkerton: America's Legendary Detective and the Birth of Private Security (Washington, D.C.: Georgetown University Press, 2025. https://press.georgetown.edu/Book/Allan-Pinkerton

=== Books (edited) ===
- Eagle Against Empire: American Opposition to European Imperialism, 1914-1982 (Aix-en-Provence: Publications Université de Provence for European Association for American Studies, 1983)
- With Bruce Collins, The Growth of Federal Power in American History. (DeKalb: Northern Illinois University Press, 1983)
- With Andrew Lownie, North American Spies: New Revisionist Essays (Edinburgh University Press, University of Kansas Press, 1991; London: Lume, 2021)
- With Christopher Andrew, Eternal Vigilance? 50 Years of the CIA (London and Portland, OR: Frank Cass, 1997)
- With David Stafford, American-British-Canadian Intelligence Relations, 1939-2000 (London and Portland, OR: Frank Cass, 2000)

=== Book contributions ===
- "What Burleson and Orwell Overlooked: Private Security Provision in the United States and the United Kingdom." In: Private Security and Modern States: Historical and Comparative Perspectives, edited by David Churchill, Dolores Janiewski and Pieter Leloup (London: Routledge, 2020), pp. 214–31.
- “J. Edgar Hoover.” In: The Federal Bureau of Investigation: History, Powers, and Controversies of the FBI, edited by Douglas M. Charles (Santa Barbara, CA: ABC-CLIO, 2022), pp. 221–28.
- "Of Politics and Intelligence: The FBI since 9/11," in Loch Johnson, ed., The Oxford Handbook of National Security Intelligence, 2nd. ed. (New York: Oxford University Press, 2026), pp. 135-48.

=== Articles (since 2015) ===
- "The Death of a Myth: How Socialism and the Left Succeeded in America." Reviews in American History, vol. 43 (June 2015), pp. 281–87.
- "Inter-Allied Commando Intelligence and Security Training in Gwynedd: The Coates Memoir," Intelligence and National Security, vol. 30, no. 4 (August 2015), pp. 545–59.
- "State Surveillance is More Ethical than Private-Sector Intrusions," Wired (January/February 2016), p. 97.
- "Antecedents and Memory as Factors in the Creation of the CIA," Diplomatic History, vol. 40, no. 1 (January 2016), pp. 140–54.
- "A Brief History of the FBI’s Meddling in US Politics." Vox (November 5, 2016)
- "Verraden." Geschiedenis Magazine (January/February 2017), pp. 45–49.
- "Hector Davis: A Liberal at War." History, vol. 102, no. 350 (April 2017), pp. 242–58.
- "Forcing Out Unwanted FBI Directors: A Brief, Messy History." Vox (May 23, 2017)
- "The Sensitivity of SIGINT: Sir Alfred Ewing's Lecture on Room 40 in 1927." Journal of Intelligence History, vol. 17, no. 1 (2018). pp. 18–29.
- "American Espionage: Lessons from the Past." Brown Journal of World Affairs, vol. 26, no. 1 (Fall/Winter 2019), pp. 93–106.
- "Learning the Scholar's Craft: A Journey with Enid Jones, John Hope Franklin, Sir Denis Brogan, Sidney Fine, and Oscar Handlin." H-DIPLO, Essay 221 (April 29, 2020)
- "Nazispionnen in Washington, 1937." Geschiedenis Magazine, vol. 55, no. 5 (July/August 2020), pp. 20–24.
- "Leon Turrou and the Nazi Spy Ring in America." The Historian, vol. 82, no. 2 (2020), pp. 138–55.
- "Leon Turrou: The Greatest Detective of Them All?" Strand Magazine (September 2020)
- "A Forgotten Scandal: How the Nazi Spy Case Affected American Neutrality and German Diplomatic Opinion." Passport: The Society for Historians of American Foreign Relations Review (September 2020). pp. 45–48.
- With R. Gerald Hughes, “Timely Memoirs and the ‘British Invasion’: Two Trends in the Historiography of the CIA,” Journal of Intelligence History (March 2022): https://www.tandfonline.com/doi/full/10.1080/16161262.2022.2051920
- “The Inside Story of the CIA v Russia – from cold war conspiracy to ‘black’ propaganda in Ukraine” Insights, The Conversation, 25 August 2022: https://theconversation.com/the-inside-story-of-the-cia-v-russia-from-cold-war-conspiracy-to-black-propaganda-in-ukraine-188550.
- “CIA at War – Inside the Agency’s Operations from Cold War Hotspots to 21st Century Battlefields”, Military History Now, 31 August 2022: https://militaryhistorynow.com/2022/08/31/cia-at-war-inside-the-agencys-operations-from-cold-war-hotspots-to-21st-century-battlefields/
- “Allan Pinkerton: Informed Scot or Scottish Informer?” Journal of Scottish Historical Studies, 42/2 (2022): 197–216.
- "The Pinkerton Pause: How opposition to Pinkertonism delayed the advent of the private security state," Intelligence and National Security, 39/6 (2024): 1067-1075.
- "Agnes M. Driscoll: Documents on FBI Suspicions of the Cryptographic and Feminist Icon," The Historian, 85/1 (2024): 390-401.
- "Sefyllfa'r UDA yn waeth pan o'n i byw yno yn yr 1960au," comp. Bryn Jones, Cylchgrawn BBC Cymru Fyw, 31 Ionawr 2026. https://www.bbc.co.uk/cymrufyw/erthyglau/cgl8pw9z1yro.
- "The Bendigeidfran Statue in Harlech: A Study in Conceptualisation, Politics, and Cultural Significance," Cylchgrawn Cymdeithas Hanes a Chofnodion Sir Feirionydd/Journal of the Merioneth Historical and Record Society, 20 (2026): 58-75.
- "The Bureau and the Nazi Spies," History Today, 76/10 (October 2026): 64-73.
