= List of listed buildings in Falkland, Fife =

This is a list of listed buildings in the parish of Falkland in Fife, Scotland.

== List ==
Name	Location	Date listed	Grid ref. (Note: Sometimes known as OSGB36, the grid reference (where provided) is based on the British national grid reference system used by the Ordnance Survey. • "Guide to National Grid". Ordnance Survey. • "Get-a-map". Ordnance Survey.)	Geo-coordinates	Notes	LB number (Note: Historic Environment Scotland assign a unique alphanumeric identifier to each designated site in Scotland, for listed buildings this always begins with "LB", for example "LB12345".)	Image
Graveyard, High Street West Port				56°15′09″N 3°12′39″W	Category C(S)	31290	Upload another image See more images
Dovecot (House), Pleasance				56°15′12″N 3°12′17″W	Category C(S)	31295	Upload another image
Crinan, Back Wynd (Including Garden Walls)				56°15′10″N 3°12′25″W	Category C(S)	31298	Upload Photo
House (Messrs Thomas & Alexander Pedder), Back Wynd				56°15′08″N 3°12′23″W	Category C(S)	31304	Upload Photo
Wellbrae, South Street At Corner Of Well Brae (Including Garden Wall To Well Brae)				56°15′07″N 3°12′23″W	Category B	31318	Upload Photo
House And Shop (Markinch And District Co-Operative Society Ltd) Horsemarket (Including Garden Wall)				56°15′07″N 3°12′25″W	Category C(S)	31325	Upload Photo
Wester Brunton House (National Trust Formerly Colin Hamilton) Brunton Street, (Including Outbuilding And Garden Walls)				56°15′09″N 3°12′30″W	Category B	31329	Upload Photo
House (Mr Ross), South Street West				56°15′09″N 3°12′32″W	Category C(S)	31333	Upload Photo
West Cottage And The Cottage West Port				56°15′11″N 3°12′44″W	Category C(S)	31343	Upload Photo
Viewhill, West Port				56°15′11″N 3°12′45″W	Category C(S)	31344	Upload Photo
House Of Falkland East Lodge And Gates West Port				56°15′13″N 3°12′57″W	Category B	31350	Upload another image See more images
2-6 Royal Terrace				56°15′01″N 3°12′13″W	Category B	31358	Upload Photo
Falkland Parish Church High Street				56°15′12″N 3°12′29″W	Category B	31254	Upload another image See more images
St Andrew House High Street (Including Garden Walls)				56°15′13″N 3°12′26″W	Category B	31257	Upload Photo
Stag Inn, High Street And Mill Wynd				56°15′11″N 3°12′31″W	Category B	31262	Upload Photo
House (Mrs Elizabeth Bayne) And Embo, High Street, West Port Opposite Foot Of Lomonds Road				56°15′11″N 3°12′42″W	Category B	31271	Upload Photo
Old Tollhouse Newton Of Falkland				56°15′03″N 3°10′54″W	Category C(S)	8770	Upload another image
1 Malt Loan (Or Row) Off Jubilee Crescent Newton Of Falkland				56°15′07″N 3°11′00″W	Category C(S)	8773	Upload Photo
Courtside, High Street West (Including Garage And Garden Walls)				56°15′10″N 3°12′41″W	Category C(S)	31292	Upload Photo
Oaklea, East Port				56°15′12″N 3°12′21″W	Category C(S)	31297	Upload Photo
Dunira, Back Wynd				56°15′11″N 3°12′26″W	Category C(S)	31305	Upload Photo
Lomond Tavern, Horsemarket				56°15′08″N 3°12′27″W	Category C(S)	31319	Upload Photo
Rosedale, Horsemarket				56°15′08″N 3°12′26″W	Category C(S)	31320	Upload Photo
Lomond Cottage, West Port				56°15′10″N 3°12′43″W	Category C(S)	31347	Upload Photo
Rosebank, West Port				56°15′11″N 3°12′46″W	Category C(S)	31349	Upload Photo
7, 8 Royal Terrace				56°14′59″N 3°12′13″W	Category C(S)	31359	Upload Photo
Parish Church Manse Including Garden Wall And Offices, Chapel Yard				56°14′55″N 3°11′52″W	Category B	31361	Upload Photo
House (Mr Henry Dolly), High Street				56°15′10″N 3°12′34″W	Category B	31263	Upload Photo
Moncrief House, High Street				56°15′12″N 3°12′24″W	Category A	31274	Upload another image
Covenanter Hotel (Formerly Commercial Hotel), High Street				56°15′11″N 3°12′27″W	Category B	31278	Upload another image See more images
"Betty's" Fashion And Footwear Shop (Mrs Elizabeth Crawford High Street				56°15′10″N 3°12′31″W	Category B	31279	Upload Photo
Houses (Ross And Drysdale), High Street (Including Garden Walls)				56°15′10″N 3°12′30″W	Category B	31282	Upload Photo
Newtown Of Falkland Bonthrone Maltings ( Formerly Newton Old Brewery)				56°15′03″N 3°10′56″W	Category B	13311	Upload Photo
Balmblae Cottage Including Garden Walls Balmblae, Falkland				56°15′13″N 3°12′31″W	Category B	8802	Upload Photo
Bellfield Cottage, Jubilee Crescent Newton Of Falkland				56°15′07″N 3°11′02″W	Category C(S)	8811	Upload Photo
House And Shop (H Grant) High Street, Freuchie				56°14′52″N 3°09′31″W	Category B	8816	Upload Photo
Albert Tavern, High Street, Freuchie				56°14′53″N 3°09′22″W	Category C(S)	8817	Upload Photo
Freuchie Mill - Miller's House				56°14′49″N 3°08′50″W	Category C(S)	8821	Upload Photo
Drums Farmhouse				56°14′06″N 3°10′45″W	Category C(S)	8823	Upload Photo
Pittillock House				56°13′56″N 3°09′49″W	Category B	8825	Upload Photo
Millfield House, Falkland				56°15′05″N 3°12′43″W	Category B	8769	Upload Photo
Freuchie, Eden Valley Row, Former Eden Valley Linen Works Including Gate Piers And Boundary Walls				56°14′59″N 3°09′21″W	Category B	49305	Upload Photo
Newton Of Falkland, Jubilee Crescent And Main Street, Water Pumps And Wells				56°15′03″N 3°10′59″W	Category C(S)	45583	Upload Photo
Cottages (Drysdale And Davidson), East Port				56°15′13″N 3°12′19″W	Category B	31296	Upload Photo
House And Stable And Store Building (Miss Smith) Back Wynd				56°15′10″N 3°12′25″W	Category C(S)	31306	Upload Photo
Seton House, Cross Wynd				56°15′11″N 3°12′28″W	Category C(S)	31308	Upload Photo
Millbank (Formerly Miller's House Of Bruce's Mill) Mill Wynd				56°15′12″N 3°12′33″W	Category C(S)	31338	Upload Photo
House (Elizabeth Douglas) Victoria Place				56°15′04″N 3°12′15″W	Category C(S)	31354	Upload Photo
Gowanbank Well Brae				56°15′02″N 3°12′16″W	Category C(S)	31356	Upload Photo
High Street, Old Post Office (Miss Middleton) Including Garden Walls				56°15′12″N 3°12′27″W	Category B	31258	Upload Photo
Falkland Palace Royal Stables And Tennis Court Or Caichpule				56°15′20″N 3°12′21″W	Category A	8800	Upload another image
Balerno And Adjoining Cottage (Archibald Laing). Jubilee Crescent, Newton Of Falkland				56°15′08″N 3°11′02″W	Category C(S)	8810	Upload Photo
Freuchie Mill				56°14′48″N 3°08′51″W	Category C(S)	8820	Upload Photo
House Of Falkland, Bridge Over Roaring Or Mill Burn And Adjoining Gatepiers				56°15′07″N 3°13′26″W	Category B	8766	Upload Photo
Braeside Off Jubilee Crescent Newton Of Falkland				56°15′06″N 3°11′00″W	Category C(S)	8772	Upload Photo
High Street, West Port, House (Stewart) Including Garden Walls				56°15′10″N 3°12′38″W	Category C(S)	31289	Upload Photo
Parish Church Hall, New Road				56°15′14″N 3°12′16″W	Category B	31293	Upload another image
Hillview (Nelson), Back Wynd (Including Garden Walls)				56°15′09″N 3°12′24″W	Category C(S)	31300	Upload Photo
Youth Hostel, Back Wynd (Including Garden Walls)				56°15′09″N 3°12′24″W	Category C(S)	31301	Upload Photo
House (Mrs Lilias Chisholm), Cross Wynd				56°15′10″N 3°12′28″W	Category B	31310	Upload Photo
The Shien (James Kilbane), Parliament Square, Cross Wynd				56°15′09″N 3°12′27″W	Category C(S)	31313	Upload Photo
House (Miss Elizabeth Skinner), South Street				56°15′07″N 3°12′22″W	Category B	31317	Upload Photo
Southbank And Chemist's Shop (Leven) Together With Outbuilding To South Street, Horsemarket				56°15′08″N 3°12′24″W	Category B	31326	Upload Photo
Brunton House, Brunton Street (Including Garden Walls)				56°15′09″N 3°12′29″W	Category A	31328	Upload another image
Houses (Partly Restored As Cottage Craft Centre And Partly In Ruins) Sharp's Close, Off Brunton Street				56°15′09″N 3°12′31″W	Category B	31330	Upload Photo
Stable Yard Of Bruce's Mill House, (Now Demolished)				56°15′12″N 3°12′33″W	Category C(S)	31337	Upload Photo
Mill Wynd Bridge, Over Maspie Burn				56°15′12″N 3°12′32″W	Category C(S)	31340	Upload Photo
Lilac Bank (2 Houses) West Port				56°15′10″N 3°12′44″W	Category C(S)	31348	Upload Photo
Key House (Formerly Palace Inn) And Key Cottage, High Street				56°15′13″N 3°12′26″W	Category B	31256	Upload Photo
The Wee Hoose, High Street, West Port				56°15′11″N 3°12′39″W	Category C(S)	31268	Upload Photo
Mrs Elizabeth Crawford's Premises (Richard Howden's Shop) High St				56°15′10″N 3°12′29″W	Category C(S)	31280	Upload Photo
House (Vacant, Mrs Grieve) High Street, North Side, East Of Bridge, Freuchie				56°14′56″N 3°09′40″W	Category B	8815	Upload Photo
House (G Houston) Lomond Road, Freuchie				56°14′51″N 3°09′35″W	Category B	8819	Upload Photo
Temple, Green Hill				56°15′00″N 3°14′33″W	Category C(S)	8768	Upload Photo
Spittal And Son's Property, High Street And South Street West				56°15′10″N 3°12′32″W	Category B	31285	Upload Photo
House (Mr Alexander Young), High Street (Including Garden Walls)				56°15′10″N 3°12′35″W	Category B	31287	Upload Photo
House (Mr Mackie, Formerly National Trust For Scotland), Cross Wynd				56°15′10″N 3°12′28″W	Category B	31309	Upload Photo
Kind Kyttock's Kitchen (Mrs Chisholm) Cross Wynd				56°15′08″N 3°12′32″W	Category C(S)	31311	Upload Photo
House (Mrs Christina Wylie), Cross Wynd At Corner Of Horse Market				56°15′08″N 3°12′28″W	Category C(S)	31314	Upload Photo
House (Mr Robert Craig) Horsemarket				56°15′08″N 3°12′26″W	Category C(S)	31321	Upload Photo
Dundrennan, Horsemarket				56°15′08″N 3°12′25″W	Category C(S)	31322	Upload Photo
Glenvale House, Mill Wynd				56°15′12″N 3°12′32″W	Category B	31335	Upload Photo
Millyard House Millyard Off Mill Wynd, Including Garden Walls				56°15′11″N 3°12′34″W	Category B	31339	Upload Photo
Floraves, West Port				56°15′11″N 3°12′43″W	Category C(S)	31342	Upload Photo
Hope Cottage, West Port				56°15′11″N 3°12′47″W	Category C(S)	31346	Upload Photo
House Of Falkland, Fish Pond Bridges				56°15′13″N 3°13′00″W	Category B	31351	Upload another image
House Of Falkland, Memorial Chapel				56°15′08″N 3°13′00″W	Category B	31352	Upload another image See more images
1 Royal Terrace				56°15′02″N 3°12′15″W	Category B	31357	Upload Photo
Bruce Fountain, High Street				56°15′11″N 3°12′29″W	Category B	31255	Upload another image See more images
House (Miss Margaret Shields), High Street, West Port				56°15′10″N 3°12′40″W	Category C(S)	31269	Upload Photo
Beeways, High Street West				56°15′11″N 3°12′41″W	Category B	31270	Upload Photo
Bank Of Scotland (Formerly British Linen) And Town Clerk's Office High Street And Back Wynd.(Including Garden Walls)				56°15′12″N 3°12′25″W	Category B	31276	Upload Photo
Falkland Palace - Castle				56°15′17″N 3°12′22″W	Category B	8799	Upload Photo
Bellfield Cottage - Outbuilding Jubilee Crescent, Newton Of Falkland				56°15′06″N 3°11′01″W	Category C(S)	8812	Upload Photo
St Katharine's Church Place, Freuchie				56°14′51″N 3°09′23″W	Category C(S)	8818	Upload Photo
Freuchie Mill Bridge				56°14′49″N 3°08′49″W	Category C(S)	8822	Upload Photo
House Of Falkland - Bruce Monument On Black Hill				56°15′15″N 3°14′49″W	Category B	8767	Upload another image
Electricity Sub-Station High Street				56°15′10″N 3°12′32″W	Category B	31284	Upload another image
House (Empty, Formerly Mrs Jean Clark), Back Wynd				56°15′08″N 3°12′23″W	Category C(S)	31303	Upload Photo
House (David Bett) Parliament Square, Cross Wynd, Including Buildings Of Courtyard At Rear				56°15′09″N 3°12′28″W	Category B	31312	Upload Photo
Ivy Cottage And Kirken Cross Wynd				56°15′07″N 3°12′28″W	Category C(S)	31315	Upload Photo
Three Houses (Mrs Honeyman And National Trust), Brunton Street, At Corner Of Cross Wynd				56°15′08″N 3°12′29″W	Category B	31327	Upload Photo
House (Mr Walker, Formerly 2 Houses) South Street West Including Garden Walls (Mutual On West Side With Belmont, South Street West)				56°15′09″N 3°12′31″W	Category C(S)	31332	Upload Photo
Maspie Cottage, Mill Wynd				56°15′12″N 3°12′32″W	Category C(S)	31336	Upload Photo
Victoria Cottage Victoria Place				56°15′02″N 3°12′14″W	Category C(S)	31355	Upload Photo
Chapel Yard House, Chapel Yard				56°14′56″N 3°11′55″W	Category B	31362	Upload Photo
The Saddlers, High Street				56°15′12″N 3°12′27″W	Category B	31259	Upload Photo
Fountain House, High Street				56°15′11″N 3°12′30″W	Category B	31260	Upload Photo
Tornaveen, High Street				56°15′12″N 3°12′21″W	Category B	31272	Upload Photo
Ladieburn Cottage, High Street				56°15′12″N 3°12′23″W	Category C(S)	31273	Upload Photo
Bruce Arms Inn, High Street (Including Garden Walls)				56°15′12″N 3°12′24″W	Category B	31275	Upload Photo
Falkland Palace, Walls Enclosing Palace Garden And Stables Including Gates And Tyndall Bruce Statue				56°15′13″N 3°12′23″W	Category B	10796	Upload Photo
Private Bridge Between Palace And House Of Falkland Over Castle Shotts Drive, With Wall And Gateway On East Side Of Castle Shotts Drive				56°15′15″N 3°12′33″W	Category B	8801	Upload Photo
In A Nook, High Street, Freuchie				56°14′55″N 3°09′40″W	Category B	8814	Upload Photo
House Of Falkland - Stables				56°15′14″N 3°13′04″W	Category B	8764	Upload another image See more images
Wayside Cottage Jubilee Crescent Newton Of Falkland				56°15′04″N 3°11′02″W	Category C(S)	8771	Upload Photo
East Lomond Limekiln				56°14′20″N 3°13′52″W	Category B	51769	Upload another image See more images
House (John Craig), High Street (Including Garden Walls Mutual With Belmont In South Street West On East Side)				56°15′09″N 3°12′33″W	Category C(S)	31286	Upload Photo
High Street, Bruce`S Buildings Including Garden Walls				56°15′10″N 3°12′35″W	Category C(S)	31288	Upload Photo
House (Miss Margaret Shields) High Street West Port (Including Garden Walls)				56°15′10″N 3°12′40″W	Category B	31291	Upload Photo
Beechgrove, Pleasance				56°15′13″N 3°12′17″W	Category B	31294	Upload Photo
House (Stebbings), Back Wynd (Including Garden Walls)				56°15′10″N 3°12′25″W	Category C(S)	31299	Upload Photo
Smith & Anderson's Stable And Store, Back Wynd				56°15′08″N 3°12′25″W	Category C(S)	31307	Upload Photo
House (Mr William Collins), Horsemarket At Corner Of Back Wynd				56°15′08″N 3°12′25″W	Category B	31323	Upload Photo
Backdykes, Sharp's Close Off Brunton Street				56°15′09″N 3°12′30″W	Category C(S)	31331	Upload Photo
Premises (Spittal & Son) South Street West				56°15′10″N 3°12′32″W	Category B	31334	Upload Photo
Hillerye Cottages, West Port				56°15′11″N 3°12′46″W	Category C(S)	31345	Upload Photo
Royal Terrace, South Section				56°14′59″N 3°12′13″W	Category C(S)	31360	Upload Photo
House (National Trust, Empty In 1971), High Street West				56°15′10″N 3°12′35″W	Category B	31264	Upload Photo
Bellsehill, High Street, West Port				56°15′10″N 3°12′38″W	Category C(S)	31267	Upload Photo
Falkland Town Hall, High Street				56°15′11″N 3°12′27″W	Category A	31277	Upload another image See more images
Newton Of Falkland, Jubilee Crescent, Rose Cottage				56°15′08″N 3°11′04″W	Category C(S)	10797	Upload Photo
Falkland Palace				56°15′13″N 3°12′23″W	Category A	8798	Upload another image See more images
Castle Shotts, Including Garden Walls Balmblae, Falkland				56°15′14″N 3°12′33″W	Category B	8803	Upload Photo
Bridgend, East End, Balmblae, Falkland				56°15′13″N 3°12′33″W	Category B	8804	Upload another image
Balreavie, House And Steading				56°14′43″N 3°11′03″W	Category B	8813	Upload Photo
Drums Doocot				56°14′04″N 3°10′42″W	Category C(S)	8824	Upload Photo
2 Malt Loan (Or Row) Off Jubilee Crescent Newton Of Falkland				56°15′07″N 3°11′00″W	Category C(S)	8774	Upload Photo
Claredale, Rottenrow, Off High Street (Including Outbuildings With Garage On South Street West)				56°15′10″N 3°12′31″W	Category C(S)	31283	Upload Photo
The Haven, Back Wynd				56°15′08″N 3°12′24″W	Category B	31302	Upload Photo
Ravenscraig, South Street				56°15′07″N 3°12′23″W	Category B	31316	Upload Photo
House (Mrs Jane Drysdale), Horsemarket				56°15′07″N 3°12′25″W	Category C(S)	31324	Upload Photo
The Den, West Port				56°15′11″N 3°12′43″W	Category C(S)	31341	Upload Photo
House (James Ross) Victoria Place				56°15′05″N 3°12′15″W	Category C(S)	31353	Upload Photo
Savings Bank And Co-Operative Building, High Street				56°15′11″N 3°12′30″W	Category C(S)	31261	Upload Photo
Millyard, Off High Street At Rear Of Above				56°15′11″N 3°12′35″W	Category C(S)	31265	Upload Photo
The Weaver's Cottage (Mrs Jane Goodfellow), High Street, West Port				56°15′10″N 3°12′37″W	Category B	31266	Upload Photo
Cameron House, High St (Including Garden Walls)				56°15′10″N 3°12′30″W	Category B	31281	Upload Photo
Balreavie Cottage, Jubilee Crescent Newton Of Falkland				56°15′07″N 3°11′02″W	Category C(S)	13695	Upload Photo
House of Falkland (St Ninian's Rc School) Including Terraces And Garden Ornaments				56°15′11″N 3°13′28″W	Category A	8763	Upload another image See more images
House Of Falkland - Gilderland Bridge Over Maspie Burn				56°15′12″N 3°13′30″W	Category B	8765	Upload another image
House of Falkland Estate, tunnel on path along Maspie Burn					Category B	51859	Upload another image See more images

== Key ==
The scheme for classifying buildings in Scotland is:

- Category A: "buildings of national or international importance, either architectural or historic; or fine, little-altered examples of some particular period, style or building type."
- Category B: "buildings of regional or more than local importance; or major examples of some particular period, style or building type, which may have been altered."
- Category C: "buildings of local importance; lesser examples of any period, style, or building type, as originally constructed or moderately altered; and simple traditional buildings which group well with other listed buildings."

In March 2016 there were 47,288 listed buildings in Scotland. Of these, 8% were Category A, and 50% were Category B, with the remaining 42% being Category C.

== See also ==
- List of listed buildings in Fife
