= John Mylne =

John Mylne was the name of three Scottish master masons:

- John Mylne (died 1621)
- John Mylne (died 1657), "John Mylne of Perth", son of the above
- John Mylne (died 1667), "John Mylne junior", son of the above

== See also ==
- John Milne (disambiguation)
