= List of tallest buildings in Perth, Scotland =

This list of the tallest buildings and structures in Perth ranks buildings in the Scottish city of Perth by height. There are few high-rise buildings in Perth. The tallest buildings in the city are churches and city centre tower blocks.

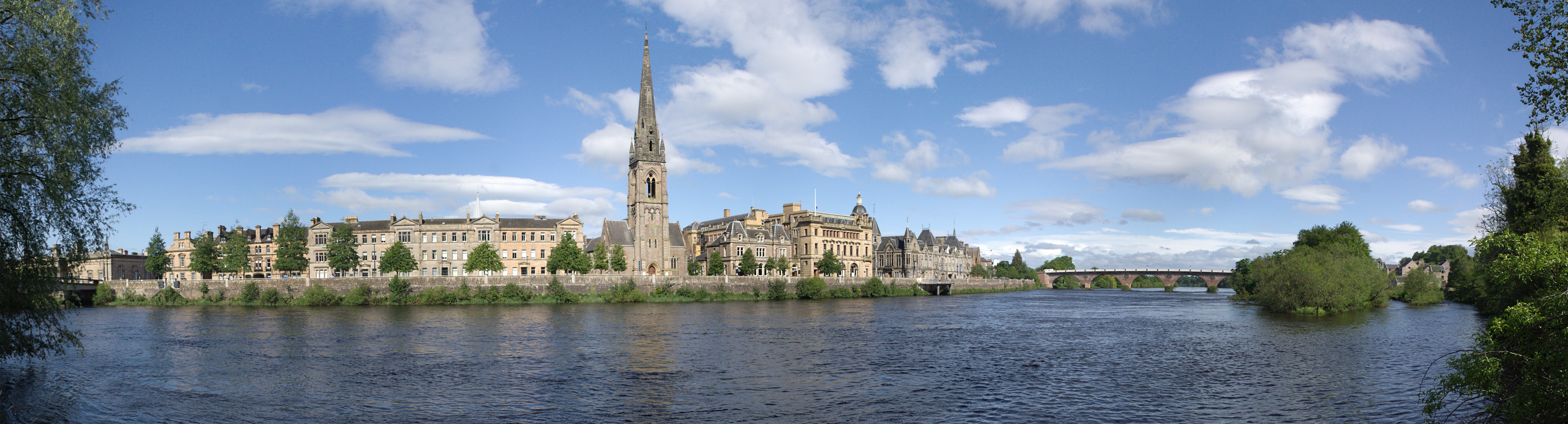
Perth's Tay Street, on the western banks of the River Tay

== Tallest buildings in Perth ==
This list ranks externally complete Perth buildings and free-standing structures that stand more than 25 metres (82 ft) tall, based on standard height measurement. This includes spires and architectural details but does not include antenna masts. An equals sign (=) following a rank indicates the same height between two or more buildings. The "Year" column indicates the year in which a building was completed. Buildings that have been demolished (including the towering chimney of Pullar's Dyeworks) are not included. Some prominent Perth buildings such as St Ninian's Cathedral are just below this threshold.

Rank	Name	Picture	Height	Coordinates	Floors	Year	Notes	Reference
1	St Matthew's Church		65 metres (213 ft)	56.3961989°N 3.4259256°W	1	1871	Category B listed	
2	St John's Kirk		47 metres (154 ft)	56.3958509°N 3.4281079°W	1	1448	Category A listed Oldest extant building in Perth	
3	St Paul's Church		123 feet (37 m)	56.3966511°N 3.4348110°W	-	1807	Category B listed	
4	St Leonard's-in-the-Fields		117 feet (36 m)	56.3923138°N 3.4325852°W	1	1885	Category A listed	
5	Fergusson Art Gallery formerly Perth Water Works		110 feet (34 m)	56.3923157°N 3.4263996°W	1	1832	Category A listed Oldest cast iron structure in the world	
6	Pomarium Flats		32 metres (105 ft)	56.3932816°N 3.4359047°W	11	1960	Tallest residential building in Perth	
7	St John the Baptist Episcopal Church		100 feet (30 m)	56.3939970°N 3.4280747°W	1	1851	Category B listed	
8=	Lickley Court		28 metres (92 ft)	56.3965869°N 3.4382238°W	9	1975		
8=	Market Court		28 metres (92 ft)	56.3962595°N 3.4374088°W	9	1975		
8=	Milne Court		28 metres (92 ft)	56.3962133°N 3.4381390°W	9	1975		
11=	Potterhill Gardens		25 metres (82 ft)	56.3990801°N 3.4215170°W	8	1963	Tallest building located outside the city centre; located in Bridgend	
11=	Pomarium Flats		25 metres (82 ft)	56.3938004°N 3.4359681°W	8	1960		

== Tallest structures in Perth ==
Rank	Structure name	Picture	Height	Coordinates	Year	Notes	Reference
1	Fergusson Art Gallery formerly Perth Water Works		110 feet (34 m)	56.3923157°N 3.4263996°W	1832	Category A listed Oldest cast iron structure in the world	
2	Friarton Bridge		100 feet (30 m)	56.3791770°N 3.4090286°W	1978		

== See also ==
- List of tallest buildings and structures in Edinburgh
- List of tallest buildings and structures in Glasgow
