= Robert Mylne (mason) =

Scottish stonemason and architect (1633–1710)

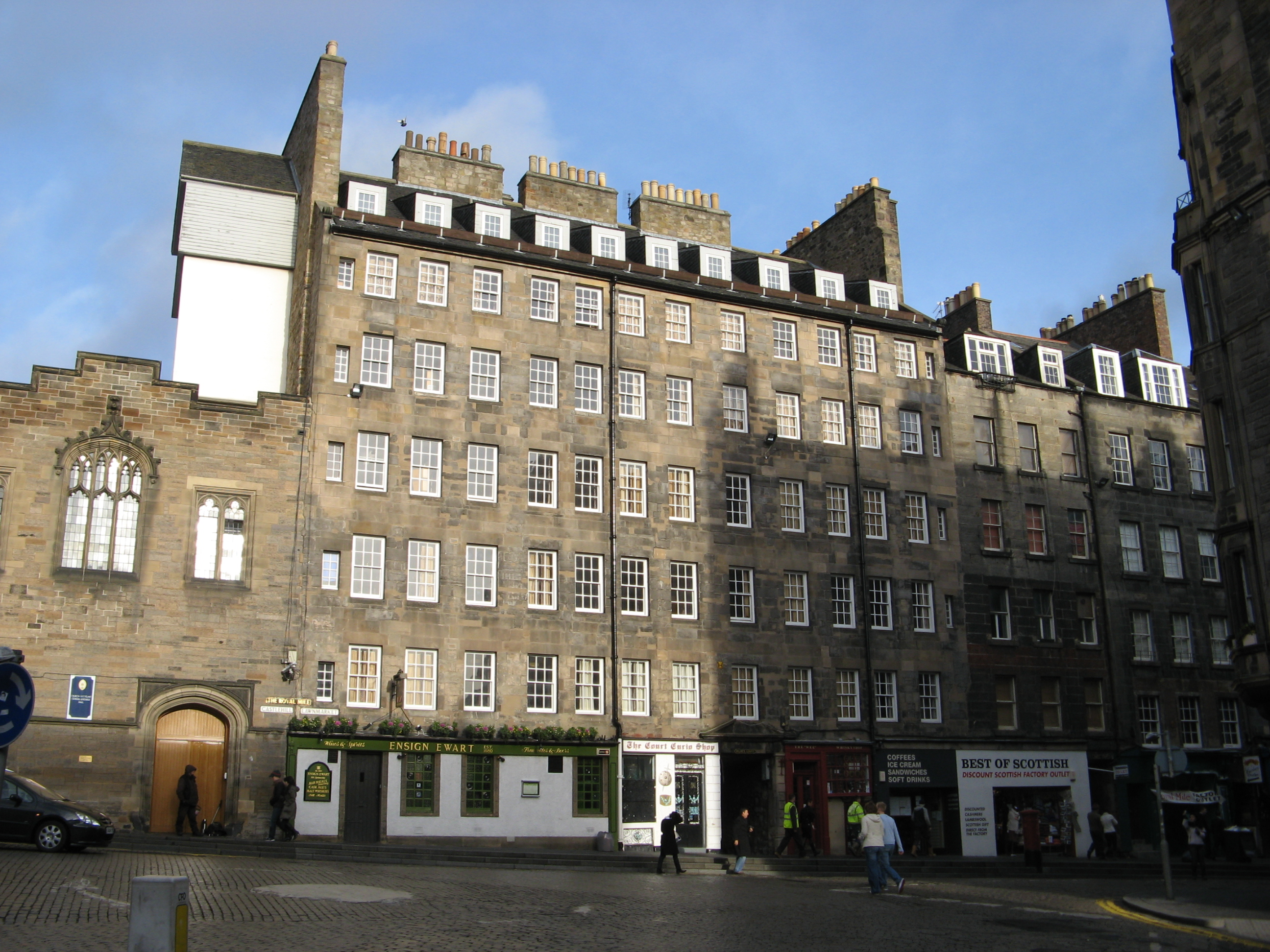
Milne's Court on Edinburgh's Royal Mile

Robert Mylne (1633 – 10 December 1710) was a Scottish stonemason and architect. A descendant of the Mylne family of masons and builders, Robert was the last Master Mason to the Crown of Scotland, a post he held from 1668 until his death.

== Biography ==
Robert was a member of the Mylne family of masons and architects. His grandfather, John Mylne (died 1657), served as Master Mason to the Crown from 1631 to 1636, when he resigned in favour of his eldest son, also named John Mylne (1611–1667). His second son, Alexander Mylne (1613–1643), was an architectural sculptor, who carved statues for Parliament House. Robert was the son of Alexander Mylne, and served his apprenticeship with his childless uncle John. In 1660 he became a burgess of Edinburgh and was also admitted to the Lodge of Edinburgh (Mary's Chapel) No. 1, which he later served as warden.

After his apprenticeship, Mylne undertook his first known building project at John Wood's Hospital, Upper Largo, Fife, in 1665. In 1668 he was engaged to build a new mercat cross at Perth, to replace one destroyed by Oliver Cromwell's army in 1652. After his uncle's death, he completed Leslie House, for the Earl of Rothes, and extended Wemyss Castle for the Earl of Wemyss. He also worked at Drumlanrig Castle, for the Earl of Queensberry. As Royal master mason, Mylne was responsible for works to the Royal castles, and repaired Edinburgh Castle in 1662, 1677, and 1685. The Mylne Battery at the castle was named after him.

In 1671, work began on Holyrood Palace, on the orders of King Charles II. Sir William Bruce prepared the Palladian design, although Mylne drew up the plans, and was appointed master mason and contractor in charge of the works. His name appears on a pillar in the north-west corner of the internal courtyard. Simultaneously, Mylne was working under Bruce at Thirlestane Castle, home of the Duke of Lauderdale, who, as Secretary of State for Scotland, was also overseeing the work at Holyrood. Also for Lauderdale, Mylne built gate piers, to Bruce's design, for the Duke's English home, Ham House in Surrey.

Between 1674 and 1681, again working to Bruce's designs, Mylne constructed a series of cisterns in Edinburgh, as part of a new drinking water supply to the capital. In 1678 Mylne's completed a speculative building project on the Shore in Leith, the port of Edinburgh. He purchased a plot of land and constructed a four storey and basement high tenement containing fifteen dwellings. It has been argued that this is the first modern tenement in Scotland, utilising a classical ashlar facade and a narrow double pile plan facing the street. In 1684–86, he built a larger development, Mylne's Square, opposite the Tron Kirk in the heart of Edinburgh. This square was the first home of the Bank of Scotland when it was founded in 1695, although the square was demolished in the 19th century to make way for the widened North Bridge. This was followed, in 1690, by Milne's Court, further up the Royal Mile, now occupied by student accommodation. Mylne also built numerous tenement blocks for others. The profits of these projects allowed him to purchase the estates of Balfargie in Fife, and Inveresk, east of Edinburgh, where he died aged 77. He was buried in Greyfriars Kirkyard, under the monument which he erected to his uncle.

Robert Mylne had eight sons and six daughters by his wife, Elizabeth Meikle, whom he had married in 1661. His eldest daughter Janet married the architect James Smith, who had worked for Mylne at Holyrood. His eldest son William (1662–1728) continued the Mylne family business of building, and his great-grandson Robert Mylne (1733–1811) became an architect and engineer in London.
