= Greyfriars Burial Ground =

Cemetery in Perth, Scotland

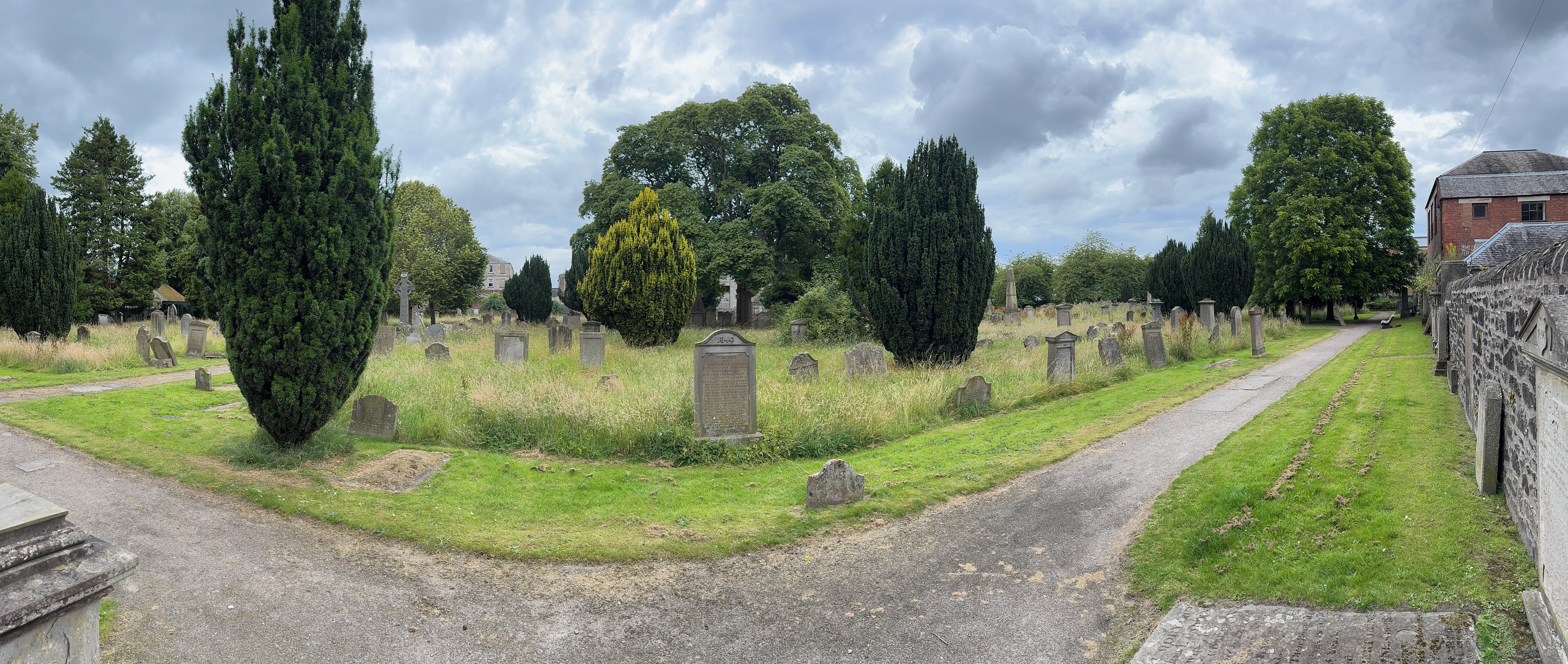
- The cemetery in 2024
- Interactive map of Greyfriars Burial Ground

Details
- Established: 1580 (446 years ago)
- Closed: 1978
- Location: Canal Street; Perth
- Country: Scotland
- Coordinates: 56.39367°N 3.42718°W
- Owned by: Perth and Kinross Council
- Find a Grave: Greyfriars Burial Ground

Greyfriars Burial Ground is an historic cemetery in Perth, Scotland. Dating to 1580, it is now Category A listed, with its collection of gravestones considered one of the best in Scotland. The cemetery closed to burials in 1978.

The cemetery occupies the former location of the Greyfriars Monastery, founded by Laurence Oliphant, 1st Lord Oliphant, in 1496 and destroyed in 1559 at the start of the Scottish Reformation.

As per documentation dating to 1911, "no burial is permitted of the body of a person who at the time of death resided out of the old parish, excepting that of a widower or widow, son or daughter who have never been married." A superintendent was in attendance every morning between 10 and 11 AM, then between 11 AM and 1 PM at Wellshill Cemetery.

The cemetery is located at the eastern end of Canal Street, near its junction with Tay Street. It has been extended south on two occasions, and it now abuts the bridge carrying the Perth-to-Dundee section of the Scottish railway network.

Also on the southern side of the cemetery is a roofed section under which are thirteen early gravestones. Moved for conservation purposes, they include the oldest gravestone in the cemetery (Buchan, 1580).

A tablet commemorating John Mylne, who "rebuilt the ancient bridge over the River Tay," was erected by Robert Mylne in 1784.

In 1997, when proposals were made to dismantle and rebuild the cemetery's eastern wall, two test pits were dug by the Scottish Urban Archaeological Trust (SUAT). One of the pits found what is believed to be the original monastery wall foundations. A "succession of wall foundations" hinted at several wall replacement and repair efforts undertaken during the monastery's lifespan, each raising the ground level. Medieval pottery was also discovered, likely associated with the soil of lower garden abutting the original monastery wall. The other pit demonstrated a lack of a progression of wall foundations, confirming that that area was inside the 1795 graveyard extension and outside the original monastery grounds. The second pit also showed signs of infilling or levelling layers, possibly from when a burn, which ran along the burial ground's southern wall, was covered with soil.

In 2019, several headstones deemed a hazard to passersby were removed and restored.

Perth and Kinross Council have left the grass outwith the paths around the graveyard to grow as a biodiversity plan.

== Notable interments ==
- Adam Anderson, physicist (1783–1846)
- George Ballingall, physician (1780–1855)
- William Farquhar, Madras Army officer (1774–1839)
- George Haliburton, bishop of Dunkeld (1616–1665)
- Andrew Heiton (1823–1894), architect
- William Macdonald Mackenzie (1797–1856), architect
- John Mylne (c. 1585–1657), mason
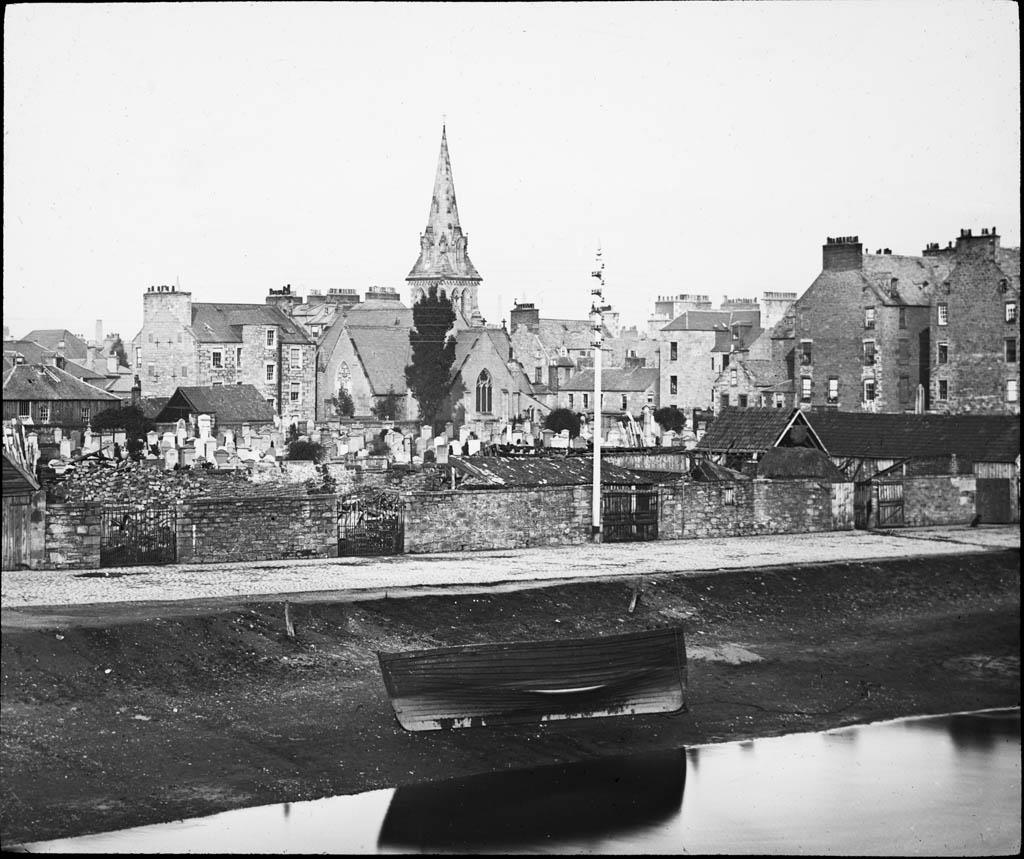
Pre-Tay Street Perth, early 19th century, with an unobstructed Greyfriars Burial Ground

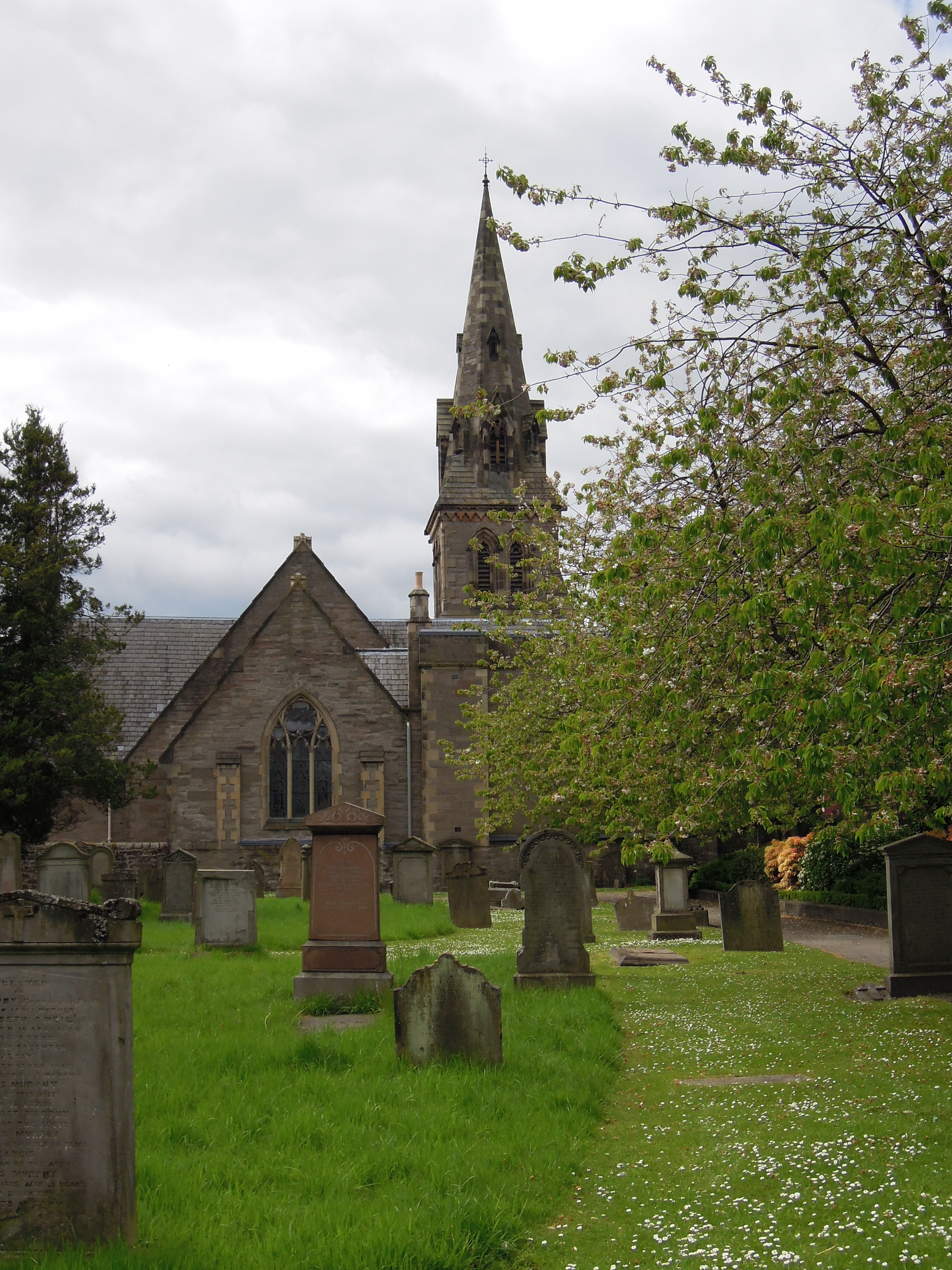
A 2013 view, with the Church of St John the Baptist in the background

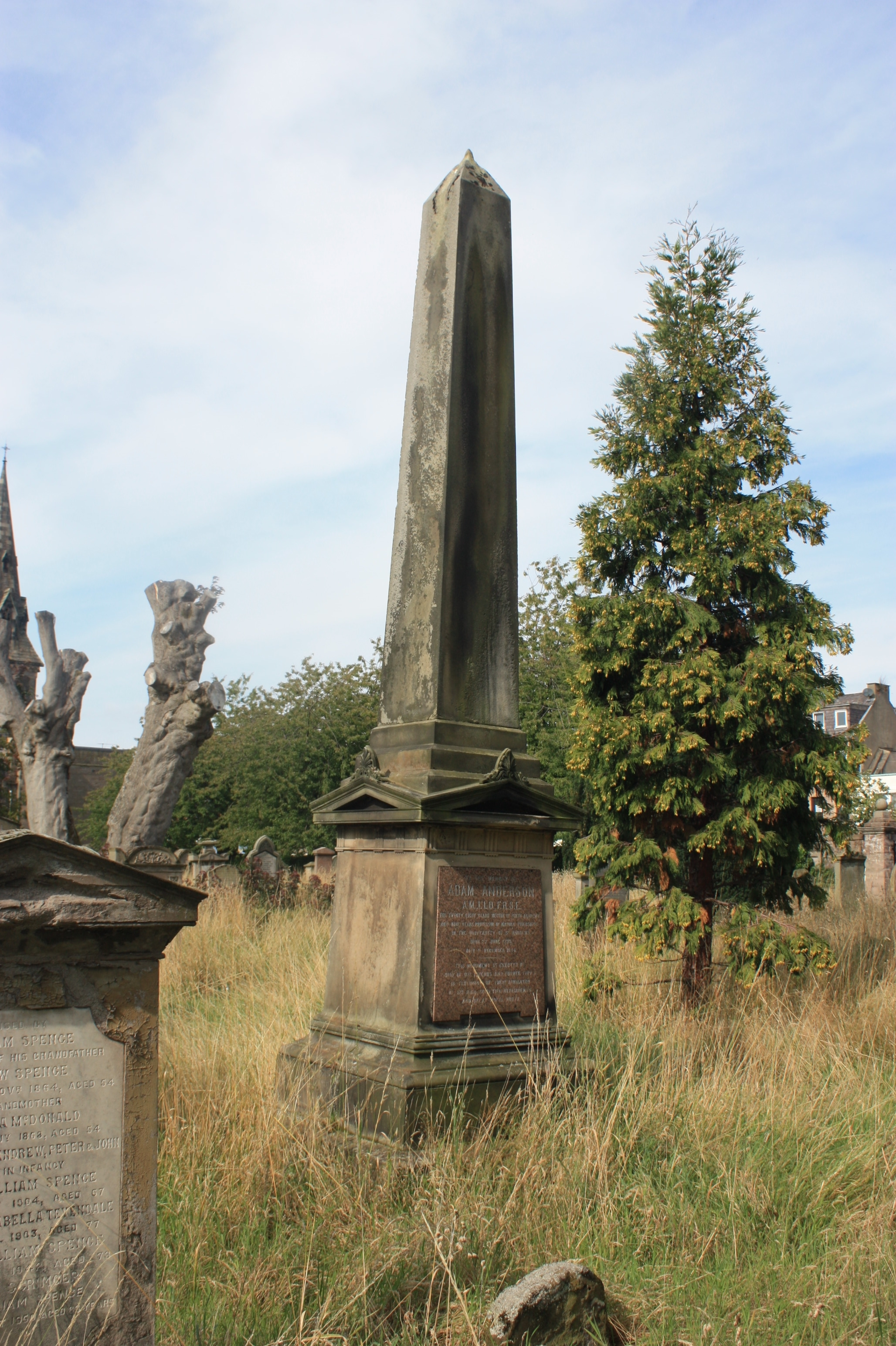
1846 grave of physicist Adam Anderson, architect of Perth Water Works, located around 500 feet (150 m) south of his resting place

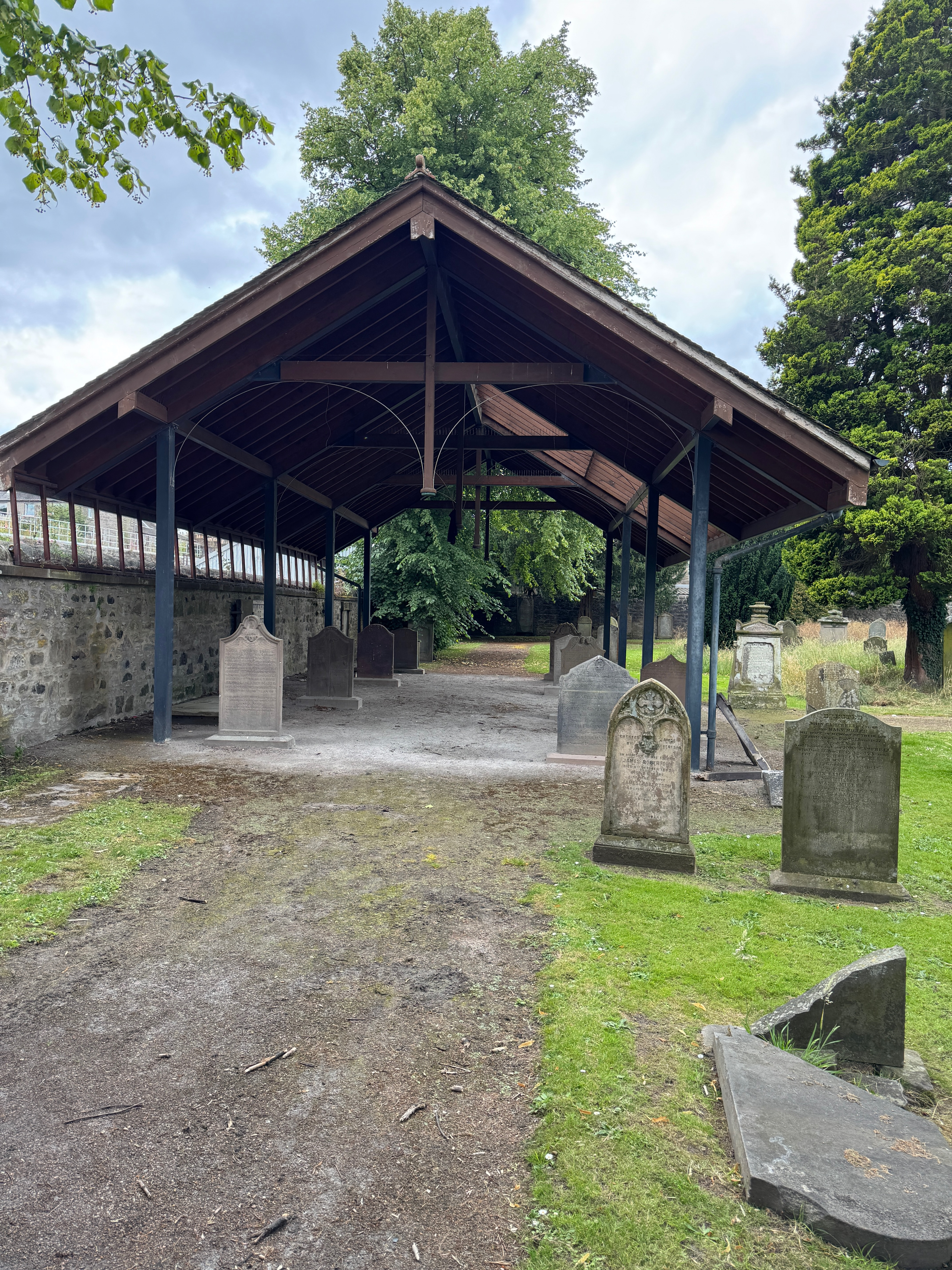
The protective shelter at the cemetery's southern wall

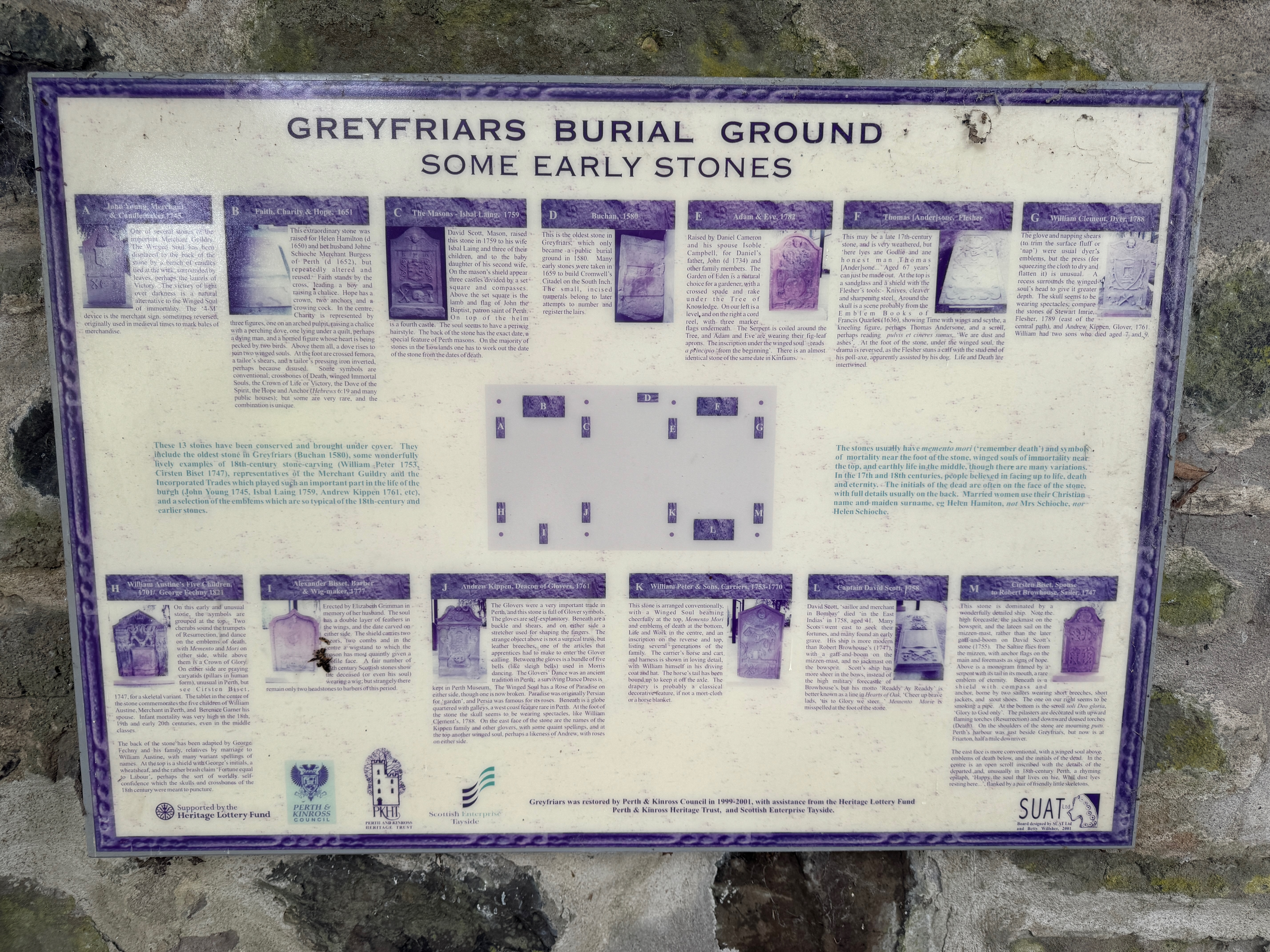
An information board within the shelter

== See also ==
- List of listed buildings in Perth, Scotland
- List of Category A listed buildings in Perth and Kinross
