= Jack Milne =

Jack Milne may refer to:

- Jack Milne (speedway rider)
  - Jack Milne Cup
- Jack Milne (footballer)

== See also ==
- John Milne (disambiguation)
