= Greyfriars, Perth =

Former friary of the Franciscan Order

Coordinates: 56.39367°N 3.42718°W

Observant Order of Greyfriars
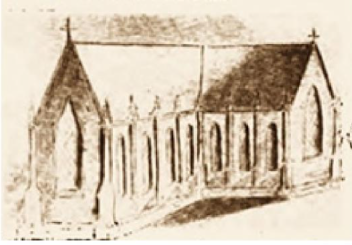

Monastery information
- Order: Franciscan
- Established: 1496 (529 years ago)
- Disestablished: 1559 (466 years ago)
- Dedicated to: Francis of Assisi

People
- Founder(s): Laurence Oliphant, 1st Lord Oliphant

The Observant Order of Greyfriars (or Greyfriars) was a friary of the Franciscan Order located in the Scottish city of Perth. It was founded by Laurence Oliphant, 1st Lord Oliphant, in 1496 and destroyed on 11 May 1559 following the Scottish Reformation, started by John Knox in his sermon at Perth's St John's Kirk, just a few hundred yards to the north.

The monastery's location is now partly occupied by the Greyfriars Burial Ground, established in 1580. In 1997, when proposals were made to dismantle and rebuild the cemetery's eastern wall, two test pits were dug by the Scottish Urban Archaeological Trust (SUAT). One of the pits found what is believed to be the original monastery wall foundations. A "succession of wall foundations" hinted at several wall replacement and repair efforts undertaken during the monastery's lifespan, each raising the ground level. Medieval pottery was also discovered, likely associated with the soil of lower garden abutting the original monastery wall. The other pit demonstrated a lack of a progression of wall foundations, confirming that that area was inside the 1795 graveyard extension and outside the original monastery grounds. The second pit also showed signs of infilling or levelling layers, possibly from when a burn, which ran along the burial ground's southern wall, was covered with soil.

== See also ==
- Blackfriars, Perth
