= House of Falkland =

Architectural structure in Scotland

Coordinates: 56.2529°N 3.2242°W

Designations

Inventory of Gardens and Designed Landscapes in Scotland
- Official name: House of Falkland
- Designated: 30 March 2005
- Reference no.: GDL00214

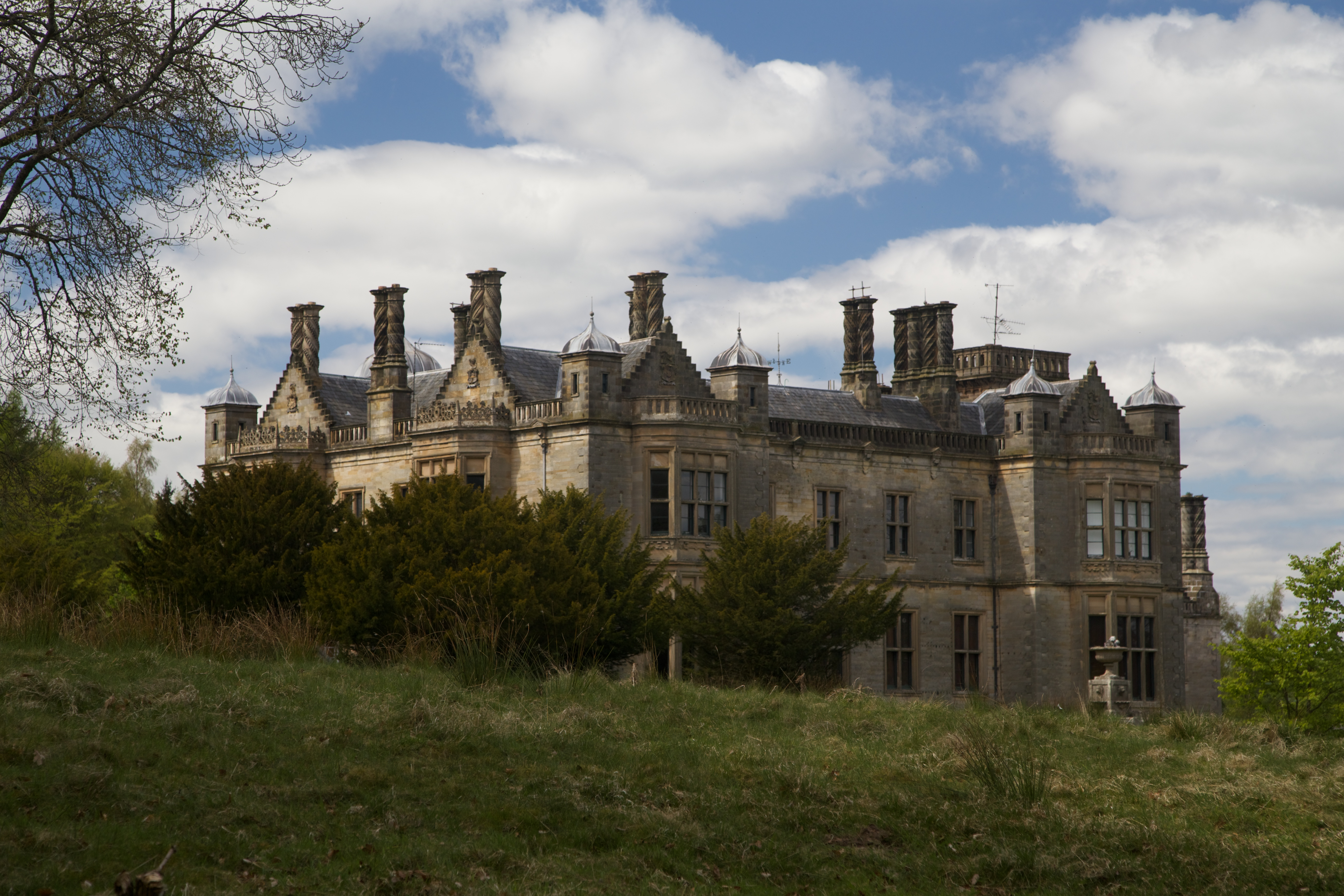
View from the south east

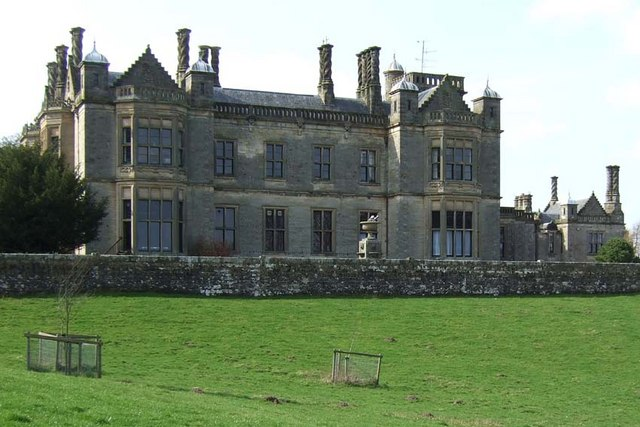
View from the garden

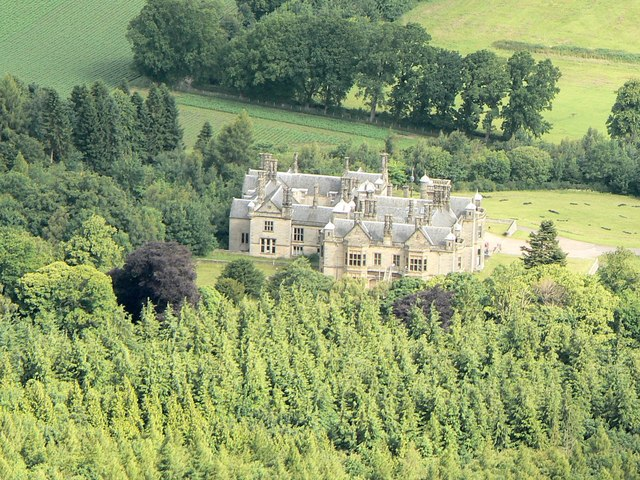
View from the hills

The House of Falkland, in Falkland, Fife, Scotland, is a 19th-century country house and has been one of the homes of John Crichton-Stuart, 3rd Marquess of Bute and the Crichton-Stuart family. The house has been designed in the 19th-century revival of late 16th and early 17th-century Elizabethan and Jacobean styles called Jacobethan.

== History ==
The origins of the House of Falkland estate can be linked to nearby Falkland Palace, which lies immediately to the east. The palace was a hunting lodge of the Scottish kings, and the House of Falkland estate was gifted to the keeper of the palace. First evidence of a house at the estate can be dated to the 16th century, a simple tower house named Nuthill House, or the Place of Nuthill. This was the home of Fairny family, rangers of the Lomond Hills, and by 1604 a residence of the courtier and keeper of Falkland Palace, David Murray of Gospertie. Murray added a wing to the house and built a new church in the village, employing John Duncan, a mason from Strathmiglo, and the master mason John Mylne.

In 1821, John Bruce acquired the estate including Nuthill house. He performed various improvements to the house and built stables. Margaret Bruce inherited the estate when her uncle died in 1826. She married Onesiphours Tyndall Bruce in 1828, and they made the decision to demolish Nuthill House and built a new home, the current House of Falkland. She engaged William Burn as architect and the house was constructed between 1839 and 1844. At the same time, a formal garden was laid out.

The house is designed in a neo Jacobean style. It consists of a main block with two service wings at the rear – the east range for the male staff and the west range for the female staff. Although the service wings are much larger than the main block, the main house was decorated and positioned in such manner that it was immediately clear to the viewer that this part was superior and the other part inferior.

In 1887, John Crichton-Stuart, 3rd Marquess of Bute, purchased the House of Falkland estate. At the same time, he also acquired Falkland palace. Between 1890 and 1900, Bute employed the architects Robert Weir Schultz and William Frame to remodel the inside, and change the landscape around the house. Upon his death, his second son Lord Ninian Crichton-Stuart inherited the estate.

During the First World War the house was used as a convalescent home, and then occasionally as a holiday home in the 1920s and the 1930s. In the Second World War, it was used as a home for Polish airmen. Due to the size of the house, the Crichton-Stuart family decided to move to Falkland palace in 1944, where they still reside up to this day. Although, the National Trust for Scotland has been brought in to help with the maintenance of the palace. The Crichton-Stuart family has transferred the ownership of the House of Falkland to the Falkland Stewardship Trust, who has leased it to Falkland House School, which provides education for boys with additional support needs. The estate is still owned by the family, but they are considering to move the ownership as well to the Falkland Stewardship Trust.
