= Falkland Town Hall =

Municipal building in Falkland, Scotland

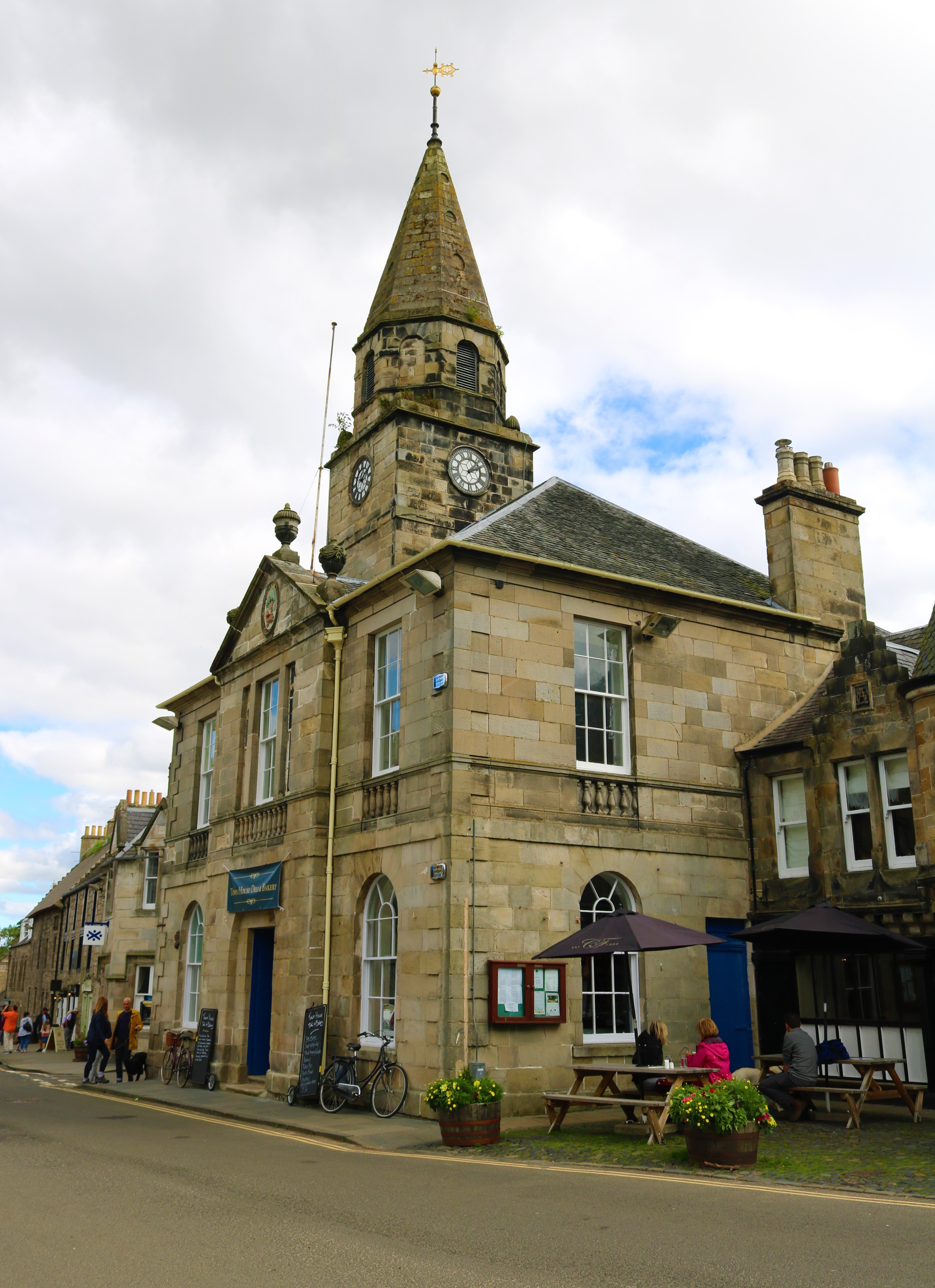
- Falkland Town Hall

- Shown in Fife
- 56.2532°N 3.2074°W
- Location: High Street, Falkland

History
- Built: 1801

Site notes
- Architect: Thomas Barclay
- Architectural style: Neoclassical style

Listed Building – Category A
- Official name: Falkland Town Hall, High Street
- Designated: 1 December 1971
- Reference no.: LB31277

Falkland Town Hall is a municipal building in the High Street, Falkland, Fife, Scotland. The structure, which has been converted for use as offices and as shops, is a Category A listed building.

== History ==
The first municipal building in the town was an old tolbooth which dated back to the 17th century. By the late 18th century, it was in a dilapidated condition and the burgh leaders, who also had ambitions for a new school, decided to demolish the old tolbooth and to erect a new town hall, which would also accommodate the school, on the same site. The new building was designed by Thomas Barclay of Balbirnie in the neoclassical style, built in ashlar stone and was completed in 1801.

The design involved a symmetrical main frontage with three bays facing onto the High Street; the central bay, which slightly projected forward, featured a square headed doorway enclosed by a round headed arch with voussoirs; there was a tri-partite mullioned window on the first floor and a pediment with the burgh coat of arms in the tympanum above. The outer bays were fenestrated by round headed sash windows on the ground floor and square headed sash windows on the first floor, and there were balustrades under each of the first-floor windows. The eastern elevation, facing onto Back Wynd, was designed in a similar style but, in the outer bays, the first-floor windows were blind, and, above the central pediment, there was a square tower which was surmounted by an octagonal belfry, a spire and a weather vane. Internally, the principal rooms were the classroom on the ground floor and the burgh council chamber on the first floor. The council chamber contained some fine decorative plasterwork. The bell, which had been cast by a Dutch foundryman, Michael Burgerhuys of Middelburg, in 1630 was recovered from the old tolbooth and a clock was designed and manufactured by James Ritchie & Son and installed in the tower in 1858.

The town clerk, Charles Gulland, and other council officers relocated to Bank House, on the opposite side of Back Wynd, in around 1900. The building continued to serve as the meeting place of the burgh council for much of the 20th century but ceased to be the local seat of government when the enlarged North-East Fife District Council was formed in 1975. The first floor of the building was subsequently converted for commercial use and the ground floor, after being used as a post office, was converted for use as a shop.

In 2016, the town hall was used to depict the Inverness County Records Office when it appeared in the television series, Outlander.

== See also ==
- List of listed buildings in Falkland, Fife
- List of Category A listed buildings in Fife
