= Adam Anderson (physicist) =

Scottish physicist

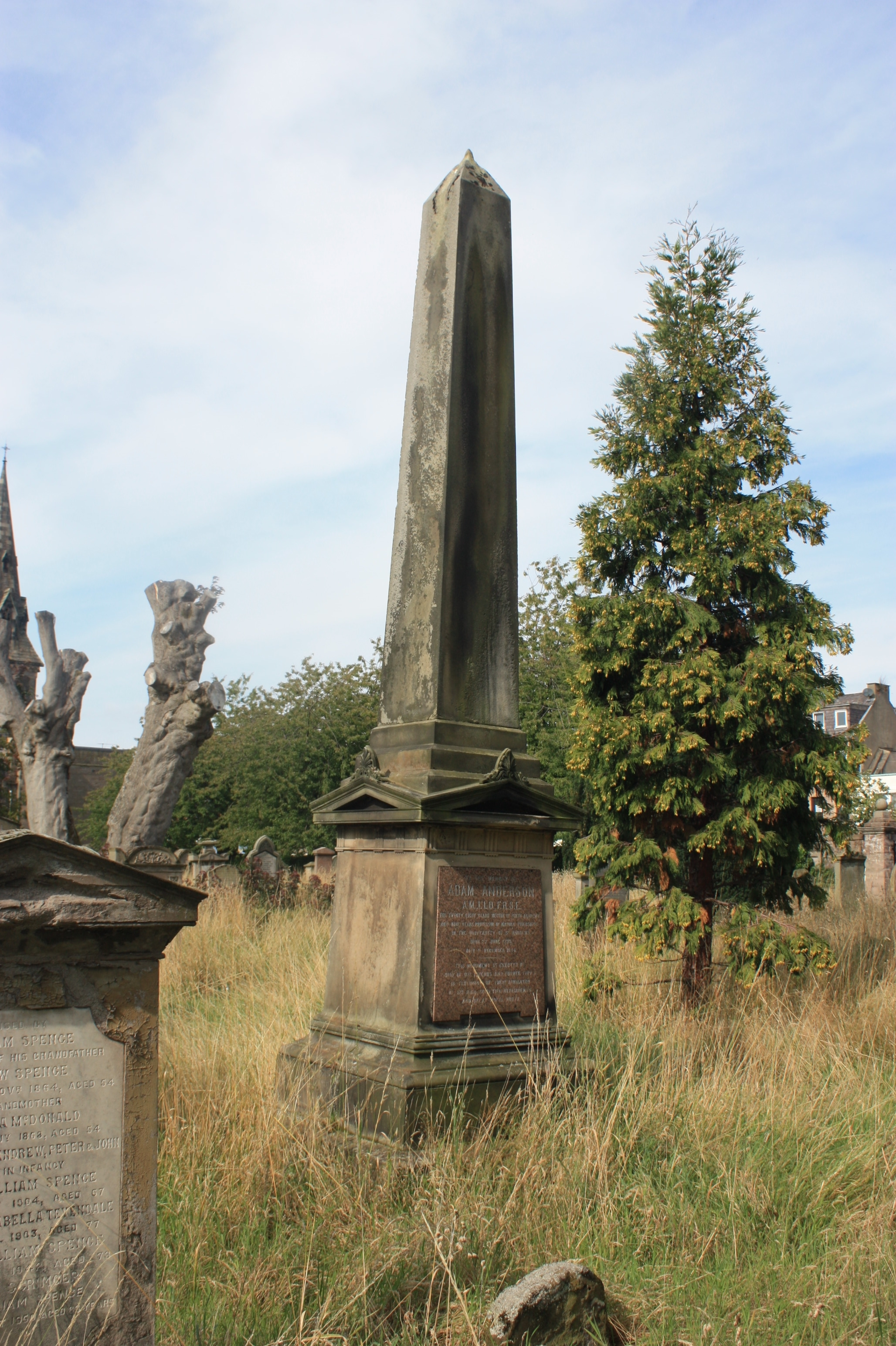
- Anderson's grave, Greyfriars Burial Ground, Perth
- Born: 27 June 1783
- Died: 5 December 1846 (aged 63)
- Occupation: Physicist

Adam Anderson AM LLD FRSE (27 June 1783 – 5 December 1846) was a Scottish physicist and encyclopedist. He was the rector of Perth Academy from 1811 to 1839, and Professor of Natural and Experimental Philosophy 1839 to 1846 at St Andrews University.

Anderson designed and supervised the construction of Perth Water Works and of the royal burgh's gasworks.

He contributed original papers on the measurement of the heights of mountains by the barometer, the hygrometric state of the atmosphere, the dew point, and the illuminating power of coal gas, to Nicholson's Journal, vol. xxx. 1812, to Thomson's Annals of Philosophy, vol. ix. 1817, and to the Edinburgh Philosophical Journal, vols. ii, iv, xi, xii, xiii, &c. The Perth gasworks were originally constructed under his superintendence, and he introduced many improvements leading to the economical production of gas. He wrote the articles "Barometer", "Cold", "Dyeing", "Fermentation", "Evaporation", "Hygrometry", "Navigation", and "Physical Geography" in Brewster's Edinburgh Encyclopædia (completed 1830), and the article "Gaslight" in the Encyclopædia Britannica.

He died on 5 December 1846, aged 63, and is buried in the south-east section of Greyfriars Burial Ground in Perth.
