= St John the Baptist Episcopal Church, Perth =

St John the Baptist Church
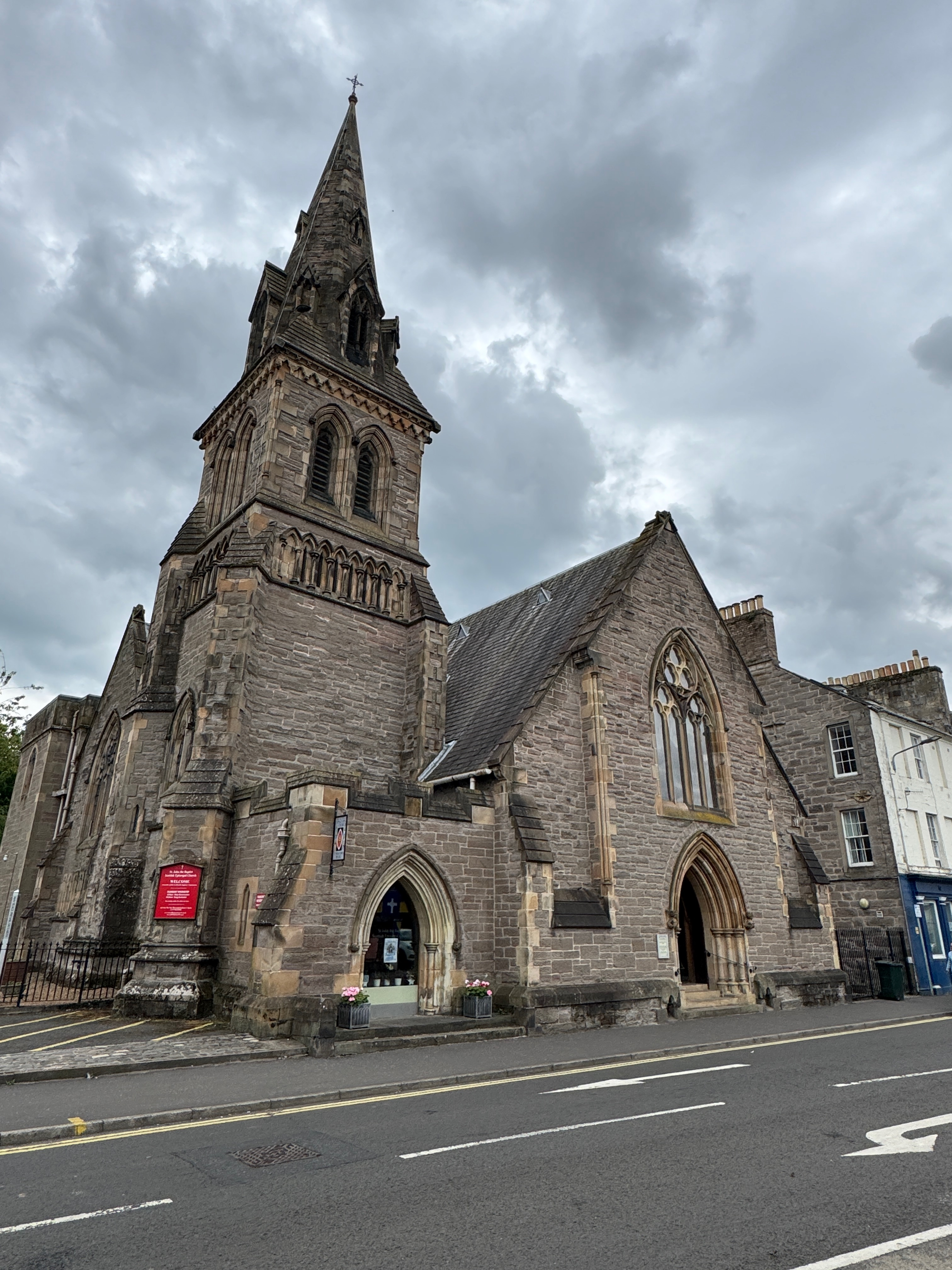
- The building in 2024
- St John the Baptist Church
- 56°23′38″N 3°25′41″W
- Location: Princes Street, Perth, Perth and Kinross
- Country: Scotland
- Denomination: Scottish Episcopalian
- Website: Official website

History
- Status: open
- Dedication: John the Baptist
- Consecrated: 22 October 1851

Architecture
- Functional status: used
- Heritage designation: Category B listed building
- Designated: 26 August 1977
- Architect(s): John Hay; William Hardie Hay; James Murdoch Hay
- Groundbreaking: September 1850
- Completed: June 1851 (175 years ago)

St John the Baptist Church is located in Perth, Perth and Kinross, Scotland. Of Scottish Episcopalian denomination, it is located on Princes Street, at its junction with Canal Street, in the southeastern corner of the city centre. It adjoins the Greyfriars Burial Ground on its western side. Completed in 1851, it is now a Category B listed building. The church's architects were John Hay, William Hardie Hay and James Murdoch Hay, three brothers from Liverpool.

Andrew Granger Heiton, nephew of Andrew Heiton, made additions in 1914.

The site on which the church stands was purchased in 1795, on the condition that a place of worship for Church of England services be its only use. The chapel constructed that year was demolished in 1850 to make way for today's structure.

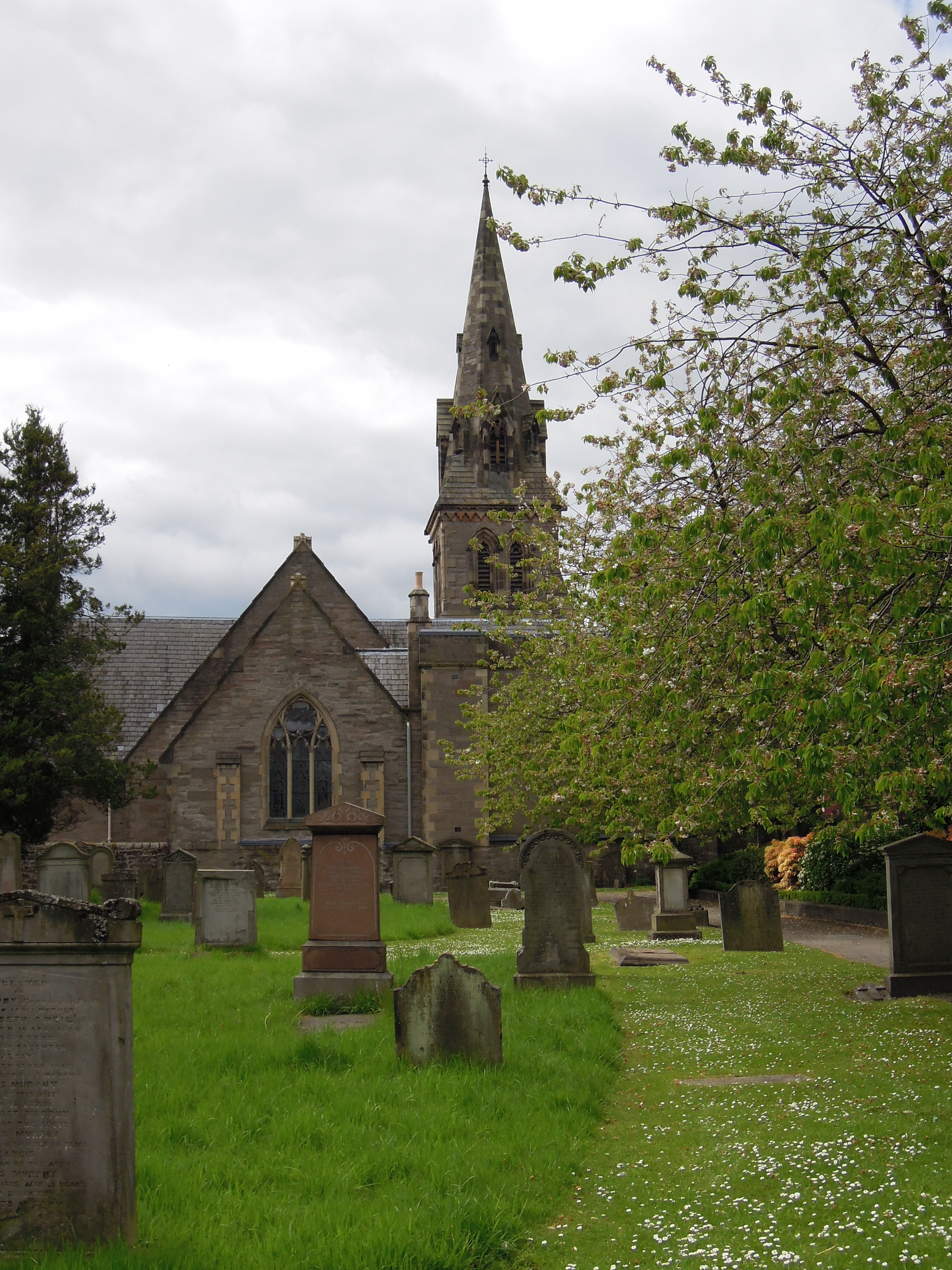
A 2013 view of the church's eastern elevation from the adjacent Greyfriars Burial Ground

== See also ==
- List of listed buildings in Perth, Scotland
