= Scottish Urban Archaeological Trust =

- Abbreviation: SUAT
- Predecessor: Urban Archaeology Unit
- Founded: 9 July 1982 (44 years ago)
- Type: Archaeology
- Headquarters: 55 South Methven Street
- Location: Perth, Scotland
- Coordinates: 56.3959389°N 3.43456652°W
- Region served: Scotland

The Scottish Urban Archaeological Trust (SUAT) is an archaeological company. It was formed in 1982, replacing the Urban Archaeology Unit, itself established four years earlier. Based in Perth, Scotland, the Trust operates the monitoring and excavation of redevelopment in Scotland's medieval burghs.

== Background ==
In the early days of the Trust's existence, large parts of its work was funded through a combination of Manpower Services Commission schemes and funding from SDD Ancient Monuments. After local authorities were reorganised in the 1990s, including the appointment of local-authority archaeologists, the funding for the monitoring project was brought to an end. SUAT shifted its work to concentrate on developed-funded archaeology, along with undertaking funded research projects from Historic Scotland's (now Historic Environment Scotland) archaeology programme.

== Projects ==
In 1997, when proposals were made to dismantle and rebuild the eastern wall of Perth's Greyfriars Burial Ground, two test pits were dug by the Trust. One of the pits found what is believed to be the original monastery wall foundations. A "succession of wall foundations" hinted at several wall replacement and repair efforts undertaken during the monastery's lifespan, each raising the ground level. Medieval pottery was also discovered, likely associated with the soil of lower garden abutting the original monastery wall. The other pit demonstrated a lack of a progression of wall foundations, confirming that that area was inside the 1795 graveyard extension and outside the original monastery grounds. The second pit also showed signs of infilling or levelling layers, possibly from when a burn, which ran along the burial ground's southern wall, was covered with soil.

== Publications ==
- Perth: The Archaeology of the Medieval Town (1984) ISBN 0947544011
