= John Milne (disambiguation) =

John Milne (1850–1913) was a British geologist and mining engineer.

John Milne may also refer to:

== Academia ==
- John M. Milne (1850–1905), head of the institution that is today State University of New York at Geneseo

== Arts and media ==
- John Milne (journalist) (1942–2014), BBC Scotland presenter
- John Clark Milne (1897–1962), Scottish poet
- John Milne (sculptor) (1931–1978), English abstract sculptor

== Sports ==
- Jack Milne (speedway rider) (1907–1995), speedway rider
- Jackie Milne (1911–1959), Scottish international footballer (Arsenal, Middlesbrough)
- John Milne (English footballer) (fl. 1888–1894), English footballer (Bolton Wanderers, Manchester City)

== Military ==
- John Theobald Milne (1895–1917), English fighter pilot and flying ace during the First World War
- John Milne (British Army officer) (born 1946), British Army general

== Politics and law ==
- John Milne (judge) (1929–1993), South African judge
- John Milne (Canadian politician) (1839–1922), Canadian iron moulder, businessman and senator
- John Milne (British politician), British Liberal Democrat MP for Horsham

== Other ==
- John Milne (architect) (1823–1904), Scottish architect

== See also ==
- John Mylne (disambiguation)
