= Brunton House, Falkland =

House in Falkirk, Fife, Scotland

Coordinates: 56°15′09″N 3°12′29″W

Brunton House School
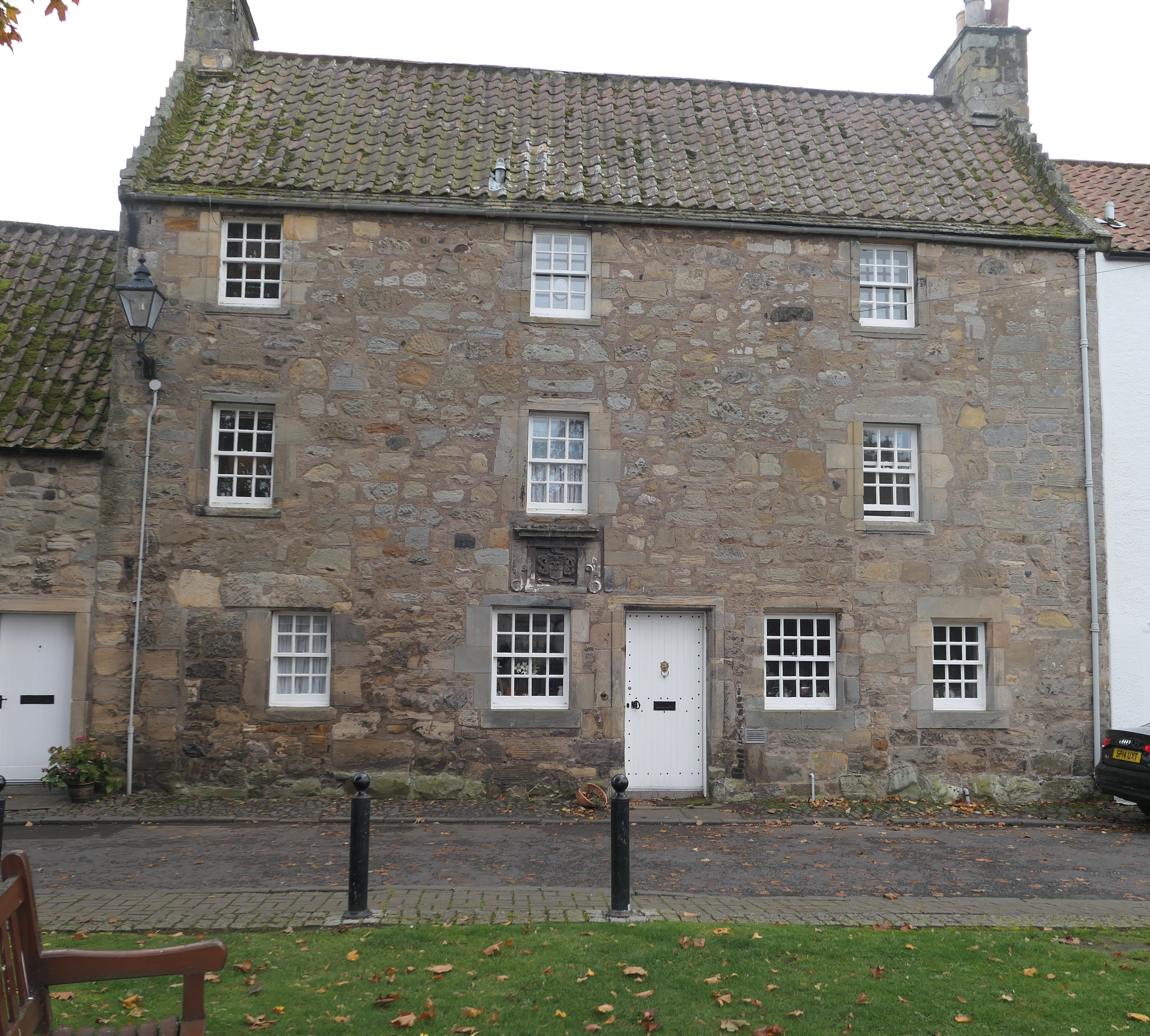

Information
- Religious affiliation(s): Catholic
- Established: 1894
- Founder: John Crichton-Stuart, 3rd Marquess of Bute

Brunton House is a Category A listed building in the village of Falkland in Fife, Scotland. It was formerly the residence of the hereditary falconers to the Kings of Scotland.

It was built by the Sunsons of Brunton, Hereditary Falconers, whose arms are depicted on an armorial panel on the front of the building with the date 1712. It was restored in 1894–95 for the 3rd Marquess of Bute by Robert Weir Schultz as a school for the Roman Catholic children of the village, and restored again in 1970–71 by the National Trust for Scotland.

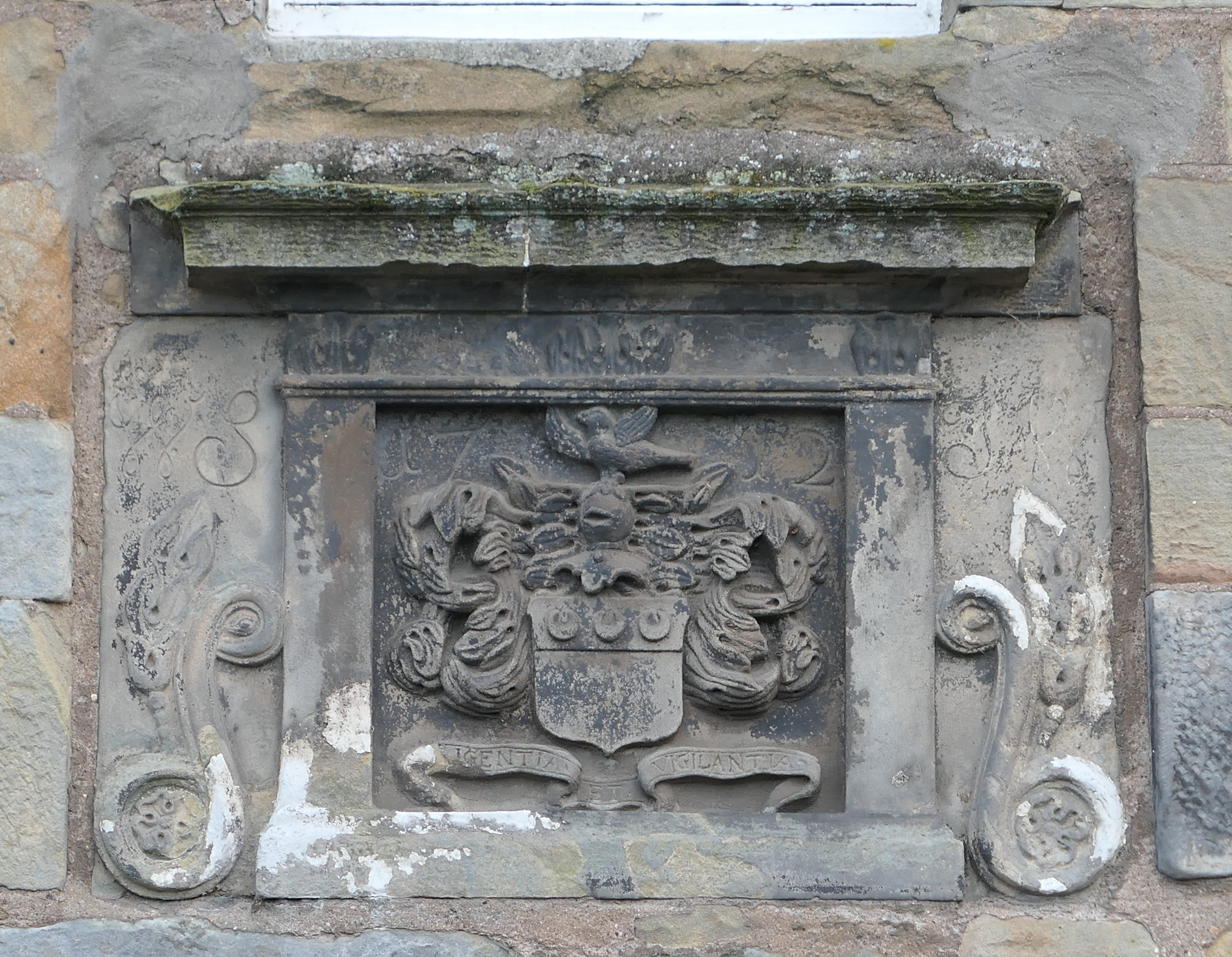
Armorial panel on the front of the house, dated 1712

== See also ==
- Brunton House on the Falkland Historic Buildings website
