= John Mylne (died 1657) =

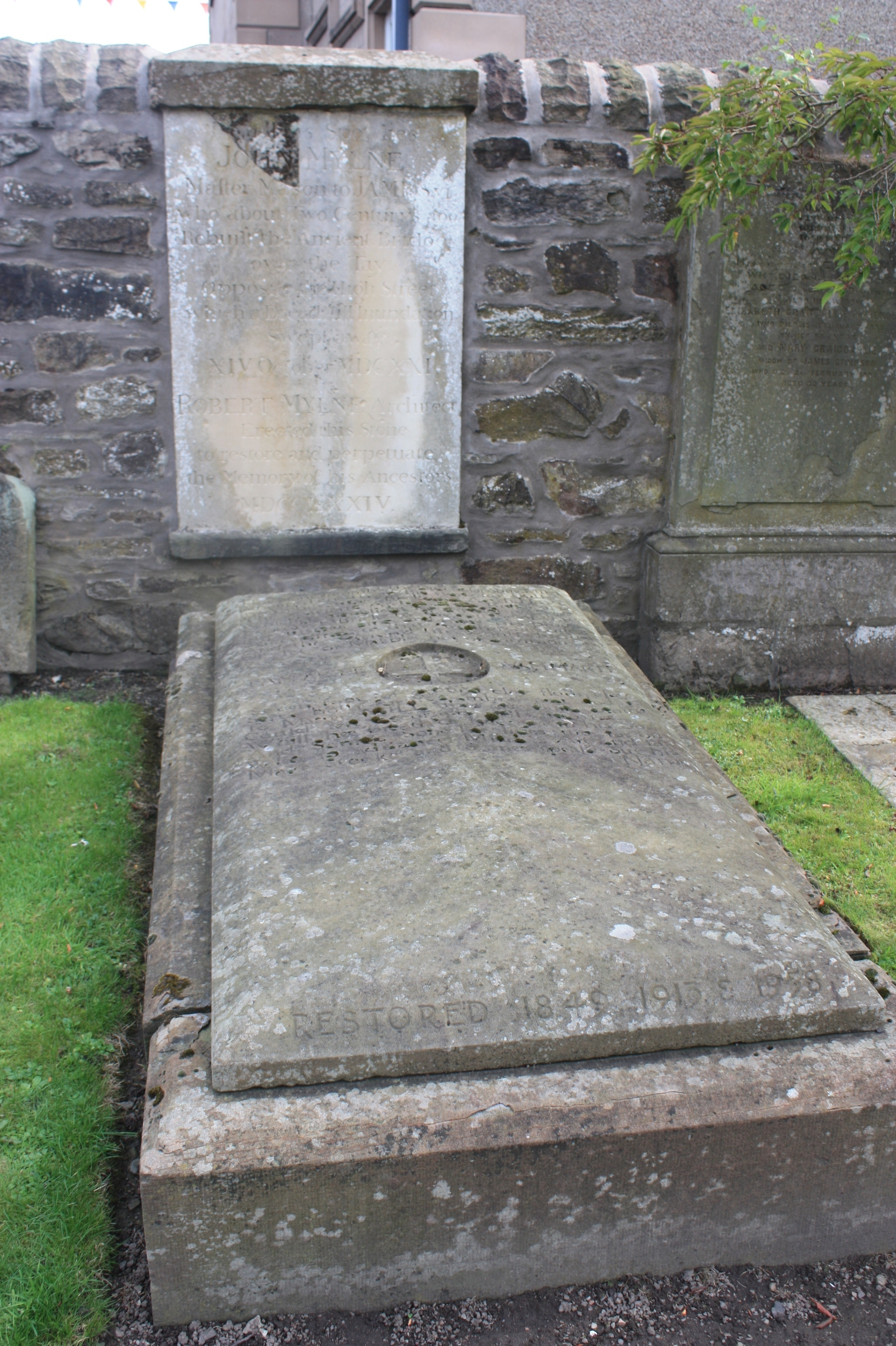
John Mylne's grave, Greyfriars Burial Ground, Perth

John Mylne of Perth (c. 1585 – 1657) was a Scottish master mason who served as Master Mason to the Crown of Scotland. He was born in Perth, the son of John Mylne, also a master mason, and Helen Kenneries.

He married Isobel Wilson in 1610 and had two sons, John and Alexander, both of whom followed him into the building profession, and a daughter, Barbara, who was later accused of witchcraft in Edinburgh.

He learned his craft through assisting his father on his Tay Bridge construction project at Perth. In 1616 he was invited to Edinburgh to work on a statue of James VI for the Netherbow Port, or city gate, after the previous mason, Frenchman Benjamin Lambert, had died before completing the commission. Mylne also rebuilt the mercat cross in the High Street, and was made a burgess of Edinburgh in June 1617. In 1620 he was contracted to build a new church at Falkland in Fife for David Murray, Lord Scone. The contract stipulated that the church was to be built precisely to Lord Scone's specifications, and left Mylne little room for architectural input. Between 1622 and 1629 he built the tolbooth steeple in Aberdeen, and was rewarded by being made a burgess of that royal burgh in May 1622. In 1627 he was further made a burgess of Dundee in right of his father. Following this he carried out alterations to Drummond House for David Drummond, Earl of Perth, which included the sundial in the grounds.

On the death of William Wallace in 1631, Mylne was appointed Master Mason to the Crown, and returned to Edinburgh. His first royal commission came shortly before this, in 1629, when he was tasked with the construction of a large pond at the palace of Holyroodhouse. With the assistance of his two sons, he also erected a large polyhedral sundial at Holyrood for Charles I, on the occasion of his Scottish coronation in 1633. The sundial, which bears numerous Stuart emblems, is the earliest surviving polyhedral example in the country. Mylne was paid £408 15s 6d (Scots) for the work. He held his royal post for five years, before resigning it in favour of his eldest son John in 1636, when he left Edinburgh.

In 1643 Mylne was made a burgess of Kirkcaldy, following his work to repair and enlarge the parish kirk. Over the following years he was engaged on several public works in Dundee, including the church steeple, tolbooth, and the royal burgh's fortifications.

Mylne was also a prominent Freemason, a member of the Lodge of Edinburgh from 1633, and Master of the Lodge of Scone from 1621 to 1627.

He is buried against the southern wall of Greyfriars Burial Ground in Perth, close to the southern pedestrian gate. The stone was erected by Robert Mylne and has been restored many times.
