= Falkland, Fife =

Coordinates: 56.25°N 3.20°W

Falkland
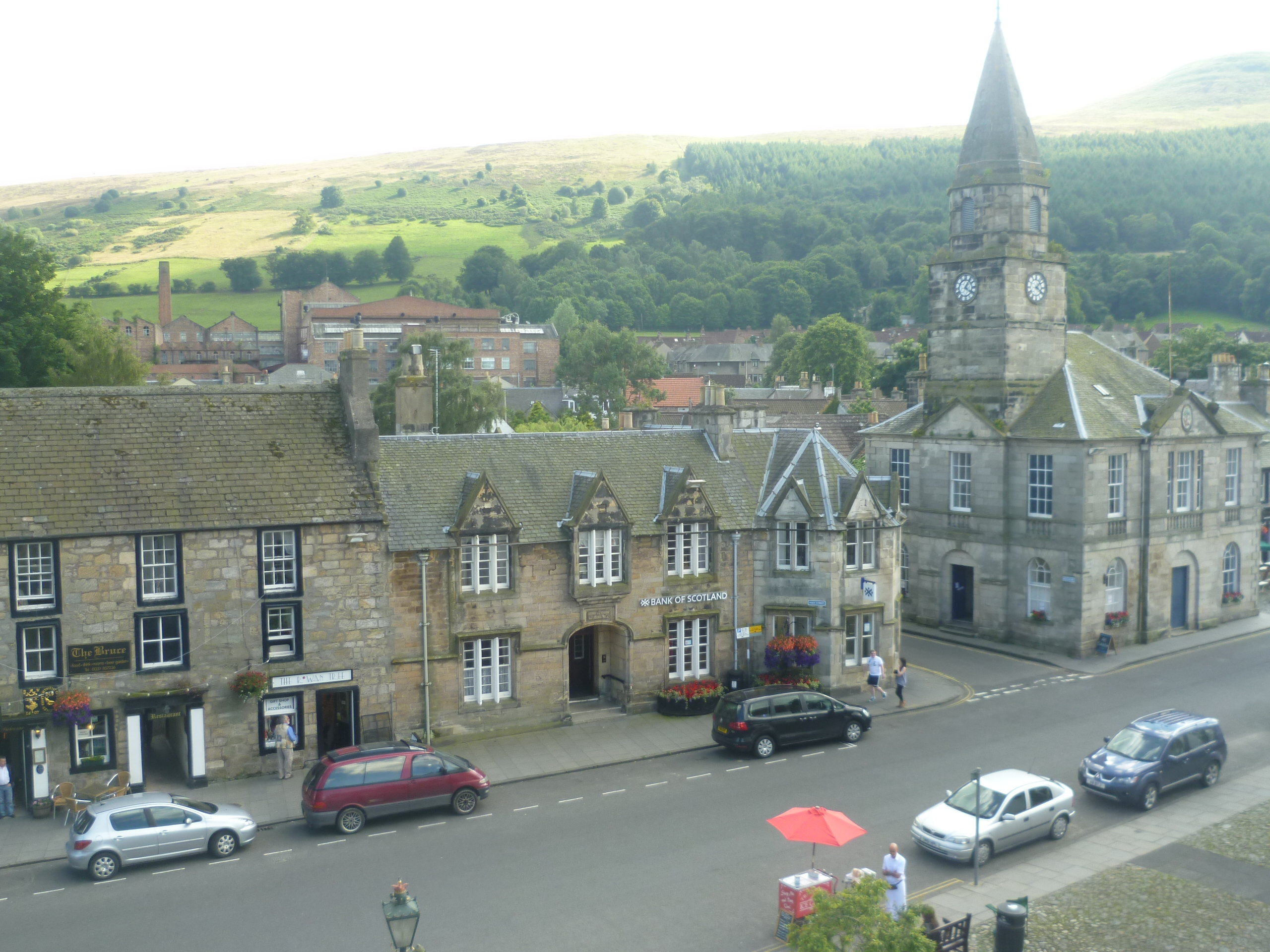
- Falkland from the Palace

- Location within Fife
- Population: 1,041 (2022)
- OS grid reference: NO253077
- Community council: Falkland & Newton of Falkland
- Council area: Fife
- Lieutenancy area: Fife
- Country: Scotland
- Sovereign state: United Kingdom
- Post town: CUPAR
- Postcode district: KY15
- Dialling code: 01337
- Police: Scotland
- Fire: Scottish
- Ambulance: Scottish
- UK Parliament: North East Fife
- Scottish Parliament: North East Fife

Falkland is a village, parish, and former royal burgh in Fife, Scotland, at the foot of the Lomond Hills. According to the 2022 census it has a population of 1,041.

== Etymology ==
The earliest forms of this name include Falleland (c. 1128) and Falecklen (c. 1160). The second element is the Scottish Gaelic lann (enclosure) or possibly its Pictish cognate, but the exact etymology is unclear. The first element could be the Gaelic falach (hidden), failc (wash), or falc (heavy rain). The later folk etymologies of "falcon land" and "folkland" are not plausible.

In the Middle Ages, the name Falkland applied only to the Castle; the burgh and parish were known as Kilgour, which may mean "church/cell of Gabrán".

== History ==
The lands of Kilgour existed in the Falkland area prior to the 12th century. But, the erection of Falkland Castle some time after 1160 was the crucial factor in the development of the medieval village, with workers and artisans. When King Malcolm donated the royal hunting estate of Falkland to Duncan, Earl of Fife in 1160, any previous hunting lodge may have been replaced by the castle. The site of Falkland Castle now lies within the grounds of the present Falkland Palace.

The church of Kilgour was located to the west of the present town. The benefice was counted as part of the Priory of Saint Andrews. It is known that an African servant of hers were buried in the kirk yard there in July 1591. The benefice was counted as part of the Priory of Saint Andrews. It is known that coffins were interred at a spot called the "Pillars of Hercules" on the way to Kilgour.

About thirty years later, a replacement church was built in Falkland town by the master mason John Mylne and his son. The site of the old church at Kilgour has been absorbed into a farm.

Despite being granted royal burgh status in 1458, Falkland had developed as a medieval settlement dependent on Falkland Castle and Falkland Palace. Thus it did not function in the same way as did other royal burghs.

Falkland was the birthplace of the famous 17th-century Covenanter Richard Cameron. He was the town schoolmaster before he became a field or itinerant preacher. His house still stands in the main street of the village. Another Covenanter, Robert Gillespie, was arrested for preaching here; he was imprisoned on the Bass Rock.

John, Marquis of Bute, inherited much of this land in the late 19th century. He employed the architects John Kinross and Robert Weir Schultz to restore a considerable proportion of the village (including the Palace).

== Legacy ==
- The Falkland Islands in the South Atlantic are named after Anthony Cary, 5th Viscount Falkland.
- The 20th-century American country and western singer Johnny Cash, born to a poor farming family in Arkansas, traced part of his paternal family ancestry to this district of Fife.
- Today, the parish church of Falkland is a Destination Hub on the St Margaret Pilgrim Journey.

== Landmarks ==
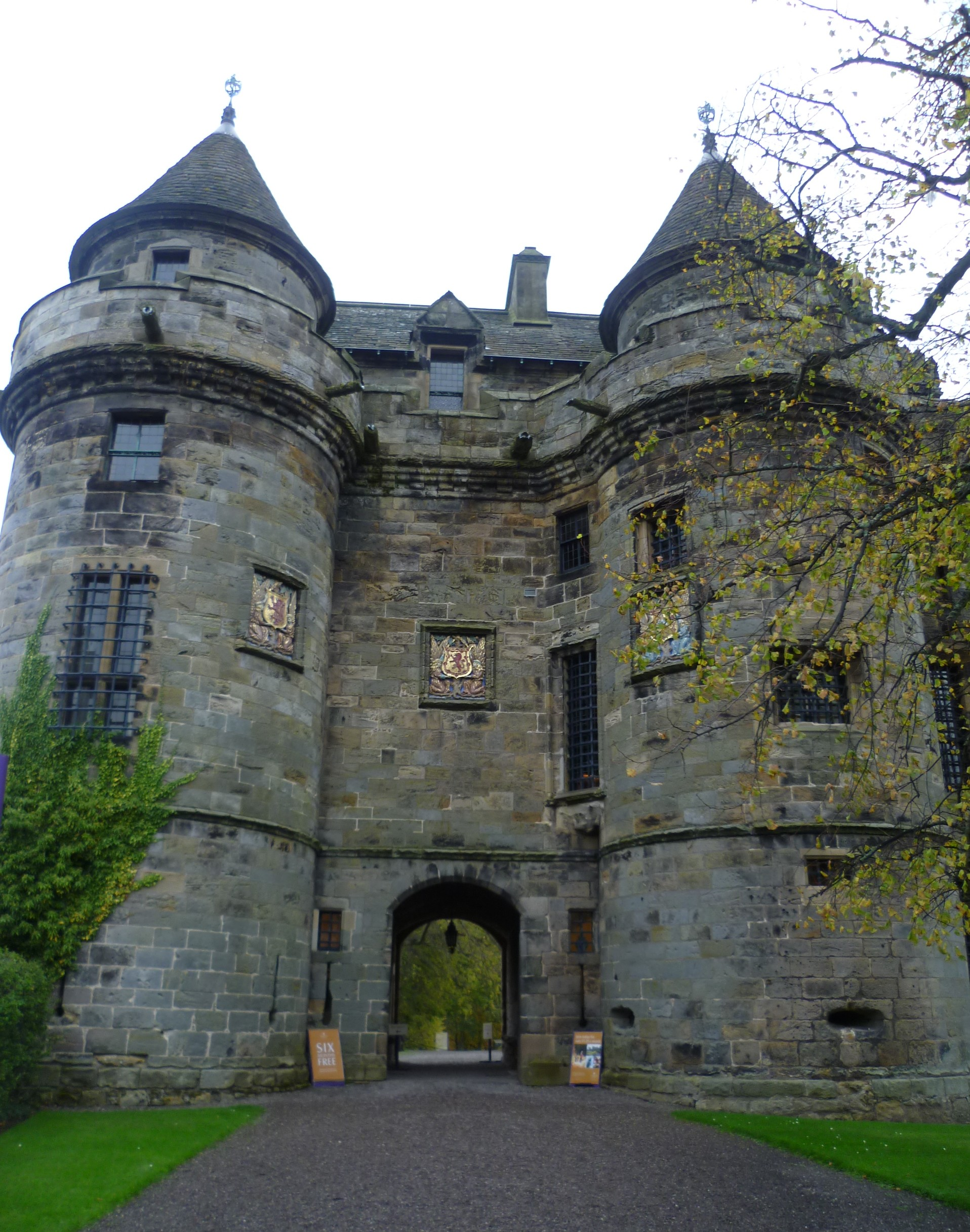
The gatehouse at Falkland Palace

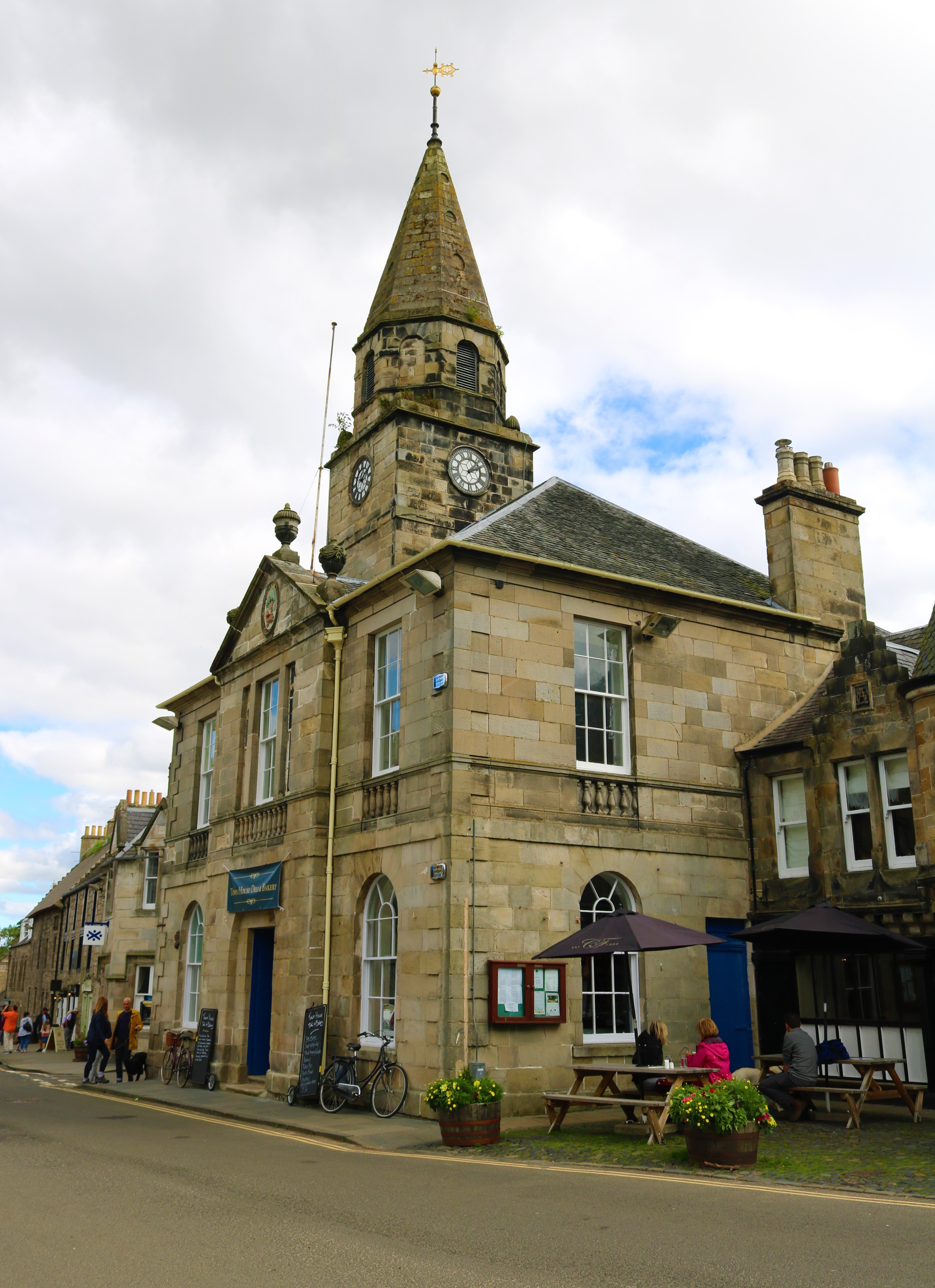
Falkland Town Hall

Scotland's first conservation village is best known as the location of Falkland Palace, begun in 1500 by James IV, and the best example of French-influenced Renaissance architecture in Scotland. The palace was built to accommodate the royal court when they came to Falkland to hunt in the nearby forests; Mary, Queen of Scots, was a frequent visitor. The palace houses a Roman Catholic church which was used for the undertaking of mass.

As at Holyrood Palace in Edinburgh, a fire broke out during the occupation of the buildings by Oliver Cromwell's troops in 1654. The fire destroyed the East Range. The Court never returned to Falkland Palace after 1665 and until the 19th century the village and palace were neglected. In the late 19th century extensive rebuilding and restoration work began. Today the palace and gardens are open to the public through the National Trust for Scotland.

Falkland Parish Church was designed by William Burn and built between 1848 and 1850, replacing a previous church on the site.

Falkland contains a number of Listed buildings, including five at Category A:

- Falkland Palace (also its royal stables and tennis court)
- The House of Falkland
- Falkland Town Hall
- Moncrief House
- Brunton House

== Culture ==
Other features of the village include an old horse market, also including the Falkland Cricket Club, and the Falkland Golf Club. One of the country's leading environmental festivals, The Big Tent, was held for several years up to 2012 in the grounds of Falkland Estate in July. Organised by the Falkland Centre for Stewardship, the 2012 festival was headlined by the Proclaimers and the 2010 event by Rosanne Cash. Since 2016 the main event of the year has been the Craft Symposium. The 2018 Symposium, held in August, celebrates traditional crafts and craftsmanship through talks, discussions, workshops, demonstrations, networking and site tours.

The Falkland Library and Falkland Community Hall are run on behalf of the community by Falkland Community Development Trust, an organisation established to maintain, develop and/or operate a centre or centres providing facilities for a wide range of community activities and accommodation for community groups, and for public sector agencies which provide services of benefit to the community. All residents of Falkland can become members of the trust.

The Falkland Society holds regular meetings with speakers, and has published several books about the village.

== Sport ==
Falkland has one of the oldest real tennis courts, which was built for James V of Scotland in 1539. It is the oldest tennis court in use today, and the only active tennis court without a roof. Play is organized by the Falkland Palace Royal Tennis Club.

Forming in 1860, Falkland Cricket Club are the oldest cricket club in Fife. The club have played at Scroggie Park since 1948.

The earliest known reference to golf at Falkland is from 1503, when King James IV played golf with the Earl of Bothwell while staying at Falkland Palace.

Falkland Trail Runners organise the Falkland Hill trail race in conjunction with the annual village gala.

== Notable residents ==
- Rev George Buist (1779-1860) Moderator of the General Assembly of the Church of Scotland in 1848 was minister of Falkland 1802 to 1813.
- Sir David Deas, born and raised in Falkland
- Emelia Geddie (1665–1681), Presbyterian child prophet, born in Falkland
