= Perth Water Works =

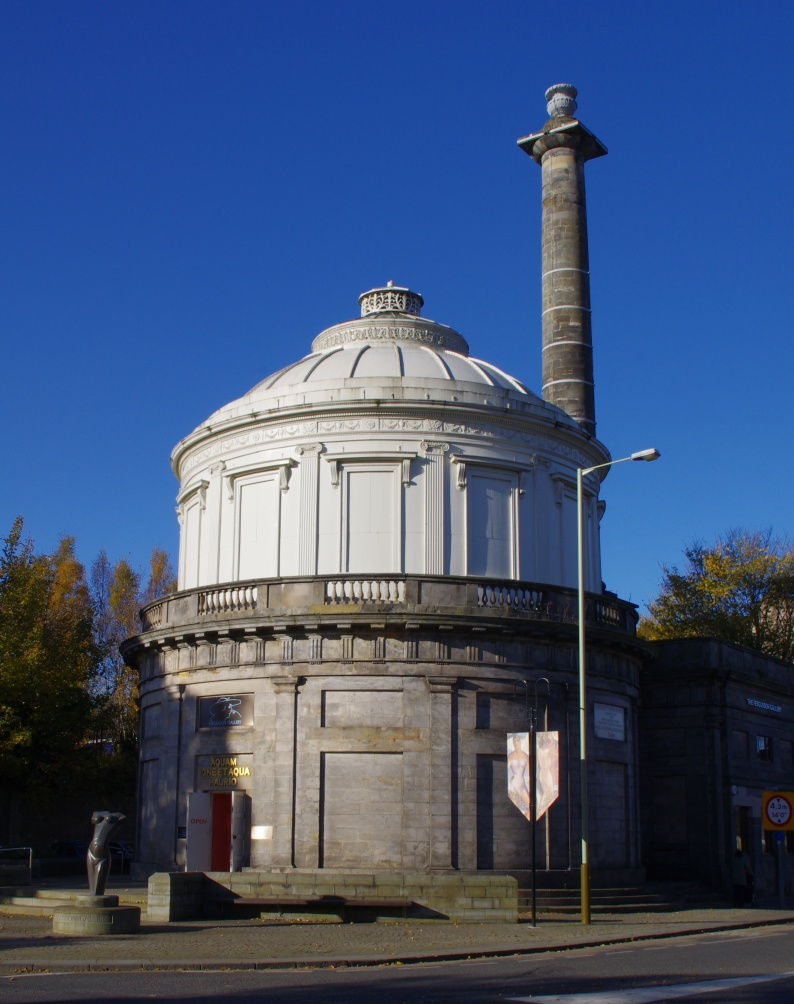
- The building in 2012

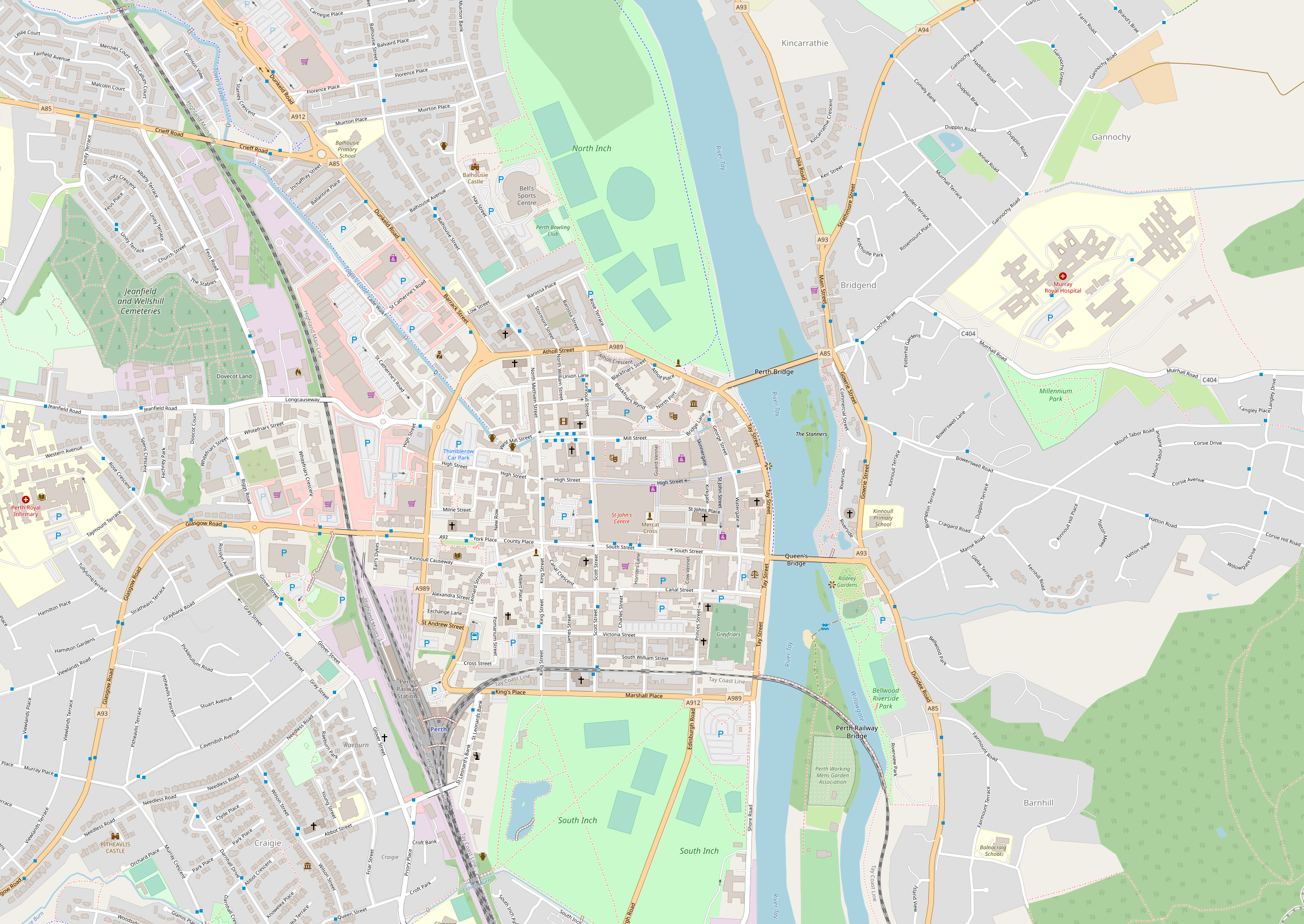
- Shown in Perth
- 56.392282°N 3.426454°W
- Location: Marshall Place, Perth, Scotland

History
- Built: 1832 (194 years ago)

Site notes
- Architect: Adam Anderson
- Architectural style: Neo-classical

Listed Building – Category A
- Designated: 20 May 1965
- Reference no.: LB39341

Perth Water Works (also known as Corporation Water Works) is an historic building in Perth, Scotland, dating to 1832. Standing at the corner of Tay Street and Marshall Place (both part of the A989), the building is a former engine house, water tank and art gallery. It was the home of The Fergusson Gallery, displaying the work of John Duncan Fergusson, since 1992. The collection has now been relocated to Perth Art Gallery, though a sculpture remains outside.

The building is Category A listed. Historic Environment Scotland states that it is one of Scotland's most significant industrial buildings, and that its large-scale cast-iron construction may be the first very first in the world.

Clean water was drawn from filter beds on Moncreiffe Island, in the adjacent River Tay, and pumped beneath the river, by a steam engine, into a 146,000 imperial gallons (660,000 L; 175,000 US gal) holding tank in the building's rotunda.

The building's architect was Adam Anderson, the rector of Perth Academy.

An inscription over the door in the rotunda reads Aquam Igne Et Aqua Haurio ("I draw water by fire and water").

The engine house has a tall Doric columned chimney, capped by a Roman urn (a fibreglass replica of the original, which was destroyed by a lightning strike in 1871).

The building became surplus to requirements in 1965, when the city opened a new water works. It was restored in 1973, for use as a Tourist Information Centre, by James Morris and Robert Steedman, and then converted to its current use nineteen years later. Its dome was reconstructed in 2003 as part of a restoration funded by the Heritage Lottery, Historic Scotland and Perth and Kinross Council.

== Gallery ==
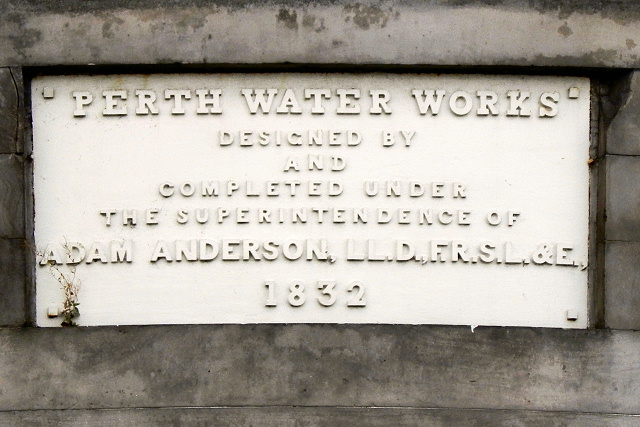
Plaque

== See also ==
- List of listed buildings in Perth, Scotland
