= John Mylne (died 1621) =

Scottish stonemason (died 1621)

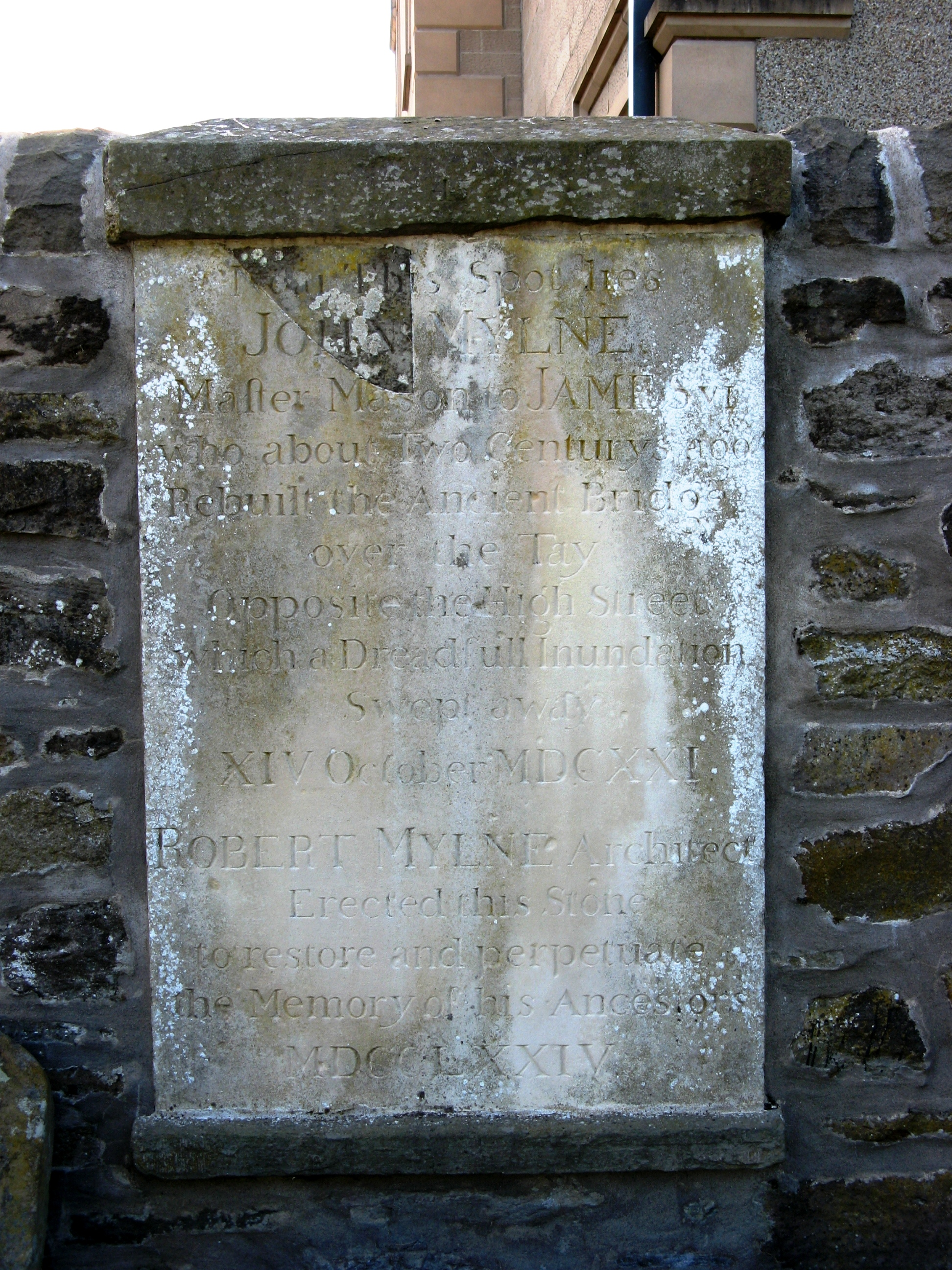
Memorial in Greyfriars Burial Ground, commemorating John Mylne's work on the bridge at Perth

John Mylne (died 1621) was a Scottish master mason, the first of three successive generations of the name to serve as Master Mason to the Crown of Scotland. He was born in Dundee into a family of master builders. His great-grandfather, also John (died 1513), had been Master Mason to both James III and James IV. He was the son of Thomas Mylne (d. 1605), Master Mason to the Crown and burgess of Dundee. His grandfather may have been Robert Mylne (d. 1549) former provost of Dundee.

Mylne was well established as a mason by the 1580s. He was made a burgess of Dundee in 1587 for various works in the city, and in particular his renewing of the royal burgh's harbour. He also built the mercat cross which formerly stood in the High Street. In 1584-5 he was engaged on alterations to The Drum, a tower house in Lothian, for the 7th Lord Somerville. In 1589 he built or extended Bannatyne House in Newtyle, Angus, for justice Thomas Bannatyne. Mylne was Master of the Mason's Lodge at Scone at a time when the mason's lodges were moving away from being simply craft guilds, and he admitted King James VI to the lodge as a Freeman Mason.

From 1604 to 1617 Mylne was engaged planning and executing an eleven-arched bridge across the River Tay at Perth. Mylne was made a burgess of Perth in 1607, although his bridge was destroyed by a flood in October 1621, just four years after completion, and shortly after Mylne's death. In 1620 he was engaged by the Laird of Scone to build a new church at Falkland, which he worked on with the assistance of his son until his death.

Mylne married Helen Kinnereis, or Kenneries, and had one recorded child, his son John. He died in early 1621, and was buried in Greyfriars Burial Ground in Perth, where his monument, including a 1774 tablet added by his descendant Robert Mylne, still stands.

== Bibliography ==
- Dictionary of National Biography, Oxford University Press, 1921–22.
- Colvin, Howard (1978) A Biographical Dictionary of British Architects 1600–1840. 4th edition, Yale University Press, ISBN 978-0-300-12508-5.
- Howard, Deborah (1995) Architecture of Scotland: Reformation to Restoration, 1560-1660, Edinburgh University Press.
- "Bannatyne House, Newtyle". Angus Historic Monuments Record.
