= Hansína Regína Björnsdóttir =

Icelandic photographer

- Born: 6 June 1884; Eskifjörður, Iceland
- Died: 5 February 1973 (aged 88); Djúpivogur, Iceland
- Burial place: Churchyard in Djúpivogur
- Other name: H. Eiríksson
- Occupation: photographer
- Years active: 1903-1950s
- Relatives: Hans Jonatan (great-grandfather)

Hansína Regína Björnsdóttir (6 June 1884 – 5 February 1973) was an Icelandic photographer, whose main body of works were signed with the name H. Eiríksson. Her archive of photographic works is held by the National Museum of Iceland.

== Early life ==
Hansína Regína Björnsdóttir was born on 6 June 1884 in Eskifjörður, Iceland to Susanna Sophie (née Weywadt) and Björn Eiríksson. She was one of eight children born into the family and raised by her mother, who ran the household and the dairy, while her father was a woodwright. She was the great-granddaughter of Hans Jonatan, originally from Saint Croix in the Danish West Indies. Jonatan had been taken by his mistress Henrietta Catharina Schimmelmann to Copenhagen and, after losing a lawsuit to gain his freedom, became runaway slave, fleeing to Iceland. Jonatan is the first known immigrant in Iceland of African descent and his marriage with Katrín Antoníusdóttir produced two children, Lúðvík Stefán and Hansína Regína, who would marry Eiríkur Eiríksson.

When she was four years old, Hansína went to live with her mother Susanna's sister, Nicoline Weywadt on the family homestead Teigarhorn, near Djúpivogur. Weywadt taught Hansína photography and sent her for further studies in Copenhagen. Completing her education in 1903, the same year her mother died, Hansína returned to Teigarhorn.

== Career ==
Hansína took over the studio of her aunt, which she operated until 1911. That year, she married Jón Kristján Lúðvíksson with whom she would have five children. For a while she stopped taking photographs, but resumed her career, using the professional name H. Eiríksson. Due to an accident, some of her work was destroyed, but what remains are images of people and the landscapes around Berufjörður.

== Death and legacy ==
Hansína died on 5 February 1973 and was buried at the churchyard in Djúpivogur. In 1981, the National Museum of Iceland purchased 1,200 plates and tools which she worked with. In addition, the archive included albums containing photographs made by Weywadt.
