= Berufjarðará =

River in Iceland

Coordinates: 64°47′28″N 14°30′05″W

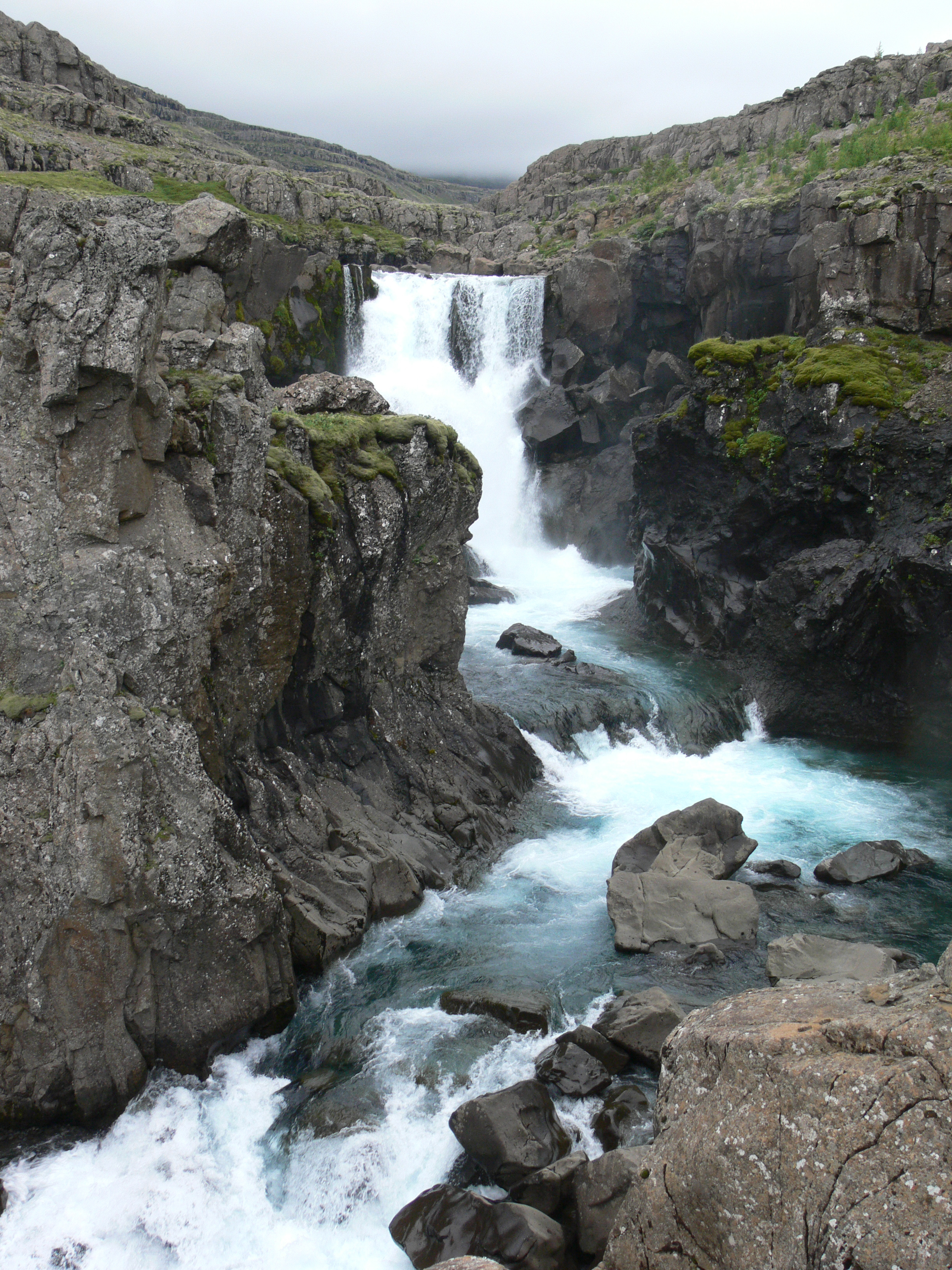
Berufjarðará

Berufjarðará (Icelandic pronunciation: [ˈpɛːrʏˌfjarðarˌauː]) is a river in the East Fjords region of Iceland.

It rises in the highlands near the Öxi [ˈœksɪ] pass, and flows for about 10 km in a south-easterly direction to the bay Fossarvík [ˈfɔsːarˌviːk] (about 20 km NW of Djúpivogur) where it flows into the Berufjörður, the fjord from which its name ("river of Berufjörður") is derived. Its source is west of the farm of Staðareyri [ˈstaːðarˌeiːrɪ] (latitude: 64.7892° or 64°47'21" north; longitude: -14.5055° or 14°30'20" west).

The river has a number of small waterfalls near its mouth, which explains the name of Fossarvík ("bay of waterfalls").

Route 939 follows the river for much of its course.
