= Nicoline Weywadt =

Icelandic photographer

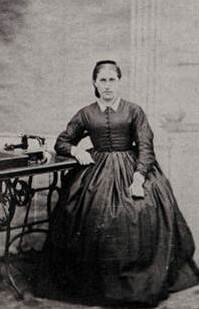
- Born: February 5, 1848; Djúpivogur
- Died: February 20, 1921 (aged 73)
- Known for: photography

Nicoline Marie Elise Weywadt (1848–1921) was the first woman in Iceland to have studied and practised photography. On returning from her studies in Copenhagen, she managed the Teigarhorn farmhouse built by her father in Djúpavogshreppur. She built her own photographic atelier where she worked for many years.

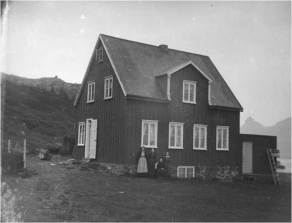
The Teigarhorn house photographed by Nicoline Weywadt

== Biography ==
Born on 5 February 1848 in Djúpivogur, Nicoline Marie Elise Weywadt was the second oldest of the 14 children of Niels Peter Emil Weywadt (1814–1883), a director with Ørum & Wulff, and his wife Sophie Brochdorf (1826–1902). In 1880, the family moved to the house Niels Weywadt had built at Teigarhorn.

Nicoline Weywadt studied photography and mineralogy in Copenhagen, graduating in 1872 and becoming the first Icelandic woman to master photography. On her return to Iceland, she established a photographic studio in Djúpivogur, the first in eastern Iceland. After her father died in 1883, she took over the Teigarhorn premises and added a photography workshop. All in all, Nicoline worked in photography for some 30 years. She trained her niece, Hansína Regína Björnsdóttir (1884–1973), as her assistant. (Hansina graduated in photography in Copenhagen in 1902.) In 1888, Nicoline returned to Copenhagen to gain experience in dry-plate photography. In about 1903, she left Hansina in charge of the studio.

Nicoline Weywadt died on 20 February 1921.
