= Hans Jonatan =

One of the first people of colour in Iceland

- Born: 12 April 1784; Constitution Hill, Saint Croix, Danish West Indies
- Died: 18 December 1827 (aged 43); Borgargarður, Djúpivogur, Iceland
- Occupations: Escaped slave, soldier, farmer, trader
- Known for: First known person of African descent in Iceland; First person to have his genome reconstructed without use of physical remains
- Relatives: Hansína Regína Björnsdóttir (great-granddaughter)

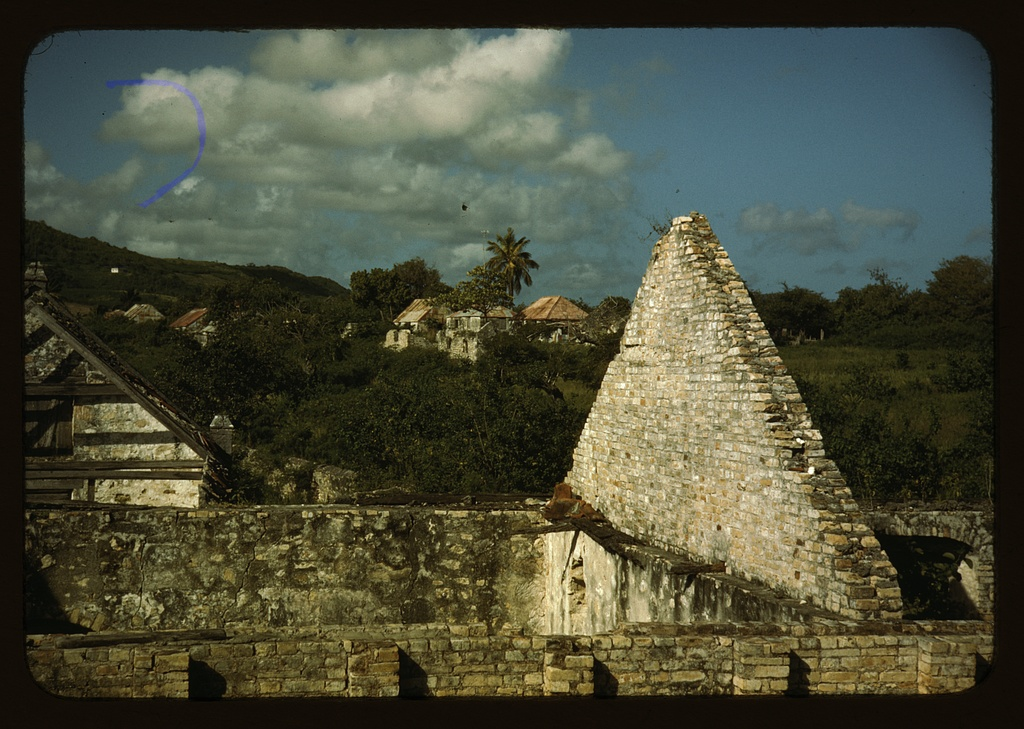
Ruins of an old sugar mill, with a plantation house in the background, Frederiksted 1941.

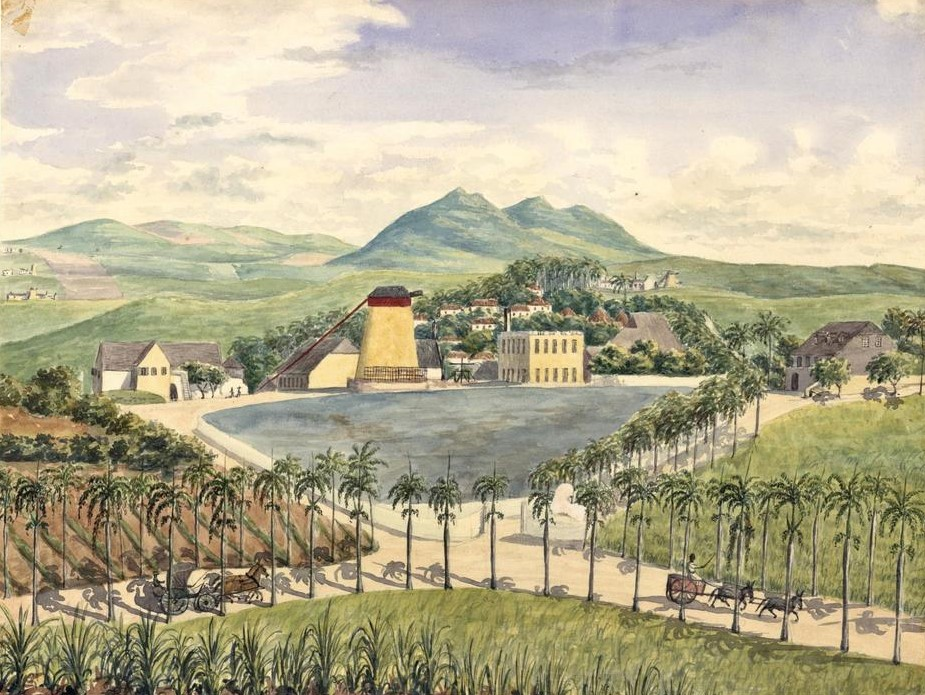
Constitution Hill Plantation Christiansted, St. Croix painting by Frederik von Scholten.

Hans Jonatan (12 April 1784 – 18 December 1827; also known as Hans Jónatan and Hans Jonathan) was an escaped slave, soldier, farmer and trader. His father may have been a white Dane; his mother was a black slave. Following his participation in the Battle of Copenhagen, after which he was initially given his freedom, he became the subject of a test case in Danish law on slavery. Fleeing to Iceland, he became the first known person of African descent to settle in the country. Later, he became the subject of a DNA study.

== Parents ==
Hans Jonatan was born enslaved on the plantation of Constitution Hill on the island of St Croix in the Caribbean, which had become a Danish colony in 1733 when purchased by the Danish West India Company from France. His paternity is uncertain, but Pálsson argues in his biography that his father was a white Dane, Hans Gram, who was the secretary of his owners for three years; his mother was Emilia Regina, a black 'house slave' who is first recorded in 1773 at the St Croix plantation of La Reine, where she was presumably born. In 1788, Emilia had a daughter, Anna Maria, this time by a black man, Andreas, who at the time was a house slave too; but their fates are not recorded. The details of the West African ancestry of Hans's mother were unknown prior to a genetic study.

Hans Jonatan was enslaved by Heinrich Ludvig Ernst von Schimmelmann and his wife Henriette Catharina.

== Life in Denmark ==
In 1789 the Schimmelmann family moved to Copenhagen as the plantation business took a downturn, bringing Emilia Regina and, later, Hans Jonatan with them. Not long afterwards, Heinrich died, bequeathing Hans to his widow Henriette Catharine. In 1801, at the age of seventeen, Hans Jonatan escaped and joined the Danish Navy. He participated in the Battle of Copenhagen, for which he received recognition. Danish crown prince Frederick gave him his freedom as a reward.

Subsequently, Henriette had Jonatan arrested, claiming that he was her property and that she had intended to sell him in the West Indies. Jonatan and his lawyer argued before a Copenhagen court under judge Anders Sandøe Ørsted (who would later become Prime Minister of Denmark) that although slavery was still legal in the Danish West Indies, it was illegal in Denmark and Hans Jonatan could not be kept as a slave. However, in the case Generalmajorinde Henriette de Schimmelmann contra mulatten Hans Jonatan 1802, Ørsted sentenced him on 31 March 1802, to be returned to the West Indies.

== Life in Iceland ==
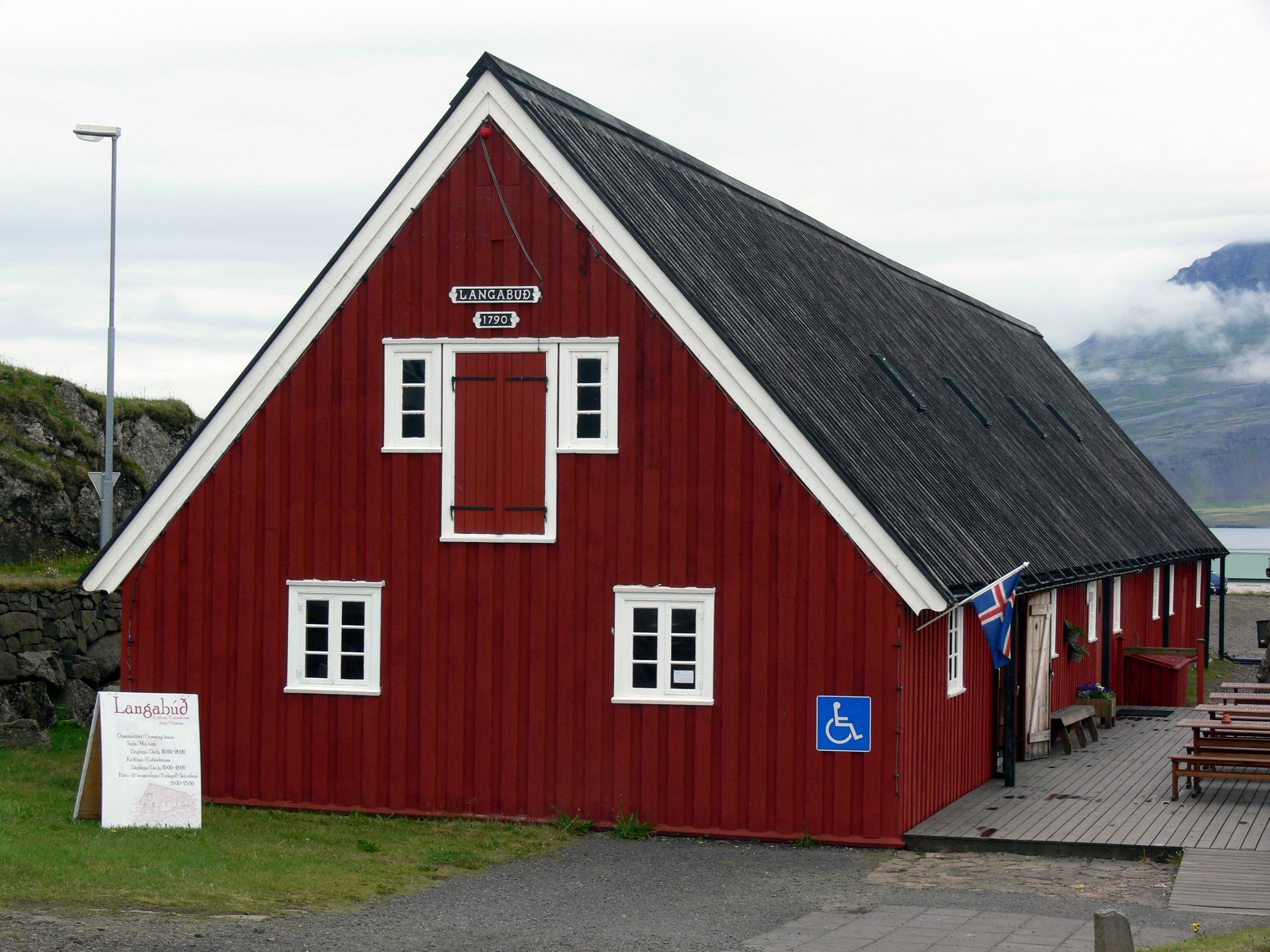
Djúpivogur's trading station, where Hans Jonatan worked.

Hans Jonatan escaped again, and his fate remained unknown to the Danish administration. It was only around the 1990s that the rest of his story was pieced together and started to become generally known. In 1802, he arrived in Djúpivogur in Iceland. One of the first records of Hans Jonatan after 1802 is in the diary of the Norwegian cartographer Hans Frisak it

for 4 August 1812:

The agent at the trading post here is from the West Indies, and has no surname ... but calls himself Hans Jonatan. He is very dark-skinned and has coal-black, curly hair. His father is European but his mother a negro.

Frisak hired Hans Jonatan as a guide. Hans lived as a peasant farmer at Borgargarður working at the Danish trading station in Djúpivogur. He took over the running of the trading post in 1819. By February 1820, Hans had married Katrín Antoníusdóttir from Háls on the Eyjafjörður. They had three children; two survived childhood, and their living descendants now number over a thousand. Hans Jonatan died on 18 December 1827.

== Genetic study ==
In 2018, scientists achieved a genetic breakthrough when they reconstructed a part of his genome solely using samples from his descendants and none from his remains. This was the first time that a human genome had been reconstructed without using physical remains. For the study, 788 of his descendants were identified, and DNA samples from 182 family members were taken. The study was aided by the extreme rarity of African heritage in Iceland, the homogeneity of the country's population, and its comprehensive genealogical database. The samples were analyzed against known signs of African DNA, recreating about 38% of his mother's DNA profile and thus 19% of his own. It was determined that his mother's ancestral origins were from a region now encompassing Nigeria, Benin, and Cameroon.

Despite the popular tale of former prime minister Davíð Oddsson being Jonatan's descendant, no sources back up that claim.

== Biographies ==
A biography of Jonatan by Gísli Pálsson was published in Icelandic in 2014. An English edition titled The Man Who Stole Himself: The Slave Odyssey of Hans Jonathan was published in 2016.

A documentary based on the book was premiered in 2017, where he is depicted by George Leite and Yiori Moorhead.

== Legacy ==
In 2023, Danish community theatre company Hammermøllens Teatergruppe performed the musical En fri mand (English: A Free Man) about the life of Hans Jonatan. The musical was written by Rasmus Mark Pedersen and Ulrik Trolle Schwartz, and Hans Jonatan was portrayed by Haile Grangaard Bach.

== See also ==
- Christian Hansen Ernst
- Gustav Badin
- John Panzio
