= Christian Hansen Ernst =

Norwegian civil servant (1660–1694)

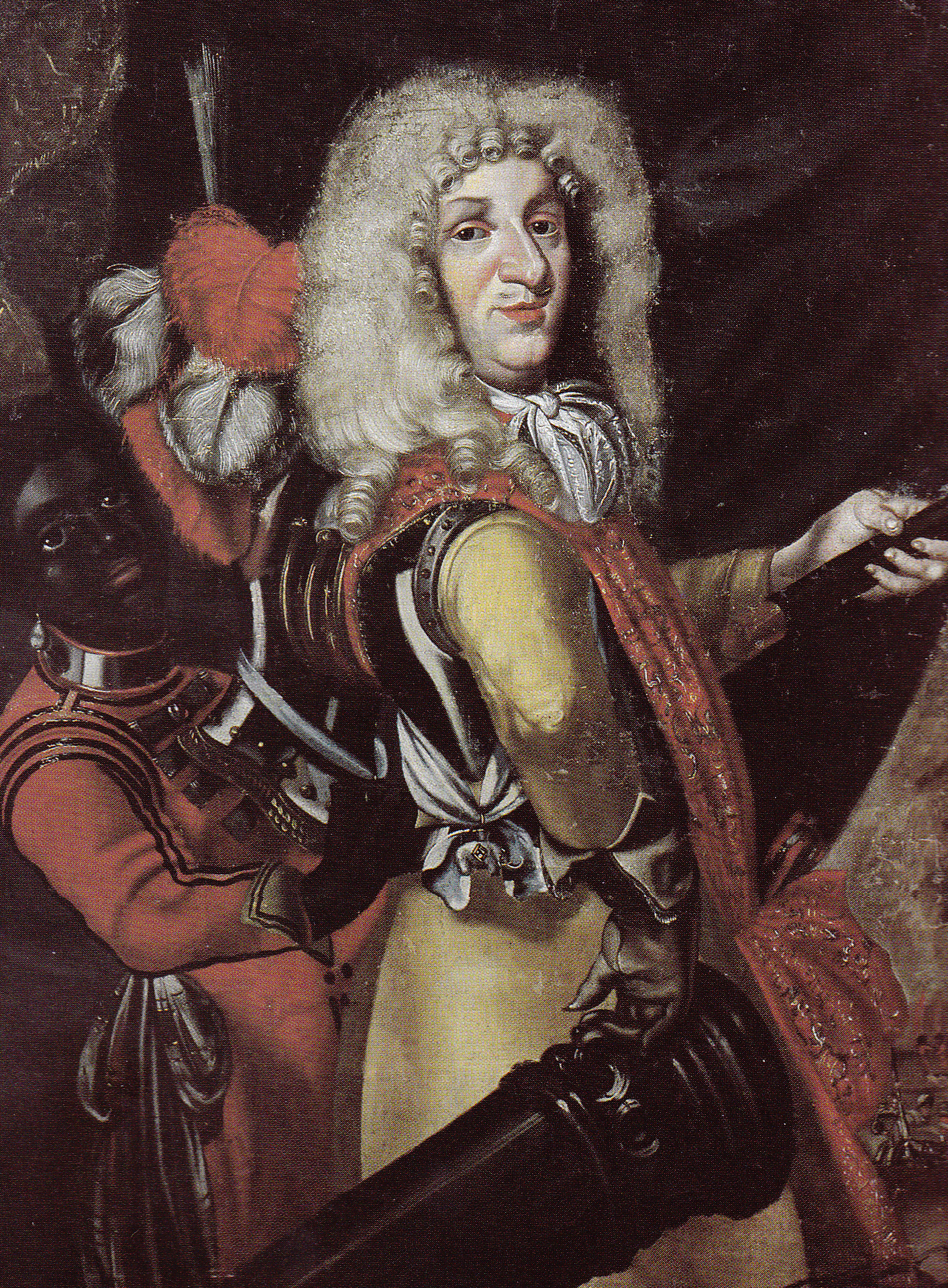
- A painting of Ulrik Frederik Gyldenløve with whom many historians believe is Christian Hansen Ernst.
- Occupations: Civil servant and postmaster

Christian Hansen Ernst was a Norwegian civil servant who served as postmaster in Kragerø. Of African descent, he was the first Black person to hold public office in Norway. He was killed in 1694 in a rivalry with another suitor for a woman's favor.

== Life and career ==
=== Early life in London ===
Ernst lived in London in 1669, where he was employed as an assistant to Ulrik Frederik Gyldenløve, who was stationed in London as ambassador from 1669 to 1670. Gyldenløve was also a governor from 1664 to 1699 and led various wars.

Gyldenløve founded Larvik in 1671 and was given primary responsibility for the post office (postmaster) in 1677. Ernst, who spoke both English and Danish, was then employed by the Englishman James Wicker who arrived in Kragerø in 1681 to begin as a customs officer.

=== Life in Kragerø ===
Ernst was later (either in 1681 or 1694) appointed by the aforementioned governor Gyldenløve to an office in Kragerø, with special responsibility for the mail going to Skien. He was also responsible for the small town's weighing and measuring, in addition to being a vraker (inspector), which entailed ensuring the quality of the fish, meat, cod liver oil and tar that was traded there.

=== Death ===
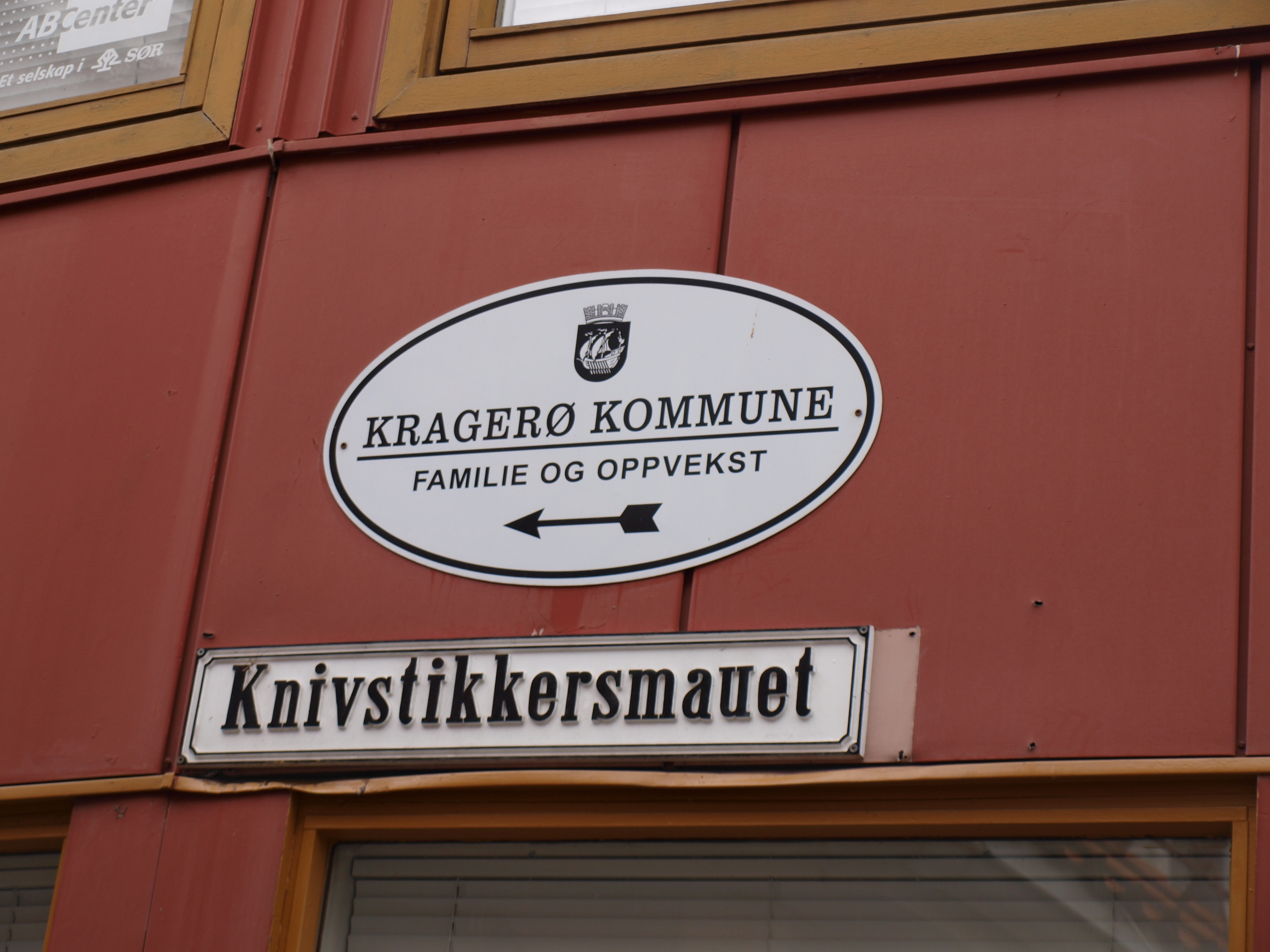
Knivstikkersmauet (knife-stabbed street), the street in Norway where Ernst was stabbed to death, July 2010.

Ernst was stabbed to death in what is now Knivstikkersmauet. According to a biography about his life, stories about this were long told in the Lystrup family at Barland in Sannidal. The murder is said to have been carried out by a Grunde Olsen Barland who courted the same Kragerø lady as Ernst, and chose to kill him, then fled the country for seven years.

James Wicker then took over his office, but died in 1697.

== Legacy and historicity ==
The painting that many historians believe depicts Ernst is hanging at the Eidsvoll Manor House, where the Norwegian constitution was written and signed.

The historian Ola Teige has questioned whether or not Ernst was ever a postmaster, claiming that it may be a local community myth.

== See also ==
- African immigration to Norway
- Anne of Denmark and her African servants
- Danish slave trade
- Gustav Badin
- Hans Jonatan
- John Panzio
