= John Panzio =

African favorite of Charles XV of Sweden

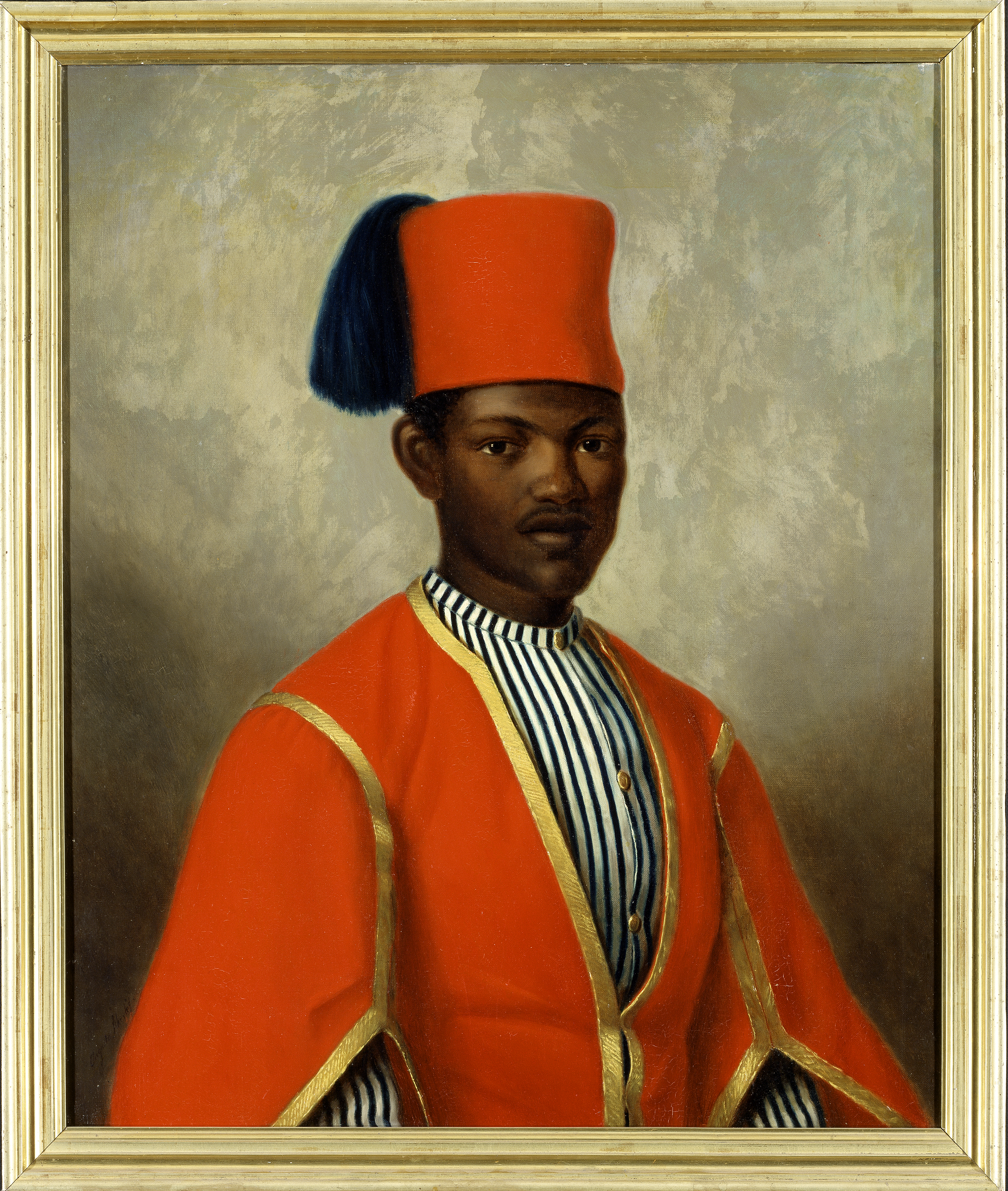
John Panzio Toxon

John Panzio Tockson, also Tuckson or Toxon (c. 1838-1888), was the African favorite and valet of king Charles XV of Sweden.

== Biography ==
Tockson’s early life is shrouded in uncertainty. In Swedish sources, his place of birth is given only as “Africa”, sometimes “Madagascar”. According to a newspaper article from 1857, he had been captured and enslaved as a child, but freed when a British warship boarded the slave ship. Other contemporary versions claim that he had been taken to the United States and then came to Sweden as a sailor. He arrived in Gothenburg in the mid-1850s, when he was about 17 years old. There he worked in various occupations, including as a gardener, hotel servant, railway worker and servant.

He first appears in Swedish newspapers in 1857, when he was baptised at Fristad hed, where the Älvsborg Regiment had its training ground. The baptism was presented as a paternalistic civilising project, led by the regiment’s commander, Colonel Ludvig Wästfelt, who had taken Tockson into his service.

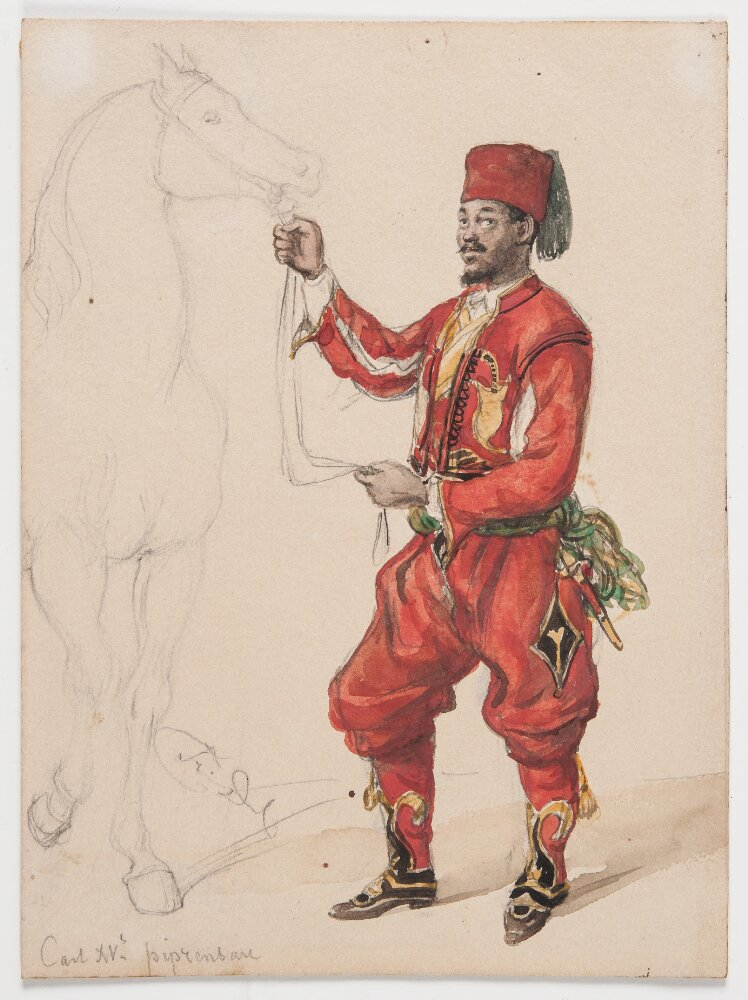
Sketch of Panzio with a horse, by Fritz von Dardel.

In 1860, Tockson entered the service of the newly crowned Charles XV, probably through Wästfelt’s contacts. At the king’s side, he quickly became a conspicuous presence in ceremonies, processions and court life. He was officially given the title “extra chamber servant” and was, among other things, the king’s pipe cleaner. Together with Ohan Demirgian, he was one of Charles’s favourites. Tockson caused a great sensation during the king’s coronation procession in Norway in 1860, where both the press and the public described him in strongly exoticising terms. He was often called “the king’s pipe cleaner”, a nickname that followed him for the rest of his life. Tockson served as a chamber footman and accompanied the king in various official contexts. His visibility and racialised portrayal helped make him a kind of popular curiosity in the capital. During his time at court he wore a uniform inspired by Orientalist and Ottoman dress — with a red bolero jacket, blue trousers and fez — which further marked his role as an exoticised figure in the court’s staging. Contemporary artists such as Fritz von Dardel depicted him with heavily exaggerated racial stereotypes, sometimes also with feminising features. There is also a portrait of Toxon, painted by Augusta Åkerlöf, which shows him in a similar costume.

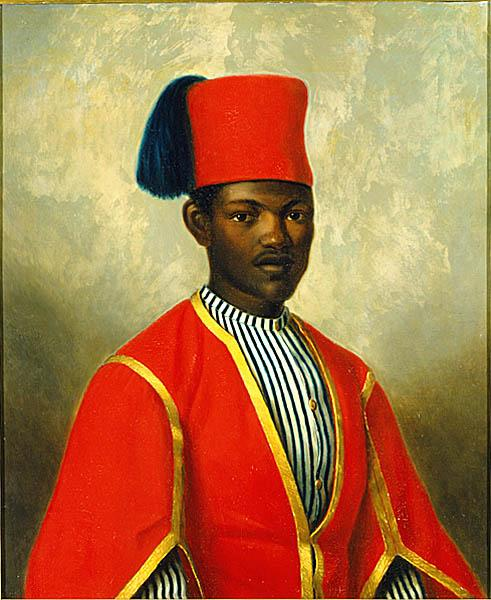
John Panzio Toxon, painted by Augusta Åkerlöf c. 1860

After the king’s death in 1872, Tockson worked mainly as an interpreter, which seems to have been his most prominent occupation in adulthood. He also took other jobs, including working for a time at a Roman bath.

According to the death register of the Royal Court Parish, John Panzio Tockson died on 27 July 1887. Tockson died suddenly after suffering a stroke in a billiards saloon. His death was reported by newspapers throughout the country, where he was almost invariably referred to by a racial epithet rather than by name. At the estate inventory conducted by Stockholm City Court on 7 September, the assets of the estate amounted to 398 kronor and 50 öre. Deductions and debts amounted to 854 kronor and 33 öre. At the time of his death he lived at Surbrunnsgatan 42, today no. 56, in Stockholm, in the property Sandören 1, today Nejlikan 1.

== Family ==
Panzio married Mathilda Charlotta Andersson, born 1846, in 1870, with whom he had two children: Arthur Panzio Tockson, born 22 April 1872, and Leopold Panzio Tockson, born 15 November 1873. Outside marriage, with Cajsa Lisa Andersdotter, born 1824, he had the twins August and Johan Panzio Tockson, born 4 July 1858, and with Clara Eugenia Wiktorin he had Jonny Otilia Tockson, born 25 September 1863, died 26 February 1906.

Newspapers often published sensational stories claiming that Tockson had fathered numerous children with different women. During and after John Panzio Tockson’s lifetime, many stories circulated in the Swedish press portraying him as hypersexual, a common racist motif in nineteenth-century Europe, where Black men were often described as driven by instinct, unreliable or threatening. The rumours continued long after his death. In the twentieth century, for example, the writer Lars Elgklou wrote that the ladies of the court had complained about Tockson’s allegedly intrusive behaviour, which was said to have led to his dismissal from service. This, however, is unsupported by contemporary sources, but has nevertheless been reproduced in popular historical accounts of Charles XV’s court.

== Legacy ==
In 1910, Gamla Breflådans Förlag published a novel based on John Panzio’s life: Karl XV:s piprensare – Interiörer från den tredje Bernadottens period by Sven-Olof Roth, under the pseudonym “Svante”.

John Panzio appears in the painting “Midsummer Dance at Ulriksdal”, after a drawing by Fritz von Dardel.

== See also ==
- Anne of Denmark and her African servants
- Christian Hansen Ernst
- Gustav Badin
- Hans Jonatan
