= Búlandstindur =

Mountain in Iceland

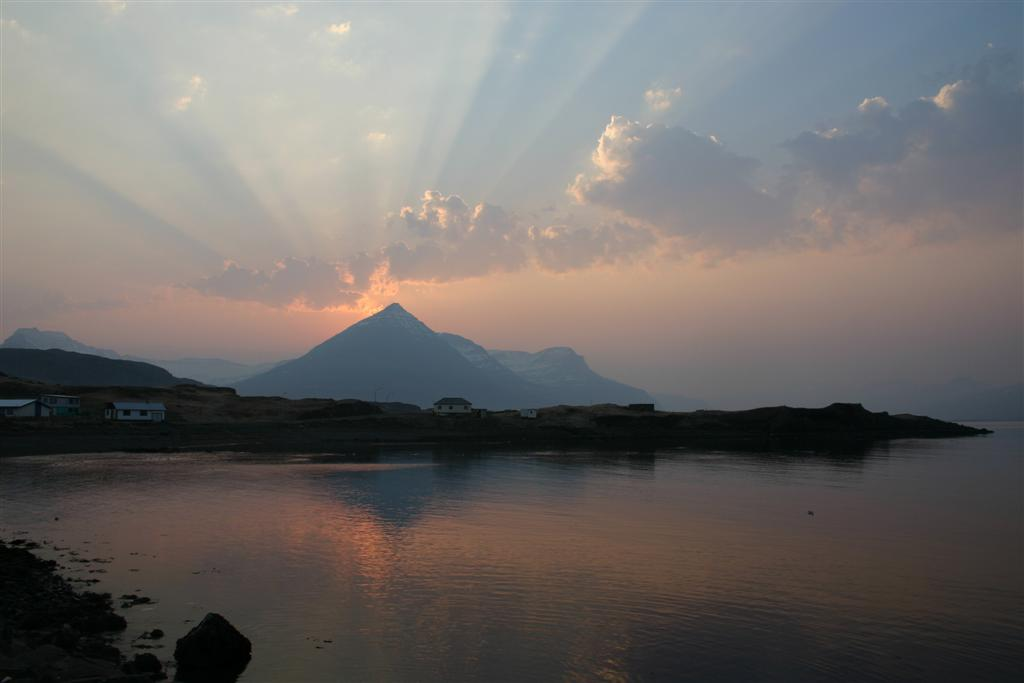
- Búlandstindur view from Djúpivogur

Highest point
- Elevation: 1,069 m (3,507 ft)
- Coordinates: 64°41′45″N 14°25′24″W

Geography
- Location within Iceland
- Location: Iceland

Búlandstindur (Icelandic pronunciation: [ˈpuːˌlan(t)sˌtʰɪntʏr̥]) is a mountain in Eastern Iceland between the bays Berufjörður and Hamarsfjörður. Mt. Búlandstindur is 1,069 metres (3,507 ft) above sea level. It is a pyramid-shaped stack of basaltic strata. The villages around this mountain are famous for fishing.

== Sources ==
- The Berufjord bay (Land og saga)
