= Anne of Denmark and her African servants =

Aspect of Black British history

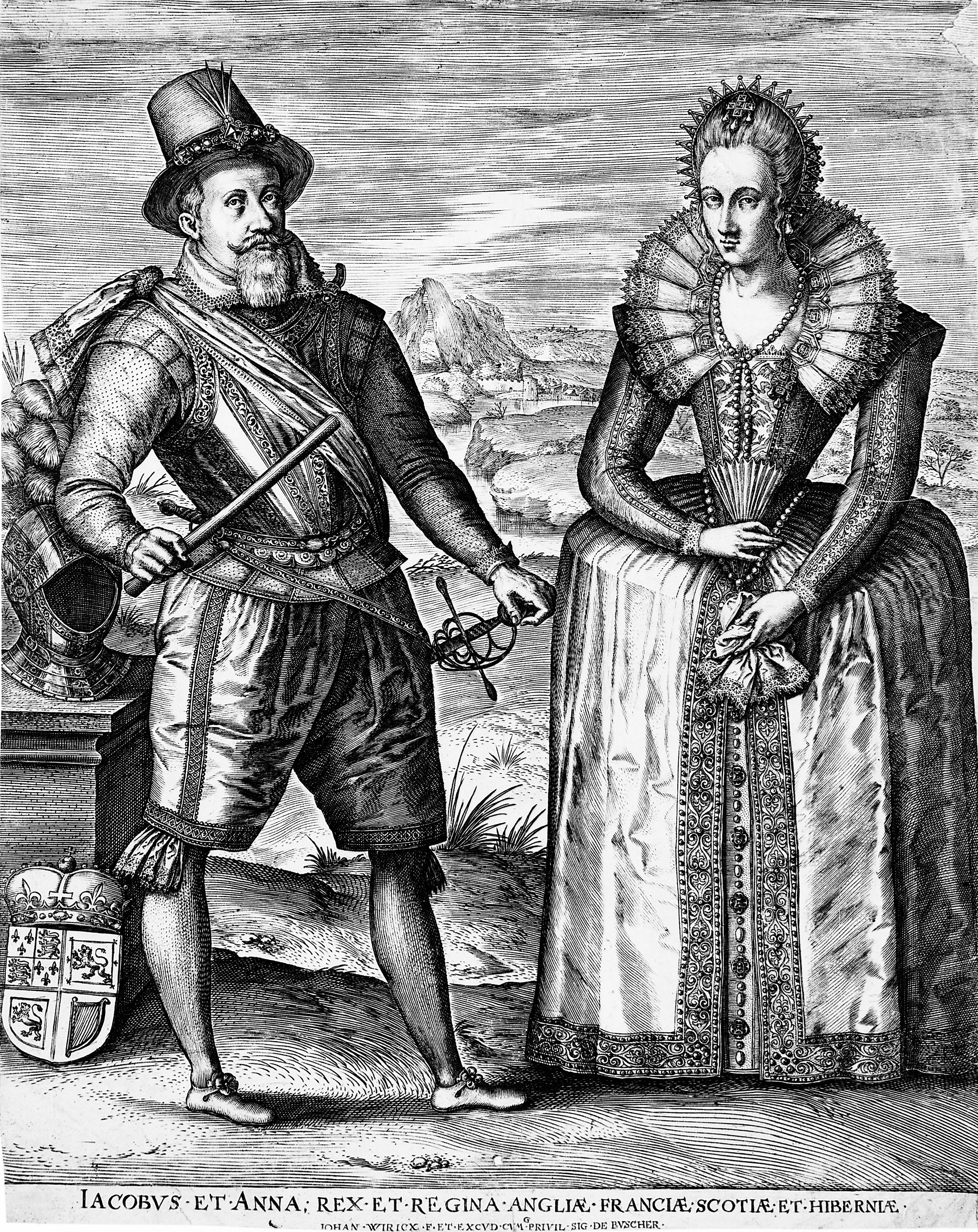
Anne of Denmark and James VI and I

Anne of Denmark (1574–1619) was the wife of James VI and I, King of Scotland, and King of England after the Union of Crowns. In 1617, she was depicted in a painting by Paul van Somer with an African servant holding her horse at Oatlands Palace. There are archival records of Africans or people of African descent, often called "Moors" or "Moirs", in her service and their costume. One of the first publications to mention Anne of Denmark's "Moir" servant in Scotland was edited by James Thomson Gibson-Craig in 1828.

== Norway and Denmark ==
James VI sailed to Norway to meet Anne of Denmark in October 1589, as his advisers thought it was time for him to marry and her older sister Elizabeth of Denmark was already engaged.

John Allyne Gade, a 20th-century biographer of the queen's brother Christian IV of Denmark, wrote in 1927 of the detail of the royal couple seeing a dance performed by African men in the snow at Oslo. Some of the dancers died from the cold.

The surviving performers accompanied the royal party in their journey to Denmark and afterward to Scotland. The source of Gade's story is unknown and its authenticity is therefore doubtful. Gade's description has been reimagined as a moving poem by Roger Reeves, In a Brief, Animated World: The Marriage of Anne of Denmark to James of Scotland, 1589. A Scottish record of expenses mentions that the newlyweds were entertained in Oslo by acrobats, recorded as two "vautis". The "vautis" performed again, in the "close" or courtyard of a Danish palace.

== Pageant in the streets of Edinburgh ==
The couple arrived back to Scotland in May 1590. A few months later, a household list records that Anne of Denmark had a "Moir" servant in her household. It is unclear if he had already been in her service in Denmark. Soon after James and Anne arrived in Scotland, there was a pageant in the streets of Edinburgh to celebrate her arrival into the town on 19 May.

A contemporary description of the 1590 Entry and coronation of Anne in Edinburgh by a Danish observer distinguished between townspeople who had blackened their faces or wore black masks, and "an absolutely real and native blackamoor" leading the ushers or whifflers who made way for the royal convoy. The original Danish phrase was, "men en ret naturlig og inföd Morian var des Anförer". He carried a drawn sword ahead of the others who were dressed in sailor's tunics. These were men from Edinburgh in blackface makeup, or were wearing black masks. David Moysie wrote that there were "42 young men from the town all clad in white taffeta and visors of black colour, on their faces like Mores, all full of gold chains, that danced before her grace all the way". These performers, according to the poet John Burel, represented "Moirs" of "the Inds" who lived in comparative ease and comfort by the golden mountain of "SYNERDAS". They had come to salute Scotland's new queen and offer to her service their "most willing minds". They marched in front of her down the Canongate where she passed "intill hir Pallace", Holyroodhouse.

It is not known if the man who participated in the street pageant was the "Moir" subsequently listed as a member of Anne of Denmark's household. The "Moir", like the other gentlemen and servants, was allowed 3 pints of ale at dinner. He wore clothes of orange velvet and Spanish taffeta. The costume was similar to those made for others who served as "pages of the equerry". He was to eat with the three "lackeys" who attended the queen when she went riding with her companions, including Anna Kaas and, later, Margaret Vinstarr. The pages and lackeys were young men drawn from the Scottish and Danish gentry. Clothes were made for six pages and four lackeys at Anne's coronation on 17 May 1590, it was not recorded if the "Moir" was one these young men.

== Clothes and livery for royal servants of African origin ==
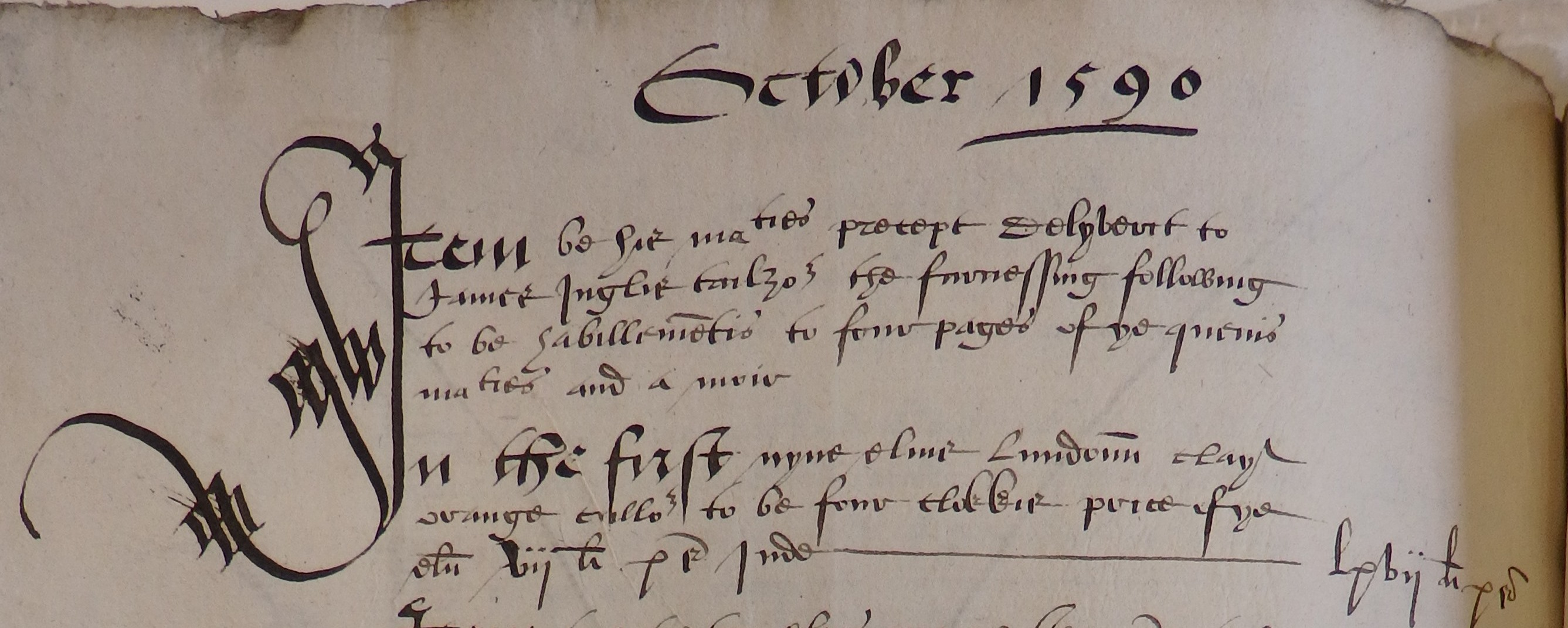
Clothes were bought for four pages and the "Moir" in October 1590, Treasurer's Accounts, National Records of Scotland.

Clothes for servants were made in October and November 1590 by two tailors who served the court, James Inglis and Alexander Miller. Costume for the "Moir" included an orange velvet "jupe" and breeches and a doublet of shot-silk Spanish taffeta festooned with white satin passementerie. His hat was of yellow Spanish taffeta lined with orange. Cloaks for the four pages were made of orange London cloth and their jupes of orange stemming, the velvet for the African servant came from the queen's own stock, paid for from the English subsidy. The jupes were lined with a cloth called "grey bukkessie". At least one of the pages, a young man, James Murray, had previously served the king and travelled to Denmark to join Anne's household in 1589. Clothes were also bought for the two Danish palfreymen and the Mecklenburg and Brunswick lackeys whose distinctive liveries underscored her royal identity.

There seem to be no further records of wages or livery allowances to be paid to this individual in the National Records of Scotland. Little can be inferred from this; the Scottish lackey for the queen's gentlewomen, James Glen, worked for five years without pay, and another servant, Jens Pierson, a Danish man who looked after Anne of Denmark's horse had received no cash pay after twelve years service. An unpaid French stable worker, Guillaume Martin, ran away with his friend the queen's jeweller, Jacob Kroger. However, payments were made to the companions of the African servant, the queen's four pages and three lackeys, at the end of 1591. This money was the cash equivalent of their allocated "linen cloth" livery as members of the queen's household, calculated "according to the custom of Denmark". One list of payments mentions three keepers of the Queen's riding horse, naming "Williame Huntar", "George Kendo (or Keudo)", and "Johnne Broun", who received Scottish livery allowances.

== The burial at Kilgour ==
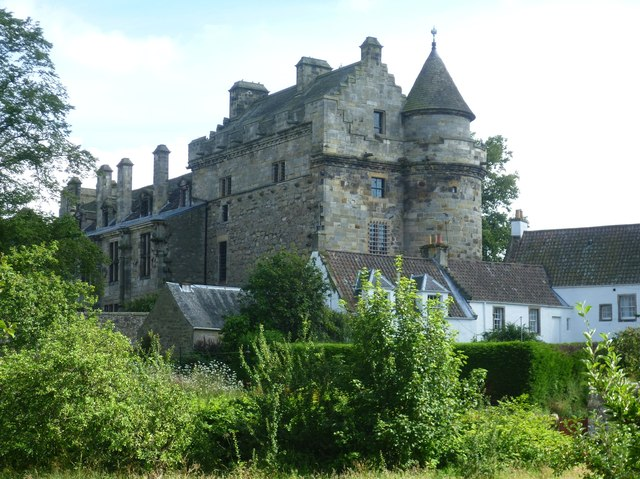
The funeral of a man now known only as the "Moir" who died at Falkland Palace was held in July 1591

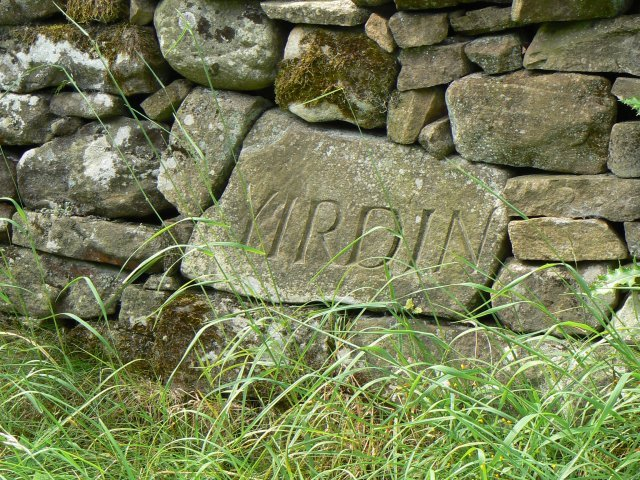
The "Yirdin" stone at the House of Falkland commemorates the old funeral route to Kilgour. "Yirdin" is a Scots word for burial.

An African servant at the Scottish court was buried at Falkland in July 1591. James VI paid £7-6s-8d Scots for the costs. It is not clear if he was the participant in the 1590 Entry of Anne of Denmark. He may have been the person in the queen's household for whom clothes were bought, and such payments were not again recorded.

At this time the church and burial ground of Falkland parish was at Kilgour, to the west of the Palace and town. It is said that coffins rested at a spot called the "Pillars of Hercules" on the way to Kilgour. A replacement church was built in Falkland town around 1620 by the master mason John Mylne and his son, and the site of the old church is now a farm.

=== A page at the court of Queen Elizabeth ===
African servants were also present at court in England, a part of the household's public life. Elizabeth I had a page of African origin in 1574 and 1575. He was recorded when clothes were bought for him as "a littell Black a More". Probably a young boy, his clothes included a coat of cut white taffeta lined with tinsel, with gold and silver, and a similar doublet, and a carnation and silver costume with a decorative green doublet. He may have attended Elizabeth in her presence chamber, exhibited as a symbolic advertisement of royal power.

== Baptism of Prince Henry at Stirling ==
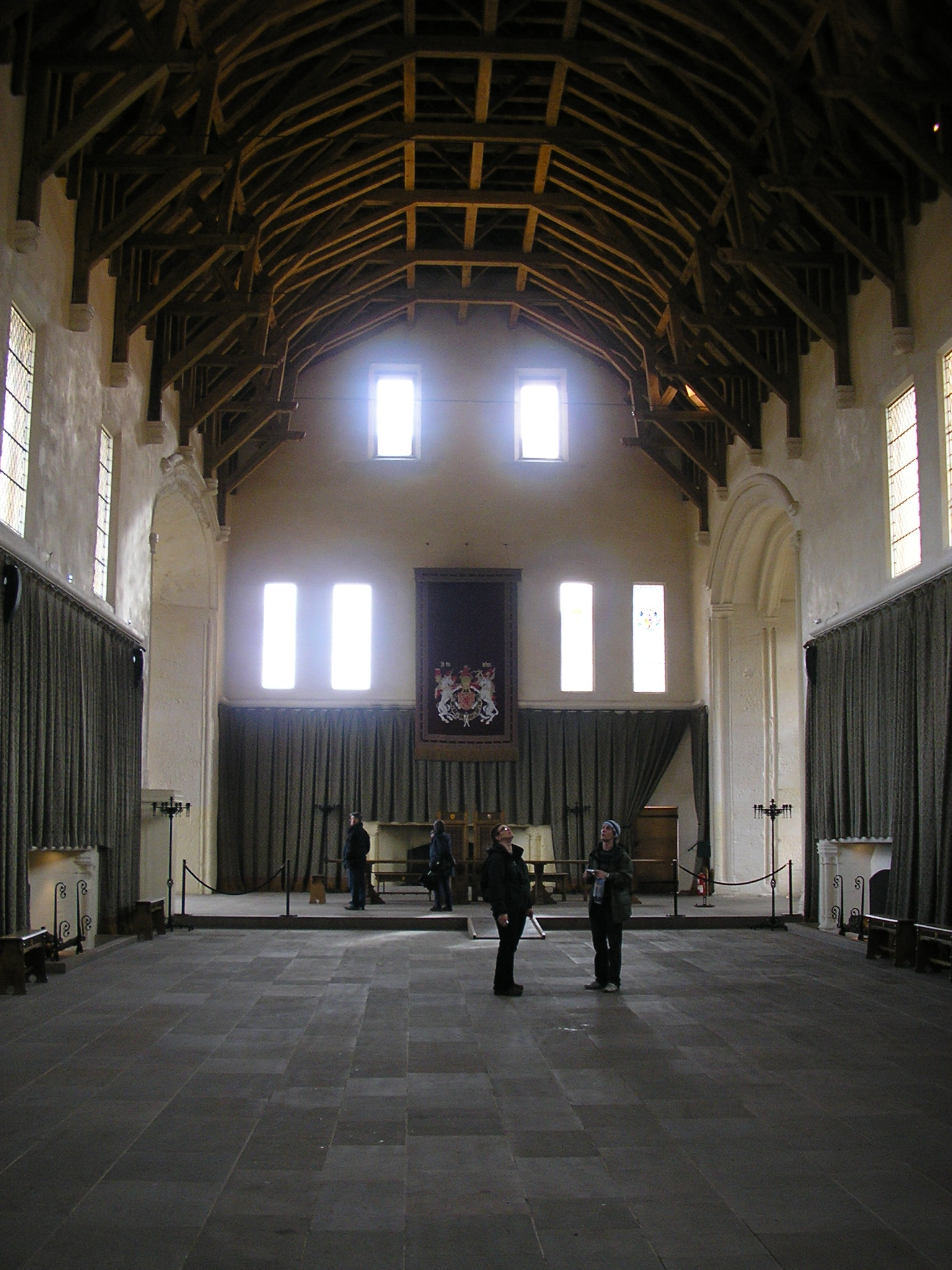
A "More" at court performed at the feast at the baptism of Prince Henry at Stirling Castle in August 1594

At the feast following the baptism of her son Prince Henry on 30 August 1594 at Stirling Castle, a "Moore" dragged a pageant cart with six ladies holding desserts towards the dais or high table in the great hall. He pretended to pull the stage with chains or draught traces fashioned like gold chains. It was really winched or pushed by hidden workmen. His performance was a last-minute substitute for a lion. Perhaps this actor was the same Afro-Scot as the man in the pageant in the streets of Edinburgh in May 1590. The scene was described, in the Scots language:

there cam into the sight of thame all a blak More drawing as it seemed to the behalders a tabernacle ful of patisserye frutages and confections and in the sydis thairoff wer placed sax wemen quhilk [which] represented a silent comedie, ... So this tabernacle, quhilk suld have bene drawen in by a lyon it self, yet becaus his presence might [have] brought some feare to the nerrest it was thought gud the More suld supple [supply] that roume,

The women, in glittering costumes bought with money from Anne's dowry, represented Ceres, Fecundity, Faith, Concord, Liberality, and Perseverance (Assurance), celebrating Anne's statecraft and offering benefits in accord with Scottish masque traditions. The entertainment was written by William Fowler. His published description of the substitution of the African actor for the lion has been suggested by Edmond Malone and others as the source of an allusion in Shakespeare's A Midsummer Night's Dream. As the characters discuss their play of Pyramus and Thisbe, Snout wonders "Will not the ladies be afeard of the lion?".

== Anne of Denmark and a groom at Oatlands ==
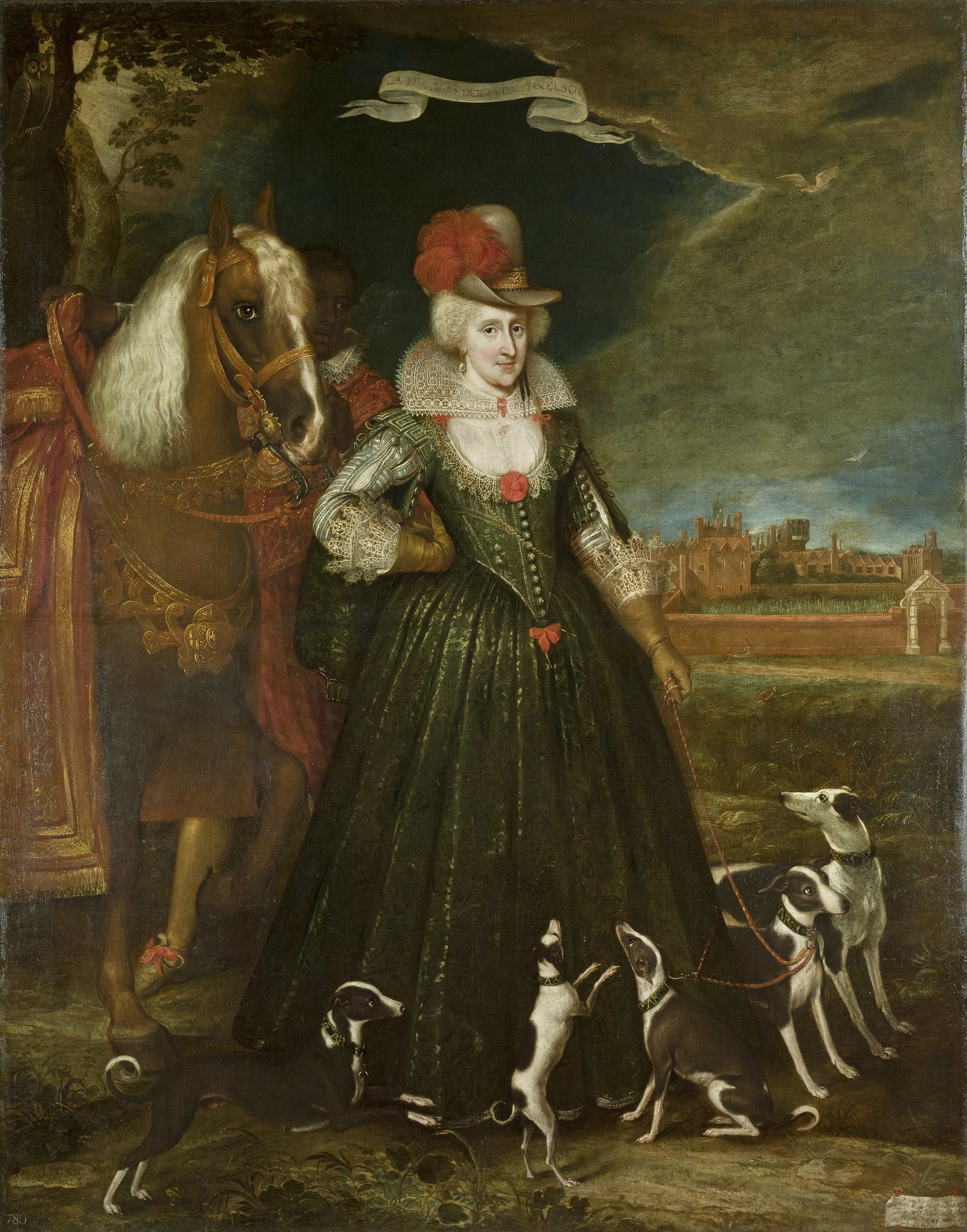
Anne of Denmark and her African servant at Oatlands Palace, by Paul van Somer. The name of the servant has not yet been traced.

The man depicted in Paul van Somer's 1617 portrait of Anne of Denmark may have been a member of Anne of Denmark's household in England, a page, groomsman or groom rider of the royal stable. His costume may be the scarlet and gold livery of the House of Oldenburg, the royal dynasty of Denmark. His name has not yet been discovered. Records of the royal stable survive, naming some of the grooms and riders who attended Anne of Denmark and the fees and livery payments they received. Three years after Anne's death, in 1622, the Earl of Salisbury gave six shillings to an African servant at Theobalds House, to "the blackemor att Theoballs".

The painting shows the queen with her dogs in the park at Oatlands Palace near Weybridge in Surrey. Anne of Denmark owned Italian Greyhounds. The diplomat Ralph Winwood obtained special greyhounds for her hunting from Jacob van den Eynde, Governor of Woerden, and she also requested dogs via the French ambassador Boderie. It is thought she is ready to mount and set out to hunt hares, and she had hunted hares and deer as a child in Denmark. The gate seen in the background leads from the hunting grounds into the palace gardens. It was built by John Trevor to the designs of Inigo Jones. Jones provided designs for the costumes and scenery of her masques.

Paul van Somer's portrait may have been intended to bolster Anne of Denmark's image as queen consort in the year her husband left her London for a return visit to Scotland. The inclusion of the African groom in the picture may have been intended as an accessory to queenship, heightening the queen's authority and regal stature, and "by gazing towards her with an air of servitude and adoration, he invites the viewer to follow suit and defer to the queen consort of England".

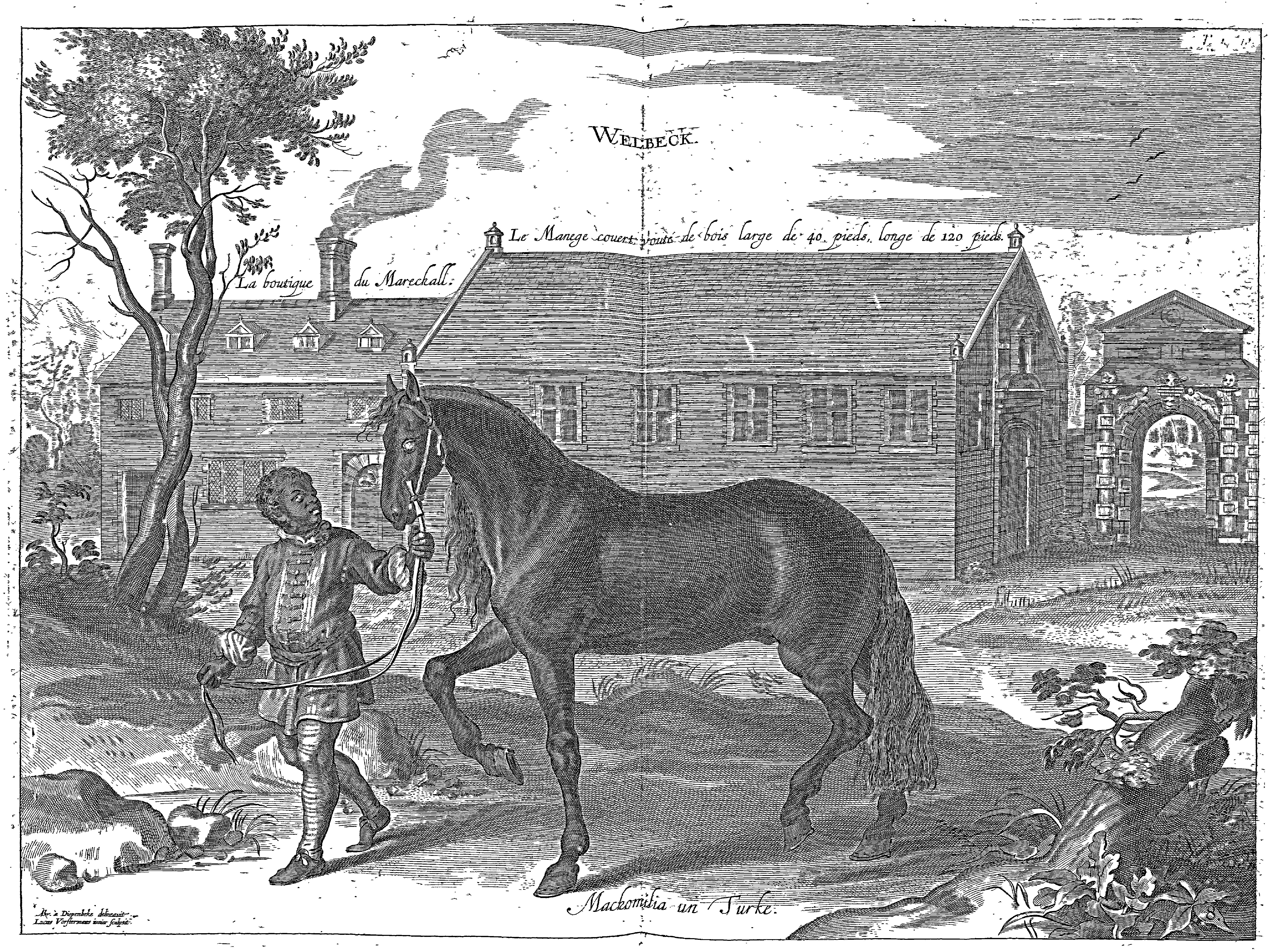
A groom of African heritage in livery costume at Welbeck Abbey, engraved for William Cavendish, L'Art de dresser les chevaux.

Queen Victoria's dog Cherry barked at the painted greyhounds in 1838 when the picture was at Windsor. The 19th-century historian Agnes Strickland identified the servant as Anne's "black-a-moor groom". He wears a lace-edged collar, a red doublet patterned with gold braid and red ties, red bag breeches banded with darker red fabric, silver grey hose, and shoes with a pink bow. His white cuff is visible at the front pommel of the saddle and he holds the reins. A groom is shown in a similar pose in an earlier picture by Robert Peake the Elder, Henry Frederick, Prince of Wales, with Sir John Harington in the Hunting Field, 1603 now at the Metropolitan Museum of Art. Another version of Peake's picture, now in the Royal Collection, includes Robert Devereux, 3rd Earl of Essex.

=== The Penshurst double portrait ===
Another painting, in the collections of Penshurst Place, shows two young men or boys standing together. In the 19th-century the painting was reputed to depict Prince Rupert and his black slave. It was later suggested the subject was Frederick or Charles Louis and his servant or page. These identifications are now rejected. The picture is dated 1626 and an inscription indicates the boys are aged 13. Their identity and the identity of the artist is unknown.

Charles I and Henrietta Maria with an African groom.

On the left, the boy wears riding boots and spurs and is holding his hat. His costume is that of young aristocrat close to the court, His companion, on the right, who appears to be of African heritage, wears a long red coat or jupe striped with gold braid, over a grey doublet, and holds a grey cloak and a sword. He wears red hose with yellow or garters garters, his black shoes with bows are like those of Anne of Denmark's groom rather than the riding boots worn by his companion. The two young men are placed in an interior but their backdrop revealed by a curtain is the open countryside where a hunt is in progress. The composition of this painting is unusual, and may suggest that the unknown sitters are standing to take their leave and are soon to depart, perhaps for the hunt. The sword may be that used at the climax of a deer hunt.

The Penshurst painting features both boys at nearly the same size and in full view. A slightly later portrait of Charles I and Henrietta Maria with Jeffrey Hudson attributed to Daniël Mijtens includes an African groom as a dimunitive figure dressed with a leopard skin rather than the apparently realistic livery depicted in the other pictures.

== Material culture and theatre ==
A pair of earrings made for Anne of Denmark by George Heriot survives in a private collection. They feature the enamelled face of an African man. The earrings were itemised by Heriot in 1609 as "two pendants made as more's heads and all sett with diamonds, price £70." They may reflect her fascination with the representation of African people in the theatre, as in her Masque of Blackness performed on 6 January 1605. Perhaps her personal participation in that masque, and the performances in 1590 and 1594 evoked a queenly identity based on the mythical figure of Scota, a daughter of an Egyptian pharaoh and foundation figure in Scottish national identity whose name is based on the Greek word for darkness, skotos, σκότος.

Ben Jonson, author of the masque, credited the impersonation of African characters in The Masque of Blackness to "her majesty's will". The queen and eleven ladies appeared in blackface as the daughters of "Father Niger". The character was a personification of the River Niger and his daughters may have represented the waters of the Niger Delta. The daughters of Niger would turn white in the climate of newly united Britain. In 1610 Anne of Denmark returned to the theme of rivers, this time the rivers of Wales, for the investiture of her son Prince Henry as Prince of Wales in the masque Tethys' Festival.

Kim F. Hall draws attention to The Masque of Blackness and the documented reactions of its audience, in the context of the "growth of actual contact with Africans, Native Americans, and other ethnically different foreigners" and, referring to Shakespeare's Dark Lady sonnets, a "collision of the dark lady tradition with the actual African difference encountered in the quest for empire". A "pride in the revival of ancient Britain is continually yoked to the glorification of whiteness". Sujata Iyengar reads Anne of Denmark's decision to disguise herself and her ladies as "Blackamores" as a revival of Scottish court drama, and a desire for a "new coronation" and an assertion of her power in England. Iyengar emphasises that the role of King James in the masque was to whiten the complexions of the twelve dancers, a Sun King reflecting the Solomon of the Song of Songs.

Barbara Kiefer Lewalski identified the use of African disguise as a subversion of her husband's authority. Susan Dunn-Hensley reviews recent scholarship of The Masque at Blackness as in part, an articulation of Anne of Denmark's independence from her husband. Pascale Aebischer discusses how recent critics confront such racist myths generated in the context of the Union of the Crowns of England and Scotland and the subsequent Jacobean debate on the Union.

During The Memorable Masque of the Middle Temple and Lincoln's Inn, one of the entertainments at the wedding of Anne of Denmark's daughter Elizabeth, the horses of the Virginian princes were attended by "Moors, attired like Indian slaves". Within the fictional world of the masque, the actors may have represented enslaved indigenous Americans. In reality, Africans laboured in the New World gold and silver mines presented in the Memorable Masque. The grooms' costumes in the Memorable Masque were blue and gold, the masquing courtiers in Blackness wore azure and silver.

== See also ==
- Christian Hansen Ernst
- Gustav Badin
- John Panzio
