= Æðarstein Lighthouse =

Lighthouse in Iceland

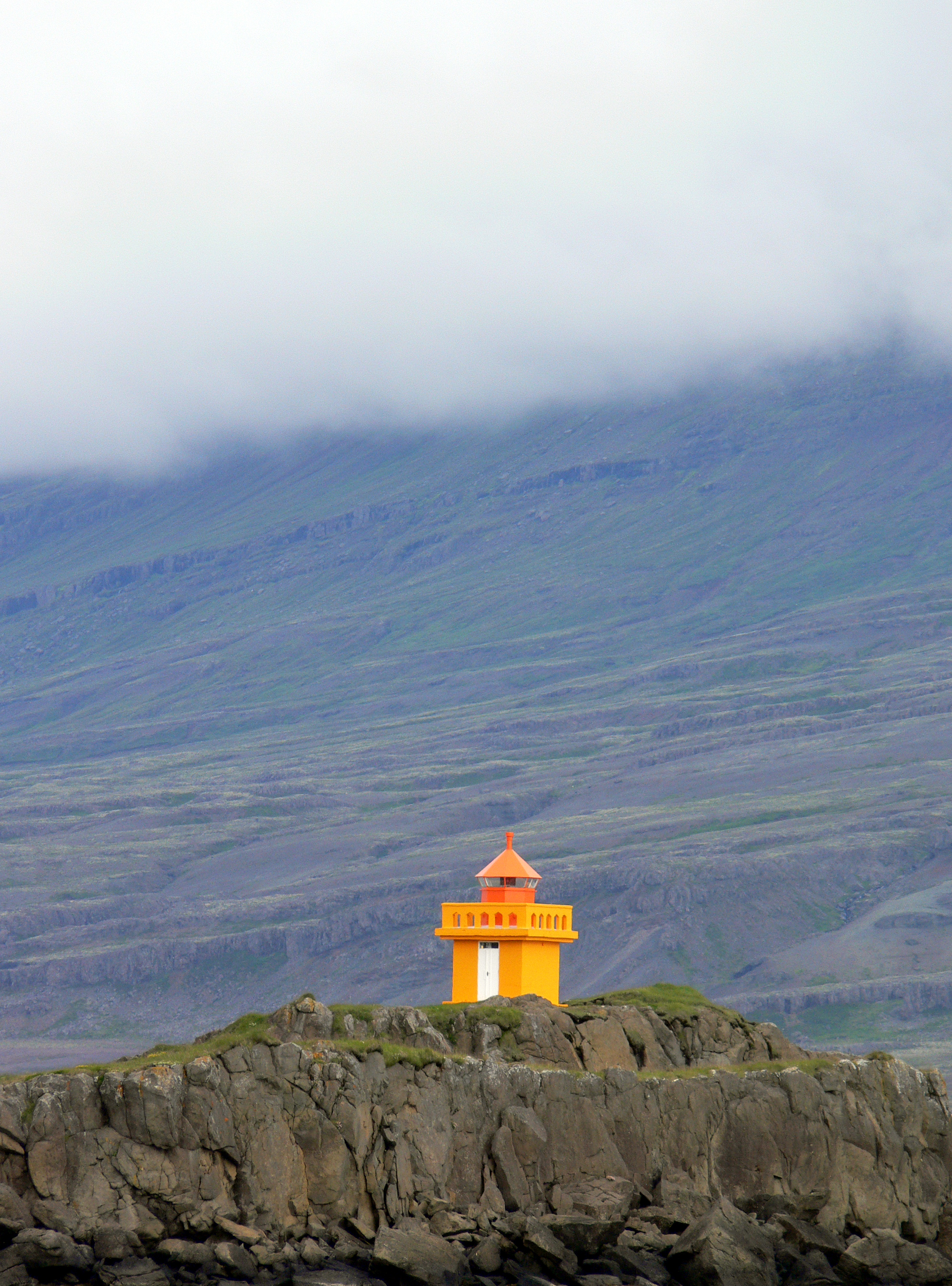
- Æðarstein Lighthouse (Æðarsteinsviti)
- Location: Djúpivogur, Iceland
- Coordinates: 64°40′05.6″N 14°17′37.6″W

Tower
- Constructed: 1922
- Construction: concrete
- Height: 6 m (20 ft)
- Shape: square tower with balcony and lantern
- Markings: orange tower, red lantern

Light
- Focal height: 10 m (33 ft)
- Characteristic: Fl WRG 5s
- Iceland no.: VIT-242

The Æðarstein Lighthouse (Icelandic: Æðarsteinsviti Icelandic pronunciation: [ˈaiːðarˌsteinsˌvɪːtɪ]) is located on the southeast coast of Iceland, on a rocky point on the west side of the port of Djúpivogur.

== Description ==
The lighthouse consists of a square concrete tower, painted orange. A red metal lantern house is placed on top of the tower. The focal plane of the light is 10 m (33 ft). The overall height of the tower, including the lantern, is 10 m (33 ft). The lighthouse is automated. The site (but not the tower) is open to visitors.

== History ==
The Æðarstein Lighthouse was built in 1922. The architect and engineers were architect engineer Thorvald Krabbe and Gudmundur J. Hlíðdal. Before 1966 the lighthouse was white with two horizontal stripes. The light was converted to electric power in 1987.

== Characteristic ==
The light flashes every 5 seconds. The flash is a white, green or red sector light.

== See also ==
- List of lighthouses in Iceland
