= Gustav Badin =

Swedish courtier and diarist (1747/1750–1822)

Adolf Gustav Badin
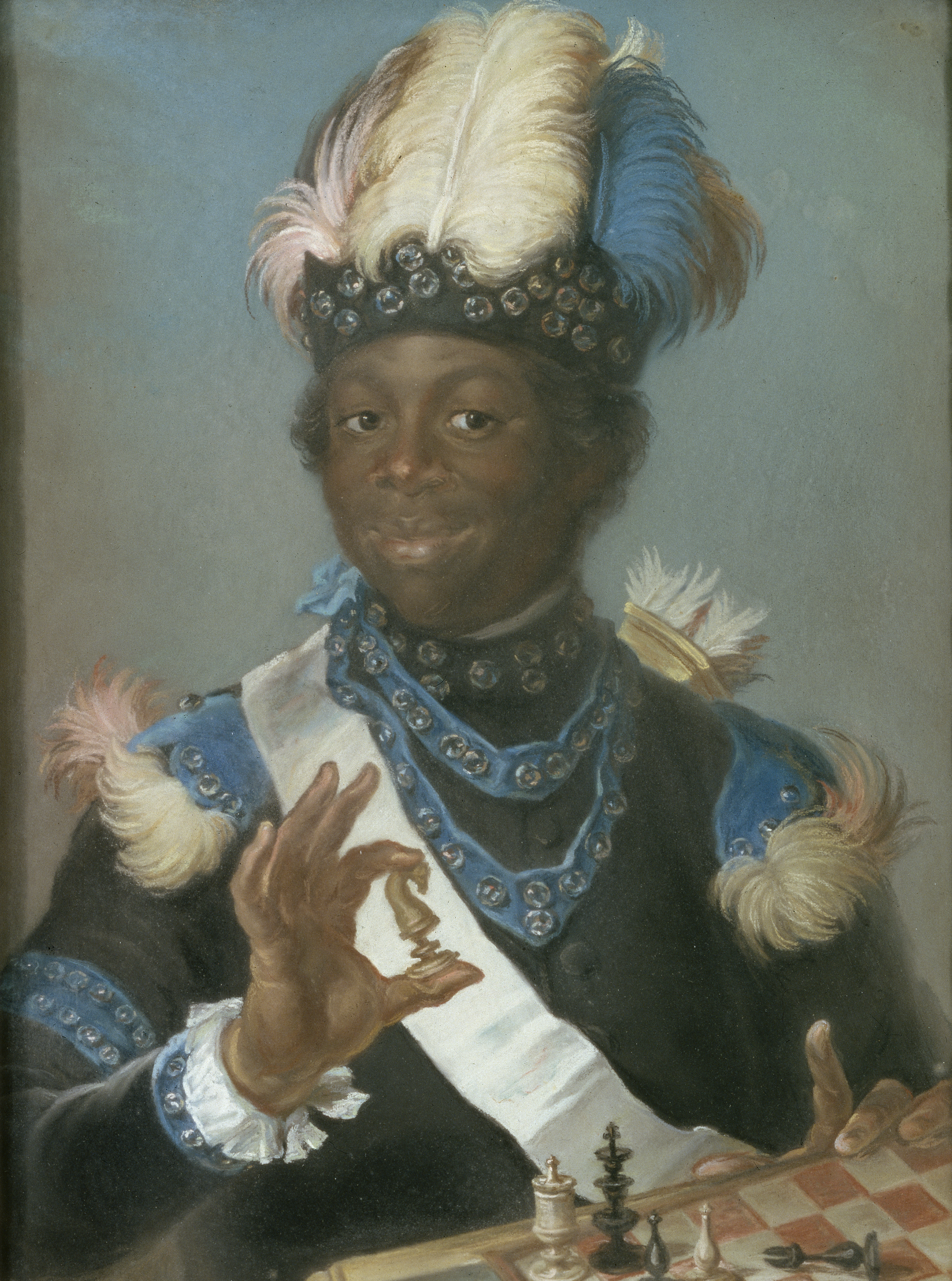
- Portrait by Gustaf Lundberg, 1775
- Born: Couchi; 1747 or 1750; Africa or Saint Croix, Danish West Indies
- Died: 1822 (aged 71–75); Sweden
- Other names: Adolf Ludvig Gustav Fredrik Albert Badin or Badin
- Occupations: Servant to Queen Louisa Ulrika of Sweden; then to Princess Sophia Albertine of Sweden
- Known for: Court Secretary
- Spouses: Elisabeth Svart; Magdalena Eleonora Norell

Adolf Ludvig Gustav Fredrik Albert Badin (né Couchi; 1747 or 1750 – 1822) was a Swedish courtier and diarist. Born in either the Danish West Indies or Africa, he spent his early life as a slave before being brought to Sweden in the late 1750s. Badin was the foster son and servant of Queen Louisa Ulrika of Sweden and a servant to his foster sister Princess Sophia Albertine of Sweden. His original name was Couchi, but he was commonly known as Badin ('mischief-maker' or 'trickster').

== Early life ==
Gustav Badin's date of birth and early life are the subject of dispute. He was traditionally identified as being born in 1747, but Swedish court records registered him as being born in 1750, a date which is considered more correct by modern historians. Badin was born either in Africa or on the island of Saint Croix, then part of the Danish West Indies. He once stated that the only memory he had of his early life was witnessing his parents' hut burning. However, it is known for certain that he grew up in Saint Croix.

Accounts of how Badin came to Europe are also the subject of dispute. One account involved him being transported by a Danish East Indiaman from Saint Croix to Denmark, where he was bought by a Danish sea captain and gifted to the Swedish politician Anders von Resier (sv), who in turn gave him as a present to Queen Louisa Ulrika of Prussia in 1757. Another account involved Badin being enslaved by Christian Leberecht von Prøck, the governor-general of the Danish West Indies, and taken by him in 1758 to Denmark, where Prøck gifted him to the Danish councillor Gustav de Brunck who in turn gave him to Louisa Ulrika in 1760. Upon his arrival in Sweden, Badin was automatically free, as Swedish law did not legally recognise slavery, which had been abolished in the country in 1335.

== Upbringing at court ==
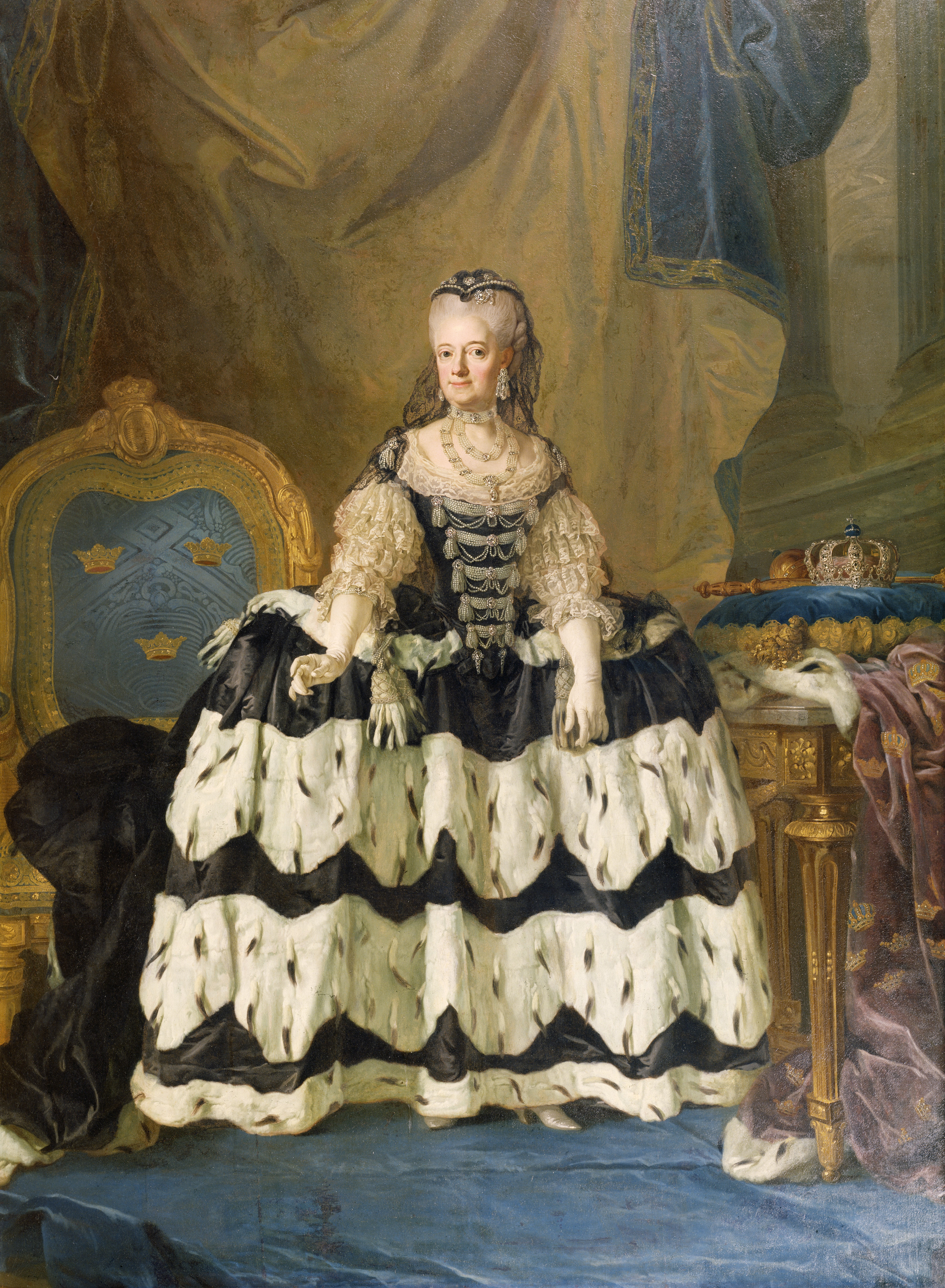
Louisa Ulrika of Prussia, who oversaw Badin's upbringing

The queen decided to make him an experiment in upbringing; she was interested in science and had founded a science academy, the Royal Swedish Academy of Letters, History and Antiquities, where, among other topics, the origin of man and civilisation was discussed, such as the nature of "savages", the noble savage and the natural human, and in Badin, she saw an opportunity to test the theories of Rousseau and Linné. She instructed him in Christianity and taught him to read and write, but after this, he was allowed to live entirely according to his own will and judgement.

He grew up as a playmate of the children in the royal family, who were brought up in a much more restricted way than he was, and was allowed to speak to them in a natural way and even fight and tease them, which was considered scandalous. He knew all the secret passages within the royal castles and, as it was said, all the secrets within its walls. Contemporary diaries describe how he climbed on the chairs of the king and queen, called everyone "you" instead of using their titles, talked rudely to the nobility and ridiculed religion when interrogated about the Bible by Countess Brahe, which made everyone laugh; he was very witty and verbal.

The relationship with his royal foster-siblings was in general described as good, no matter that he called King Gustav "Gustav the Willen" and Duke Charles "Mr Tobacco". He was close to his foster-sister, Princess Sophia Albertina, and wrote a poem for her on her birthday (1764):

"I, one of the Black People
Unfamiliar with this country's customs
Make a wish from my heart
To our Princess too."

== Court life in adulthood ==
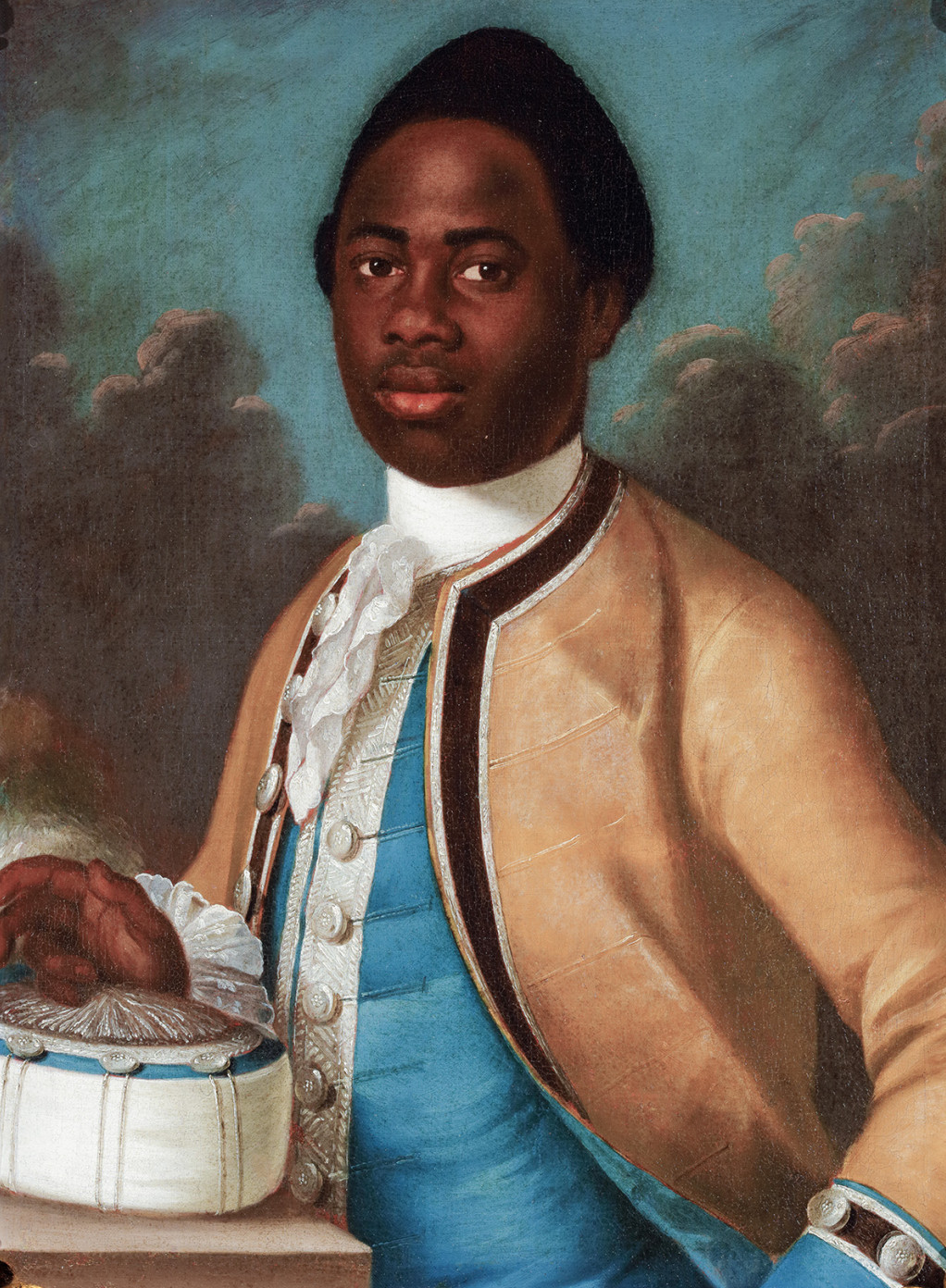
1776 portrait of Badin by Jakob Björck

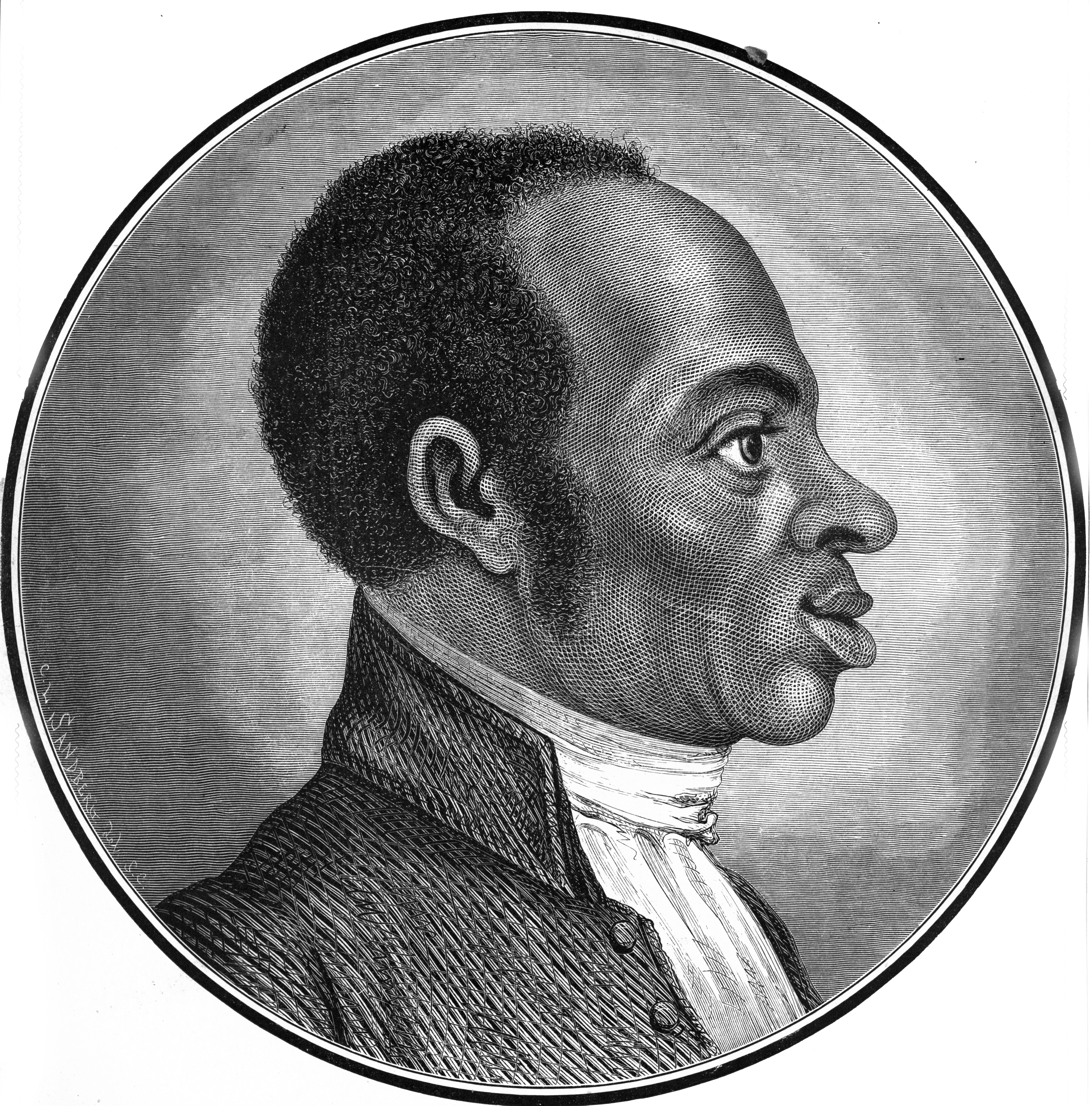
1877 engraving of Badin

On 11 December 1768, he was baptised in the chapel of Drottningholm Palace with the entire royal family, except Prince Charles, as his godparents. He was described as an intelligent and reliable person with self-confidence, and though he was informed about many of the secrets of the royal family and the court, he never revealed anything, and was very loyal to the royal house throughout his entire life. Badin sometimes helped the court poet Bellman to compose verses for special occasions, and some of them were published in his name. Badin participated in plays at the French Theatre in Bollhuset; he is listed as a dancer in a ballet in the 1769–70 season and played the main part in Arlequin Sauvage in the 1770–71 season, a play in which a "savage" meets civilization, and an erotic play by Marivaux.

In 1782, when the queen lay on her death-bed in her country residence, she sent Badin to Stockholm with the key to her files. After her death, Badin acquired the files and handed them in the custody of prince Fredrick Adolf and princess Sophia Albertina, who burnt them. The young king, Gustav III of Sweden, became enraged. They had an argument and the king said; "Do you not know, you black person, that such things may cost your head?" He replied: "My head is in the power of your Majesty, but I could not act in a different way."

== Private life ==
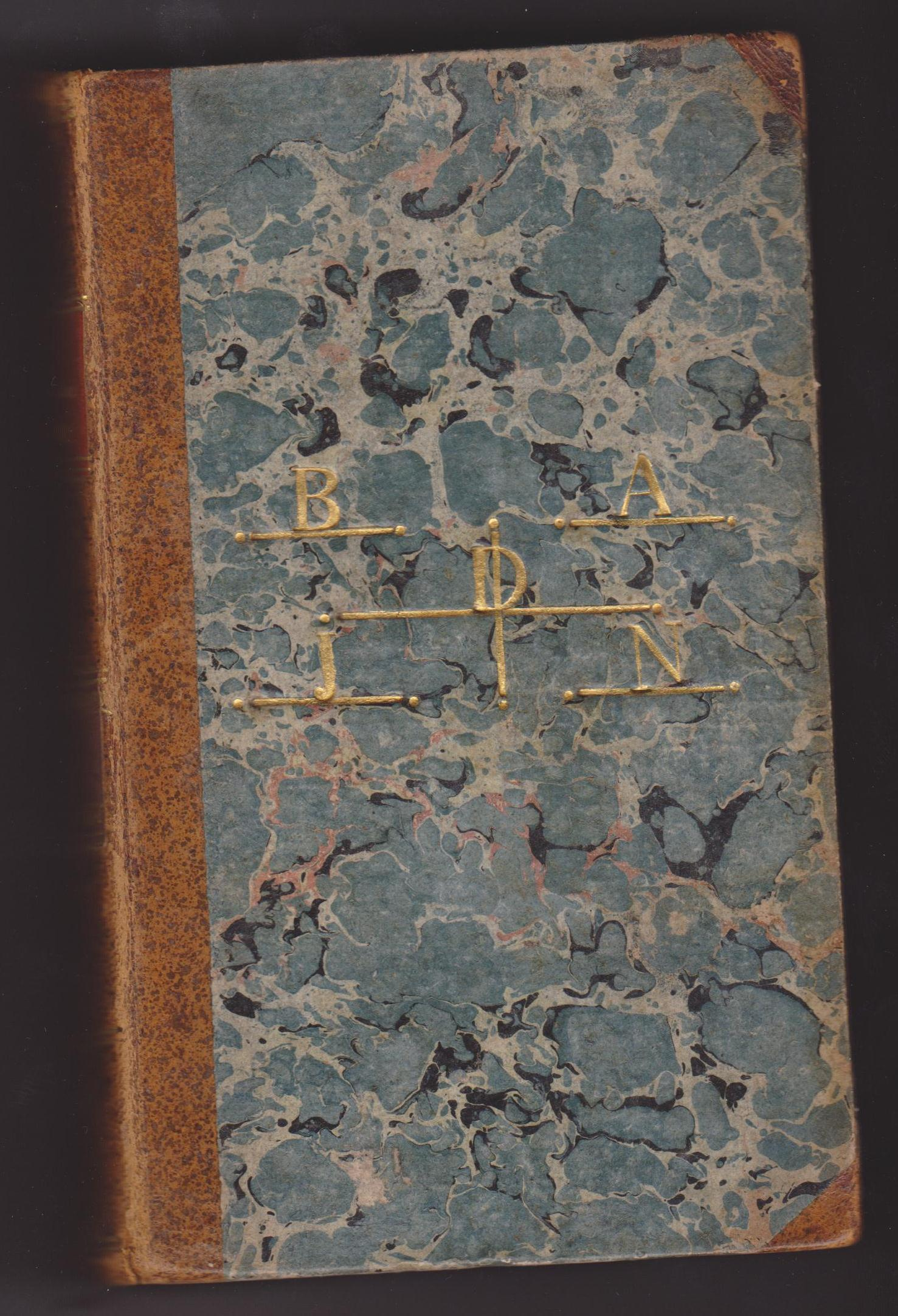
A book from Badin's library with his name lettered in gilt on its front cover

The social position of Badin is not quite clear. When his foster mother queen dowager Louisa Ulrika died in 1782, he and his foster sister princess Sophia Albertina were no longer the wards of the queen dowager and her household, but now under the responsibility of the king, Gustav III himself. After the death of Queen Louisa Ulrika, Badin was given three farmhouses outside Stockholm by the Swedish king, which gave him an income and some financial security. He was also given several honorary titles, such as chamberlain, court secretary, ballet master and Assessor (a judge's or magistrate's assistant). Despite having the honorary title Assessor, which gave him the right to refer to himself as an official, he refused and replied to the king: "Have you ever seen a black assessor?" Instead preferred to call himself farmer, referring to the two farms he owned.

Badin was married twice but died childless. The rumors that he was the father of the alleged secret daughter of Sophia Albertina have never been confirmed. He married the grocer's daughter Elisabet Swart (d. 1798) in 1782, and the ship carpenter's daughter Magdalena Eleonora Norell (1779–c.1840) in 1799. He did have a child with his first wife, but the child died in infancy in 1784, and no other biological children are noted. He and his second wife are however noted to have had a foster daughter named Christina living with them.

He was elected to the orders of Par Bricole, Svea Orden, Timmermansorden and the Freemasons.

During his later life, he was reportedly supported financially by princess Sophia Albertina. His home is described as neither rich nor poor but comfortable, and he and his wife are noted to have been generous and often having guests, notably his wife's relatives, living with them. They shared their time between their home in Stockholm and their two farms in Uppland, when Badin gradually spent less and less time at court.

Badin collected an extensive library consisting of some 900 volumes, mostly in French. It was sold in Stockholm in the year of his death 1822 with a printed catalogue. This makes him one of the first recorded book collectors of African origin.

== Legacy ==
Badin is a character in the novel Morianen by Magnus Jacob Crusenstolpe in 1838, where he was described as the participator in all the secrets and greater events of the royal family, from the revolution of 1772 to the deposition of 1809. Though this was exaggerated, it was nevertheless a more-or-less true image of him.

In 2024, a ballet about Badin's life story was created at the Royal Swedish Opera by Amir Chamdin and Pär Isberg, starring Paris Opera principal ballet dancer Guillaume Diop.

His diaries, written in French, are preserved in the library of the Uppsala University.

== See also ==
- List of slaves
- Anne of Denmark and her African servants
- Christian Hansen Ernst
- John Panzio
- Jean Amilcar
- Pehr Philander

== Literature ==
- Eric Basir: "Badin's Diary: An English Translation."
- Eric Basir: "Badin and the Secret of the Saami."
- Arvid Bergman:"Född slav-Död fri? ". 2018. Stockholmia publishing print.
