= Berufjörður =

Fjord in Iceland

Coordinates: 64°42′N 14°22′W

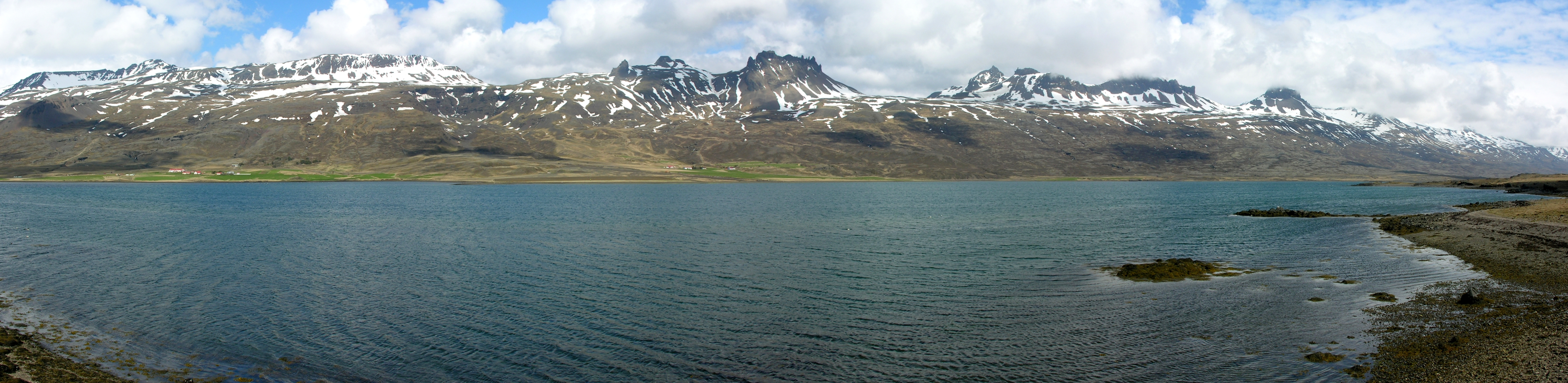
- A panorama of Berufjörður
- Interactive map of Berufjörður
- Location: Eastfjords, Iceland
- Type: Fjord
- Part of: Atlantic Ocean
- Primary inflows: Fossá
- Basin countries: Iceland
- Max. length: 20 km (12 mi)
- Max. width: 2 to 5 km (1.2 to 3.1 mi)
- Settlements: Djúpivogur

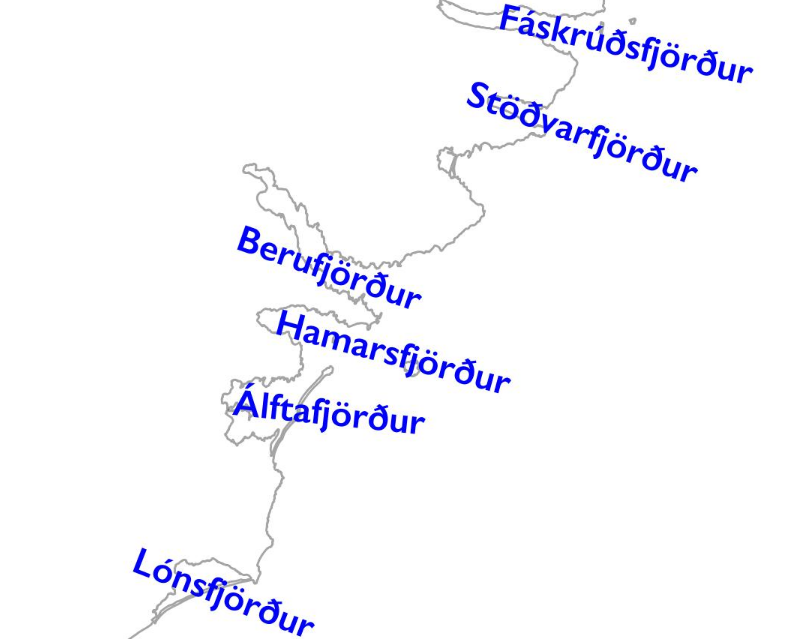
Location of Berufjörður alongside other nearby fjords and bays

Berufjörður (Icelandic pronunciation: [ˈpɛːrʏˌfjœrðʏr̥]) is a fjord in Eastern Iceland. It is about 20 kilometres (12 miles) long and 2 to 5 kilometres (1.2 to 3.1 mi) wide. The village Djúpivogur (pop. 456) is located on its western shores. Mt. Búlandstindur which is 1,069 metres (3,507 feet) above sea level is located west of the fjord. Route 1 passes on its shores.

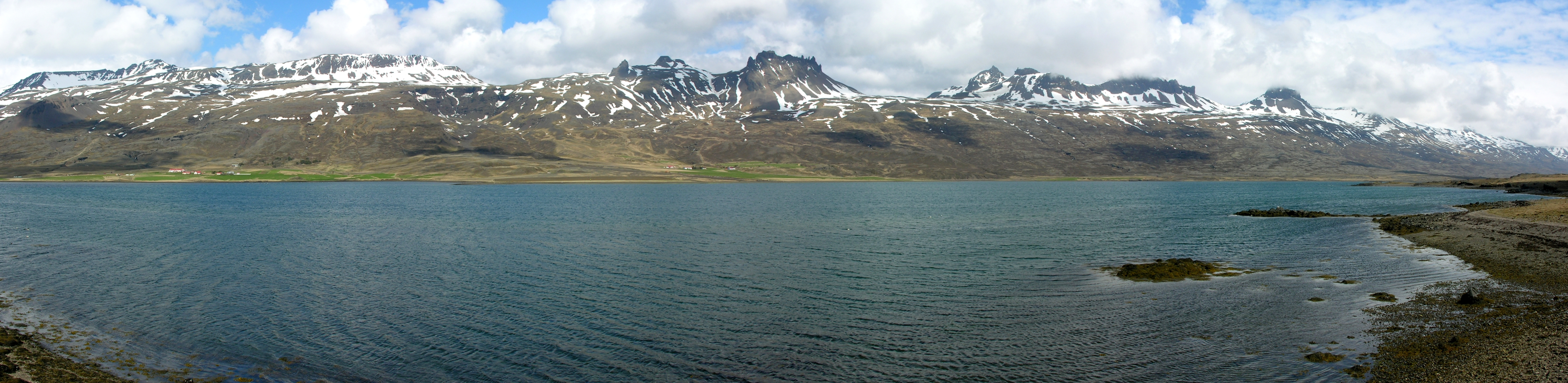
A panorama of Berufjörður

== See also ==
- Djúpivogur
- Búlandstindur
- Eastern Iceland
