= Djúpivogur =

Coordinates: 64°39′N 14°17′W

Djúpavogshreppur
- Town and former municipality
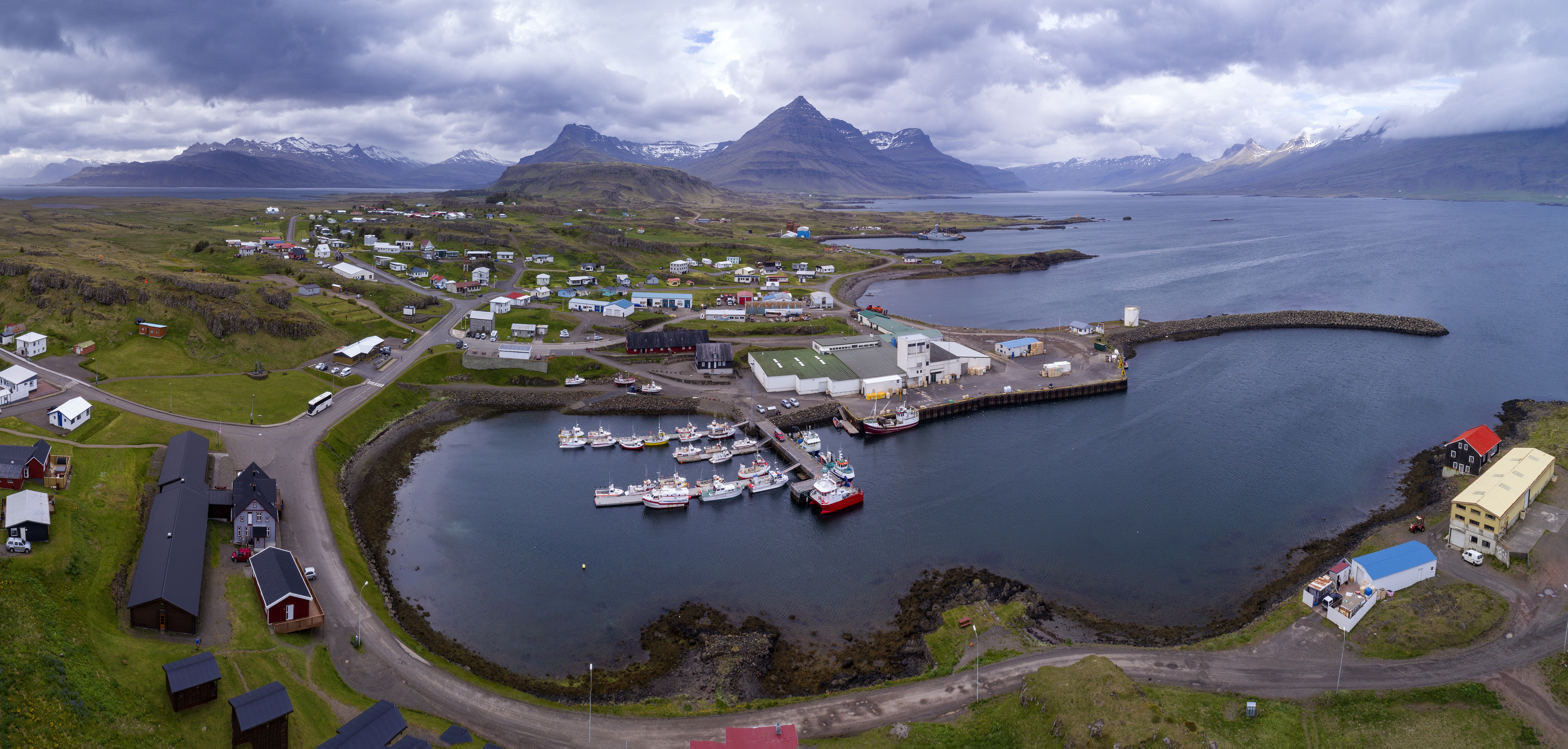
- Aerial panorama of Djúpivogur

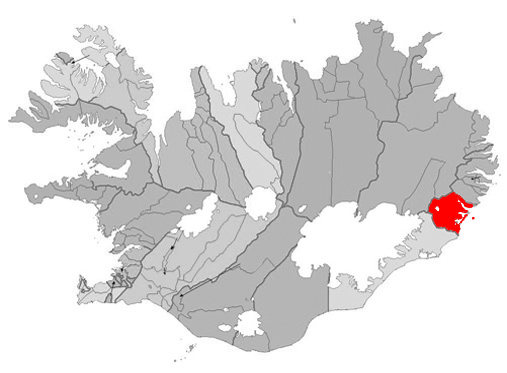
- Location of Djúpavogshreppur

- Location within Iceland
- Country: Iceland
- Region: Eastern Region
- Constituency: Northeast Constituency
- Municipality: Múlaþing

Government
  - Manager: Gauti Jóhannesson (IP)

Area
  - Total: 1,133 km^{2} (437 sq mi)

Population (2025)
  - Total: 404
  - Density: 0.357/km^{2} (0.924/sq mi)
- Postal code(s): 765
- Website: djupivogur.is

Djúpivogur (Icelandic pronunciation: [ˈtjuːpɪˌvɔːɣʏr̥]) is a small town and former municipality (Djúpavogshreppur [ˈtjuːpaˌvɔksˌr̥ɛhpʏr̥]) located on a peninsula in the Austurland region in eastern Iceland, near the island of Papey and on the fjord Berufjörður. The municipality was formed by the merger of rural communities Berunes [ˈpɛːrʏˌnɛːs], Buland [ˈpʏːlant], and Geithellur [ˈceitˌhɛtlʏr̥] on October 1, 1992. The coastline consists of three fjords Berufjörður, Hamarsfjörður [ˈhaːmar̥sˌfjœrðʏr̥], and Álftafjörður. The town of Djúpivogur is located on a peninsula between Berufjörður and Hamarsfjörður.

Approximately 900 m west of the town is a work of art named "Eggin í Gleðivík" [ˈɛcːɪn iː ˈklɛːðɪˌviːk] (The Eggs of Merry Bay) by Sigurður Guðmundsson. The work is a replica of the eggs of 34 nesting birds in the area, and was installed in the summer of 2009.

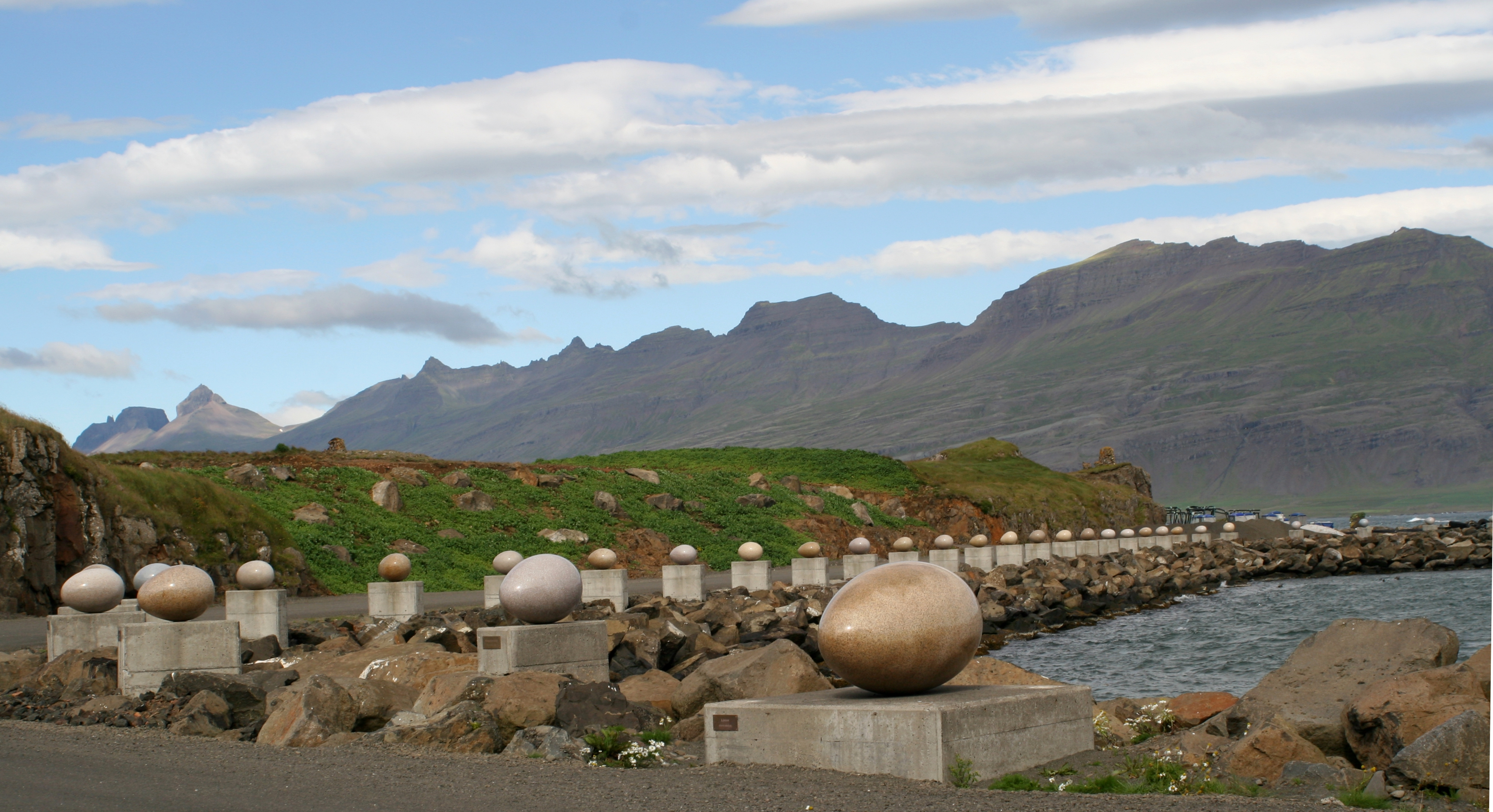
Eggin í Gleðivík (Eggs at Merry Bay) sculpture

Djúpivogur is home to Langabúð [ˈlauŋkaˌpuːθ], one of Iceland's oldest commercial buildings. The south end dates back to 1790, but the building only took on its present appearance when the northern part was constructed in 1850. Langabúð served many purposes, being a warehouse and slaughterhouse. Today, it is home to a café, the heritage museum and an exhibition on the Icelandic sculptor Ríkarður Jónsson, who was native to the village.

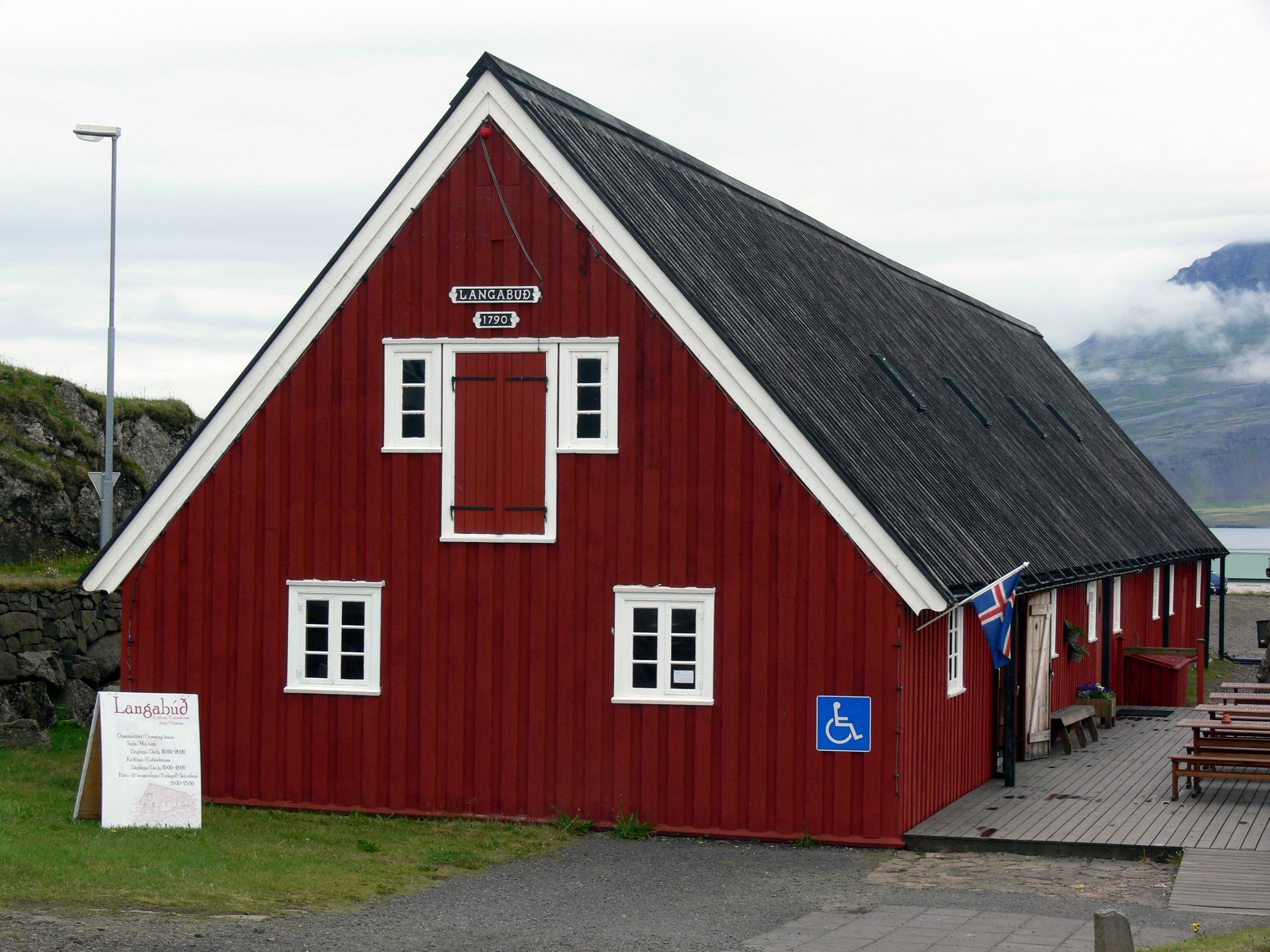
Langabúð

In 2020, the municipality of Djúpavogshreppur merged with Borgarfjarðarhreppur, Fljótsdalshérað and Seyðisfjarðarkaupstaður to form the new municipality of Múlaþing.

== Climate ==
Djúpivogur features a cold tundra climate (Köppen: ET). Approximately 5 kilometres west of Djúpivogur lies Teigarhorn [ˈtʰeiːɣarˌhɔ(r)tn̥], a farm on the shores of Berufjörður, where weather observations began in 1874. It is one of the oldest weather stations in the country and holds the record for the highest temperature ever recorded in Iceland, 30.5 °C (87 °F) recorded on June 22, 1939. It is also claimed that Teigarhorn reached 36.0 °C (97 °F) in September 1940, but that is not recognized by the Icelandic Meteorological Office. Temperatures above 30 °C (86 °F) are very rare in Iceland, and have occurred only 5 times since weather observations first began in Iceland in the 19th century. Teigarhorn features a cold tundra climate (Köppen: ET) because it does not have any month that has a mean temperature above 10 °C (50 °F), but the winter temperatures are mild for a cold tundra climate, and thus closely resembles a mild tundra climate or a subpolar oceanic climate (Cfc), the climate generally seen in coastal Iceland.

Climate data for Teigarhorn (20 m), 5 km (3.1 mi) from Djúpivogur (1961–1990)
Month	Jan	Feb	Mar	Apr	May	Jun	Jul	Aug	Sep	Oct	Nov	Dec	Year
Record high °C (°F)	16.6 (61.9)	14.1 (57.4)	16.0 (60.8)	18.2 (64.8)	24.1 (75.4)	30.5 (86.9)	26.7 (80.1)	23.6 (74.5)	23.1 (73.6)	19.3 (66.7)	17.8 (64.0)	15.0 (59.0)	30.5 (86.9)
Mean daily maximum °C (°F)	2.3 (36.1)	2.6 (36.7)	2.9 (37.2)	5.0 (41.0)	7.4 (45.3)	10.3 (50.5)	11.9 (53.4)	11.6 (52.9)	9.4 (48.9)	6.7 (44.1)	3.8 (38.8)	2.7 (36.9)	6.4 (43.5)
Daily mean °C (°F)	−0.3 (31.5)	0.2 (32.4)	0.4 (32.7)	2.2 (36.0)	4.5 (40.1)	7.3 (45.1)	8.8 (47.8)	8.8 (47.8)	6.9 (44.4)	4.4 (39.9)	1.3 (34.3)	−0.1 (31.8)	3.7 (38.7)
Mean daily minimum °C (°F)	−2.9 (26.8)	−2.5 (27.5)	−2.5 (27.5)	−0.7 (30.7)	1.9 (35.4)	4.7 (40.5)	6.3 (43.3)	6.5 (43.7)	4.4 (39.9)	2.0 (35.6)	−1.4 (29.5)	−2.9 (26.8)	1.1 (34.0)
Record low °C (°F)	−17.1 (1.2)	−18.8 (−1.8)	−19.3 (−2.7)	−22.9 (−9.2)	−8.7 (16.3)	−2.2 (28.0)	0.0 (32.0)	0.4 (32.7)	−3.2 (26.2)	−9.5 (14.9)	−11.5 (11.3)	−17.5 (0.5)	−22.9 (−9.2)
Average precipitation mm (inches)	129.0 (5.08)	109.2 (4.30)	106.8 (4.20)	70.4 (2.77)	76.8 (3.02)	71.9 (2.83)	83.8 (3.30)	109.8 (4.32)	110.1 (4.33)	151.5 (5.96)	97.8 (3.85)	111.0 (4.37)	1,228.5 (48.37)
Average precipitation days (≥ 0.1 mm)	15.5	13.6	14.6	11.6	11.6	11.5	13.1	14.7	14.2	16.6	13.5	14.0	164.9
Source: Icelandic Met Office

== History ==
By the early nineteenth century, Djúpivogur was 'a tiny port with a Danish colonial trading base'. Hans Jonatan, who had been a slave in Copenhagen, escaped there and became one of Iceland's first people of colour.

== Culture ==
Djúpivogur is the first and only Cittaslow town in Iceland. Cittaslow's goals include improving the quality of life in towns by slowing down its overall pace, especially in a city's use of spaces and the flow of life and traffic through them. Cittaslow is part of a cultural trend known as the slow movement.

== See also ==
- Æðarstein Lighthouse
