= LSL Property Services =

British residential property company

LSL Property Services plc
- Type: Public limited company
- Traded as: LSE: LSL
- Industry: Residential property
- Founded: 1980s
- Headquarters: Newcastle upon Tyne, United Kingdom
- Area served: United Kingdom
- Key people: Adrian Collins (Non Executive Chair); Adam Castleton (Chief Executive Officer)
- Revenue: ▲£182.9 million (2025)
- Operating income: ▲£22.6 million (2025)
- Net income: ▼£17.0 million (2025)
- Website: lslps.co.uk

LSL Property Services operates the Your Move and Reeds Rains estate agencies as well as e.surv Chartered Surveyors. It forms the second-largest estate agent chain in the United Kingdom.

== History ==
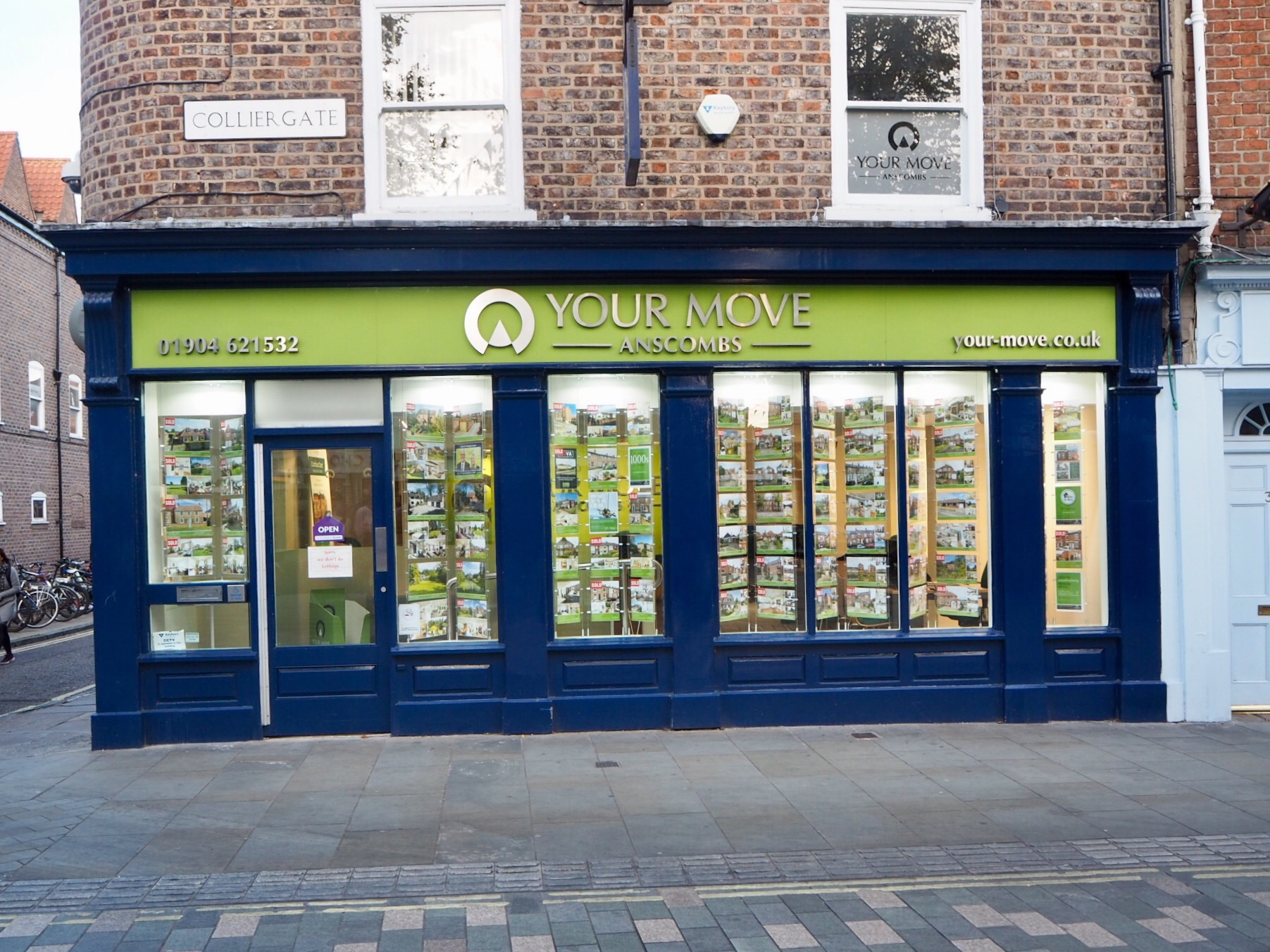
Your Move branch in Colliergate, York, UK

The business was established by General Accident in the late 1980s. By 1989, GA Property Services, latterly trading as General Accident Property Services (GAPS), owned 69 estate agencies and in 1995, the surveying division of GAPS became a separate company – GA Valuation and Survey (GAVS). Following the merger between General Accident and Commercial Union to create CGU plc in 1998, GAPS rebranded to Your Move and GAVS rebranded to e.surv Chartered Surveyors in November 1999.

Following the merger of CGU plc with Norwich Union to form Aviva in 2000, Your Move and e.surv Chartered Surveyors were declared non-core to the insurance business and were the subject of a management buyout, backed by Equistone, under a new company, Lending Solutions Limited, in July 2004.

The company acquired Reeds Rains in 2005, and became a publicly listed company on the London Stock Exchange in 2006.

In October 2006, the company underwent a rebranding exercise, changing its name from "Lending Solutions Limited" to "LSL Property Services."

The company went on to acquire Halifax Estate Agencies Limited ('HEAL') from Lloyds Banking Group for a nominal consideration of £1 in October 2009. HEAL's 218 branches, which had been built up by Halifax Building Society in the 1980s, were rebranded to other LSL brands in 2010.

In January 2023, the company sold Marsh & Parsons, a premium brand estate agency operating in Central, North West, West and South West London, to a competitor, Dexters, for approximately £29 million.

== Operations ==
The company currently operates about 183 branches across the United Kingdom, including some in a franchise format.

== Senior management ==
Simon Embley was chief executive officer from 2004. He was succeeded by Ian Crabb in 2014 and then by David Stewart in 2020. Adam Castleton, previously Chief Financial Officer, replaced David Stewart as CEO on 1 May 2025.
