= Stanley Young =

Stanley Young may refer to:

- A. Stanley Young (1876–1968), English sculptor
- Stanley Paul Young (1889–1969), American biologist
- Stanley Young (writer) (1906–1975), American playwright, author and literary critic, see Farrar, Straus and Giroux
