= Firemark =

A firemark may refer to:

- Fire insurance mark, a historical mark to identify fire brigade coverage
- Port-wine stain, a mark on the human body caused by a vascular anomaly
