= Bignold =

Bignold is a surname. Notable people with the surname include:

- Arthur Bignold (1839–1915), British politician
- Marie Bignold (1927–2018), Australian politician
- Samuel Bignold (1791–1875), British businessman
- Thomas Bignold (1761–1835), British businessman
