= Provident Mutual Life Assurance =

Defunct insurance company in Britain

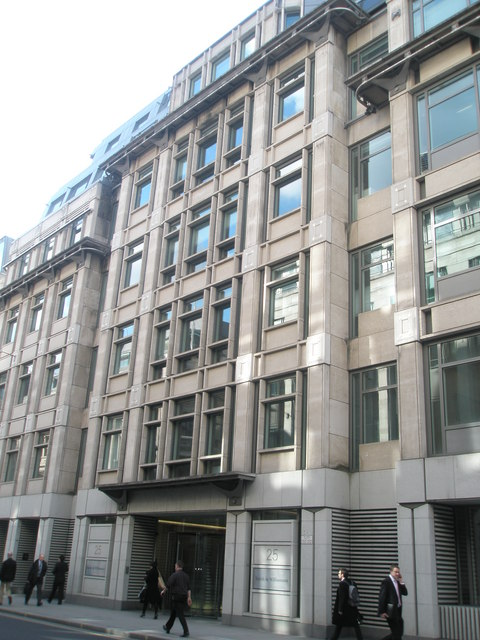
- 25 Moorgate in London
- Industry: Insurance
- Founded: 1840
- Defunct: 1995
- Fate: Acquired by General Accident
- Successor: CGU plc
- Headquarters: London
- Key people: Lord Farnham (chairman); Brian Richardson (CEO)

Provident Mutual Life Assurance was a London-based life insurance and pensions company.

== History ==
The company was established as the Provident Clerks' Mutual Benefit Association in 1840. It created the first UK-based policy against death-in-service in 1852, and introduced a system of regular payroll deductions to allow all employees to participate.

It established new offices at 25–31 Moorgate in London in 1923. The company relocated to Alresford Place near Winchester, to reduce the risk to its staff from air raids by the Luftwaffe, in June 1939, during the Second World War.

It had some 500,000 policy holders in 1995, when it was acquired by General Accident in a deal worth £170 million.
