= Sabre Insurance =

- Company type: Public
- Traded as: LSE: SBRE
- Industry: Insurance
- Founded: 1982; 44 years ago
- Headquarters: Dorking, Surrey
- Key people: Rebecca Shelley, (Chair); Geoff Carter (CEO)
- Revenue: ▼£218.0million (2025)
- Operating income: ▲£51.0 million (2025)
- Net income: ▲£37.9million (2025)
- Website: www.sabreplc.co.uk

Sabre Insurance is an insurer specialising in the car, van and motorbike insurance market. It is listed on the London Stock Exchange.

== History ==
Sabre Insurance was originally established as an underwriting agency for Crusader Insurance and Royal Insurance in 1982.

It was acquired by General Accident in 1996 and became part of CGU in 1998 and of Aviva in 2000, through a series of insurance sector mergers, before being the subject of a management buyout led by Keith Morris and Angus Ball, supported by BDML Group, in 2002.

In September 2013, private equity firm BC Partners acquired a controlling interest in the business, enabling further growth.

The company launched an initial public offering on the London Stock Exchange in December 2017.

BC Partners sold its investment in the company in September 2018.

In July 2024, Sabre launched its "Ambition 2030" strategy, which identified opportunities for additional growth.

== Activities ==
The company specialises in the unpopular parts of the car insurance market using brands which include Go Girl, Insure2Drive and offers motorbike insurance through Sabre Direct.
