= Jack Eddison =

England international rugby union player

Jack Eddison MC
- Full name: John Horncastle Eddison
- Born: 25 August 1888 Edinburgh, Scotland
- Died: 18 November 1982 (aged 94) Edinburgh, Scotland

Rugby union career
- Position: Forward
International career
| Years | Team | Apps | (Points) |
| 1912 | England | 4 | (3) |

John Horncastle Eddison (25 August 1888 – 18 November 1982) was an English international rugby union player.

Born in Edinburgh, Scotland, Eddison grew up in Yorkshire, where his parents were from.

Eddison, a forward, played his rugby for Leeds club Headingley and represented Yorkshire, including for a match against the 1908–09 Wallabies. He was capped in all four of England's matches in 1912 Five Nations Championship.

An officer in the Royal Field Artillery, Eddison was mentioned in dispatches and awarded a Military Cross.

Eddison worked for North British and Mercantile Insurance and became their Manager for Scotland.

== See also ==
- List of England national rugby union players
