= 49–50 Fleet Street =

Edwardian former office building in London

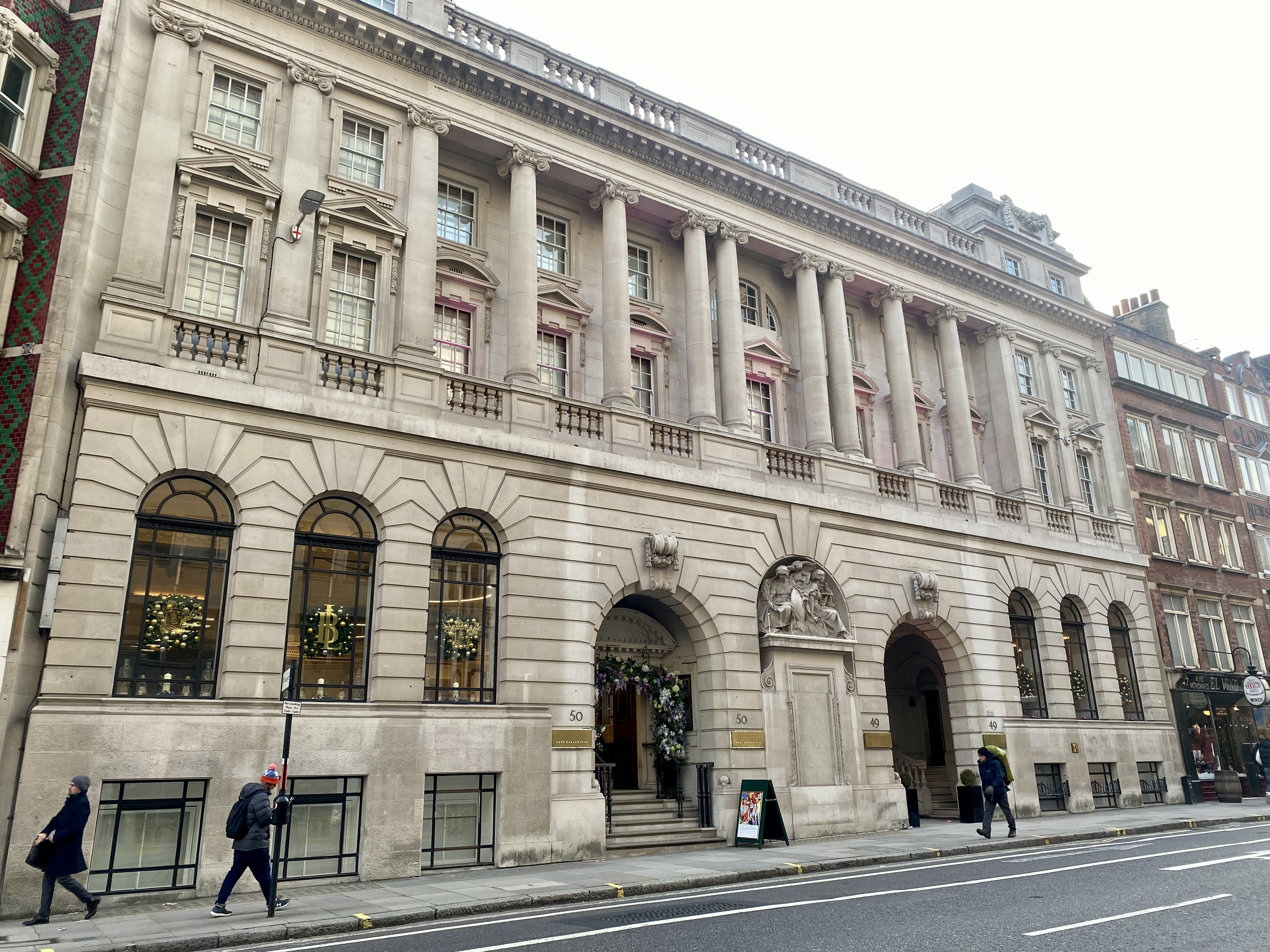
- 49–50 Fleet Street

General information
- Type: Office, now hotel
- Architectural style: Edwardian baroque
- Location: London, England
- Coordinates: 51°30′50″N 0°06′32″W
- Completed: 1911

Design and construction
- Architect: Jack McMullen Brooks

Listed Building – Grade II
- Official name: 49 AND 50, FLEET STREET EC4
- Designated: 10 November 1977
- Reference no.: 1064695

49–50 Fleet Street sometimes called the Norwich Union Insurance Building is a Grade II listed Edwardian former office block that stands on Fleet Street in the City of London.

== History ==
The building's site was formerly was formerly occupied by part of Serjeant's Inn. The Great Fire of London caused the destruction of a number of buildings. Founded in 1707, the Amicable Society is often considered the first life insurance company in the world. The society was allowed to move into 50 Fleet Street after purchasing the lease in the 1730s, building their own office on the site to a design by architect Robert Adam. The freehold owners, the Deans and Chapter of York and Canterbury, sold it to the Amicable Society in 1838 following financial difficulties from a fire lit by an arsonist at York Minster. In 1866, the Amicable Society and subsequently 50 Fleet Street was acquired by the Norwich Union.

The Norwich Union bought nos. 48, 49 and 51 prior to the widening of Fleet Street to make space for a larger block. The current building was built in 1911, designed by architect Jack McMullens Brooks. In 2018, 49–50 Fleet Street completed its conversion to an extension of the Apex Hotel occupying buildings to its immediate south in 2012. The hotel had been opened in the former buildings of Serjeant's Inn which were rebuilt by the Norwich Union in 1954 in a neo-georgian style following bomb damage during The Blitz.

== Architecture ==
The building is in an elaborate Edwardian Baroque style. The long facade has robust rusticated ground floor surmounted by a screen of columns. The front has two entrance archways, the one on the left leading into the building and the one on the right is a gateway to the former Serjeant's Inn buildings. The central niche holds a sculpture by Stanley Young, Prudence, Justice and Liberality; an allegorical work, representing both the company and the nearby Serjeant's Inn. A writer of the in-house magazine of Norwich Union wrote of the sculpture:

I can imagine many a printer’s devil envying the innocent child pouring out the fruit and money, and the delicately veiled lady with a sword turning her back on it all. We may suppose that Prudence has a premium ledger somewhere about her, otherwise the sculpture does not represent the business.

Nikolaus Pevnser in his London Guides described it as an "attractive Baroque composition". The building was given Grade II listed status in 1977. It is also part of the Fleet Street conservation area, a report by the City of London Corporation in 2016 echoed Pevsner's praise, describing it as an "accomplished Baroque composition".
