= Commercial Union =

English insurance company (1861–1998)

- Type: Public
- Industry: Insurance
- Founded: 21 September 1861
- Defunct: 2 June 1998
- Fate: Merged with General Accident
- Successor: CGU plc
- Headquarters: 23-27 Cornhill, City of London

Commercial Union plc was a large insurance business based in London. It merged with General Accident in 1998 to form CGU plc.

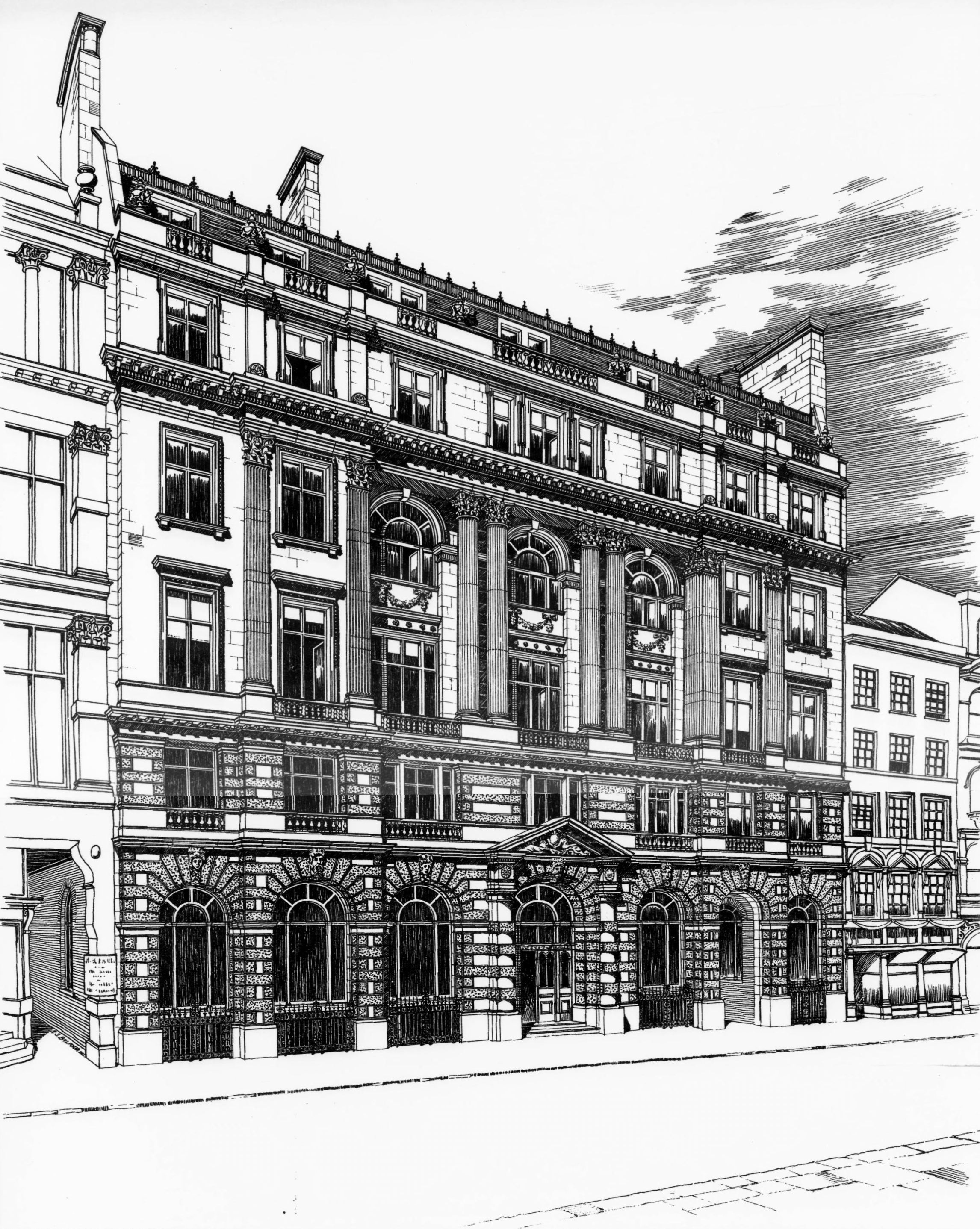
The 1895 head office on Cornhill, designed by John Macvicar Anderson. In 1927 it collapsed partially during the construction of Lloyds Bank, and was demolished thereafter.

== History ==
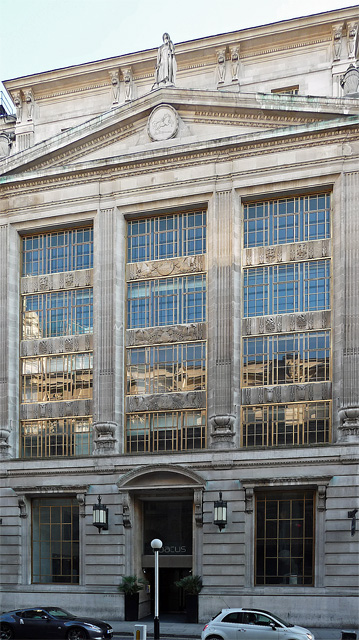
The 1929 replacement headquarters, designed by Maurice Webb

Commercial Union was established following a conflagration near London Bridge in 1861, known as the Great Tooley Street Fire, which destroyed a number of warehouses and wharves along the River Thames as a result of which the fire insurance companies were hit by a series of massive claims. Consequently, they increased their fire insurance rates so dramatically that a group of local merchants and brokers decided to form their own company. This became known as the Commercial Union Assurance Company. The company established its head office at 24–26 Cornhill in London in 1897.

It purchased the Hand in Hand Fire & Life Insurance Society, the world's oldest fire insurance company, in 1905 and The Ocean Accident and Guarantee Corporation in 1910 and it continued to grow by further acquisitions.

The acquisition of the British General Insurance Company followed in 1926. Then, after completing the acquisition of North British and Mercantile Insurance, which had significant operations in the United States, in 1959, Commercial Union moved to larger and more modern facilities at St. Helen's in London in 1969.

With the intention of expanding its activities in continental Europe, it acquired the Dutch insurance business, Delta Lloyd Group, in 1973 and the French insurance business, L'Epargne de France in 1984.

The company merged with General Accident to form CGU plc in 1998.

== Coat of arms ==
The College of Arms granted the following coat of arms to the Commercial Union:

Coat of arms of Commercial Union
Granted 14 November 1928 Escutcheon Sable, a fire beacon and on a chief Or three anchors azure. Supporters On either side a winged lion guardant collared Or. Motto Anchora salutis
