= Serjeant's Inn =

Legal inn of the Serjeants-at-Law in London

Coordinates: 51.5137°N 0.1090°W

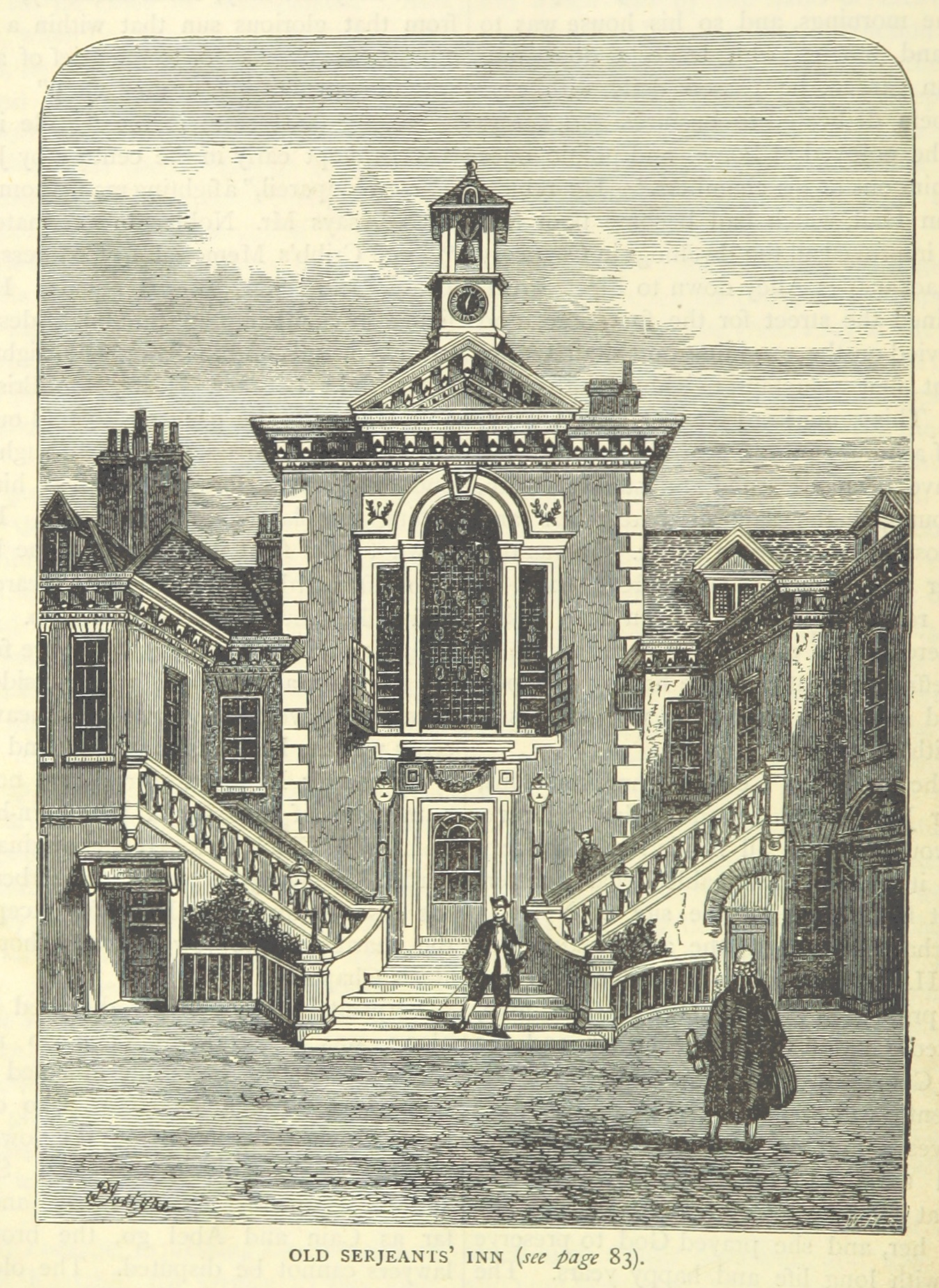
Serjeants' Inn, off Chancery Lane, in the early 1800s

Serjeant's Inn (formerly Serjeants' Inn) was the legal inn of the Serjeants-at-Law in London. Originally there were two separate societies of Serjeants-at-law: the Fleet Street inn dated from 1443 and the Chancery Lane inn dated from 1416. In 1730, the Fleet Street lease was not renewed and the two societies merged. The society's relevance diminished as Serjeants-at-Law were gradually superseded by Queen's Counsel in the nineteenth century. The building in Chancery Lane was sold in 1877 and the assets were distributed amongst the surviving members, although the society was not formally dissolved. The last member, Lord Lindley, died in 1921. (A. M. Sullivan, who died in 1959, was appointed to the equivalent Irish office in 1912, when the English society had effectively dissolved.) The Fleet Street building was destroyed in the 1941 bombing raids during World War II.

== Fleet Street site today ==
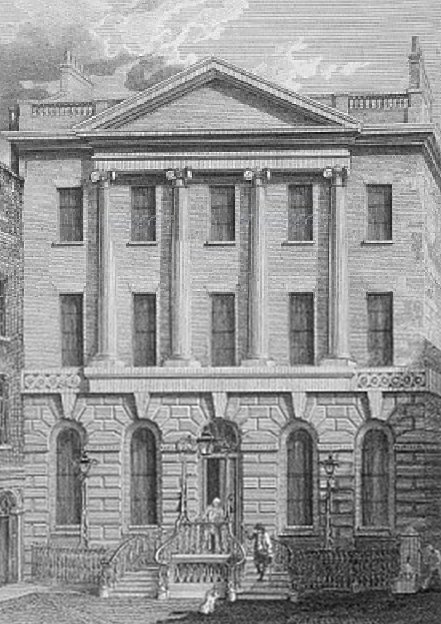
The Amicable Society offices at 50 Fleet Street in 1801. Now occupied by 49-50 Fleet Street

The lease of the site of the former Serjeants' Inn on Fleet Street was taken on in 1737 by the Amicable Society for a Perpetual Assurance Office, the first life insurance company in the world, who raised a new building on the site in 1792–93, designed by Robert Adam. The site was redeveloped after the destruction of this building in the Second World War, but retained its name and a physical connection with the Inns of Court, since the modern buildings, although commercially occupied, stand around a small courtyard used for parking which connects to the Inner Temple through an archway which allows pedestrian access.

That site is now, therefore, effectively part of the precincts of the Inner Temple and the wider legal area of the Temple. Moreover, in 2001 the Inner Temple acquired the freehold from its former commercial occupiers. The Inner Temple announced its intention to use the space for barristers' chambers, like those in the Inner Temple itself. However, in March 2008 it informed its members that both refurbishment and rebuilding for this purpose had proved to be financially unviable, and that it had therefore granted a long lease for hotel premises at 1–2 Serjeants' Inn to recover its acquisition costs. The Apex Temple Court Hotel opened in March 2012.

No. 3 Serjeant's Inn has been a barristers' chambers, occupying commercial premises, since 1986. Mitre Court, which connects the Inner Temple area, Serjeants' Inn and Fleet Street, has been home to barristers' chambers since at least the 1970s.

== See also ==
- List of demolished buildings and structures in London
