= Willing House =

Edwardian former office building in London

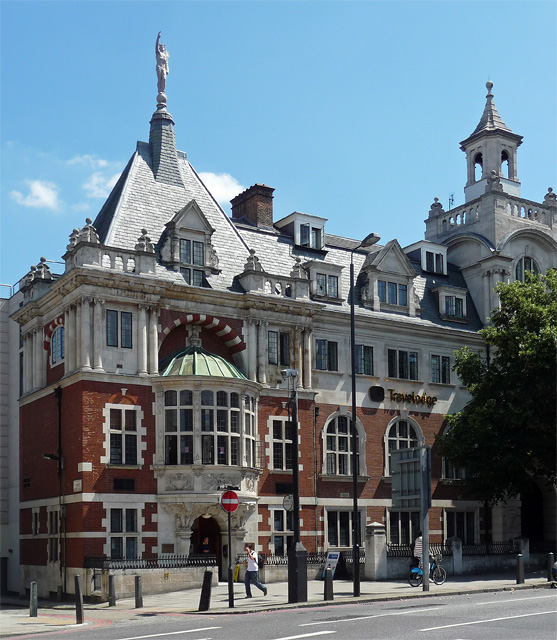
- Willing House

General information
- Type: Office, now hotel
- Architectural style: Edwardian
- Location: London, England
- Coordinates: 51°31′49″N 0°07′13″W
- Completed: 1910

Design and construction
- Architects: Hart & Waterhouse

Listed Building – Grade II
- Official name: Willing House and Attached Wall With Railings
- Designated: 14 May 1974
- Reference no.: 1113190

Willing House is an Edwardian former office building that stands on Gray's Inn Road in London. The building is Grade II listed for its historic and architectural interest.

== Description ==
Willing House was built in 1910 for the Messrs Willing advertising firm. It was designed by Alfred Henry Hart and Percy Leslie Waterhouse, using a mix of Edwardian baroque and Tudor style elements in their design. The design incorporates carvings by William Aumonier and the statue of Mercury on its roof by A. Stanley Young. In 2003, the building was converted into a hotel.
