= Viewlands House =

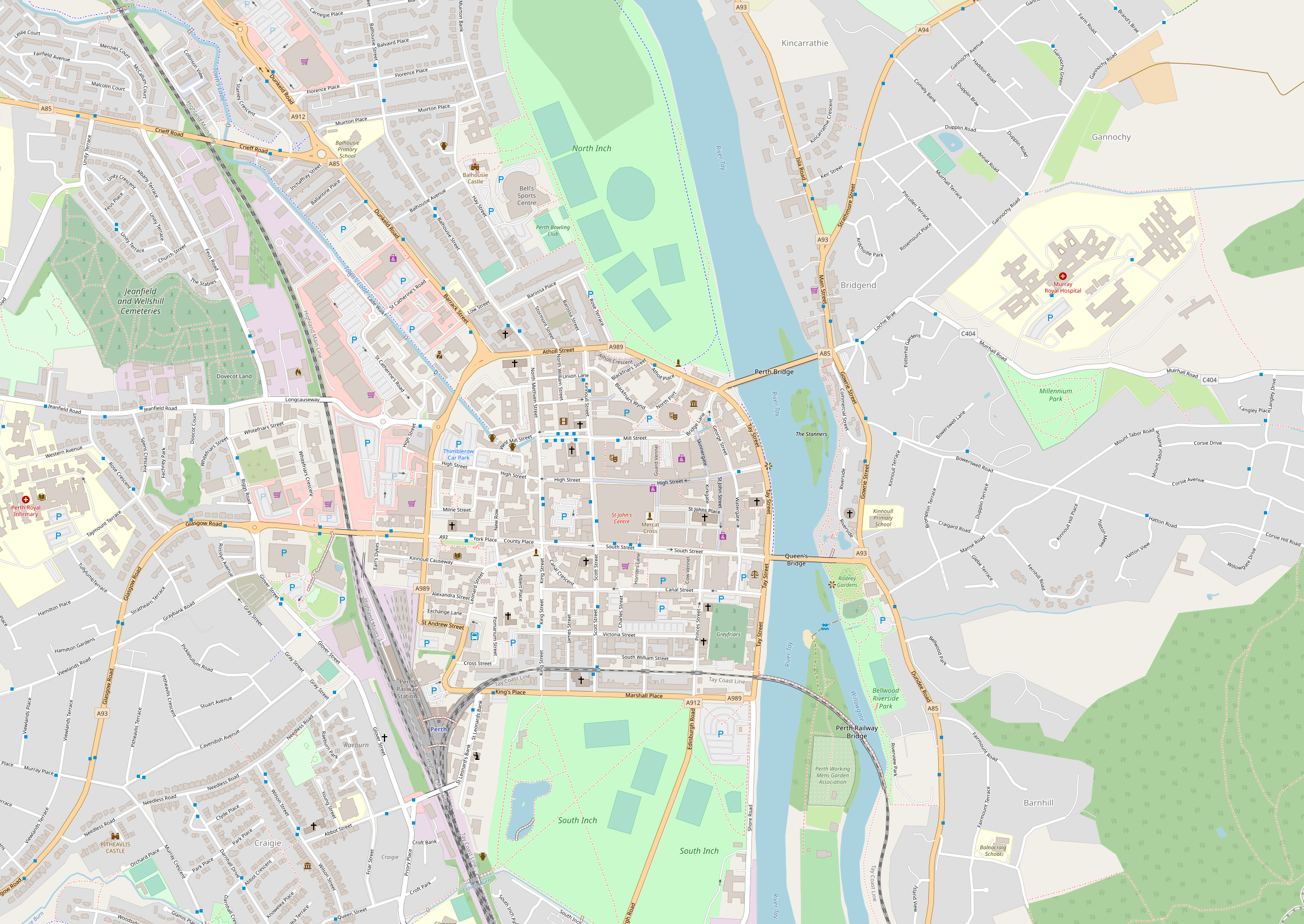
- Shown in Perth
- 56.392277°N 3.455608°W
- Location: 25 Viewlands Road; Perth; Perth and Kinross; Scotland

History
- Built: c. 1840

Listed Building – Category B
- Designated: 26 August 1987
- Reference no.: LB39660

Viewlands House is an historic building in the Viewlands area immediately to the west of the centre of Perth, Perth and Kinross, Scotland. Located on Viewlands Road, it is a Category B listed building, built around 1840. One of its main features is its Ionic order-columned porch with balustraded parapet. A twelve-room extension was added in 1997, bringing the building's total up to 32.

Formerly a training college for Perth-based General Accident Assurance Corporation, it is now an Abbeyfield retirement home.

== See also ==
- List of listed buildings in Perth, Scotland
