= Henry Young (founder) =

English bronze founder

Richard Henry Young
- Born: 1842; Skipton, Yorkshire, England
- Died: 1 February 1929 (aged 86–87); England
- Occupations: Bronze founder and foundry owner, engineer

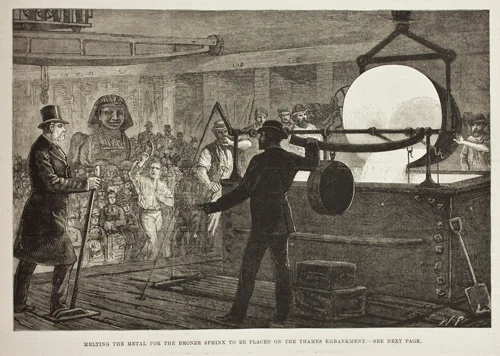
Illustration showing the casting of a sphinx for Cleopatra's Needle in the llustrated London News, 16 April 1881.

Richard Henry Young (1842 – 1 February 1929) usually known simply as Henry Young was an English bronze founder. He established H. Young & Co, a significant foundry in the development of British sculpture in the 19th century. He has been described as England's "first major art-bronze founder of modern times".

== Personal life ==
Henry Young was born in Skipton, Yorkshire in 1842, the son of moulder Richard Young. The young family lived primarily in Manchester where Henry Young grew up before moving to London in 1861. Young married Fanny Brass in 1868 with whom he had several children including sculptor Arthur Stanley Young. Henry Young died on 1 February 1929.

== H. Young & Co. ==
Henry Young worked under Holbrook & Co, heading the moulding department. In 1871, he was able to establish his art bronze foundry at Eccleston Ironworks in Pimlico. Young had managed to attract Alfred Stevens, in need of bronze parts for his Wellington Monument in St Paul's Cathedral, as a customer of his newly established foundry. Hugh Stannus, assistant to Stevens, recounted that the latter had an admiration for Young, helping him in acquiring the job. The contract caused issue for Young however when Stevens did not deliver models for casting in time, with Young facing a loss of £4000.

The foundry continued in its success and gained in popularity. In the 1870s it came to be seen as something of a social centre of the London art World. In addition to Stevens, customers included, according to H. Young & Co., Joseph Edgar Boehm, Matthew Noble, Charles Bacon, Theodore Phyffers and possibly Edward Bowring Stephens. In 1875, Boehm praised the foundry as a demonstration of the rise of bronze-moulding in England. It allowed him to have sculptures cast in London where previously he had to look to Paris, Berlin or Vienna. The foundry added the inclusion bridge building within their activities in 1879.

Young's foundry preceded a number of successful foundries such as that at Cox & Sons at Thames Ditton (1875), as well as those of John Webb Singer in Frome (1888) and George Broad in Hammersmith (1890). The competition from these new firms would lead to a downfall in the foundry's output. Young's involvement is certain until at least 1911, and it was sold to Murray Buxton in 1925.

=== Works ===
The foundry completed a number of sculptures and statues in the 1870s, with a number of Boehm's works produced by the firm. Among the foundry's most notable works were the sphinxes set up next to Cleopatra's Needle in 1881. Praised in the press for being cast in one go, as opposed to the multiple pieces for Marochetti's lions at the base of Nelson's Column which had been cast 14 years before. The foundry also advertised the dolphin lamp standards for the Victoria Embankment, although it is not clear they produced any, with Masefield & Co. the main casters.
