= A. Stanley Young =

English sculptor

Arthur Stanley Young
- Born: 1876; Chelsea, London, England
- Died: 1968 (aged 91–92); England
- Known for: Sculpture

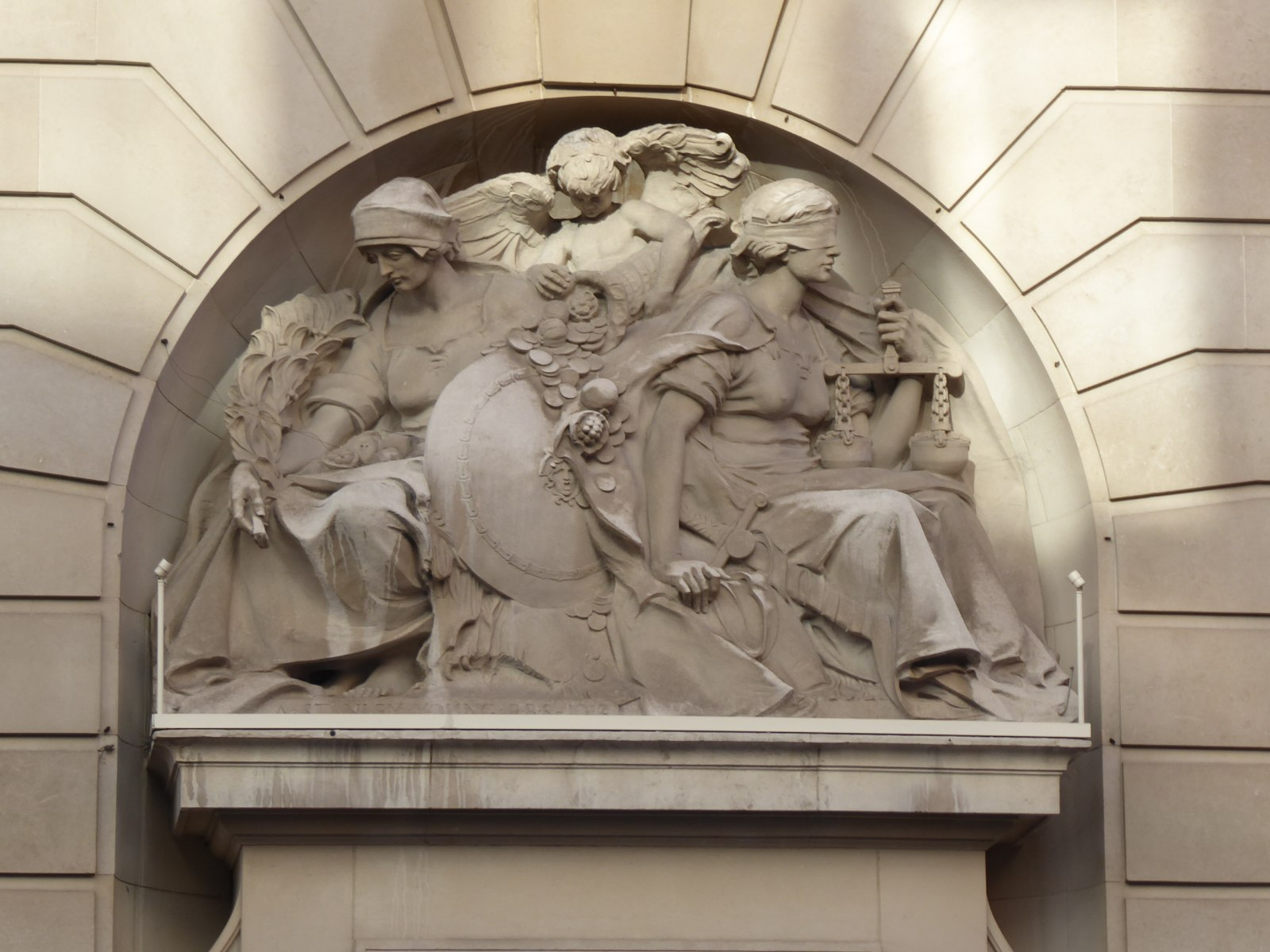
Stanley Young's Prudence, Justice and Liberality, a work for the Norwich Union's offices at 49–50 Fleet Street.

Arthur Stanley Young (1876–1968) was an English sculptor, primarily known for his architectural sculpture.

== Biography ==
Arthur Stanley Young was born in Chelsea in 1876 to Richard Henry Young, a bronze founder and engineer. He was generally known by Stanley Young or A. Stanley Young.

Stanley Young's artistic training involved studying at the Royal Academy Schools where he received a Landseer scholarship in 1899. During his studies, he produced the headstone for the tomb of the Brass Family which stands in Brompton Cemetery.

In 1902 Young entered Boadicea urging the Britons to avenge her outraged daughters in the Royal Academy School's competition which was illustrated in The Studio. Young worked with the Norwich Union to produce works for their buildings in Norwich and on Fleet Street in London. He also provided the figure of Mercury for Willing House on Gray's Inn Road.
