= Reeds Rains =

UK estate agency

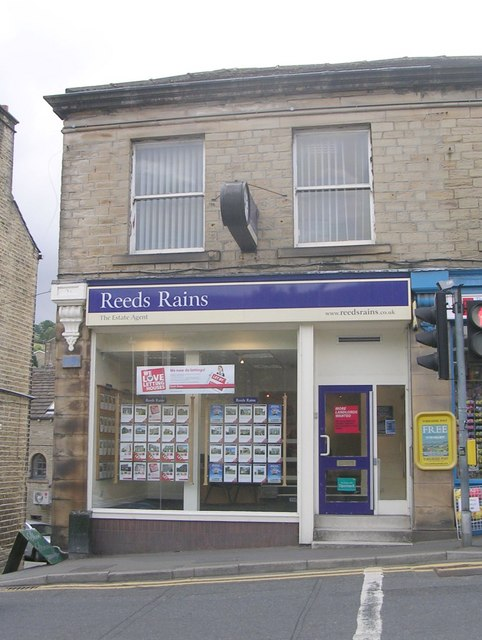
- Branch in West Yorkshire, UK
- Industry: Residential property
- Founded: 1868
- Headquarters: Manchester, United Kingdom
- Area served: United Kingdom

Reeds Rains is an estate agency operating in the UK. The firm has its origins in two companies; Samuel Rains and Son and Reeds. It was acquired by LSL Property Services in 2005 and was, at that time, the largest firm of estate agents in the north of England.

== History ==
Samuel Rains and Sons was established by its namesake; Samuel Rains in Manchester in 1868. The office moved to The Crescent, Cheadle in 1946 after World War II. The firm was strongly established as a family business and by the time the company celebrated is Centenary in 1968, Rains' three great-grandchildren were partners in the firm. Michael Gass joined the company as a fourth partner and at this point Samuel Rains and Sons boasted a chain of five branches. By the time of the merger with Reeds, the company operated twenty five branches.

The firm of Reeds had its roots in a firm established in Preston in 1870 by a George Wrightson. After his death in 1890, his assistant Edward Reed took over the business. As with Samuel Rains and Sons, the company was a family business and after the World War I, Harold and George Reed (Edward's sons) joined the company. They sold the firm to Basil Crosley in 1956 and by 1972 Crosley had expanded the business to comprise four partners including his own son John. The name of the company was changed to Reeds and further branches were acquired through a merger with the firm of Petty and Co in 1976. By the time of their merger with Samuel Rains and Sons, Reeds operated sixteen branches.

The two firms merged in 1982 and the large logistical task of renaming the offices and replacing over five hundred for sale boards was complete within two weeks. The name of the merged firm was decided by the flip of a coin. The business grew rapidly, and used innovative marketing techniques such as television advertising on local ITV station Granada.

In 1986 the fifty-two strong chain was purchased by the financial services company; Prudential, for £24 million. The Reeds Rains name was re-established following a £3.4 million management buyout in 1991 and the firm set about expanding once again, including the purchase of Britannia Building Society's estate agency in November 1998.

Reeds Rains was purchased by LSL Property Services in October 2005. At that time it had 130 branches across Northern England and North Wales and it was the largest firm of estate agents in the north of England.

In May 2023, LSL Property Service franchised all estate agency branches across their brands, including all the Reeds Rains branches.
