= Fire insurance mark =

Metal plaques

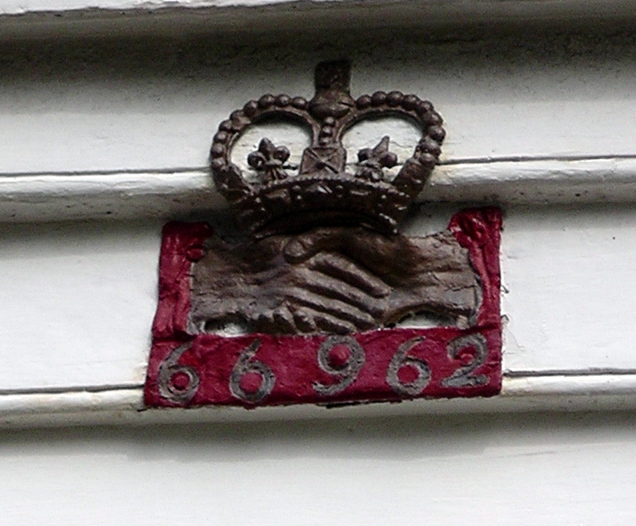
Fire mark of the Hand in Hand Fire & Life Insurance Society on a house in Dulwich

Fire insurance marks are metal plaques marked with the emblem of the insurance company which were affixed to the front of insured buildings as a guide to the insurance company's fire brigade. These identification marks were used in the eighteenth and nineteenth century in the days before municipal fire services were formed. The UK marks are called 'fire insurance plaques'.

The first to use the mark was the Sun Fire Office which was established in 1710. Some period specimens remain on historical buildings in the older areas of Britain's and America's cities and larger towns. Cast metal plaques were made of iron, lead, or sometimes brass. Embossed sheet metal signs were also made, as well as flat enamel signs – the latter mostly in Continental Europe in the later 19th century.

Period specimens may have high value among antiques collectors, leading to illicit creation of fakes. Also, nostalgic reproductions have been made since the early 20th century for decorative purposes.

== By location ==
=== British ===
For most of the 18th century, each insurance company maintained its own fire brigade, which extinguished fires in those buildings insured by the company and, in exchange for a fee to be paid later, in buildings insured by other companies. By 1825, fire marks served more as advertisements than as useful identifying marks; some insurance companies no longer issued fire marks, and those that did sometimes left them up after a policy had expired. Successive combinations of fire brigades led to virtually the entire city of London being put under the protection of the London Fire Engine Establishment, which fought not only the fires of policy holders but those of nonsubscribers, the reason being that fires in uninsured buildings could rapidly spread to insured buildings. The Museum of English Rural Life has a collection of 100 fire insurance marks from around England.

An urban myth around fire marks claimed that if a building was not insured with the fire mark of a particular fire brigade or a company they had a reciprocal agreement with, they would let the building burn. However, following a review of contemporary evidence, it has been argued that this was not the case in the vast majority of fire incidents, and fire brigades would attempt to extinguish any fire regardless of insurance status due to threats to nearby structures, financial incentives and the publicity it gained.

=== American ===
Fire insurance has over 200 years of history in America. The early fire marks of Benjamin Franklin's time can still be seen on some Philadelphia buildings as well as in other older American cities. Subscribers paid firefighting companies in advance for fire protection and in exchange would receive a fire mark to attach to their building. The payments for the fire marks supported the firefighting companies. Volunteer fire departments were also common in the United States, and some fire insurers contributed money to these departments and awarded bonuses to the first fire engine arriving at the scene of a fire.

=== Australian ===
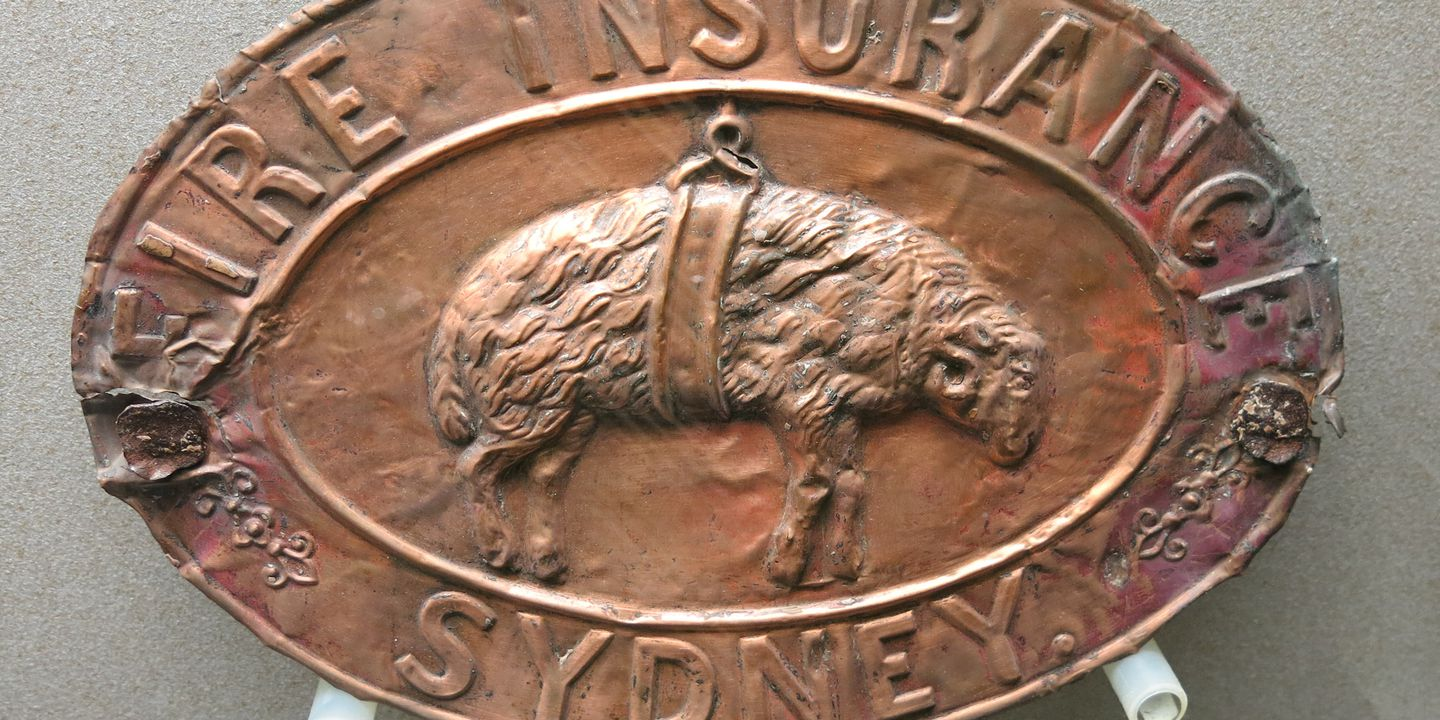
Copper mould of the golden fleece fire mark, Fire Insurance Company Sydney

Fire insurance companies began operating in the Australian colonies in the early part of the 19th century. Some were based in Australia or Britain, while others were foreign-owned. The Union Assurance Company of Sydney and The Australasian Fire and Life Assurance Company are both recorded as having offices in George Street, Sydney in 1836. The Sydney Fire Insurance Company was established in 1844 at 468 George Street Sydney. It issued for display at the company’s fire insured properties a mark in copper with the company name with the image of a golden fleece, being at that time in the New South Wales colony a symbol of safety and security. A rare and original plaque from the 1840s is on display at the historic Darling House, The Rocks, the current property having been constructed in this colonial precinct 1842. In Melbourne, the Collingwood Fire Insurance Company (with a paid up capital of 200 000 pounds) was operating in Gertude Street, Collingwood, Victoria, in 1854.

Fire brigades in metropolitan areas were organised much along the same lines as in the United Kingdom and the United States and were funded by the insurance companies. Likewise the companies issued fire marks to be affixed to buildings to indicate where there were risks for which they had underwritten policies. Such fire marks were commonly made of tinplate, cast iron and lead.

At least one company, the Norwich Union, issued "fire marks" printed on calico for use in rural areas. They were to be fixed on hay ricks, corn stacks and shearing sheds on the theory that they would indicate to arsonists that the owner was insured and would not be out of pocket should the property be destroyed by fire.

One feature of the insurance company funding of fire brigades survives in some Australian states and territories in the 21st century in that the fire brigade services are principally funded by a "fire service levy" or tax applied to all property insurance policies issued within a state.

== Styles and materials ==
Examples showing the various fabrication methods

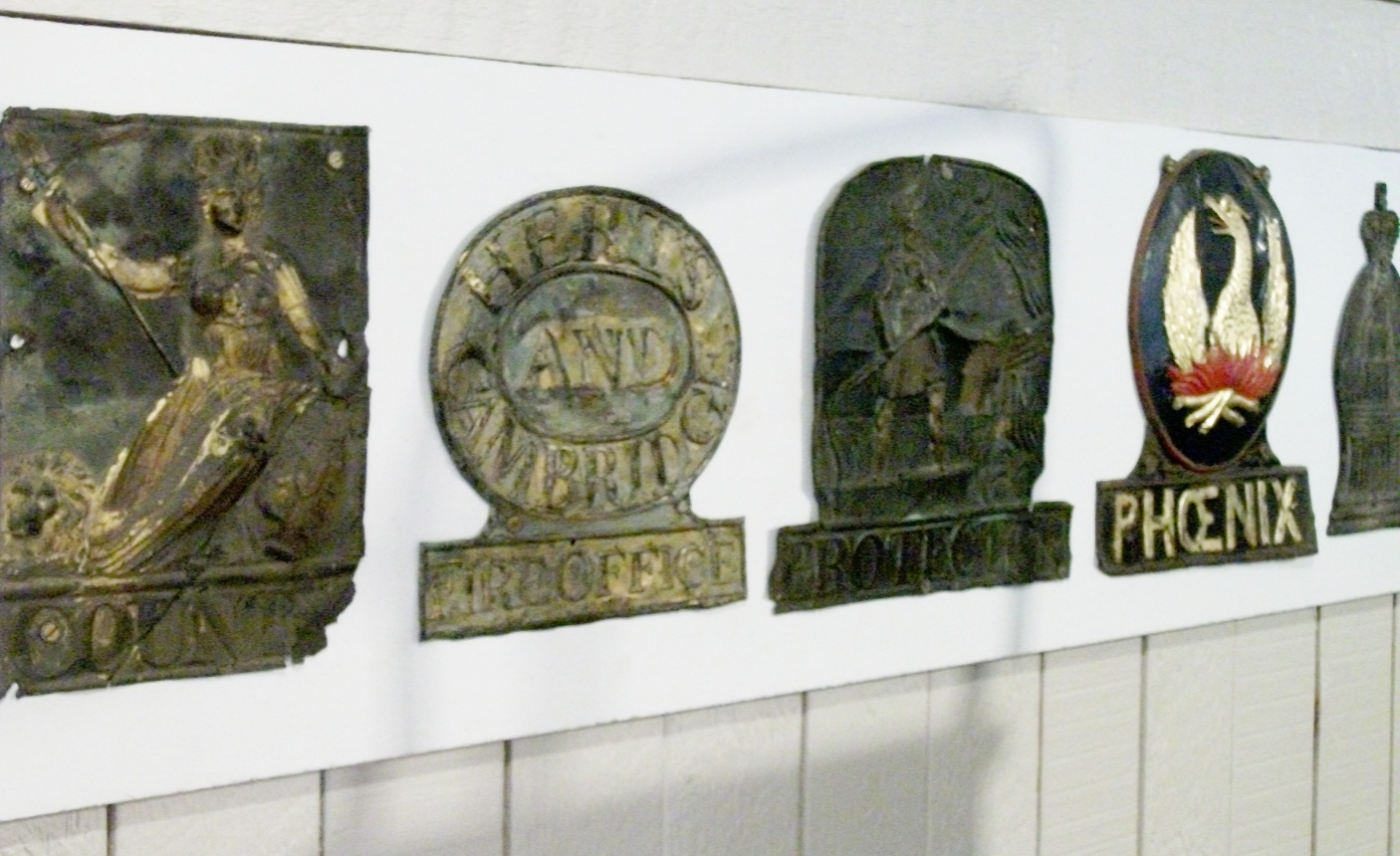
Embossed sheet metal British specimens in a museum exhibit

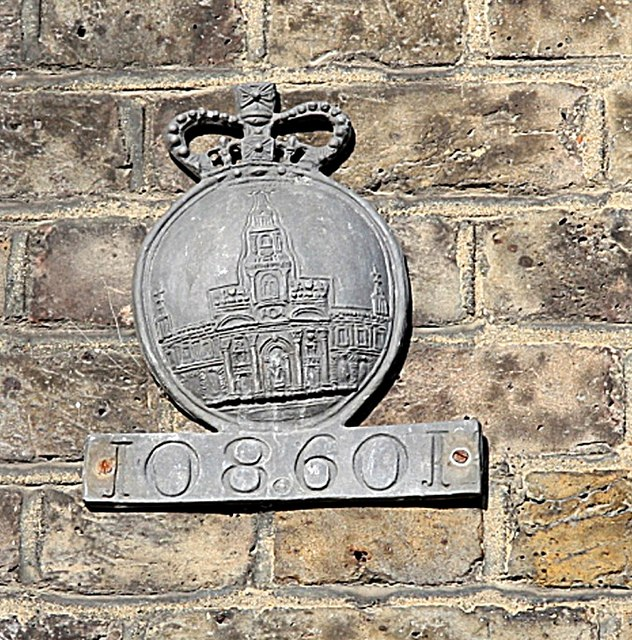
Cast lead British fire mark with stamped serial number

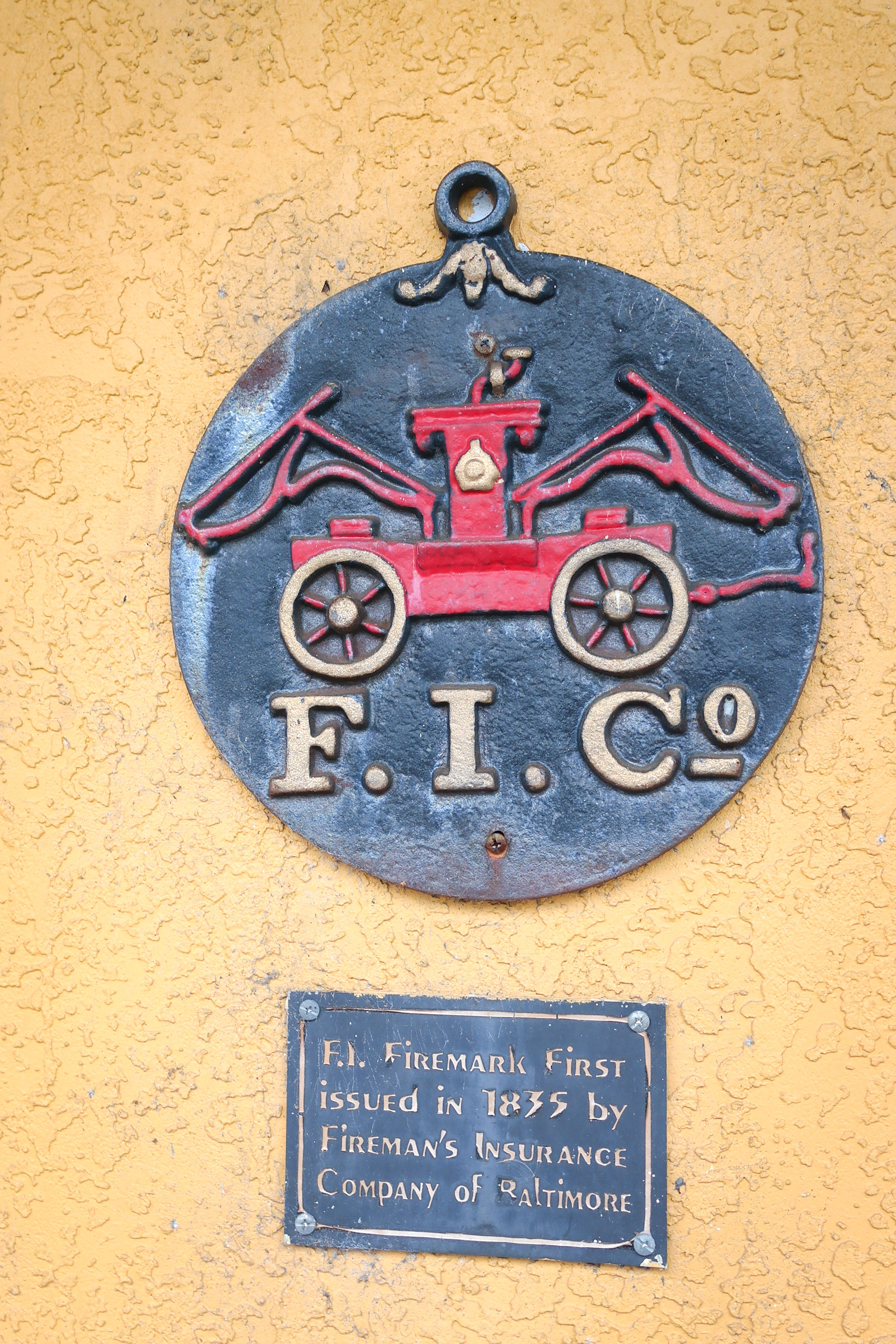
A classic American design in painted cast iron, likely a decorative reproduction

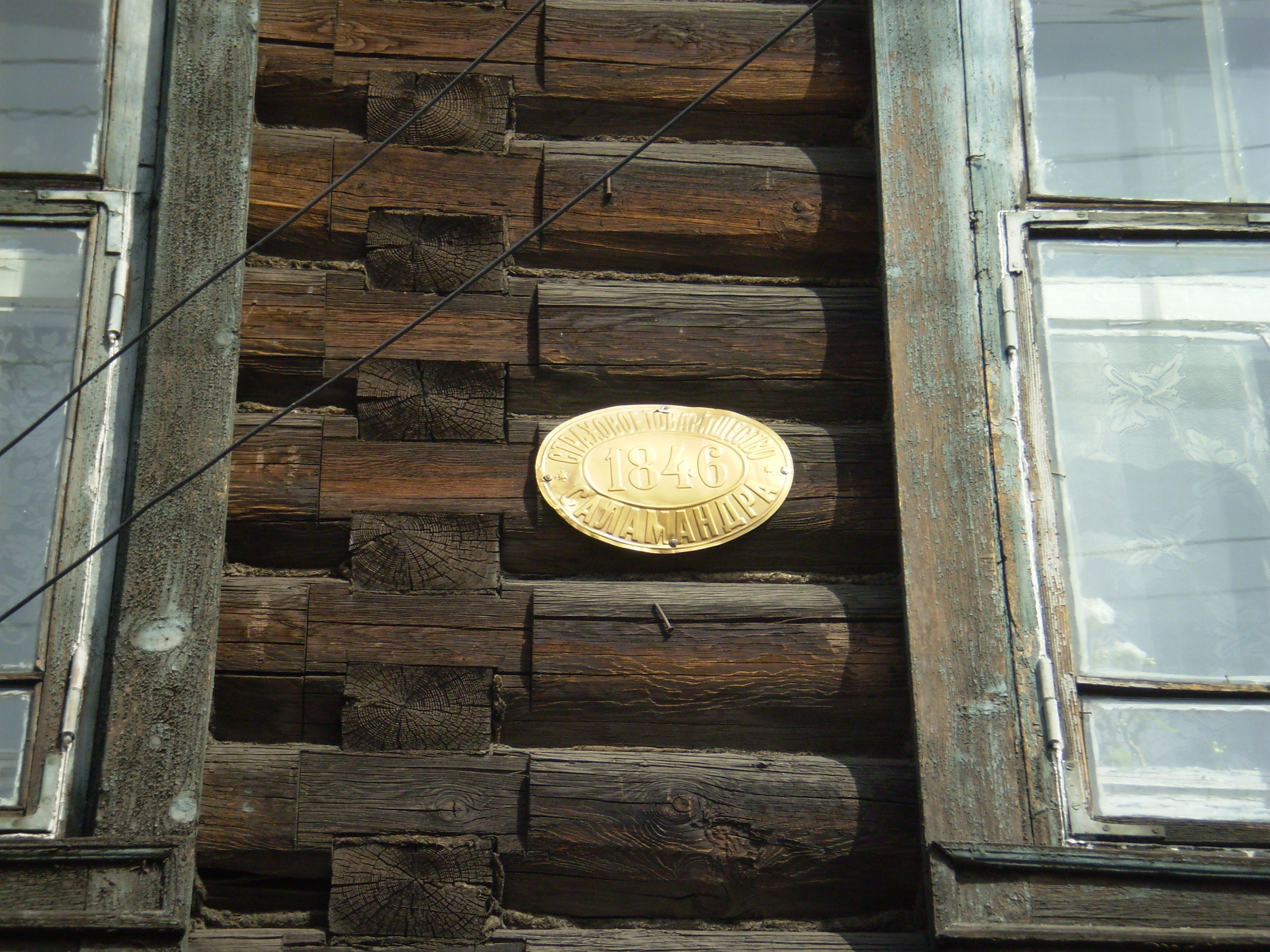
Stamped brass Russian specimen

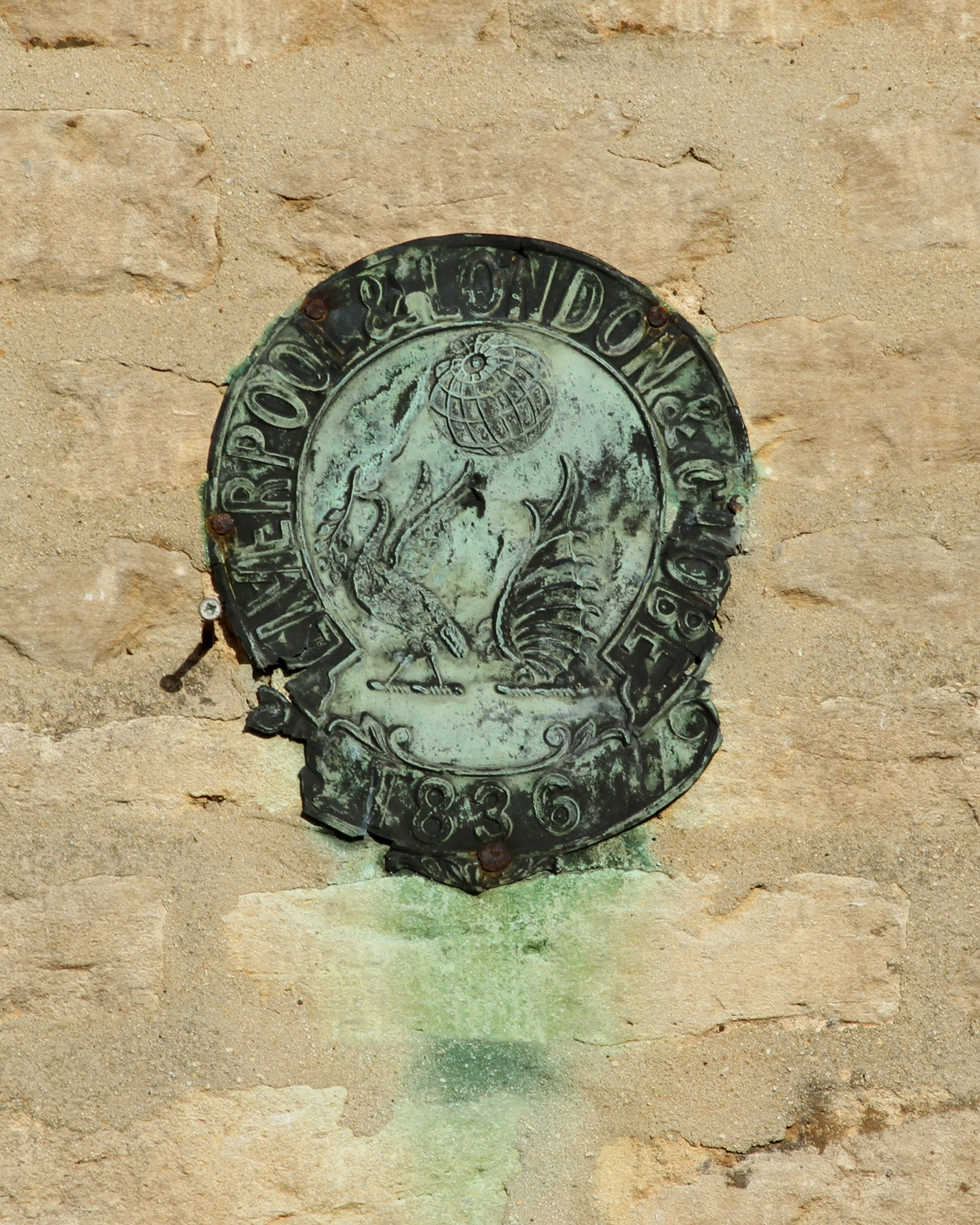
Cast brass British specimen. (In this case, 1836 is a year date rather than a serial number.)

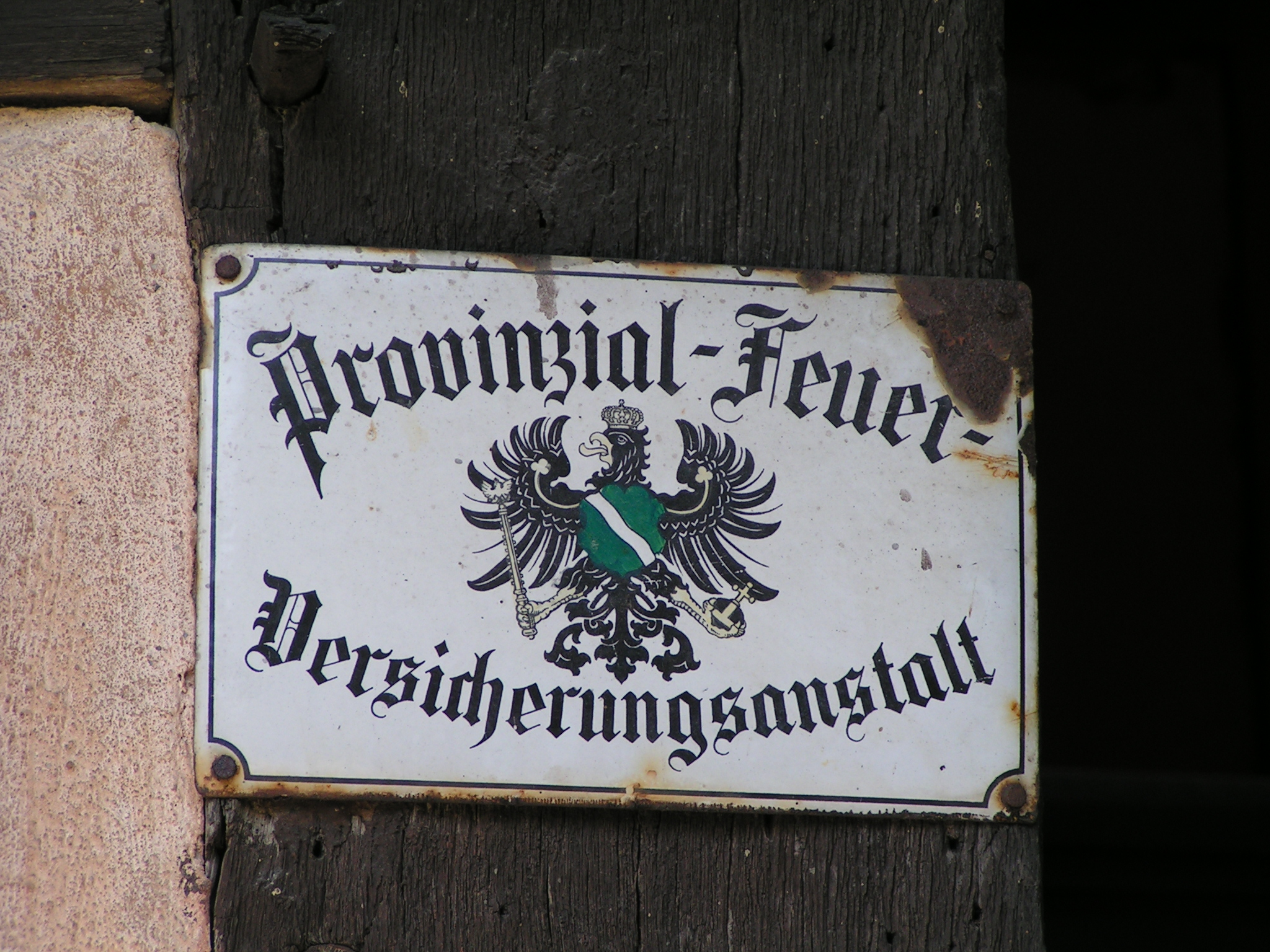
A German enamel sign type

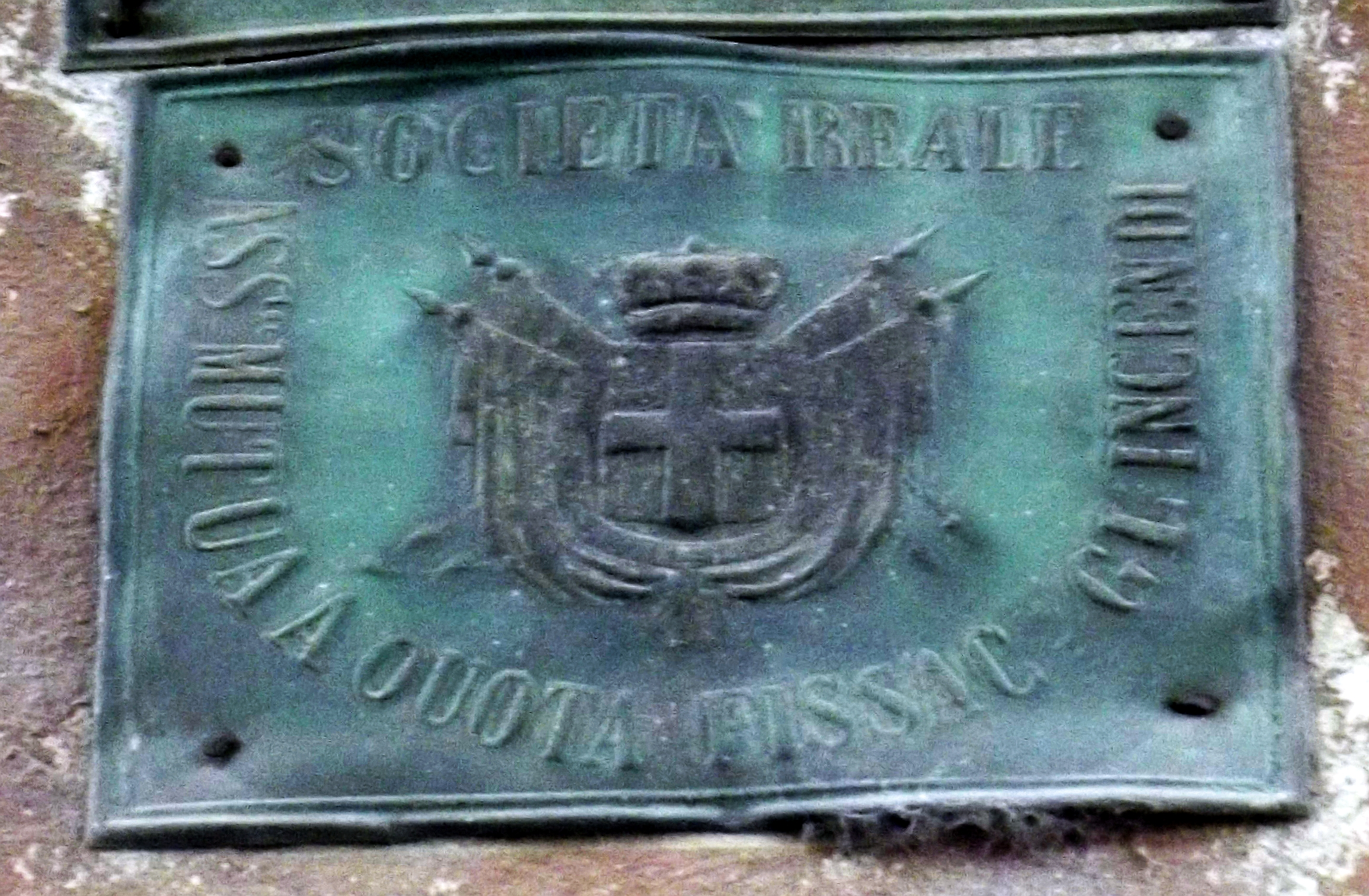
A stamped brass Italian fire plaque

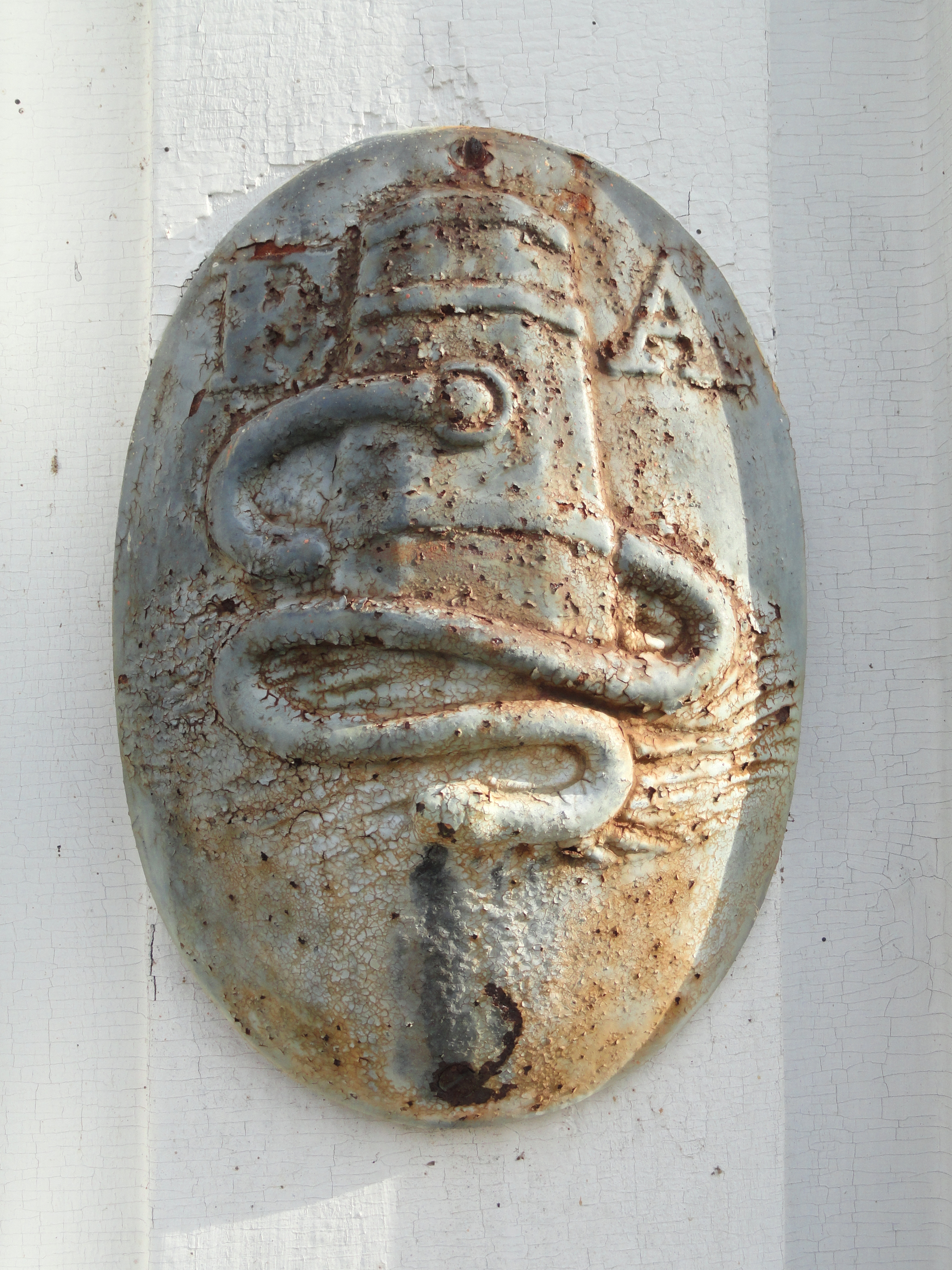
An American cast iron specimen

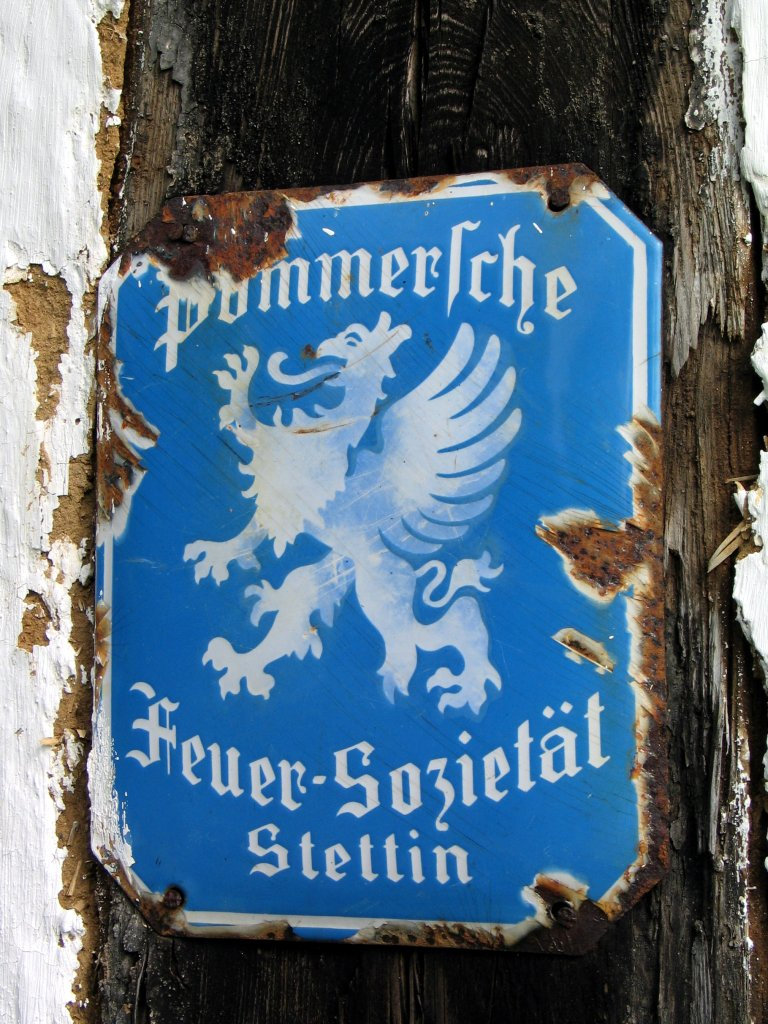
Polish enamel sign type written in German

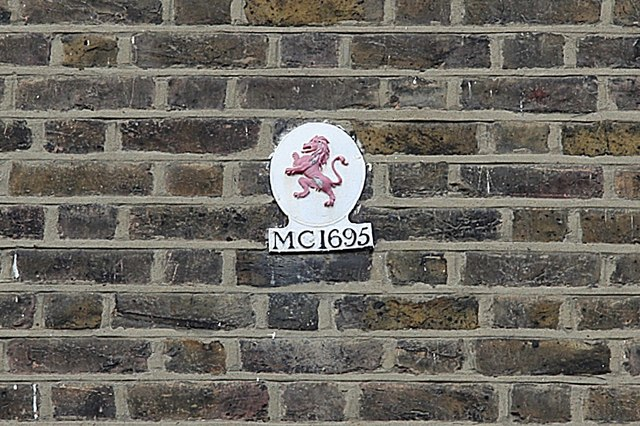
Painted metal British specimen

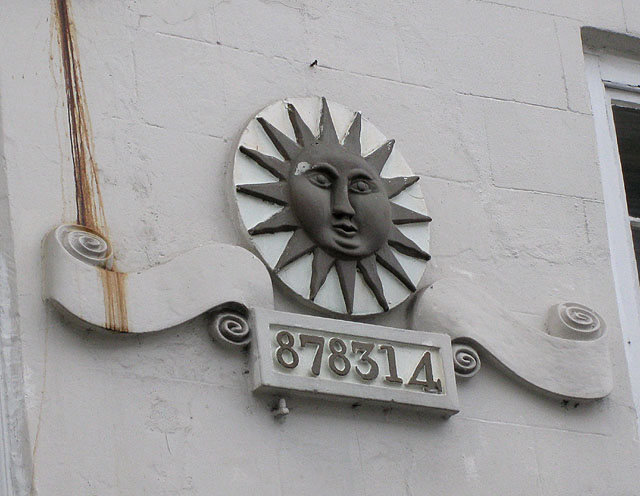
Unusual British specimen possibly made of painted terra cotta

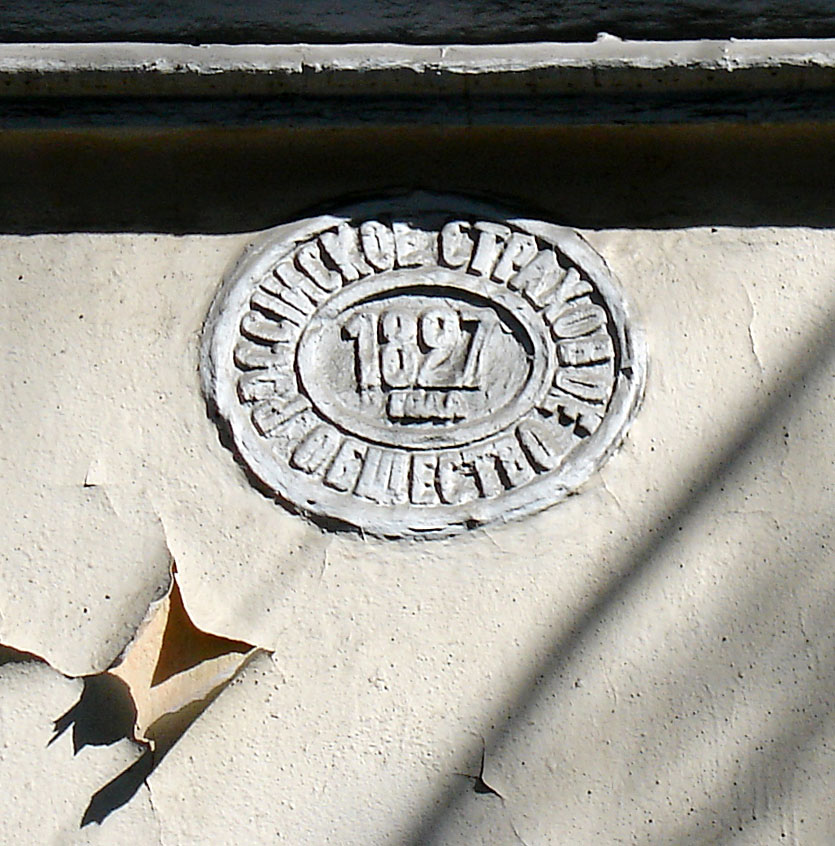
Unusual cement Russian specimen

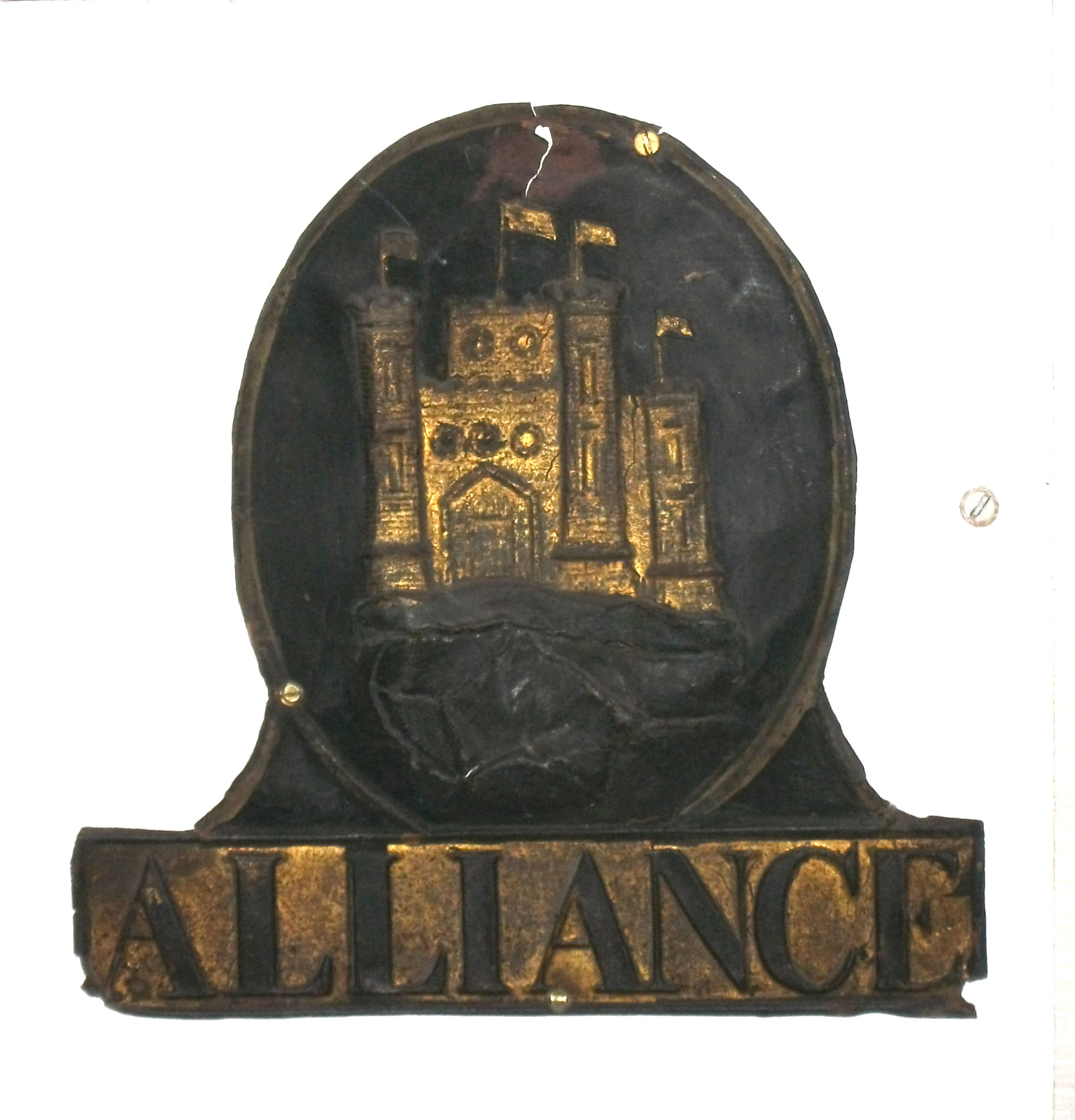
Embossed sheet brass British fire plaque with black painted details. (Flat sheet metal emblems may be called fire plaques.)

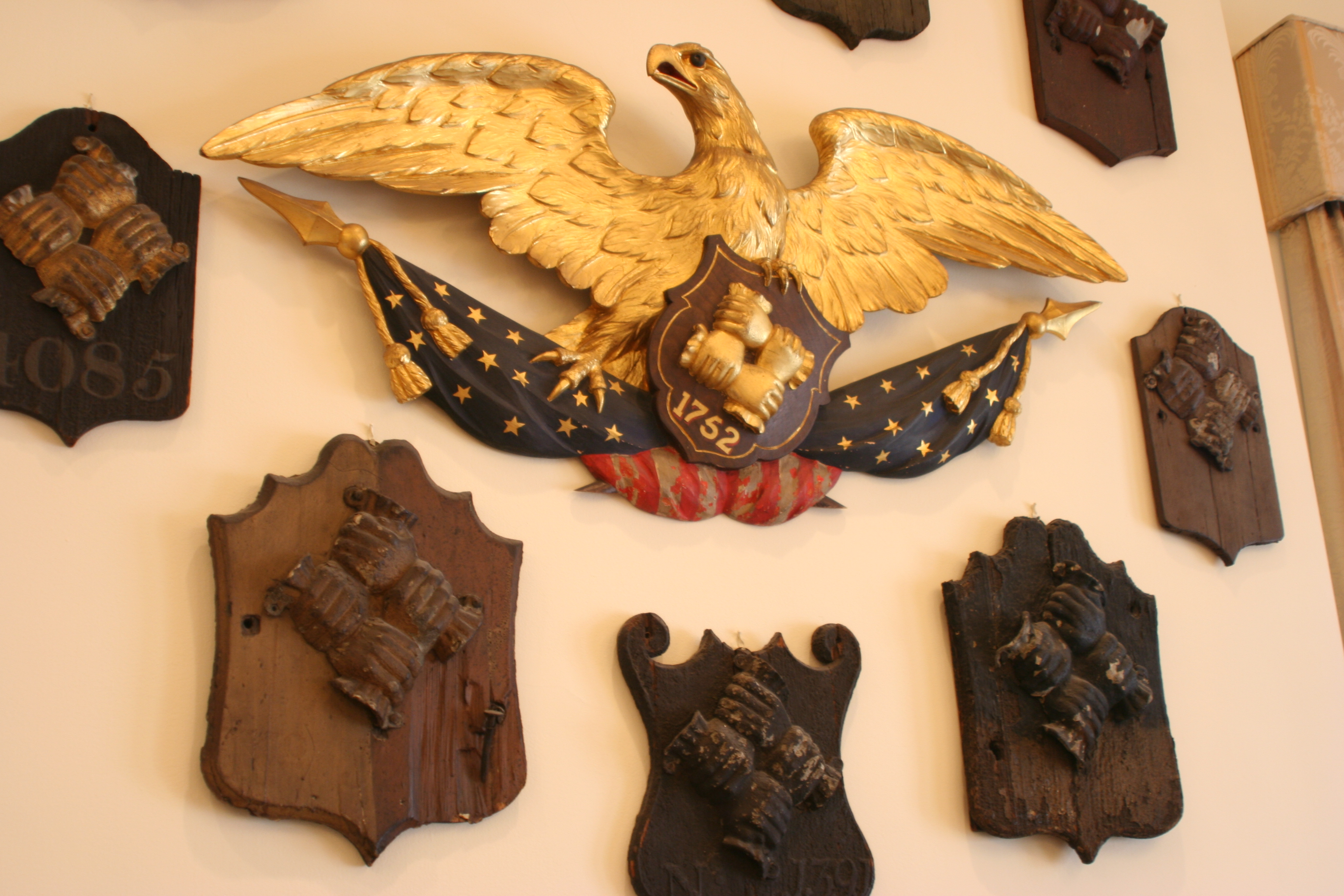
Interior decoration with a collection of Philadelphia Contributionship fire marks. Cast metal four-hand-carry emblems affixed to wooden shields which were numbered.

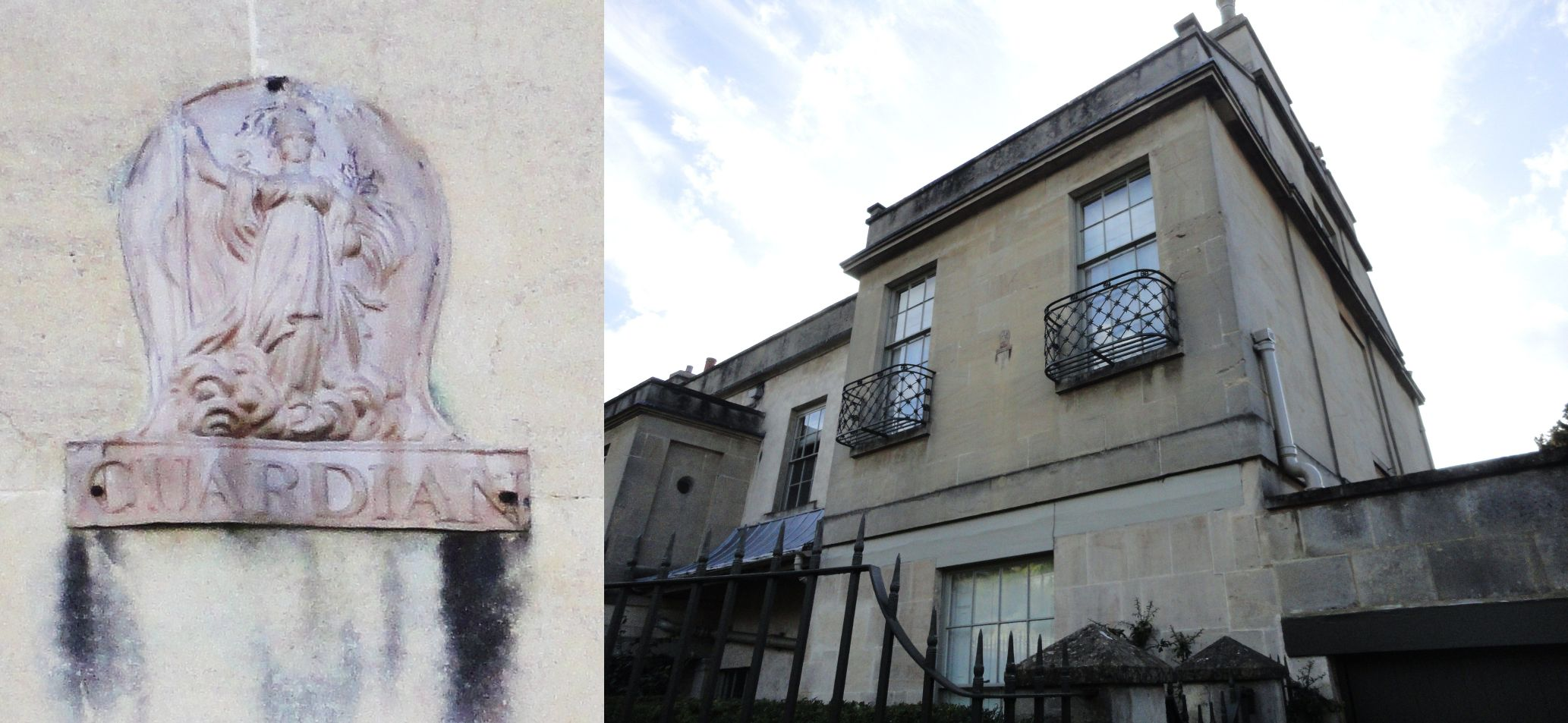
British lead mark shown close-up and in context as seen from the pavement (visible between the two windows)

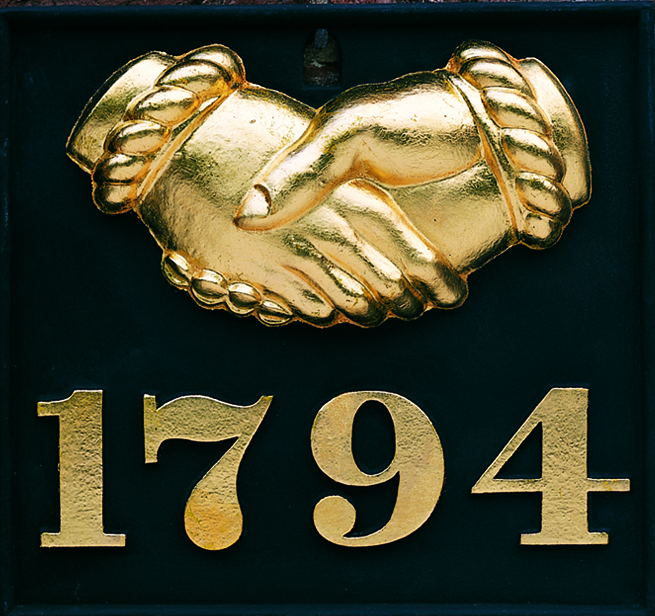
Gold leaf embellished Baltimore Equitable Society example. Unusually, the company still makes such fire marks and issues them to customers who want them.

== See also ==
- Property insurance
- Salvage Corps
