= Hand in Hand Fire and Life Insurance Society =

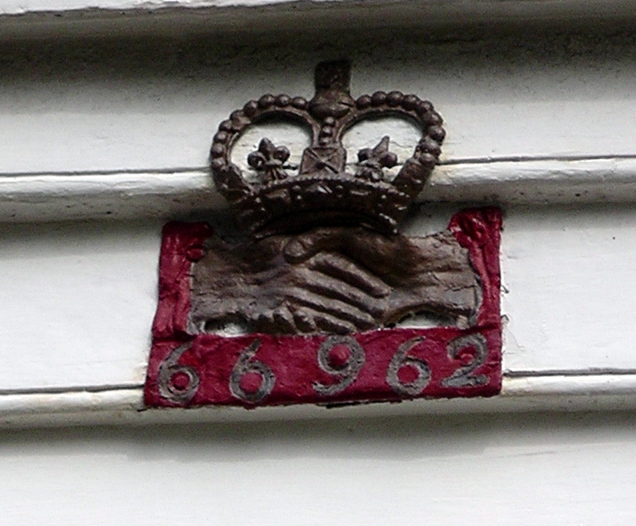
- Firemark of the Hand in Hand Fire and Life Insurance Society on a house in Dulwich
- Type: Mutual society
- Industry: Insurance
- Founded: 1696
- Defunct: 1905
- Fate: Acquired by Commercial Union
- Successor: Aviva plc
- Headquarters: London, UK

The Hand in Hand Fire and Life Insurance Society was one of the oldest British insurance companies.

== History ==
The company was founded in 1696 at Tom's Coffee House in St Martin's Lane in London. It was one of three fire insurance companies started after the Great Fire of London, and it was initially called the Contributors for Insuring Houses, Chambers or Rooms from Loss by Fire, by Amicable Contribution. In 1905, the Hand in Hand was acquired by the Commercial Union Group.
