= Thomas Bignold =

English businessman (1761–1835)

Thomas Bignold (1761–1835) was an English businessman. He was the founder of Norwich Union, now known as Aviva plc, one of the United Kingdom's largest insurance businesses.

== Career ==
Born in Westerham, Kent, Thomas Bignold worked as an exciseman before moving to Norwich in the early 1780s. He became a wine and spirit merchant in 1785. In 1792, he was appointed secretary of the Norwich General Assurance Company.

He left Norwich General Assurance in 1797 to found the Norwich Union Fire Insurance Society with support from local shopkeepers. He appointed 500 local agents who helped him to expand the geographic coverage of the business; growth was also driven by his practice of offering profit sharing to fire insurance policy holders. He went on to found the Norwich Union Life Insurance Society in 1808.

After 1815, the post-war recession started to bite and claims against the Society increased and he initially resisted many of those claims — some legitimately but others not. Eventually, his sons collaborated with the other directors to force him to retire.

In retirement, "Bignold's situation had deteriorated and his eccentricity may have crossed the border with insanity. He had been made bankrupt and incarcerated in a debtor’s prison. He had taken an interest in the shoe industry, patenting the invention of revolving heels for ladies' shoes."

He was a churchwarden and freeman grocer. He died in 1835.

== Family ==
By 1785 he had married Sarah Long and together they went on to have three sons and three daughters. His youngest son, Samuel, was his successor and later a Member of Parliament.
