= General Accident =

Scottish insurance company (1895–1998)

General Accident plc
- Type: Public
- Industry: Insurance
- Founded: 16 December 1885
- Defunct: 2 June 1998
- Fate: Merged with Commercial Union
- Successor: CGU plc
- Headquarters: Perth, Scotland

General Accident, properly General Accident Fire and Life Assurance Corporation plc, but commonly known by the shorter title, was a large insurance business based in Perth, Scotland. It merged with Commercial Union in 1998 to form CGU plc.

== History ==
=== The Norie-Miller years ===
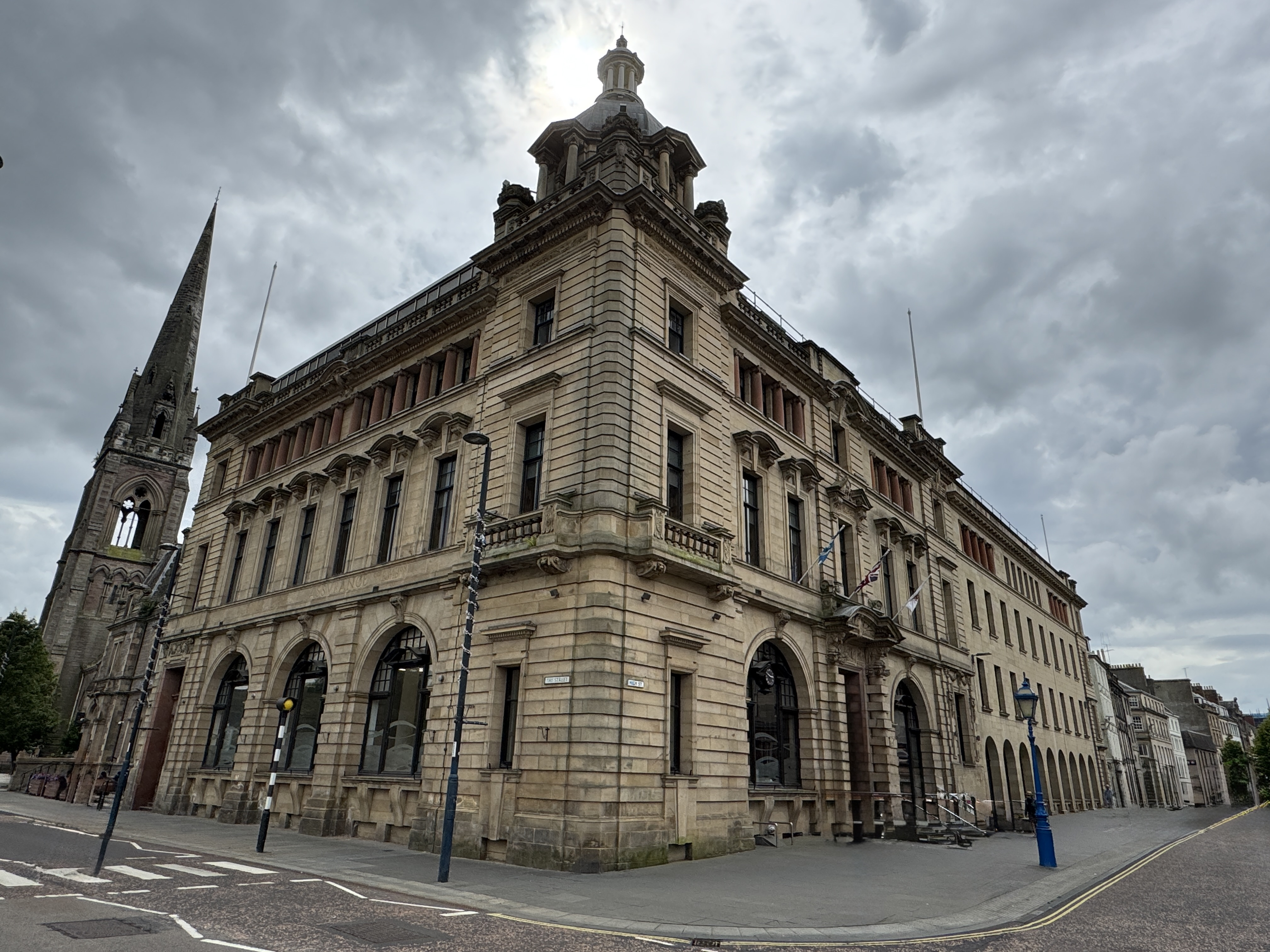
The 1899 headquarters at 2 High Street, designed by George Young

The Employers' Liability Act 1880 (43 & 44 Vict. c. 42) opened a new area of insurance and one of the many companies formed to serve that market was formed in Perth, Scotland, in 1885. The General Accident and Employers’ Liability Assurance Association was launched by local businessmen with a capital of only £5,000 and its main object was to provide local farmers and others with accident insurance. Its first policy was written in March 1886 and at its opening AGM it reported premium income of £2,700. Francis Norie-Miller was then appointed as secretary and manager at the age of 27: he had previously been the assistant manager of Mercantile Accident of Glasgow. His leadership spanned over half a century, remaining as managing director until 1939 and chairman until 1944; during that time, he took General Accident from a small local firm to a major international insurer.

By the time of the second AGM, branches had been opened in “all the important centres of the U.K.” and more than 800 agents appointed. Early financial results were encouraging but there were “heavy claims” in 1889. Fresh capital was raised and in 1891 the Association was reconstituted as The General Accident Assurance Corporation with an authorised capital of £100,000. As well as extending its geographic coverage, General Accident widened the range of policies. In 1890 it issued its first burglary policy, moved into the much larger fire insurance market in 1895 and, following the repeal of the Locomotives Act 1865 (28 & 29 Vict. c. 83) (the Red Flag Act) in 1896, started issuing motor policies. By the end of the 1890s, there were 20 branch offices and over 6,000 agencies. Overseas expansion began in the United States in 1899 and by 1914 there were offices on all continents. Marking its move into a full composite company, General Accident began issuing life assurance policies in 1906, changing its name to General Accident Fire and Life Assurance Corporation. By the onset of World War I premium income was £1.5 million.

Like many insurers, General Accident suffered losses in the early years of the war but became profitable in the latter years. Post-war growth was rapid, led by motor insurance and by 1924, premiums reached £5.4 million. A hire purchase subsidiary was formed in 1923 and in the same year the Road Transport and General Insurance Company was acquired. Other acquisitions included the General Life Assurance Company in 1925 and the Scottish Automobile and General Insurance Company in 1933, a Glasgow-based motor insurer.

General Life and Fire Assurance Company Act 1847
- Act of Parliament
- Parliament of the United Kingdom
- Long title: An Act to change the Name of the Protestant Dissenters and General Life and Fire Insurance Company to the General Life and Fire Assurance Company, and to extend to the Company, by its new Name, the Powers of the Act enabling the Company to sue and be sued in the Name of the Chairman, Deputy Chairman, or any One of the Directors or of the Secretary of the Company.
- Citation: 10 & 11 Vict. c. i

Dates
- Royal assent: 18 March 1847

Text of statute as originally enacted

The General Life Assurance Company had started as the Protestant Dissenters' and General Life and Fire Assurance Company in October 1837. It changed its name to the General Life and Fire Assurance Company by the General Life and Fire Assurance Company Act 1847 (10 & 11 Vict. c. i).

Between 1925 and 1935 the number of offices doubled and premium income exceeded £8 million. In 1933, Norie-Miller became chairman, while also remaining as managing director. His son Stanley became general manager, before serving as chairman from 1951 until 1968.

=== Post-war growth ===
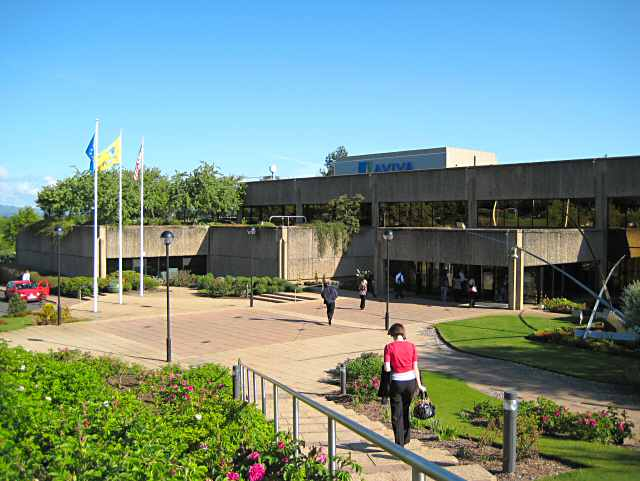
The new head office in Pithleavis opened in 1983. It was designed by James Parr & Partners.

Logo

In the post-war period General Accident acquired several new subsidiaries including the Yorkshire Insurance Company in 1967, despite a higher bid from Phoenix Assurance. By 1975 assets reached £1 billion and by the early 1980s assets were over £3 billion; total premium income was in excess of £1.5 billion, a third of which came from the US, By the late 1980s, General Accident had become increasingly acquisitive. In the UK this included a move into estate agency, soon to be loss-making.

By the end of the 1980s, GA had acquired over 500 estate agencies. In this way, General Accident enlarged its housing insurance business and created new channels for the distribution of other insurance products, especially lucrative life policies. The move into the estate agency business was not successful: the depressed British mortgage market produced considerable losses.

General Accident bought NZI Corporation, a New Zealand-based insurance and banking firm, in 1988, intending to use it to expand into the Pacific market; it too was soon loss-making.

In 1995 General Accident announced that it was purchasing Provident Mutual Life Assurance Association and this was completed in 1996.

In 1996 General Accident considered upsetting the proposed merger of Sun Alliance and Royal Insurance by making a hostile takeover bid for Sun Alliance. However, the board finally decided against doing so on the grounds that such an aggressive move was not General Accident's style; there was also concern over the extent to which such a bid from a Perth-based company would get support in the City of London. Later in 1996, General Accident bought the specialist motor insurer, Sabre Insurance.

In 1997 General Accident sought to make a major acquisition in the US but was outbid. This left it free to reconsider options in the UK.

=== Merger with Commercial Union ===
In 1997, General Accident made record profits of £511 million, putting it in a good bargaining position. In response to the trend for consolidation in the international insurance market, General Accident announced on 25 February 1998 a merger with Commercial Union. The merger was effected in June 1998 and the new merged company was named CGU plc.

=== Buildings ===
General Accident moved to a purpose-built head office at 2 High Street, Perth, in 1899; the building was extended in 1958. The company also used Viewlands House, to the west of the city centre, as a training college.

It moved to a new head office at Pitheavlis on Necessity Brae in 1983.

== Sources ==
Young, Peter (1999). A Premium Business: A History of General Accident. Granta Editions.
