= Enamel sign =

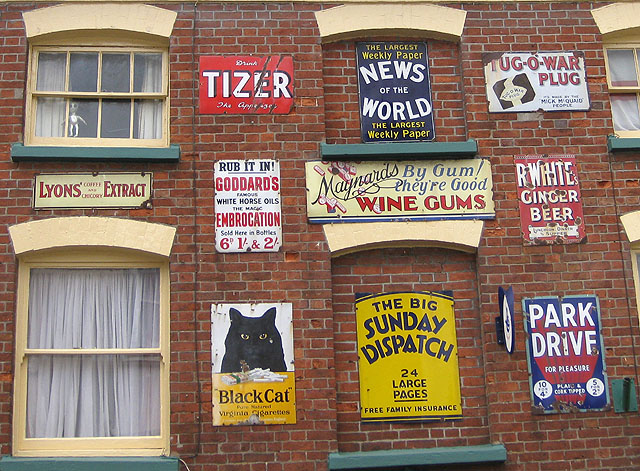
A selection of historic enamel signs advertising a variety of products, Herefordshire, Great Britain

An enamel sign is a sign made using vitreous enamel. These were commonly used for advertising and street signage in the period 1880 to 1950. Benjamin Baugh created the first purpose-built factory for making such signs in Selly Oak in 1889 — the Patent Enamel Company. The technique of porcelain enamelling on cast iron was developed in Central Europe in the early 1800s.

== History ==
The idea for enamel signs was first patented in 1859 by Benjamin Baugh in the United Kingdom with him creating one of the first dedicated factories for enamel signs created in 1889. It is thought to be the first, but the Chromatic Enamel Company started three years earlier in 1886. The use of enamel signs appeared in the United States around this time as well. The use of enamel signs died down around World War Two due to cost and use of metals needed for wartime efforts. Some specialty enamel sign construction companies exist today; however, they do not produce on a mass market scale.

== Technique ==
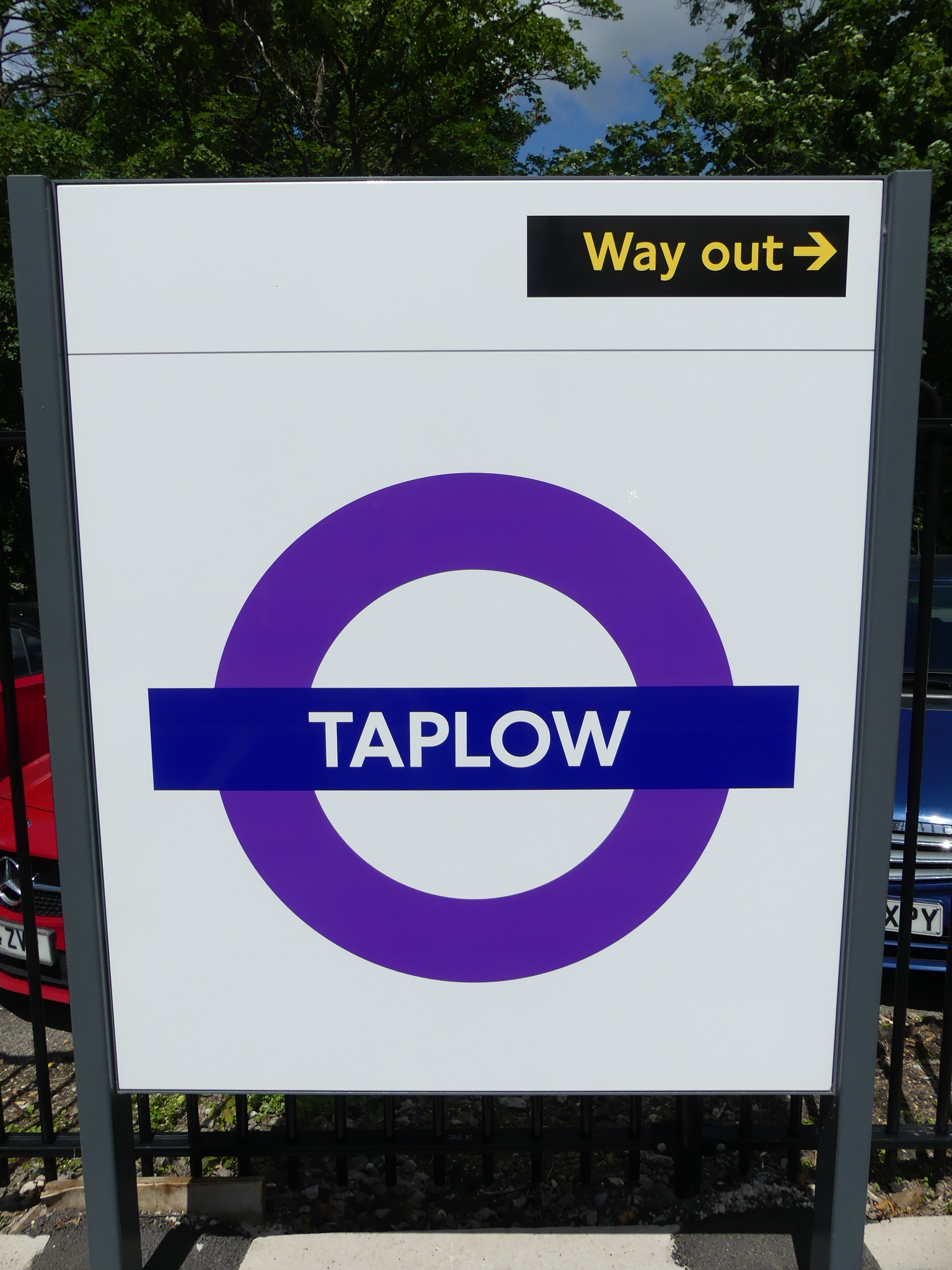
An enamel sign at Taplow railway station, Buckinghamshire, featuring the roundel for the Elizabeth line

Enamel signs are created by layering powdered glass over a base such as rolled iron. The design is first created through the use of markers or stencils. The sign is then heated and fused with the enamel per area and layer. Some later signs included the use of neon.

== Popularity among collectors ==
Enamel signs are popular among collectors due to their striking designs and sturdiness. Collecting enamel signs rose in popularity during the late 1970s. Some collectors are interested in signs about gasoline or about domestic products such as tobacco. A sign gets its value by a combination of size, design, condition, and product advertised. More recently more of the value is tied purely to the condition of the sign. Common damages to enamel signs include scratches, bullet holes, and crazings.

== See also ==
- Media related to Enamel signs at Wikimedia Commons
