= North British and Mercantile Insurance =

British insurance company

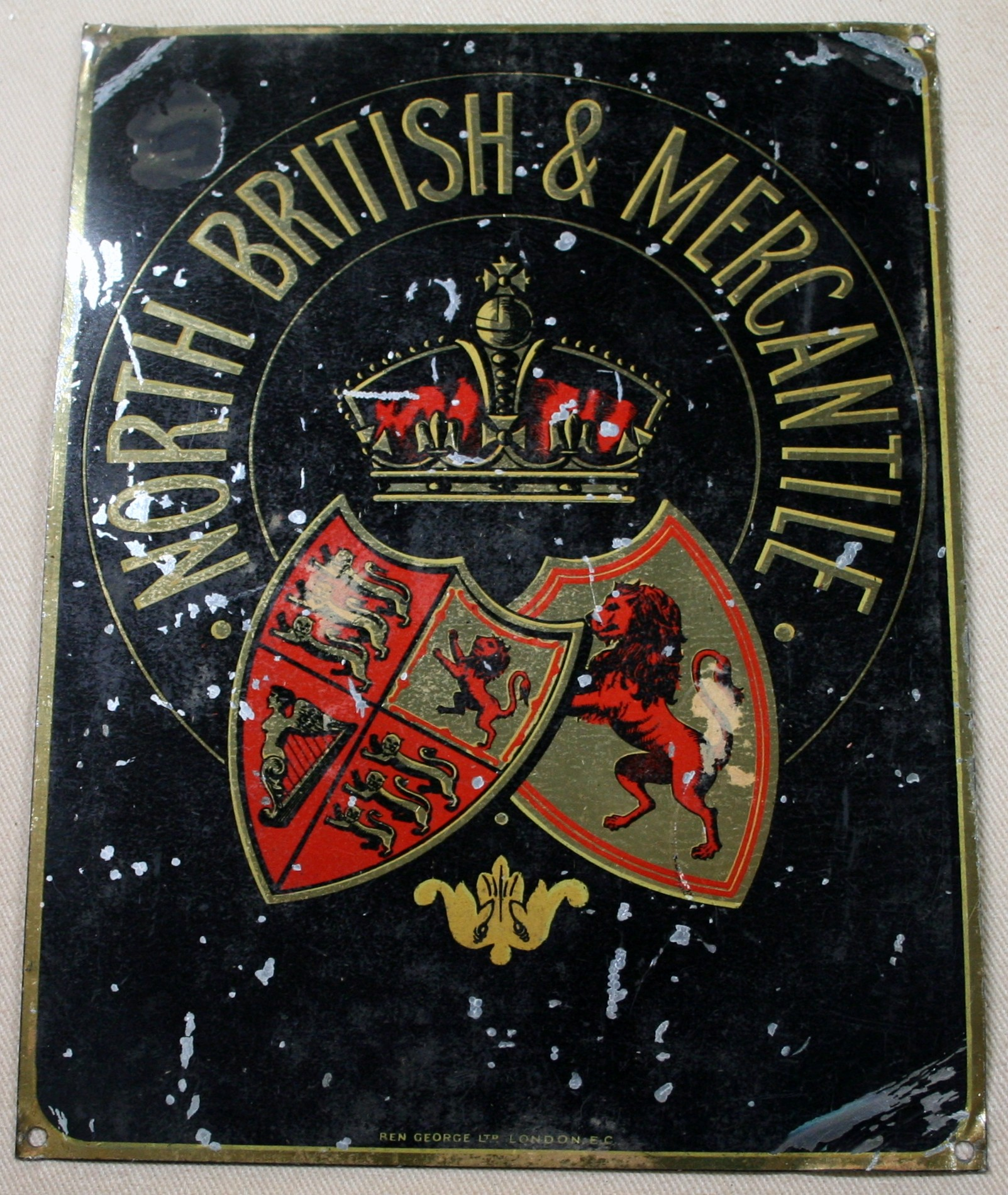
- Company fire mark

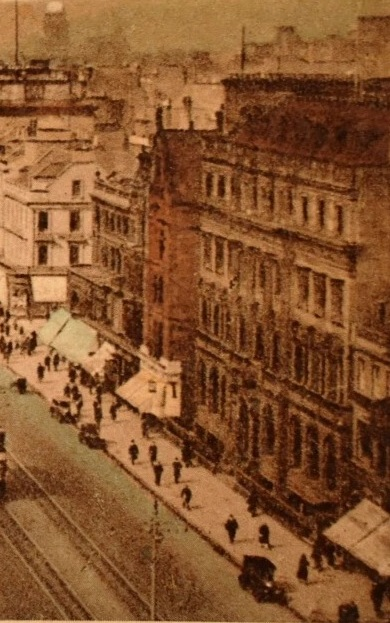
- Head office at 64 Princes Street Edinburgh, early 20th century, since demolished
- Industry: Insurance
- Founded: 1809
- Defunct: 1959
- Fate: Acquired by Commercial Union
- Key people: Lord Chetwynd (Governor)

North British and Mercantile Insurance Company was a British-based company founded in 1809 in Edinburgh and absorbed as a subsidiary of Commercial Union in 1959. The company was also known as the North British Insurance Company, North British Fire Office and North British Fire Insurance Company.

== History ==
The company was established after a meeting on 17 April 1809 at the Royal Exchange Coffee House, when a notice was placed in newspapers in Edinburgh announcing a proposal to found a fire insurance company called the North British Insurance Company. A contract of copartnery was issued on 19 October 1809 allowing a capital of £1 million and the new company commenced business on 11 November. In 1823 the company extended its business to include life insurance. The company, successfully trading and growing, was granted a royal charter on 6 February 1824, in the expectation that the permitted capital would be exceeded.

In 1862 the company merged with Mercantile Fire Insurance Company and changed its name to North British & Mercantile Insurance Company. From 1890 until 1996, the company had an arrangement with the Civil Service Insurance Society allowing society members to be insured by North British & Mercantile on special rates. In the 1860s, the company had opened businesses and agencies across the world, including the far east and Africa.

North British & Mercantile extended its business to include all marine risks in 1901. Later, through its subsidiaries, general insurance was added. The company's scope continued to grow and, by 1911, it was transacting fire, life, marine, accident, fine art, burglary and motor insurance. In May 1911, the company's burglary and contingency department was transferred to a subsidiary, the Railway Passengers Assurance Company.

A new head office building, at No. 64 Princes Street in Edinburgh, was designed by John More Dick Peddie and George Washington Browne in the Palazzo style, built in ashlar stone and was completed in 1903.

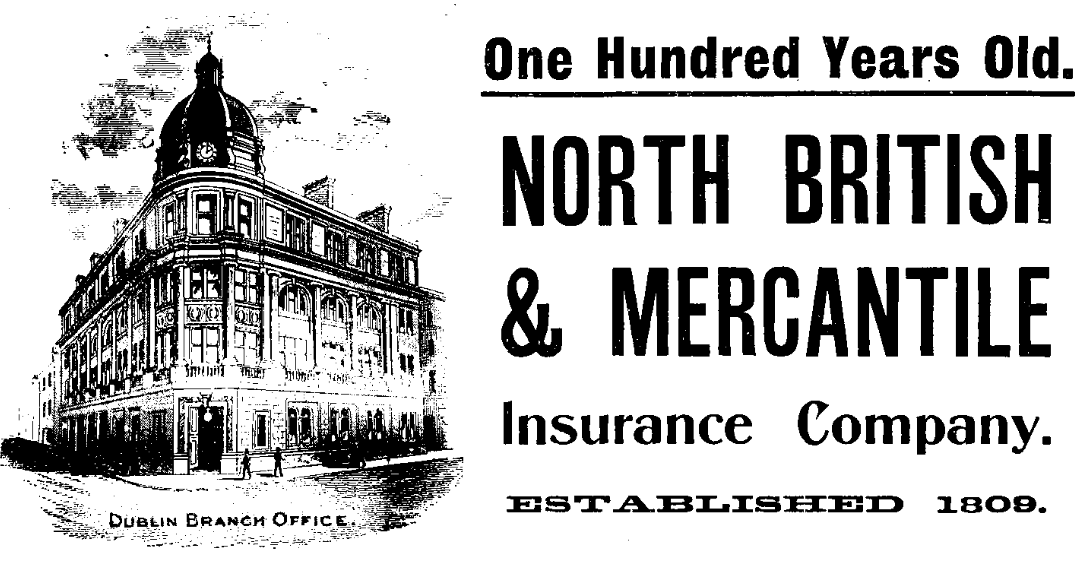
Morrison Chambers, Dublin – a North British & Mercantile office from an advertisement of 1910.

It was incorporated as a limited company on 1 November 1920 and became a subsidiary of Commercial Union in 1959. The company maintained head offices at Princes Street in Edinburgh until 1963, and at Threadneedle Street in London until 1969 with Dublin offices at College Green and later at the purpose built Morrison Chambers on Dawson Street.

Since 30 June 2006 it has been registered as a non-trading company.

== Bibliography ==
- North British and Mercantile Insurance Company – Centenary 1809 – 1909. Edinburgh: Banks & Co. 1909.
