= Norwich Union =

English insurance company (1797–2000)

- Industry: Insurance
- Founded: 1797
- Founder: Thomas Bignold
- Defunct: 30 May 2000
- Fate: Merged with CGU plc
- Successor: Aviva
- Headquarters: Surrey House, Norwich
- Website: heritage.aviva.com

Norwich Union was a British insurance company. It was originally established in 1797. In 2000, it merged with CGU, to form CGNU, which became Aviva. It was listed on the London Stock Exchange and was once a constituent of the FTSE 100 Index.

On 29 April 2008, Aviva announced that the Norwich Union brand would be phased out and disappear over a period of two years, on the grounds that a consistent Aviva brand would bring "global impact." On 1 June 2009, Norwich Union was rebranded as Aviva.

== History ==
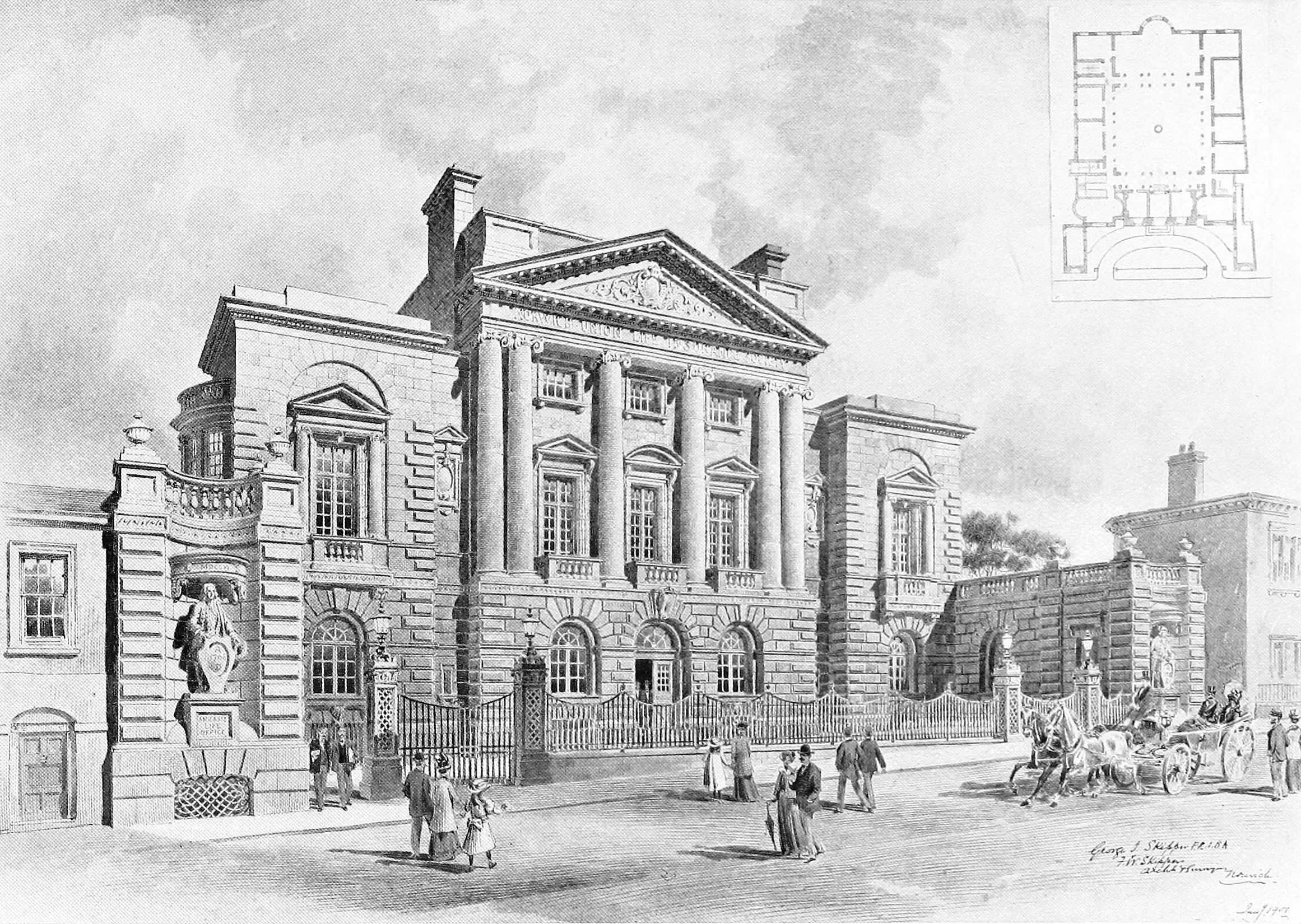
The 1904 headquarters in Norwich, designed by George Skipper

Norwich Union was founded in 1797 in Norwich, when 36-year-old merchant and banker Thomas Bignold formed the "Norwich Union Society for the Insurance of Houses, Stock and Merchandise from Fire", a mutual society owned by the policyholders who received a share of the profits. This in turn became known as the Norwich Union Fire Insurance Office.

In 1808 Thomas Bignold established a second mutual, the Norwich Union Life Insurance Society. The Fire Society demutualised in 1821 when it absorbed the Norwich General Assurance Company. In common with many insurance companies against fire loss, they operated their own fire brigades to protect (only) the society's policyholders whose buildings were identified by "fire insurance marks". It was not until 1929 that the Fire Society gave up its last private brigade, in Worcester, to the municipal authorities.

In 1997, its bicentenary year, Norwich Union demutualised and floated as a public limited company on the London Stock Exchange. Although it sold general insurance, motoring, healthcare and life policies—its wide range of products leading indirectly to its slogan no-one protects more—it was listed on the markets as a life company, and in later years was under some pressure from analysts to shed its general insurance arm.

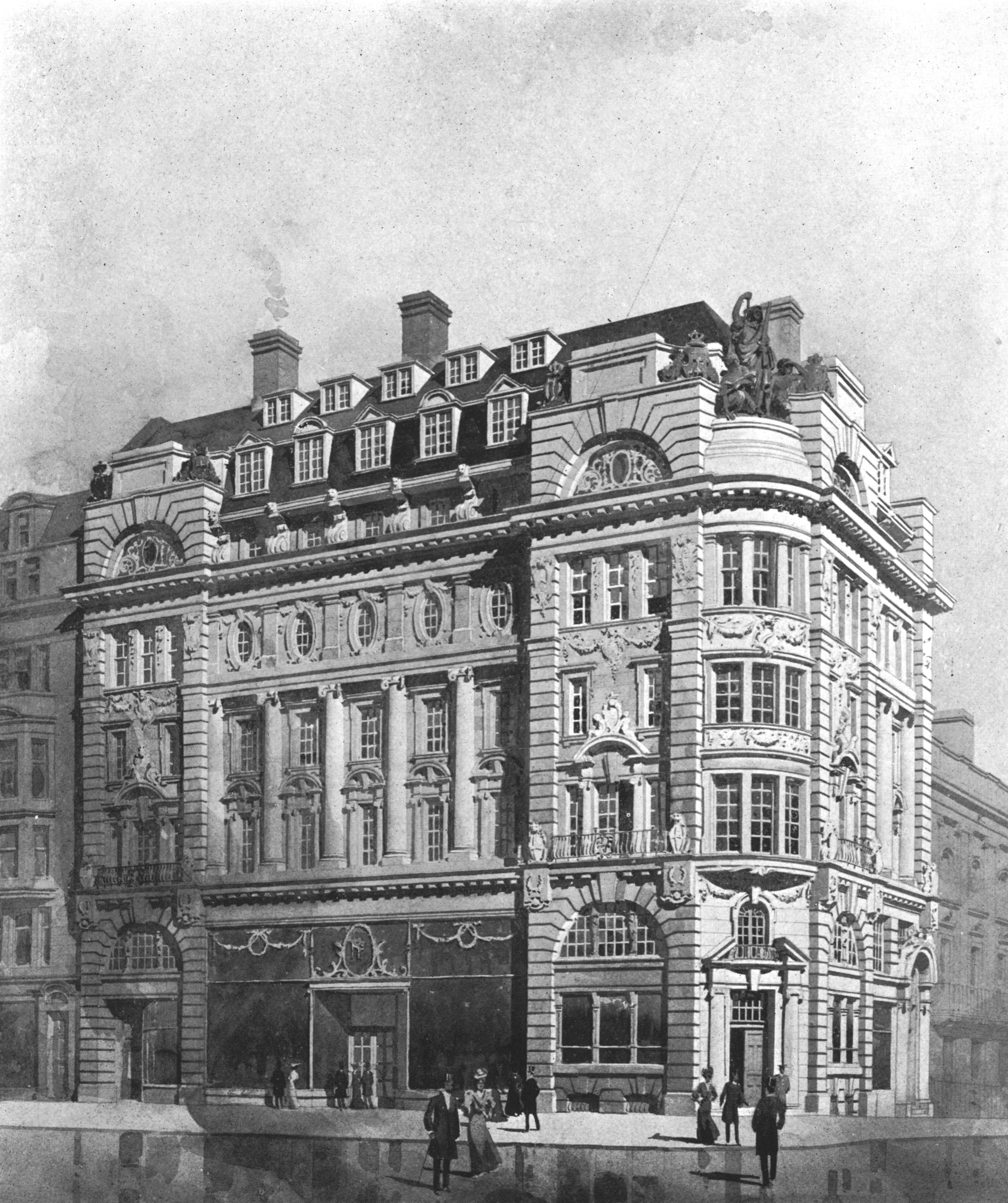
The 1904 office at 162 Piccadilly, designed by Ernest Runtz and Ford

In 2000, Norwich Union merged with CGU, which itself was formed from the merger of General Accident and Commercial Union in October 1998. The Norwich Union had tried to take over General Accident over 100 years earlier. CGU also offered a broad range of life and general insurance products, with a stronger global presence than the heavily UK-based Norwich Union. Upon merging they formed the group CGNU which went on to become the Aviva group. In 2005, there were still two companies operating in the UK under the Aviva umbrella that used the Norwich Union brand: Norwich Union Insurance (NUGI) and Norwich Union Life (NUL).

Following an extensive pilot, in October 2006, Norwich Union introduced a novel type of auto insurance called Pay as You Drive (PAYD). A GPS receiver and mobile technology are placed in a car and risk factors (time of day, distance, mileage) are monitored. The information is transmitted back to the insurance company. Drivers using their vehicles at low-risk times of day or on low-risk roads or driving low mileage get a discount on their motor insurance premiums. There are several business method patents covering this invention. The Pay as You Drive service was withdrawn in 2008 due to lower-than-expected volumes of new business.

Norwich Union supported a European public service ad campaign against careless driving at too great a speed. The ad campaign was known as "The Faster the Speed, the Bigger the Mess".

== Customer service ==
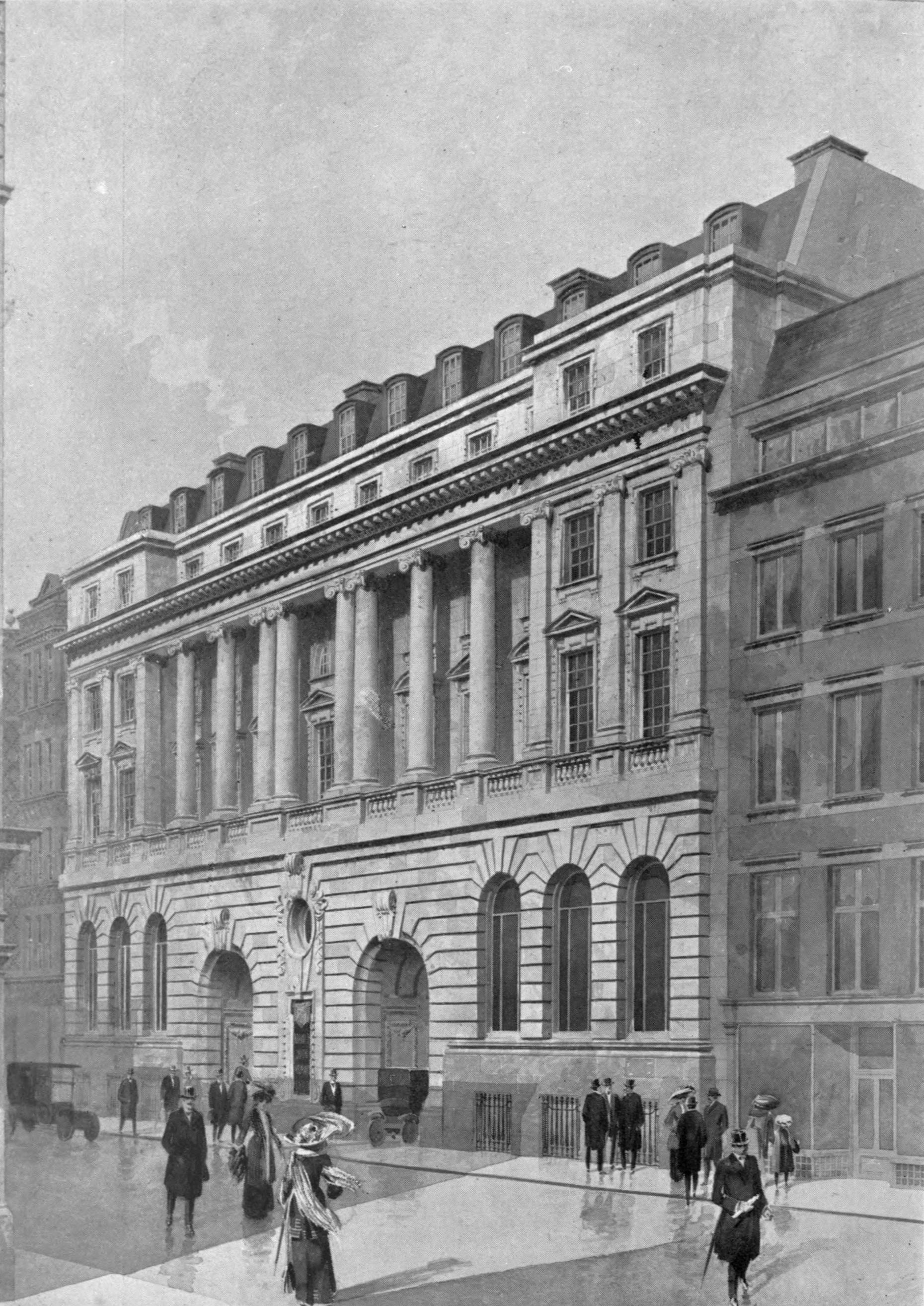
The 1911 London offices at 49-50 Fleet Street, designed by Howell & Brooks

In December 2007, Norwich Union was fined £1.26m by the Financial Services Authority (FSA), after customers with life assurance policies were put at risk of fraud. The FSA said the company had failed to deal with the issue properly, even when it had been alerted to the problem.

After discovering an overcharging error that dated back to 2001, Norwich Union agreed to compensate their clients with a cheque for £300 each, due to charges that exceeded the 1% cap imposed by the government. The final amount of compensation was expected to exceed £11 million.

== International operations ==
In Canada, Norwich Union was well known as a direct marketer of life insurance products, often promoted through frequently repeated television advertisements. Most famous was a spot beginning with the phrase, "It's Patrick! He took out life insurance." Following the Norwich/CGU merger, this unit was sold to American International Group and renamed AIG Assurance, which decided to drop the "Patrick" ads. The unit was then resold in 2009 to Bank of Montreal, and is now known as BMO Insurance.

In Australia the operations of Norwich Union Australia were rebranded as Aviva in October 2003. The company then consisted of three businesses: life insurance, fund manager Portfolio Partners (which reports directly to London) and the master trust/financial planning service Navigator.
