= CGU plc =

British insurance company (1998–2000)

- Type: Public
- Industry: Insurance
- Predecessor: Commercial Union; General Accident
- Founded: 2 June 1998
- Defunct: 30 May 2000
- Fate: Merged with Norwich Union
- Successor: Aviva
- Headquarters: No 1 Poultry, City of London

CGU plc was a large insurance group, created by the merger of Commercial Union and General Accident in 1998. The company was listed on the London Stock Exchange. It merged with Norwich Union in 2000 to form CGNU plc, later renamed Aviva plc.

== History ==
The company was created by the 1998 merger of Commercial Union and General Accident. It was based at 1 Poultry in London.

It only existed for two years before it merged with Norwich Union in 2000 to form CGNU plc, later renamed Aviva plc.

In the US, the CGU casualty and property businesses were purchased by White Mountains Insurance Group; the name of the company was later changed to OneBeacon Insurance Company.
