= Pearl Assurance War Memorial =

War memorial in Peterborough, England

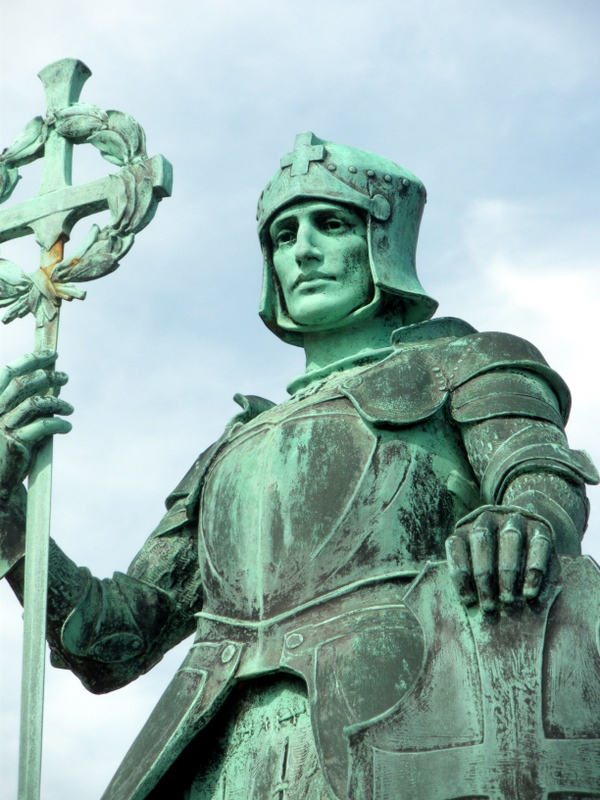

The Pearl Assurance War Memorial, also known as the Pearl Centre War Memorial, is a First World War memorial, designed by George Frampton for the Pearl Assurance Company. Erected in London in 1921, it was moved to Peterborough in 1991. It became a Grade II* listed building in 2019.

The memorial features a 2.1 m (6 ft 11 in) high bronze statue by George Frampton depicting Saint George in medieval armour, standing on a slain dragon. Saint George is raising the hilt of his sword in his left hand to form a cross, encircled by a wreath, and resting his left hand on a shield which bears Saint George's Cross. The cast bears the name and date "GEO. FRAMPTON RA / 1919".

Frampton used a similar design, St George on top of a stone plinth, for Maidstone War Memorial. Edwin Lutyens had similar statues of St George by Frampton mounted on taller plinths for Hove War Memorial and Fordham War Memorial. The statue is based on a statuette that Frampton exhibited at the Royal Academy in 1899, and a small statuette held in the left hand of his monumental statue of Queen Victoria outside the Victoria Memorial, Kolkata.

The statue stands on a square granite plinth, mounted on three granite steps. Each side of the plinth bears a bronze plaque which together list the names of the 445 staff of the Pearl Assurance Company that were killed in the First World War, and an inscription "THEY PASSED AWAY IN THE DAYS / OF THEIR STRENGTH, THEY / LIVE FOREVER IN THE UNDYING / FACT OF THEIR SACRIFICE". Just above each plaque is a small rectangular decorative bronze plaque: two in low relief showing warships (west) or aircraft (east), and two in high relief (north and south) showing with a helmet surrounded by a wreath.

The memorial was erected in the central courtyard at the head office of the Pearl Assurance Company, at 247 to 252 High Holborn in London (now the Rosewood London hotel), which is itself a Grade II listed building. It was unveiled by the company's chairman F. D. Bowles (grandfather of Frank Bowles, Baron Bowles) and dedicated by the Bishop of Truro (Guy Warman) in 1921.

Pearl Assurance closed their Holborn offices in 1989 and moved to a newly constructed building at the Pearl Centre (now Lynch Wood) on Peterborough Business Park, at Orton Waterville to the south west of Peterborough. The memorial was moved and installed in the landscaped gardens to the east of the Pearl Centre, beside its entrance road. It was rededicated by the Bishop of Truro (Michael Ball) in 1991. Displayed nearby are four separate bronze plaques listing 217 names of dead from the Second World War.

The memorial became listed at Grade II* in 2019. The postmodern Pearl Centre designed by Chapman Taylor and the gardens designed by Professor Arnold Weddle are each also listed at Grade II.

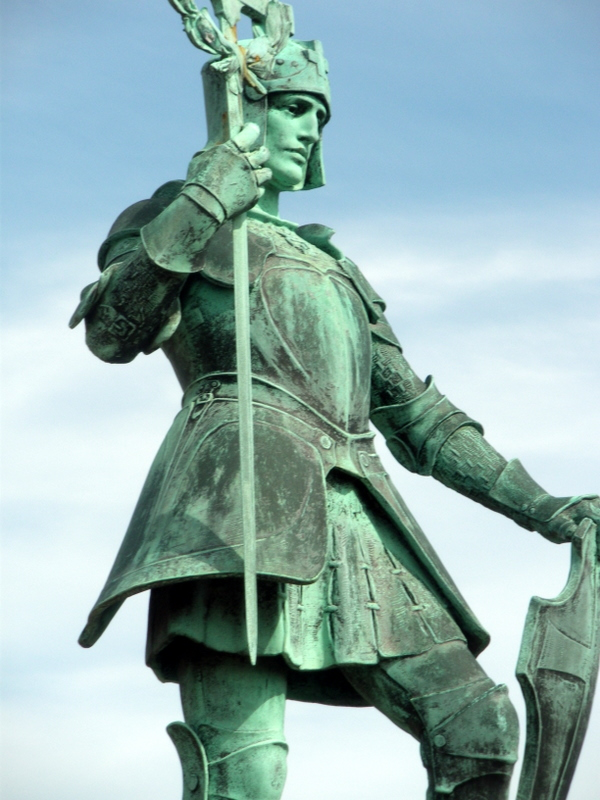

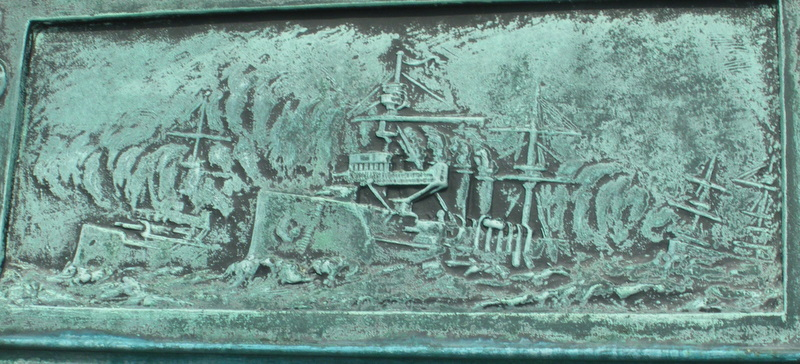

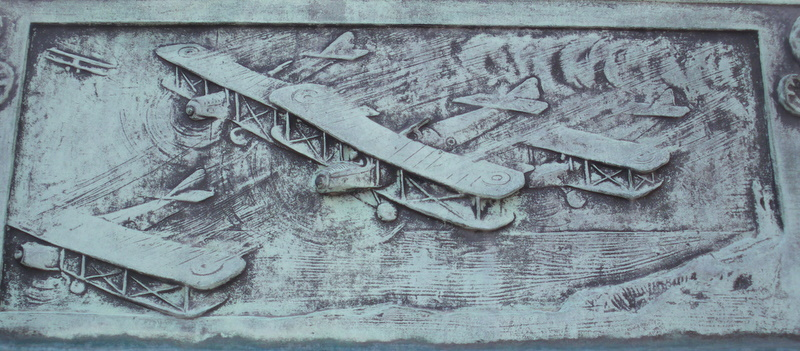
