= Aviva =

British insurance company

Aviva plc
- Formerly: CGNU plc (2000–2002)
- Type: Public
- Traded as: LSE: AV. FTSE 100 Component
- Industry: Insurance
- Predecessor: CGU plc Norwich Union
- Founded: 30 May 2000
- Headquarters: London, England, UK
- Area served: United Kingdom; Ireland; Canada; China; India
- Key people: George Culmer (chairman); Amanda Blanc (CEO)
- Services: Life insurance; Pensions; General Insurance
- Revenue: ▲£25.437 billion (2025)
- Operating income: ▲£1.843 billion (2025)
- Net income: ▲£1.054 billion (2025)
- Total assets: ▲£395.304 billion (2025)
- Total equity: ▲£11.089 billion (2025)
- Number of employees: 36,000 (2026)
- Subsidiaries: Aviva Canada; Aviva Direct; Aviva Health; Aviva Investors; Direct Line Group
- Website: aviva.com

Aviva plc is a British multinational insurance company headquartered in London, England. It has about 25.3 million customers in the United Kingdom, Ireland and Canada. It is the UK's only diversified insurer, and also the second-largest general insurer in Canada.

Aviva has a primary listing on the London Stock Exchange, and is a constituent of the FTSE 100 Index.

== Name ==
The name of the company upon its formation in May 2000 was CGNU plc and was created when Norwich Union merged with insurer CGU plc. In April 2002, the company's shareholders voted to change the company name to Aviva plc, an invented palindrome word derived from "viva", the Latin for 'alive' and designed to be short, memorable and work worldwide. The new company's logo incorporated a triangle, which is based on the spire of Norwich Cathedral. The Norwich Union brand was retained for the UK long-term savings and general insurance business.

In April 2008, Aviva announced that it would adopt the Aviva name as its worldwide consumer-facing brand, and that the Norwich Union brand would be phased out in the United Kingdom.

== History ==
Aviva can trace its history back to the establishment of the Hand in Hand Fire & Life Insurance Society in London in 1696.

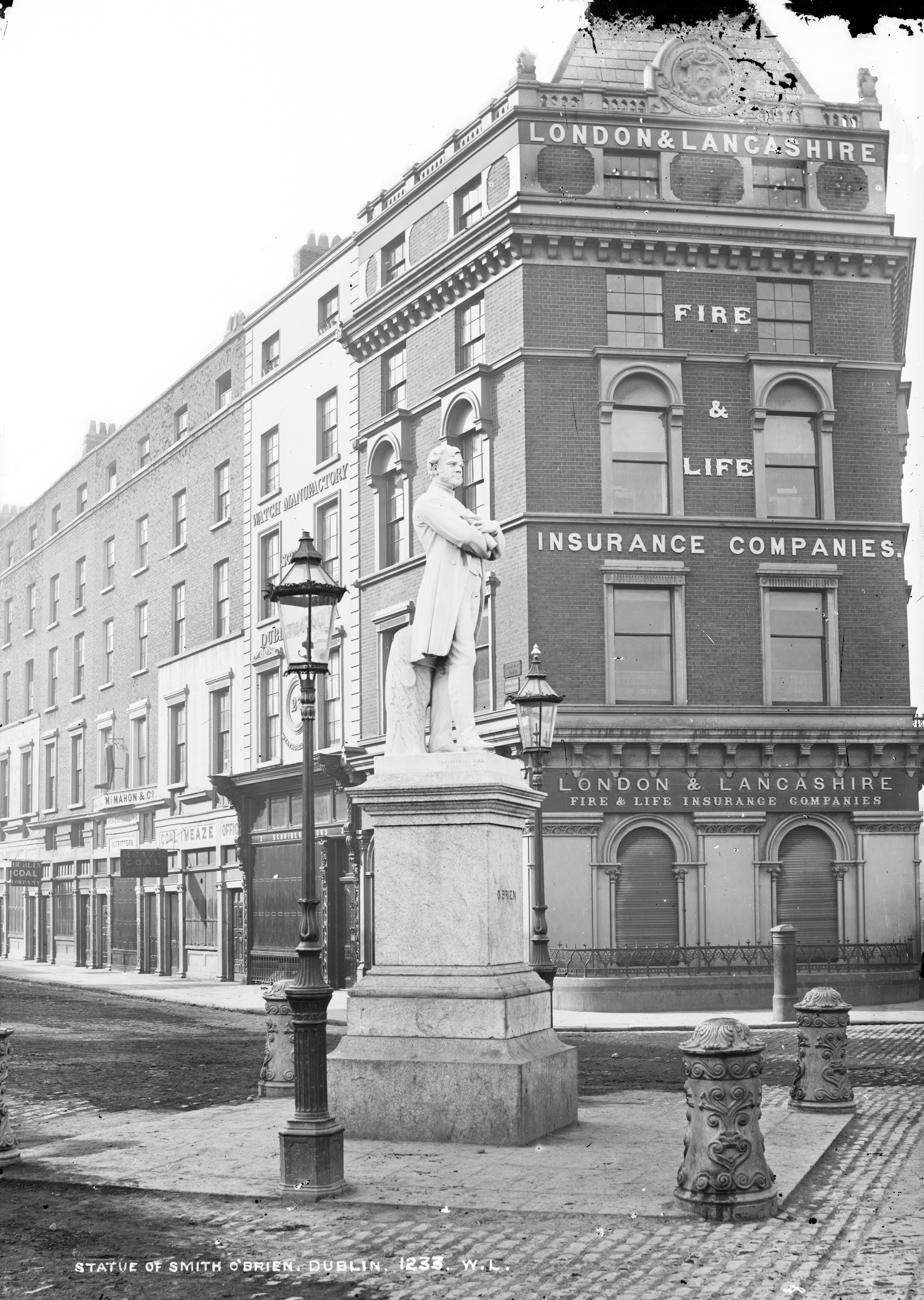
Predecessor company London and Lancashire Fire and Life, pictured in Dublin, c. 1871

It was created by a merger of two British insurance firms, Norwich Union and CGU plc (itself created by the merger of 1998 of Commercial Union and General Accident) as CGNU in February 2000. The Aviva name was adopted in July 2002. Thereafter, most of the group operations, except for some strong local brands, were carried out under the uniform brand "Aviva".

In 2002, Aviva purchased Abeille Vie, a French life insurance company.

In March 2005, Aviva acquired the RAC plc breakdown recovery operation for around £1.1 billion.

In July 2006, Aviva greatly increased its presence in the United States by acquiring AmerUs Group, a Des Moines based financial services company, founded as the Brotherhood of American Yeomen in 1896, in a $2.9 billion (£1.6 billion) deal.

The launch was supported by a £9 million advertising campaign to promote the rebranding (one of the most expensive ever in the insurance field), with the participation of celebrities including Bruce Willis and Alice Cooper. In June 2009, the company decided to dispose of Navigator, its Australian wealth management business, to National Australia Bank for A$825 million (£401 million).

In October 2009, the company decided to focus on its commercial insurance sector and demonstrate its commitment to brokers by launching their 'find a broker' facility, using the British Insurance Brokers Association search engine. To help them with this endeavour, Paul Whitehouse was recruited to play the part of a successful hairdresser running three salons. The message of the campaign focused on business insurance through insurance brokers.

In September 2011, Aviva completed the sale of RAC plc breakdown recovery operation for £1.0 billion to The Carlyle Group. In February 2012, Aviva sold its occupational health business to the British support services company Capita.

In July 2012, Aviva announced plans to sell or close 16 non core businesses in order to simplify its activities and boost shareholder returns. As part of the plans Aviva announced the sale of its operations in South Korea and the closure to new business of its bulk buying annuity unit in the United Kingdom. In August 2012, Aviva announced that up to 800 jobs would be lost, following a reorganization caused by further turmoil in the Eurozone.

In December 2012, Aviva agreed to sell Aviva USA Corporation to Athene Holding for US$1.8 billion (£1.1 billion) as part of a plan to improve shareholder returns and reduce the group's capital requirements, having paid $2.9 billion in 2006 and incurring a large loss on sale. Athene subsequently sold the life insurance business of Aviva to Global Atlantic.

On 13 April 2015, Aviva completed the £5.6 billion all share takeover of Friends Life Group. Andy Briggs, then group chief executive of Friends Life, became CEO of Aviva UK Life, with Mark Wilson continuing as CEO of the enlarged Aviva Group. In July 2016, Aviva froze withdrawals from the Aviva Investors Property Trust because of a lack of liquidity after Britain's vote to leave the European Union on 23 June. In September 2017, Aviva agreed to sell its Italian joint venture Avipop Assicurazioni to Banco BPM for US$312.01 million (€265 million).

In March 2018, Aviva, controversially, announced that it "had the ability" to cancel its irredeemable preference shares at par. This caused a wider sell off in the preference share market in the United Kingdom. Also in March 2018 the company announced to spend around £600 million on so called "bolt on" acquisitions, that are in "Poland, Turkey, anywhere we have existing markets".

In October 2018, Mark Wilson agreed to step down as CEO with immediate effect, with Adrian Montague taking interim control of the company, pending Wilson's formal departure in 2019. Maurice Tulloch was appointed CEO in March 2019; however, he stood down in July 2020 for family health reasons and was replaced by Amanda Blanc, who previously served as an Independent Non-Executive Director of the company.

Also in July 2020, Aviva completed the sale of Friends Provident International Limited (FPIL) to RL360º. In November 2020, Aviva sold its stake in their Indonesian company Astra Aviva Life and their Hong Kong division.

In 2021, Aviva sold its French operations to Aéma Groupe. As part of the deal, Aviva agreed to indemnify Aéma against potential legal liabilities to Max-Hervé George. In May, Aviva completed the sale of its Turkish business, followed by businesses in Italy (Aviva Italia Holding), Poland and Vietnam in December 2021.

In April 2023, Aviva terminated its membership of the Confederation of British Industry in response to allegations made by former employees of sexual harassment and rape at the business group.

In September 2023, it was announced Aviva had acquired the London-headquartered life insurance company, AIG Life Limited from Corebridge Financial for £460 million.

In November 2023, Aviva acquired a Canadian vehicle replacement insurance business, Optiom, for £100 million (US$126 million).

In December 2024, Aviva agreed to acquire Direct Line Group for £3.7 billion, nearly a month after its previous bid of £3.3bn was rejected.

On 1 July 2025, Aviva completed the acquisition of Direct Line Group.

=== Constituent companies ===
Aviva is the result of the merger of hundreds of insurance companies over several centuries. Aviva was originally formed as CGNU from the merger of CGU and Norwich Union.

==== CGU ====
CGU was formed in 1998 from the merger of Commercial Union and General Accident.

===== Commercial Union =====
The Commercial Union Assurance Company was founded in 1861 as a result of insurance premium increases following the 1861 Tooley Street fire.

====== Hand in Hand ======
The Hand in Hand Fire and Life Insurance Society was established in 1696 as the Contributors for Insuring Houses, Chambers or Rooms from Loss by Fire, by Amicable Contribution. The name Hand in Hand came from its logo of two joined hands underneath a crown. In 1905 it became part of Commercial Union, at which time it was the oldest insurer in the UK.

====== British General ======
The British General Insurance Company was established in 1904. It became part of Commercial Union in 1926.

====== Northern and Employers ======
The Northern and Employers Assurance Company was formed in 1960 from the Northern Assurance Company and the Employers' Liability Assurance Company. It was acquired by Commercial Union in 1968.

====== Employers' Liability Assurance ======
The Employers' Liability Assurance Corporation was established in 1880, the first company to offer employers' liability insurance. It became part of the Northern and Employers Assurance Company in 1960.

====== Northern Assurance ======
The North of Scotland Fire and Life Assurance Company was formed in Aberdeen in 1836, and took the name Northern Assurance Company in 1848. It became part of the Northern and Employers Assurance Company in 1960.

====== White Cross ======
The White Cross Insurance Association was founded in 1906. Originally called the Red Cross Indemnity Assurance Company it was renamed in 1912 due to the restrictions on the red cross name and symbol placed by international law. It became part of Commercial Union in 1968.

====== North British and Mercantile ======
The North British and Mercantile Insurance Company (originally the North British Fire Office) was founded in 1809. It merged with the Mercantile Fire Insurance Company in 1862, and became part of Commercial Union in 1959.

====== Railway Passengers ======
The Universal Railway Casualty Compensation Company was formed in 1848 to insure travellers against accidents on the rapidly developing railways. This made it the first company established specifically to provide accident insurance. Later renamed the Railway Passengers Assurance Company, it became part of the North British and Mercantile Insurance Company in 1910.

====== West of England Fire and Life ======
The West of England Fire and Life Insurance Company was founded in 1807 in Exeter. It was acquired by Commercial Union in 1897.

===== General Accident =====
The General Accident and Employers' Liability Assurance Association was founded in 1885. In 1891 its business was taken over by a new entity, General Accident Fire and Life Assurance Corporation. General Accident was one of the first insurers to offer motor insurance, issuing its first policy in 1896.

====== General Life ======
The General Life Assurance Company (originally the Protestant Dissenters' and General Life and Fire Assurance Company) was formed in 1837, and became part of General Accident in 1925.

====== Yorkshire Insurance ======
The Yorkshire Fire and Life Insurance Company was founded in 1824. It was acquired by General Accident in 1968.

===== Gresham =====
Gresham Insurance Company (originally the Gresham Fire and Accident Insurance Society) was founded in 1910. It became part of CGU in 2005.

==== Norwich Union ====
Norwich Union Fire Insurance Society (originally the Norwich Union Society for Insuring of Buildings, Goods, Merchandises & Effects from Loss by Fire) was established in 1797. It was renamed Norwich Union Insurance in 1997.

===== Norwich and London =====
The Norwich and London Accident Insurance Association (originally the Norwich and London Accident and Casualty Insurance Association) was founded in 1856. It became part of Norwich Union Fire Insurance Society in 1909.

====== General Hail Storm ======
The General Hail Storm Insurance Society was established in 1843 to insure crops and glass against damage from hail. It became part of the Norwich and London Accident Insurance Association in 1909.

==== Friends Life ====
Friends Life was formed in 2011 from a combination of Friends Provident, the majority of AXA's life insurance business, and Bupa. It became part of Aviva in 2015.

===== Friends Provident =====
Friends Provident was formed in 1832 by Quakers in Yorkshire. It became part of Friends Life in 2011.

==== Direct Line ====
Direct Line was formed in 2012 from the insurance business of Royal Bank of Scotland. It became part of Aviva in 2025.

== Operations ==
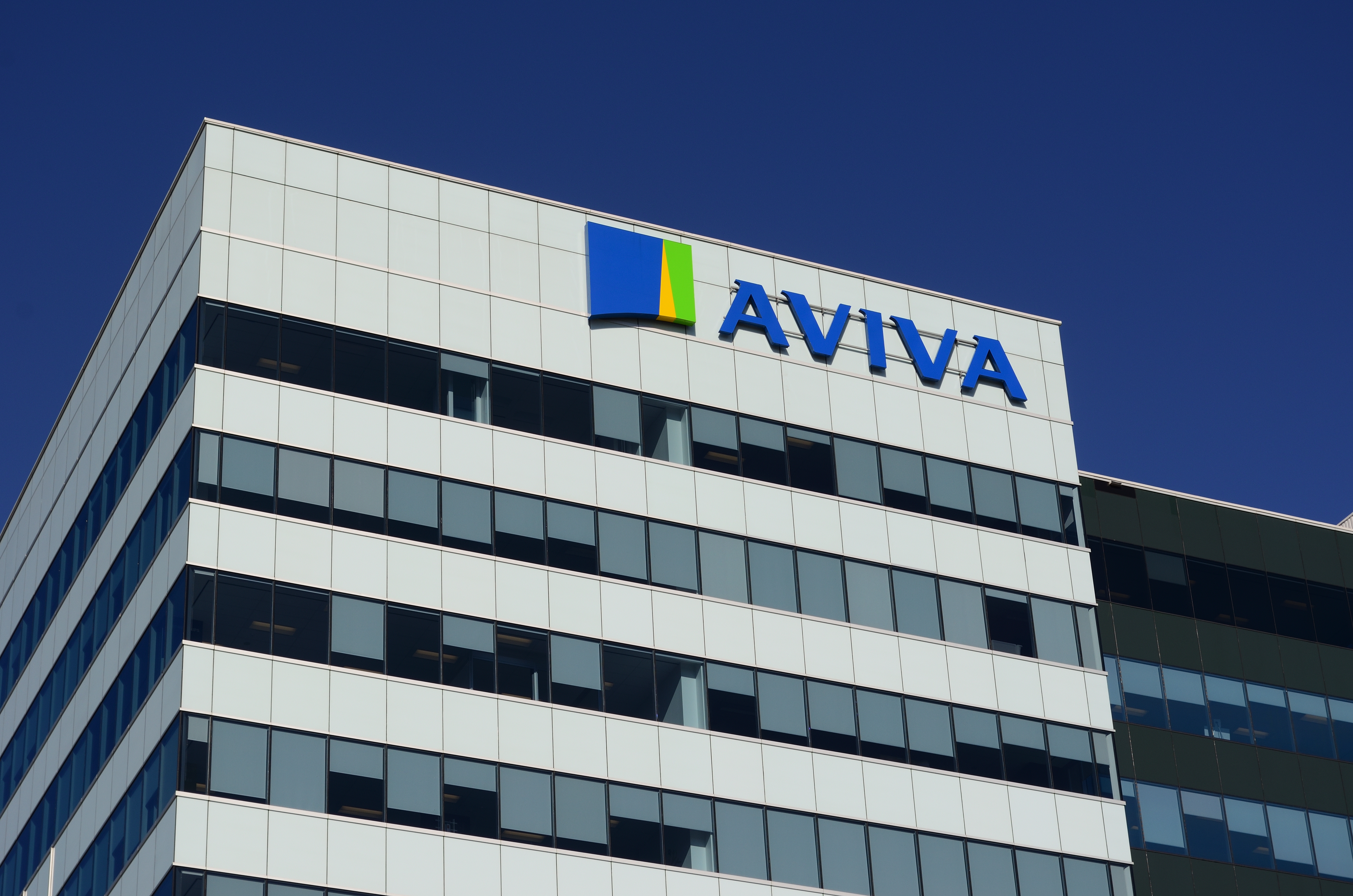
Aviva Canada

Aviva's main activities are the provision of general and life insurance, long term savings products and fund management services. The group has around 36,000 employees and 25.3 million customers. Aviva Investors has £273 billion assets under management as of 30 June 2026.

=== Principal subsidiaries ===
- United Kingdom
  - Insurance, Wealth & Retirement
  - Aviva Insurance – General Insurance (including the Quotemehappy brand)
  - Aviva Investors – Fund Management (formerly Morley)
- Canada – Aviva Canada
- China – Aviva-Cofco
- India – Aviva India
- Ireland – Aviva Group Ireland

== Finances ==
	2016	2017	2018	2019	2020	2021	2022	2023	2024	2025
Total income (£ billions; IFRS 4)	55.3	49.7	17.7	70.3	48.8	46.7	—	—	—	—
Insurance revenue (£ billions; IFRS 17)	—	—	—	—	—	—	16.9	18.5	20.7	25.4
Adjusted operating profit (£ billions)	3.0	3.1	3.0	3.2	3.2	2.3	1.4	1.5	1.8	2.2
Net income (£ billions)	0.7	1.5	1.6	2.5	2.8	2.0	−1.1	1.1	0.7	0.9
Total assets (£ billions)	440.4	442.7	429.5	460.0	479.9	358.5	309.6	328.8	353.9	395.3
Total equity (£ billions)	19.6	19.1	18.5	18.7	20.6	19.5	10.2	9.6	8.6	11.1
Employees	29,653	30,090	31,232	31,791	29,079	22,312	23,701	25,529	27,873	34,465

Total income for 2016–2021 includes net investment income and other income; insurance revenue from 2022 follows IFRS 17 and is a different measure. The two revenue series are not directly comparable.
