= Andy Briggs (businessman) =

British businessperson

- Born: 24 March 1966 (age 60)
- Occupations: Businessman; Chief executive, Standard Life plc

Andy Briggs MBE (born 24 March 1966) is a British businessman and chief executive of Standard Life plc. He previously served as the Aviva Chief Executive Officer UK Insurance and Global Life and Health as well as the Government Business Champion for Older Workers and NSPCC trustee.

== Early life and education ==
Briggs grew up in Chelmsford, Essex, and went to King Edward VI Grammar School, Chelmsford. He has a BSc Honours in Mathematics and Actuarial studies from the University of Southampton.

== Career ==
In 1987, Briggs started his career at Prudential as an actuarial trainee and stayed with the firm for nineteen years, becoming chief executive of the Prudential Group's Retirement Income business UK and Europe. After leaving Prudential in 2006, he worked at Scottish Widows and Lloyds Banking Group before joining Friends Life as Group CEO. Aviva acquired Friends Life in April 2015 with Briggs becoming Chief Executive of the UK and Ireland Life business.

In January 2017, it was announced that Aviva would merge its UK life and general insurance businesses. As part of this, Briggs was announced as the new CEO UK Insurance. He stood down from this role in April 2019.

In November 2019, Phoenix Group announced that their current CEO Clive Bannister would be standing down, with Briggs was to be [sic] appointed as CEO subject to regulatory approval. In February 2020, it was announced by Phoenix Group that Briggs had been appointed to the board of directors.

Briggs was awarded an MBE in the 2021 new year honours.

== Other interests ==
Briggs became chair of the Board of the Association of British Insurers in October 2016 for a two-year term. At the Conservative Party conference on 4 October 2016 his appointment as Government Business Champion for Older Workers with Business in the Community was announced.

He has also been a long-term supporter of the NSPCC, having joined the NSPCC Fundraising Committee in 2006 and is the current committee chair. In 2016 he became a trustee of the NSPCC.

== Personal life ==
Briggs is married with four children. He was awarded an MBE in the 2021 New Year Honours.
