= SunLife =

UK-based insurance business and part of the Phoenix Group

SunLife Ltd
- Formerly: Sun Life Direct
- Company type: Limited
- Industry: Financial services
- Founded: 1810
- Headquarters: United Kingdom
- Area served: United Kingdom
- Key people: Mark Screeton (CEO)
- Products: Life insurance; Equity release
- Number of employees: 100
- Parent: Standard Life plc
- Website: www.sunlife.co.uk

SunLife Ltd is a life assurance and equity release business operating in the UK which is owned by Standard Life plc.

Founded in 1810, the company is best known for its range of services for people aged 50 and over. In 1900, they became the first company to offer life insurance without a medical.

SunLife is regulated by the Financial Conduct Authority and their qualifying products are covered by the Financial Services Compensation Scheme. The company is a member of the Data & Marketing Association. Their partners are also members of the Equity Release Council (Key Group) and the Funeral Planning Authority (Dignity Funerals).

== History ==
=== 1800 to 1900 ===
SunLife can trace its history back to the establishment of the Sun Life Assurance Society on 28 March 1810, when the Sun Fire Office Board launched a separate company to offer life assurance. The society's first office opened opposite the Bank of England in London, and actuary Joshua Milne was appointed the first member of staff.

During its first 12 months, Sun Life Assurance Society wrote 132 policies for a total sum assured of £163,150. The premium income was £6,077. At an 1815 board meeting it was decided that, for the future, burial as well as death certificates would be required to substantiate claims.

In 1835, the Society appointed its first Medical Officer to assist in the selection of lives for Assurance. Dr Henry Herbert Southey had previously been a Physician-in-Ordinary to the Monarch in 1823, and later Physician-Extraordinary for Queen Adelaide. Amongst the life assurance candidates was Charles Dickens in 1838, whose application was declined by the Society on the grounds that he “works too much”. The first Sun Fire Office salesman, Edward Trescott Liddell, was hired in 1865.

1884 became a landmark year as Sun Life Assurance Society issued more than 1000 policies for the first time. In 1891, the company set up the Sun Life Assurance Company of India, with offices at 7 Council House Street, Calcutta, and a local Board of Directors. Harris Saunders was the Actuary and General Manager.

=== 1900 to 2000 ===
Sun Life Assurance Society's first monthly premium plan was introduced in 1900. Towards the end of that year, they became the first company in the industry to offer life assurance without a medical examination. In 1921, the non-medical scheme was finalised, meaning approved people aged 50 or over could get immediate whole of life cover without the need for a medical examination.

In the years leading up to the Second World War, Sun Life Assurance Society owned East Hall, a house in the outskirts of Orpington. In 1938, it was made into a Southern Divisional Centre in preparation for the war.

In 1965, the 155 years of close association between Sun Life and the Sun Fire Office came to an end. The break was a result of the formation of the Sun Alliance and London Group. When Sun Alliance made a successful bid for London Assurance, it resulted in a conflict of interest with Sun Life, so it was agreed that they would go their separate ways.

From the 1970s SunLife split their headquarters between London and Bristol. The head office moved to Bristol in 1976–1977. Within a year, Sun Life began sending out direct mail. They introduced their very first plan for people aged over 50 in 1979. In 1982, they became the world's first life assurance company to announce a £200,000 non-medical limit.

In 1992, French insurer UAP became Sun Life Assurance Society's major shareholder. In 1995, Sun Life Assurance Society merged with Provincial Insurance Company and established the holding company, Sun Life & Provincial Holdings.

=== 2000 to present ===
In May 2000, Axa acquired all shares it did not already own in the company. The business was renamed Axa Sun Life Direct, and then Sun Life Direct in 2009.

Axa sold its main life assurance business to Resolution Group in 2010 and continued to sell life insurance products through Sun Life Direct. Dean Lamble, formerly of Aviva, was appointed Managing Director. He was named CEO in 2016.

Sun Life Direct rebranded to SunLife in 2014. In the same year, SunLife announced a range of savings products, including stocks and shares ISAs.

In 2016, Axa sold its UK investment, pensions and insurance businesses, including SunLife, to UK insurer Phoenix Group in a £375 million deal.

Phoenix Group became Standard Life plc in March 2026.

== Business activities ==
=== Over 50s life insurance ===
SunLife offers two whole-of-life insurance plans. The first is called the Guaranteed Over 50 Plan. This is provided by Phoenix Life Limited and currently has over 800,000 policy holders. The second is called the Guaranteed Inheritance Plan. This is provided by iptiQ Life S.A.

=== Equity release ===
SunLife offers equity release. This is arranged and administered by Key Group.

=== Funeral plans ===
SunLife previously offered a funeral plan called the SunLife Guaranteed Funeral Plan. Dignity Funerals Ltd arranges and provides the funeral services.

== Brand and image ==
=== The logo ===
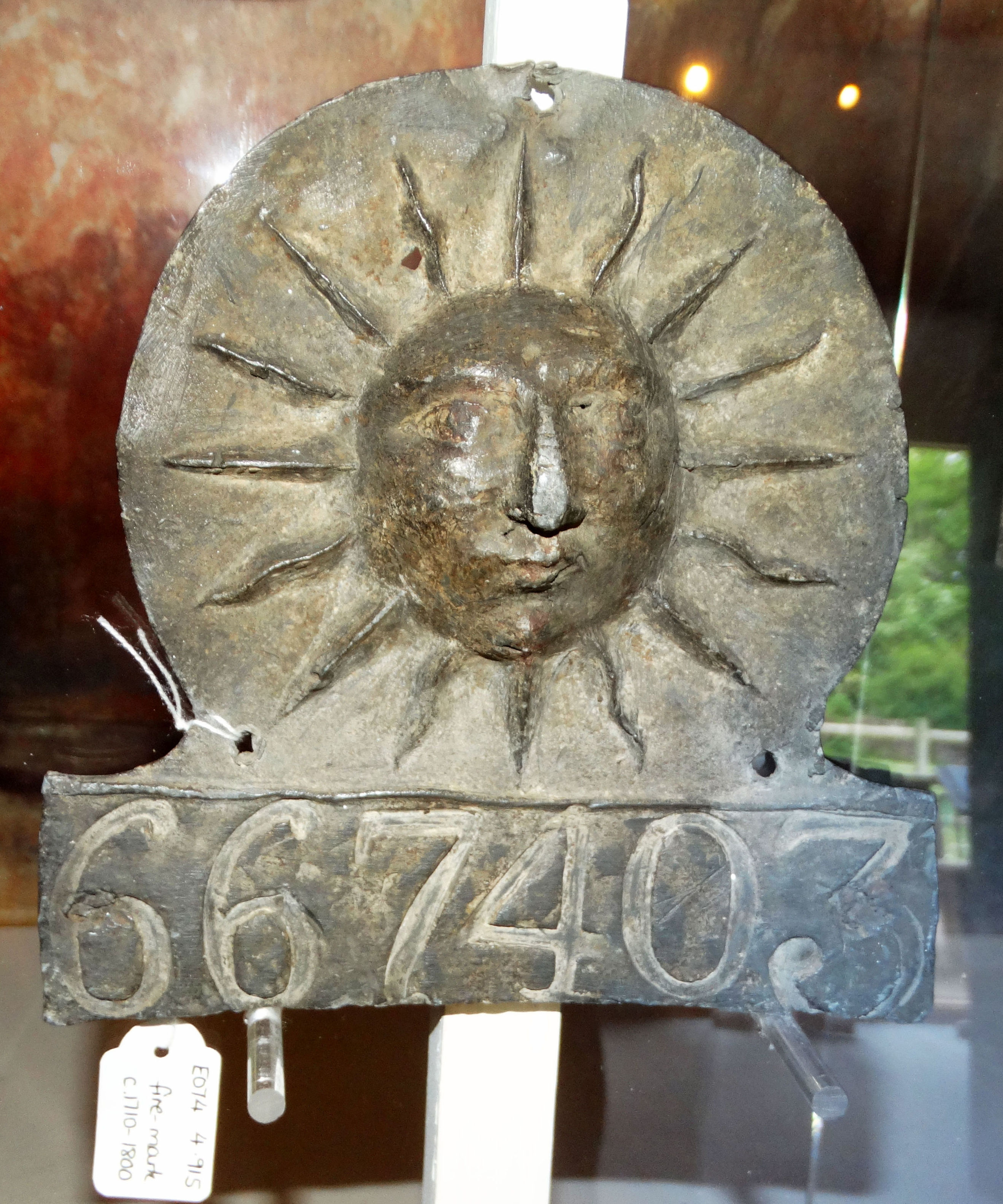
A Sun Fire Office insurance mark

The SunLife logo originates from the fire insurance marks that were utilised within the UK from the late seventeenth century to the beginning of the twentieth. These plaques were displayed on the insured buildings and indicated the organisation with whom they were insured. The first to use the mark was the Sun Fire Office.

=== Advertising ===
SunLife is known for their use of celebrity personalities in their advertising, including Michael Parkinson and Carol Vorderman.

=== Sponsorship ===
SunLife sponsored ITV Weather from 1996 to 1997.
