= Employment Ice Age =

Period in Japan, 1994–2004

The youth unemployment rate in OECD countries (ages 15–24), from 1990 to 2020.

The Employment Ice Age (Japanese: 就職氷河期, romanized: Shūshoku Hyōgaki) is a term in Japan that refers to a period starting around 1994 and ending by 2004 where young graduates, as well as those who had lost their first jobs due to the Bubble Economy collapsing, were unable to find stable sources of employment. This phenomenon took place during the Lost Decades, and the cohort affected, Generation X, came to be referred to as the "Lost Generation" or the "Ice Age Generation".

The phenomenon was triggered by the burst of the Japanese "Bubble Economy", which although initially believed to be a temporary recession, by 1994 saw long-term economic stagnation in the Japanese economy, ushering in the uncertainties of the "Lost Decade". To cut costs and protect older workers, companies offered limited numbers of jobs, shutting recent graduates out of the workforce, thus triggering the "Employment Ice Age".

Those affected by the Employment Ice Age became accustomed to unstable and temporary employment, if any at all. The period severely affected Generation X (people in their 40s and 50s in 2020), encouraging social issues such as the development of the hikikomori, a spike in suicide rates, and the phenomenon of jōhatsu, as well as impacting their financial well-being, health, outlook, and ability to start families.

Given Japan's aging population, there is concern that government focus on the elderly has overshadowed those too poor to have ever started a family, who themselves will be moving into old age largely devoid of the financial resources other generations had. Government efforts on this matter have been deemed far too little and too late, and Nikkei writers claim that lawmakers remain unaware of the gravity of the situation.

== Economic impact ==
Japan's asset price bubble collapse in 1991 led to a period of economic stagnation known as the "Lost Decade", sometimes extended as the "Lost 20 Years" or greater. From 1995 to 2007, the GDP of Japan fell from $5.33 trillion to $4.36 trillion in nominal terms. From the early 2000s, the Bank of Japan set out to encourage economic growth through a novel policy of quantitative easing. Debt levels continued to rise due to the 2008 financial crisis, the 2011 Tōhoku earthquake and tsunami and Fukushima nuclear disaster, and the COVID-19 pandemic. As of 2021, Japan had significantly higher levels of public debt than any other developed nation, at approximately 260% of GDP.

=== Before ===
The Japanese economy is a highly developed free-market economy. It is the world's second-largest developed economy. It is the third-largest in the world by nominal GDP and the fourth-largest by purchasing power parity (PPP). Japan is a member of both the G7 and G20.

From the mid-1970s to 1985, after the 1973 Oil Crisis, the ratio of new jobs in the Japanese labor market to applicants was between 0.9 and 1, remaining under 1.0 through 1987. However, the ratio of active job openings to applicants was between 0.6 and 0.7. (Note: The job-openings-to-applicants ratio is calculated based on the number of effective job openings and job seekers to indicate how many jobs per job applicant are available in a certain period.)

=== During ===
Due to the Plaza Accord in September 1985 and a cultural appreciation of the yen, the Japanese economy became a bubble economy, led by domestic demand, with a low-interest rate policy. Native Japanese companies reached record highs in their stock prices, which led to excessive capital and profit. In 1989, the Tokyo Stock Exchange reached another high index of USD$40,000 due to the Japanese economy's profits.

The employment ratio of "new jobs to job offers given to applicants" went up by 3 points, to 1.43 in 1991.

=== After ===
The Bank of Japan, in an effort to combat the economic stagnation in 1989, sharply raised inter-bank lending rates. This caused the figurative "pop" of the Japanese economic bubble, starting the new decade off with a recession not seen since the post-war period. This caused the fall of equity and asset prices, which led to overly-leveraged Japanese banks and insurance companies with books full of bad debt. The financial institutions were bailed out through capital infusions from the government, loans and cheap credit from the central bank, and the ability to postpone the recognition of losses, ultimately turning them into zombie banks.

These banks injected the funds they got from bailouts into what would be zombie funds, saying the funds were too big to fail. This later became one of the reasons for Japanese economic stagnation in the 1990s, and the reduction of national banks in Japan to just four. However, since the banks could only survive with government bailouts, these funds failed anyway, and so did the banks in the 2000s.

The ratio of "new jobs to job offers given to applicants" reached its lowest level at 0.45 in 2009, but climbed to a record high at 1.62 in 2018. As of July 2022, it was 1.25. (Note: Jobs to Applicants Ratio: An indicator published on a monthly basis by Ministry of Health, Labour and Welfare (https://www.mhlw.go.jp/english/) is a comprehensive assessment of supply and demand balance in the Japanese labor market and national economic development indicating employment health in the economy. It is limited to recruitment and job seeking through the Public Employment Security Office Japan. The ratio represents the ratio of job seekers to job openings excluding new graduates. A higher-than-expected number should be taken as positive to JPY, while a lower-than-expected number as negative.)

== Social impact ==
This failing economy kicked off what would be called the Japanese Lost Generation; in the 1990s, this consisted of college graduates who were unable to find employment and thus suffered the economic consequences. In subsequent decades, they were only able to find low-paying, part-time jobs due to the extreme influence of the popping of the economic bubble. By 2020, these same graduates were middle-aged.

The Lost Generation presents the "8050 Problem", which described a situation where middle-aged, reclusive, and unemployed Japanese still depended on their elderly parents for housing and financial assistance. The group is defined loosely as those aged 35 to 44 who left school between the mid-1990s and mid-2000s, were unable to get permanent jobs, and ended up flitting from one low-wage, dead-end part-time job to another. Japan has an estimated 613,000 middle-aged hikikomori, a term usually used to describe socially withdrawn adolescents who hole up in their bedrooms, according to the results of a government survey released in March 2019, these shut-ins deserve acceptance and a place within society.

Employment in Japan by age group, 2022

Japanese employers are accustomed to hiring fresh graduates whom they can train and mould from scratch. However, this preference makes it more difficult for older or less-educated workers to re-enter the job market and find stable employment, and thus prolongs any initial loss of employment opportunities. One potential key reason why the Lost Generation in particular prompted a wider recognition of this "youth employment problem" was the generation's relatively large population size, as Japanese society was unable to withstand its considerable quantitative impact.

=== Violence ===
Many of Japan's recent violent crimes may have been caused by social unrest created by the Employment Ice Age. For instance, Michinao Kono—the knife-wielding man who killed two and injuring 19 in May 2019—was an out-of-work 45-year-old who had never left his parents' home. The "Joker attack" on 1 November 2021 was committed by Kyoto Hotori, an unemployed man who was discontented with society at large. Former Prime Minister Shinzo Abe's assassin, Tetsuya Yamagami, was a former member of the Japan Self-Defense Forces who had difficulties finding a full-time job.

=== Support ===
Since Japan’s postwar period, the Employment Ice Age was the first to reveal the necessity for young people to receive support from society.

When those in need try and get help, they are asked to work harder, and if that doesn't work, their families are expected to support them.

— Hiroto Watanabe, "Tatawanakereba Shakai wa Kowareru" ("Society Will Collapse if We Don’t Fight")

On 1 January 2020, amid chronic labour shortages in the country's tightest job market, the Japanese government appealed among employers for a major exemplar shift to hire 3 million "Employment Ice Age Generation" workers as full-time employees. At the time, this group constituted 21.2 million "irregular" workers (37.9% of Japan's workforce), for whom the Japanese government pledged to spend ¥65 billion (USD$962 million) over the next three years. (Note: Mr. Yukio Okubo, director of think-tank Recruit Works Institute, told Nikkei Business magazine: "Rather than focusing on a single generation, giving opportunities for everyone who has not had the chance to skill up should be at the center of the debate." He added: "Forcing employment is the wrong policy. Without skills, people cannot get motivated and perform well in the work they are expected to do. This just leads to a downward spiral.")

=== Low birthrate ===
Japan's birth rate is among the lowest in world. In 2020, the expected number of births per woman in Japan declined to 1.34. A major cause of the declining number of births is the fact that women are delaying marriage. According to the Health Ministry, the number of registered marriages fell 12.3% in 2020, to 525,490. Since Japanese women traditionally expect men to be providers, men who do not make enough to support a family either cannot find partners or feel so underconfident that they do not bother. The result is the Japanese phenomenon called sōshoku-kei danshi ("grass-eaters" or "herbivore men"), referring to 75% of Japanese males in their 20s to 40s who do not date or marry.

== See also ==
- Lost Decades
- Herbivore men
