= Aviva Group Ireland =

Irish insurance group

Aviva Group Ireland plc
- Company type: Public
- Industry: Insurance
- Founded: 1908
- Headquarters: Dublin, Ireland
- Products: Life Insurance; Pensions
- Parent: Aviva
- Website: www.aviva.ie

Aviva Group Ireland plc is the Irish arm of British insurance firm Aviva plc. Its headquarters are in Dublin. The company also provides investment management and pension services.

D&B Hoovers reported in October 2010 that Aviva is the largest general insurer in Ireland, with a market share of more than 20% in the country.

== History ==
The company was established in 1908 as Hibernian. In 1925, the Guardian Assurance Company Ltd purchased a majority shareholding in the company and by 1931, it was offering fire, accident, motor, fidelity guarantee and plate glass insurance. Guardian Assurance sold the company to a consortium of Irish firms, including the Bank of Ireland, in 1935.

The company started to transact engineering business in 1940, and in 1946 added marine insurance in partnership with the Irish National Insurance Company Ltd. In 1964, the Commercial Union Assurance Company Ltd acquired the majority shareholding from the Bank of Ireland and two years later changed the company’s name to the Hibernian Insurance Company Ltd. By 1969, Commercial Union owned 99.9% of shares in the company.

A consortium of Irish investors acquired the majority shareholding in the company in 1979, while Commercial Union retained a 30% share of the company. The company was acquired by CGU plc in November 1999. It later became part of Aviva.

In June 2008, the company announced that it was to transfer much of its operations to Bangalore, India with the loss of 580 jobs. In the same year, Hibernian announced that it would be rebranding as Aviva as part of a global rebranding campaign to have all Aviva’s subsidiaries operate under the same name. Also in 2008, the Central Bank of Ireland fined the company for various breaches of the Consumer Protection Code.

The company dismantled its Dublin-based European holding company in April 2011, moving the operation from London. In the same year, the Central Bank of Ireland again fined Aviva for failing to have proper controls and procedures surrounding the safeguarding of client assets.

In 2018, Aviva acquired the business of Friends' First from Dutch company Achmea. The business had earlier been part of Friends Provident until it was demutualised in 1992, rolled into Eureko and later rebranded as Friends' First in 1998.

== Aviva Stadium ==
It was announced in February 2009 that the new stadium on Lansdowne Road in Dublin would be called the Aviva Stadium as a result of a ten-year deal with Aviva reported to be worth €40 million.

== See also ==
- Healthcare in the Republic of Ireland
