= Mark Wilson (businessman) =

New Zealand businessesman

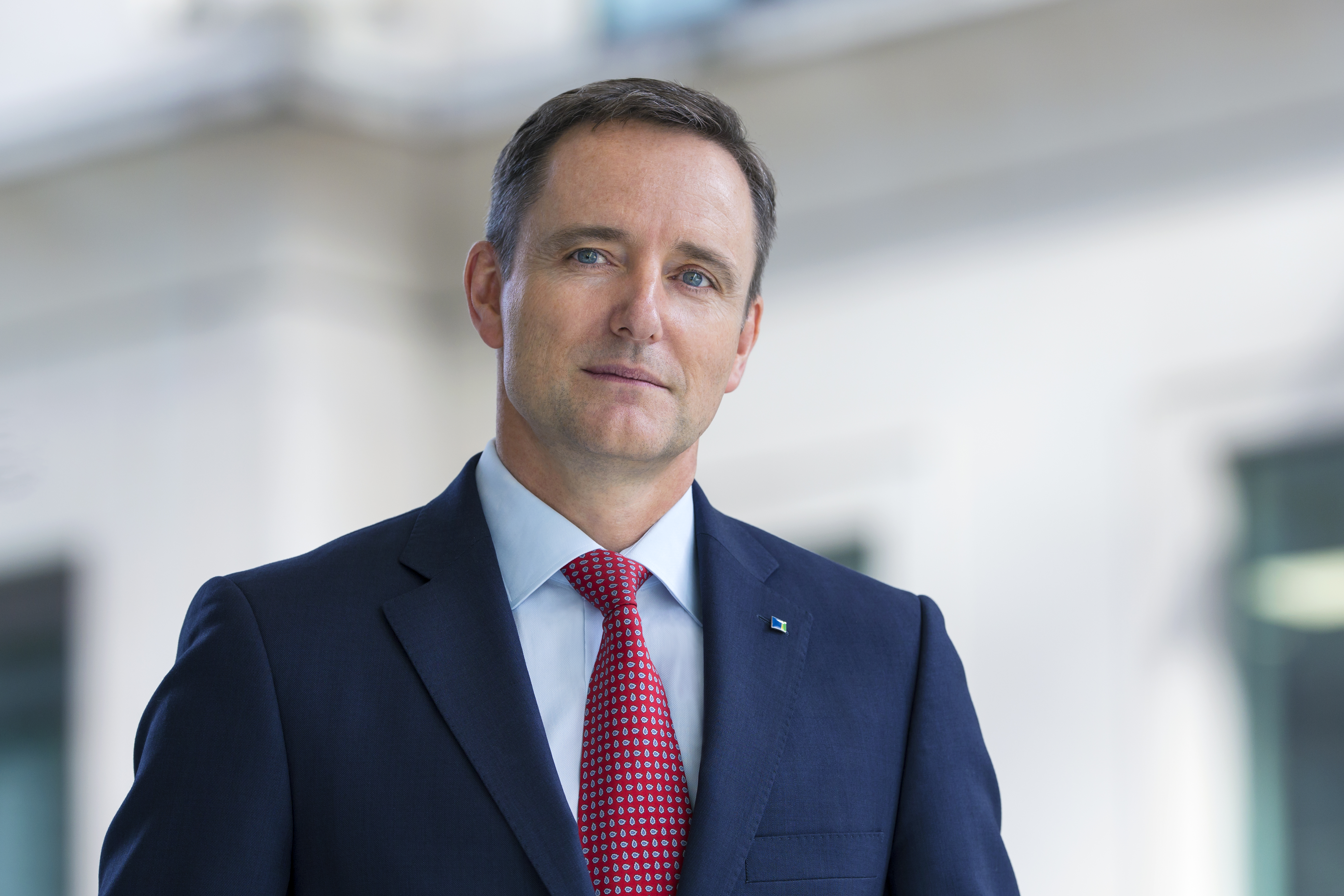
- Mark Wilson in 2016
- Born: Mark Andrew Wilson; 22 August 1966 (age 60)
- Education: University of Waikato
- Occupation: Businessman
- Title: Former CEO, Aviva
- Term: 2013–2018
- Predecessor: Andrew Moss
- Successor: Maurice Tulloch
- Board member of: BlackRock
- Children: 3

Mark Andrew Wilson (born 22 August 1966) is a New Zealand businessman, who was chief executive officer (CEO) of Aviva from 2013 to 2018.

== Early life and education ==
Wilson grew up in Rotorua, New Zealand and was educated at the University of Waikato.

== Career ==
Wilson joined National Mutual, an insurance business based in New Zealand in 1987, and progressed through the management structure. He became chief executive of AXA Southeast Asia in 2001, chief executive of AXA Hong Kong in 2003 and chief executive of AIA in March 2009. He went on to become chief executive officer (CEO) of Aviva on 1 January 2013. In March 2018, Wilson was appointed as a non-executive director of BlackRock.

Wilson was named in the 2016 Debrett's list of Britain's 500 most influential people, a group of individuals who have influenced or made a difference to British society. He was included in that year's list for his role in returning the British insurer to profit and finalising the £5.6bn acquisition of Friends Life, the largest takeover in the insurance sector in nearly 15 years. The merger turned Aviva into one of the UK's largest investors, managing £300bn-plus in assets.

In 2016 Wilson was ranked 12th in Bloomberg's evaluation of the world's best value CEOs. Bloomberg looked at the pay-for-performance ratio of 100 CEOs at some of the largest companies around the world to see which companies are getting the best value from their CEO.

Wilson was listed in the 2016 Debrett's 500 List as one Britain's most influential people in finance for returning the insurance multinational to profit and overseeing the Friends Life acquisition.

=== Business experience ===
Wilson was credited with steering AIA through the financial crisis – a period that saw parent company AIG bailed out by the US government. He prepared AIA for its flotation on the stock market in Hong Kong in 2010, increasing the company's value to $36bn at the time of listing.

He has continued his turnaround work at Aviva, which had run into difficulty at the point of his arrival. Wilson refocused its life and general insurance businesses and bolstered its balance sheet. Under Wilson's leadership, Moody's upgraded Aviva Plc's senior unsecured debt rating to A2 from A3 and Aviva Plc's commercial paper rating to P-1 from P-2.

Having turned around Aviva's performance, he is now looking to transform Aviva into a fintech firm. Opening 'Digital Garages', setting up a new insurance digital business in Hong Kong with Chinese internet company Tencent and private equity firm Hillhouse Capital, Aviva’s development of the MyAviva digital platform and its broader investment in digital transformation have been cited as examples of initiatives undertaken during Wilson’s tenure aimed at advancing the company’s digital capabilities.

=== Social purpose ===
On 25 September 2015 Wilson joined 193 world leaders to commit to the Sustainable Development Goals at the United Nations in New York. In a rare opportunity for a private sector CEO, Wilson addressed a UN General Assembly plenary session on behalf of the global business community, calling for business and governments to work together to achieve the Sustainable Development Goals. He was also a leader in setting up the World Benchmarking Alliance, a set of league tables scoring companies against their sector peers on their responses to major sustainability issues. Wilson stated his aim as being to “turn the SDGs into a corporate competitive sport”.

He is also a member of the EAT Foundation advisory board, which he joined in June 2017. The Foundation’s ambition is to reform the global food system so that it is sustainable and supports a growing global population with healthy food from a healthy planet.

Wilson has written about various social issues including putting the brakes on fraudulent insurance claims, and ensuring everyone plays their part to keep the flood threat at bay.

Wilson is a chairman of the Geneva Association, the international think-tank of the insurance industry.

He is a member of the development board of the Royal Foundation for the Duke and Duchess of Cambridge and the Duke and Duchess of Sussex.

He stepped down from his position as CEO of Aviva on 9 October 2018.

== Awards ==
Wilson received a distinguished alumni award from Waikato University in 2017.
