= Maurice Tulloch =

British/Canadian businessman (born 1969)

- Born: March 1969 (age 56); Falkirk, Scotland
- Education: University of Waterloo; Heriot-Watt University
- Title: Former CEO, Aviva
- Term: March 2019 – July 2020
- Predecessor: Mark Wilson
- Successor: Amanda Blanc

Maurice Tulloch (born March 1969) is a British/Canadian businessman, who was the chief executive officer (CEO) of Aviva from March 2019 to July 2020.

== Early life ==
Tulloch was born in March 1969 in Falkirk, Scotland. He has dual British and Canadian nationality.

He earned a bachelor's degree in economics from the University of Waterloo in Canada and an MBA from Heriot-Watt University in Edinburgh. He is a Chartered Professional Accountant (CPA, CMA).

== Career ==
Tulloch joined Aviva in 1992, rising to CEO, international insurance and chairman of global general insurance. Tulloch joined the board of directors in June 2017.

On 4 March 2019, Tulloch succeeded Mark Wilson, who was ousted as CEO of Aviva in October 2018. He stepped down from his position for 'family health reasons in July 2020, and was replaced by Amanda Blanc.
