= Brotherhood of American Yeomen =

American secret fraternal benefit society

- BAY
- Founded: February 25, 1897; 129 years ago Bancroft, Iowa, US
- Type: Benefit society
- Affiliation: Independent
- Status: Defunct
- Successor: Yeomen Mutual Life Insurance Company
- Scope: North America
- Member badge
- Publication: The Yeoman Shield
- Chapters: 3,191
- Members: 285,948 (December 31, 1920) lifetime
- Former name: Farmer's Mutual
- Headquarters: Des Moines, Iowa; United States

Brotherhood of American Yeomen (acronym, BAY; originally, Farmer's Mutual) was a coeducational North American secret fraternal benefit society organized in 1897. In 1932, the organization was changed to Yeomen Mutual Life Insurance Company, a mutual, legal reserve, level premium company later known as AmerUs.

== History ==
Brotherhood of American Yeomen (BAY) was a coeducational North American secret fraternal benefit society. J.E. and C.B. Paul established BAY as Farmer's Mutual on February 25, 1897, at Bancroft, Iowa. Its name was changed to the Brotherhood of American Yeomen before its articles of incorporation were filed. It had chapters across the United States and also had members in Canada. It furnished family protection; there was also a juvenile department (for children of age 1–16). Men and women were admitted on equal terms.

Within the years 1917 to 1923, the BAY had effected a complete reversal of its former inadequate rate policy and set itself towards complete solvency. To provide an immediate funeral benefit, the Brotherhood attached a funeral coupon check to each of its new Class C certificates. This was good for one-tenth of the face of the certificate and was payable to the beneficiary immediately upon the death of the member if desired. All that was necessary was to cut off the coupon, take it to any bank, or send it to the supreme office, and if properly endorsed, it could be cashed at once. It had 26,203 members in 1908, growing to 43,212 members in 1917.

A report on the BAY's business of 1920 to State insurance departments demonstrated that the Brotherhood continued to be one of the big leaders of the American fraternal system. The figures indicated that it recovered from the war and influenza period. It enjoyed favorable mortality, and the management guided its course with special ability, pressing to the utmost for gains in members and insurance, and took advantage of opportunities to strengthen its financial position. In that year, the BAY was 24 years old, having been organized on February 25, 1897. Two-thirds of the active societies of the U.S. and Canada were older. A tabulation in Statistics Fraternal Societies showed that 140 going societies in 1920 were organized before the BAY, and 68 came into existence since. Yet the BAY stood fifth among all these societies in membership, having 285,948 benefit members on December 31, 1920. It stood sixth in the table of insurance in force, that item reaching US$367,882,000. The net increase of membership in 1920 was 12,122, and US$14,604,500.

In the preceding four years, the membership grew from a little over 200,000 to its new figure, which, with four months of 1921 to the credit of the field department, was about 300,000. So energetic was the field department of the BAY that it stood third among all societies for the production of new business. The average age of the members decreased by .23 of a year in 1920, starting at 38.81 on January 1 and ending at 38.58 on December 31st. The mortality per 1,000 members decreased from 8.24 in 1919 to 7.8 in 1920. The cost of management per member in 1920 was US$1.52. In 1919, it was US$1.53. In the same year, Editor Harry C. Evans of the Yeoman's official organ, The Yeoman Shield, suggested that the national conclave took action to simplify the titles of the officers. Instead of having a "Grand Foreman", he would have a president; instead of a "Grand Master" of ceremonies, a vice-president; "Chief Correspondent" would be changed to the secretary, and “Grand Master of Accounts" to the treasurer. He cited some of the titles in the fraternal world-Supreme Ruler, Supreme Regent, Supreme Ranger, Supreme Oracle, Supreme Mystic Ruler-and exclaimed, "That's the limit!" He wondered that some of the societies hadn't called their president the "Supreme Being", and added that other titles, if less ambitious, were as amusing.

In 1923, the 3,191 subordinate lodges had 208,782 benefit and 7,607 "social and auxiliary" members, while the juvenile department had 5,607 members. There were 100,000 BAY members in 1930. The headquarters were at Des Moines, Iowa.

In May 1932, the BAY became a mutual, legal reserve, level premium company called Yeomen Mutual Life Insurance Company. Yeomen Mutual Life Insurance Company changed its name to American Mutual Life Insurance Co. in 1938. American Mutual Life merged with Central Life Insurance in 1994, forming AmerUs Life. AmerUs was purchased by the British insurance company Aviva in 2006, for $2.9 billion.

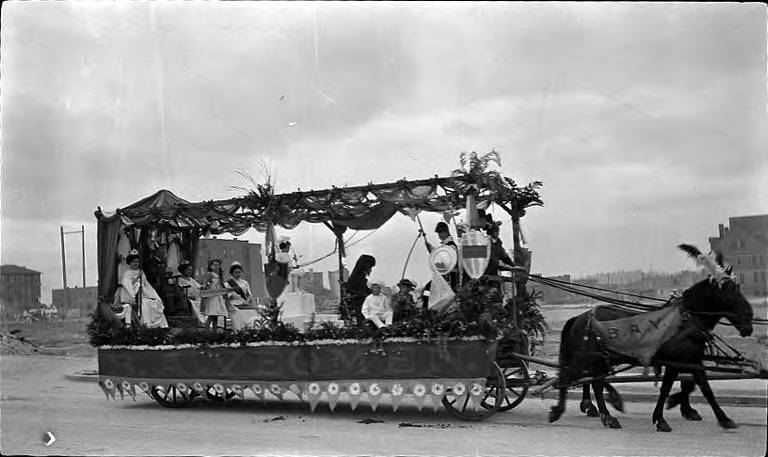
Brotherhood of American Yeomen parade float, Golden Potlatch in Seattle on July 18, 1912

== Symbols and traditions ==
The name Yeoman was chosen for its historic use for those who owned lands; BAY was formed the help farmers.

The Supreme Conclave was its governing body. Its officers were the grand foreman, the grand master, the chief correspondent, and the grand master of accounts. Its lodges or branches were called "Homesteads". Its supreme office (headquarters) was known as "Castle". Its members were called archers.

Its ritual included "signs, passwords, and obligations" and was based on Sir Walter Scott's Ivanhoe. BAY's publication was The Yeoman Shield.

Its pin was a black enameled circle, with a bow and arrow, at tension and pointing upward, with the word "Yeomen" below, all embossed in gold.
