= AmerUs =

Defunct American life insurance company

AmerUs (also known as AmerUs Life or AmerUs Group) was an American financial services company based in Des Moines, Iowa.

== History ==
The Brotherhood of American Yeomen was established in 1897. It was renamed "Yeoman Mutual Life" in 1932, and "American Mutual Life" in 1938. American Mutual Life merged with Central Life Insurance in 1994, forming AmerUs Life. In 2006, AmerUs was purchased by Aviva for $2.9 billion.
