= Aviva Canada =

Canadian insurance group

Aviva Canada Inc.
- Formerly: CGU Group Canada
- Industry: Insurance
- Predecessor: Commercial Union; General Accident
- Founded: 31 March 1999
- Headquarters: Markham, Ontario
- Key people: Nav Dhillon, CEO
- Services: Home, Auto, Specialty and Business Insurance
- Number of employees: approx. 4,000 (2016)
- Parent: Aviva plc
- Website: www.aviva.ca

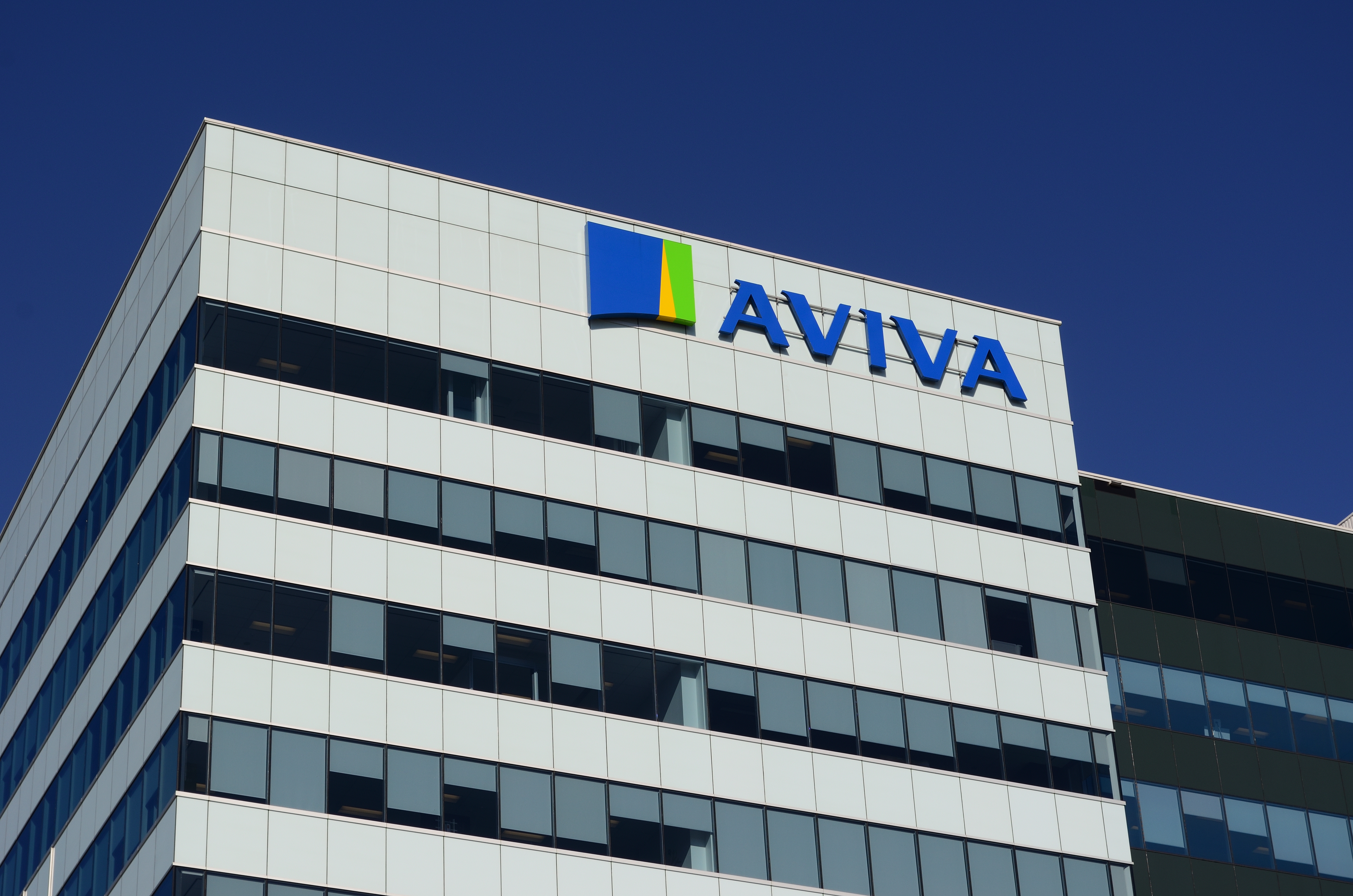
Aviva Canada's headquarters in Markham

Aviva Canada Inc. is a Canadian property and casualty insurance company and a wholly owned subsidiary of the UK-based Aviva plc. It provides home, personal, automobile, recreational vehicle, group and business insurance to more than three million customers.

== History ==
Aviva Canada came into being on 31 March 1999 as the CGU Group Canada, and was created through the merger of the Commercial Union Assurance Company of Canada and the General Accident Assurance Company of Canada. The merger was the result of the 1998 merger of the mother companies, Commercial Union and General Accident, to form CGU plc. After CGU merged with Norwich Union in 2000 to form Aviva, the Canadian subsidiary changed its name to Aviva Canada.

The operating subsidiaries of Aviva Canada Inc. are the Aviva Insurance Company of Canada, Aviva General Insurance Company, Elite Insurance Company, Pilot Insurance Company, Scottish & York Insurance Company, and Traders General Insurance Company.

Effective June 1, 2006 Aviva policyholders in Quebec who drive hybrid vehicles received a 10% discount. In March 2007, Aviva Canada began to offer "hole-in-one insurance" to organizations that sponsor golf tournaments across Canada. The Hole-in-One insurance product allows tournament organizers to offer a cash (or equivalent) prize to anyone who makes a hole-in-one on one of the par 3 holes. The product is coupled with an online quoting tool that can provide a quote in less than 15 seconds for insurance limits from C$5,000 to C$50,000.

In 2008, the company announced that these companies will now operate as Aviva Pilot and Aviva Scottish & York. Other companies in the Aviva Canada group of companies include: Elite Insurance Company (also known as Aviva Elite), Traders General Insurance Company (also known as Aviva Traders) and S&Y Insurance Company. The company also has financial ownership of insurance intermediaries including Ontario Insurance Service Limited (OIS), Insurance Agent Service Inc. and Wayfarer Insurance Brokers Limited. In April 2009, Aviva Canada announced its agreement to acquire the business of National Home Warranty Group of Companies.

On 26 February 2014, the company announced that it would be relocating its headquarters to a new 12-storey office building located in Downtown Markham. The building was slated to be completed in June 2017.

In June 2013, Aviva Canada was faced with one of the costliest natural disasters in Canadian history, "days of torrential rain inundated the city of Calgary, Alberta, and surrounding areas. The Bow and Elbow Rivers overflowed their banks, causing the evacuation of 26 neighborhoods and 100,000 people. Four died, and a state of emergency was declared in 32 communities." Insurable damages amounted to more than $1.7 billion.

On January 21, 2016, the company announced the acquisition of RBC General Insurance Company, for CAD$582 million.

In 2023, Aviva announced the appointment of Tracy Garrad as CEO of Aviva Canada. Garrad stepped down in June 2025 to return to the UK to be with family and named Nav Dhillon as interim CEO. On July 31, 2025, Aviva announced the appointment of Nav Dhillon as Chief Executive Officer of Aviva Canada. In this capacity, he reports to the Aviva Group CEO and is a member of Aviva’s Group Executive Committee.

== Partnerships ==
From 2015-2025, Aviva Canada was a partner of Tennis Canada and sponsor of the Rogers Cup tournament.

In 2017, Aviva Canada formed a partnership with Maple Leaf Sports & Entertainment (MLSE) to launch Toronto Raptors Insurance and Toronto Maple Leafs Insurance which covers home and auto insurance.

== Products and services ==
Aviva Canada offers Standard Insurance products such as Vehicle Insurance and Property insurance. Aviva insurance offer auto, home, travel, and recreational insurance, as well as commercial property, liability, and fleet insurance. The company also offers Non-Standard Insurance products such as Equine/Horse Insurance, Hole-in-One, and Prize Indemnity.
