= Amanda Blanc =

British businesswoman (born 1967)

Dame Amanda Blanc DBE
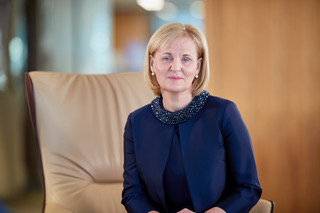
- Born: Amanda Jayne Blanc; 8 August 1967 (age 59)
- Education: University of Liverpool; University of Leeds
- Occupation: Businesswoman
- Years active: 1988–present
- Title: Group CEO, Aviva
- Term: July 2020–present
- Predecessor: Maurice Tulloch

Dame Amanda Jayne Blanc DBE (born 8 August 1967) is a Welsh businesswoman, who has been the group chief executive of Aviva since July 2020.

Blanc was previously CEO EMEA and Global Banking at Zurich Insurance Group and group chief executive of Axa UK, PPP and Ireland at Axa. She was the first woman to chair the Association of British Insurers and is a past president of the Chartered Insurance Institute. She has held a number of non-executive roles, including chair of the Welsh Professional Rugby Board.

== Early life ==
Blanc was born and brought up in Treherbert, Rhondda, Wales. She attended Treorchy Comprehensive School. Both her grandfathers were miners. She studied Modern History at the University of Liverpool and later graduated from the University of Leeds with an MBA, and Chartered Insurer (ACII).

== Career ==
After graduating, she obtained a graduate role with Commercial Union (which later became part of Aviva) in Luton. Blanc went on to become a fleet and casualty underwriter, then an area development manager and the youngest and first woman to work as a Commercial Union branch manager. She left Commercial Union in 1999 for EY and soon after joined Axa for the first time as Regional Director. In December 2003, she joined Groupama, in the newly created role of distribution and customer services director. In 2006, she moved to Towergate Insurance, where she had responsibility for the retail broking division, and in 2010 she was promoted to deputy chief executive.

Blanc joined Axa in February 2011 to lead the commercial division, at a time when it was rumoured that the UK business was to be put up for sale by its French parent company. The business survived and was later held up by Axa Group as a best practice example. At this time, Blanc received the Insurance Times 'CEOs CEO of the Year' award twice in three years (2013 and 2015). In 2015 she was given responsibility for the entire General Insurance division for Axa in UK & Ireland and then a year later became group chief executive of AXA UK, PPP & Ireland.

Blanc was announced as chief executive for Europe, the Middle East and Africa at Zurich in April 2018. A little over a year later she had resigned. Blanc did not comment on the reasons why but "personality clashes" between her and group chief executive Mario Greco were cited by sources. She was required to step down as chair of the ABI as protocol dictates that only a sitting insurance chief executive can hold the role.

After leaving Zurich, Blanc started in seven non-executive roles: three insurtech startups – Laka, Trov and RightIndem, OSG, Aviva PLC, Chair of specialist Lloyd's of London motor insurer ERS, and chair of the Welsh Professional Rugby Board, a voluntary position.

Blanc was the first woman to chair the ABI, and was previously chair of the ABI General Insurance committee. She was the first woman to chair the Insurance Fraud Bureau and served as president of the Chartered Insurance Institute. In April 2020 Blanc was asked by the Government to lead a review into the 2019 floods. The report was published in November 2020.

On 17 March 2021, Blanc was appointed HM Treasury's Women in Finance Champion, succeeding Dame Jayne-Anne Gadhia. In this role, she promoted the UK government’s Women in Finance Charter, aimed at improving gender diversity across the financial services sector. During her tenure, senior female representation in the industry increased from 32% to 36%. After five years in the role, Blanc stepped down in December 2025.

On 11 November 2021, Blanc joined the Geneva Association as a new board member, one of only two women on the board of directors of the insurance industry think tank.

In February 2022, she was appointed to UK Prime Minister Boris Johnson's new Business Council, advising the government on matters such as recovery from COVID-19 and unlocking global investment. On 25 April 2022, she was announced as co-chair of the UK Transition Plan Taskforce to develop the "gold standard" for UK firms’ climate transition plans.

On 1 September 2022, Amanda joined the board of energy company BP as a non-executive director, and in April 2024 was appointed senior independent director at BP plc. She is also a member of BP plc's Remuneration Committee and People and Governance Committee.

Speaking at a House of Commons Treasury Select Committee inquiry in December 2023, in the context of a discussion about senior role hiring, Blanc said "There is no non-diverse hire at Aviva without it being signed off by me and the chief people officer, not because I do not trust my team, but because I want to make sure that the process followed for that recruitment has been diverse, has been properly done, and is not just a phone call to a mate to say, ‘Would you like a job? Pop up and we will fix it up for you’."

== Honours and awards ==
Blanc was named Woman of Achievement in 2008 by Women in the City. The award recognises senior level women who actively promote and encourage the progress of women above and beyond their everyday job.

Blanc was also featured in Yahoo! Finance's 2019 HERoes Women Role Model Executives list due to her efforts to drive gender equality in the workplace, and in Forbes' 2021 and 2023 Power Women list, which showcases the world's 100 most influential women.

In 2022, she was named Insurance Personality of the Year at The British Insurance Awards and was recognised as one of the 100 Most Influential Women in Finance by Financial News. She has also been named in the Financial Times' 25 most influential women of 2022. The Sunday Times chose Amanda as their business person of the year in January 2023.

Blanc was ranked 33rd on Fortune's list of Most Powerful Women in 2023.

She was appointed Dame Commander of the Order of the British Empire (DBE) in the 2024 New Year Honours for services to business, gender equality and net-zero.

In December 2025, Blanc was included in Forbes’ list of the World’s Most Powerful Women.

== Personal life ==
Blanc is married with two daughters. She is an accomplished piano player and when growing up her ambition was to be a professional musician.

Blanc was a guest on the long running BBC Radio 4 series Desert Island Discs, hosted by Lauren Laverne in March 2023. She also represents Aviva as WWF's lead strategic partner in the insurance and pensions sector in both the UK and Canada.
