= Friends Life Group =

Guernsey-incorporated investment vehicle

- Company type: Public company
- Traded as: LSE: FLG
- Industry: Investments
- Founded: 2008
- Founder: Clive Cowdery
- Defunct: 2015
- Fate: Acquired by Aviva
- Headquarters: Saint Peter Port, Guernsey
- Key people: (Chairman); Andy Briggs (CEO)
- Services: Corporate buyouts and restructuring
- Revenue: £11,048 million (2014)
- Operating income: £64 million (2014)
- Net income: £(138) million (2014)
- Website: www.friendslifegroup.com

Friends Life Group Limited was a Guernsey-incorporated investment vehicle which had the stated intent of forcing consolidation in the British life insurance industry. It was listed on the London Stock Exchange and was a constituent of the FTSE 100 Index. It was acquired by Aviva on 13 April 2015.

== History ==
The firm was founded as Resolution Limited by entrepreneur Clive Cowdery in 2008 after agreeing a deal to retain the naming rights to Resolution plc, the zombie fund investor he founded which was sold to Pearl Group that year.

The company was established with the intention of completing the leveraged buyout and merger of at least three UK life insurance operators by 2012 and spinning out the enlarged company on the stock market. The first of these, Friends Provident, was acquired in November 2009 for £1.86 billion. Upon completion of the deal Resolution, which obtained a listing on the London Stock Exchange in December 2008, took the place of Friends Provident in the FTSE 100 Index.

Resolution purchased Axa Sun Life Holdings Ltd from Axa SA in Autumn 2010. In October 2010 it bought Bupa Health Assurance.

In 2011 Resolution merged the UK operations of Friends Provident with the UK life assurance businesses acquired from Axa and Bupa under the name Friends Life.

Resolution changed its name to Friends Life Group in May 2014.

In December 2014, British insurer Aviva agreed terms for a £5.6 billion all-share takeover of Friends Life. Andy Briggs, current group chief executive of Friends Life, will become CEO of Aviva UK Life, with Mark Wilson continuing as CEO of the enlarged Aviva Group. The takeover was completed on 13 April 2015.

== Operations ==
Friends Life operated from seven countries around the world including: United Kingdom, Germany, Luxembourg, Dubai, Singapore, Hong Kong, and the Isle of Man. Friends Life was the 5th largest life and pensions company ranked by UK market capitalisation.

Friends Life were the title sponsors of the Friends Life t20 cricket league organised by the England and Wales Cricket Board, from 2010 to 2013 (as Friends Provident t20).

Senior management were employed by the London-headquartered limited liability partnership through which the company is effectively run.
