= AMP Life =

- Type: Subsidiary
- Industry: Financial services Life insurance
- Founded: 2018; 8 years ago
- Headquarters: Sydney, New South Wales, Australia
- Key people: Megan Beer (CEO), David Clarke, (Chair, Australia), Anne Blackburn (Chair, New Zealand)
- Products: Life insurance, superannuation, retirement plans
- Parent: Resolution Life Group Holdings

AMP Life is a superannuation, retirement investments and life insurance company based in Australia and New Zealand. It currently employs 1,000 people and manages $55 billion in funds for its 1.5 million customers. Its CEO is Megan Beer. The company was created by AMP Limited and is now owned by Resolution Life Australia, which in turn is part of the Bermuda-registered holding company, Resolution Life Group Holdings Ltd. AMP holds a 20% stake in the new company as the AMP leadership sees the ongoing relationship as being one of partnership. The AMP branding is expected to continue into the foreseeable future. The new business is being supported by AMP for a two-year period and all services commitments to customers remain unchanged.

== History ==
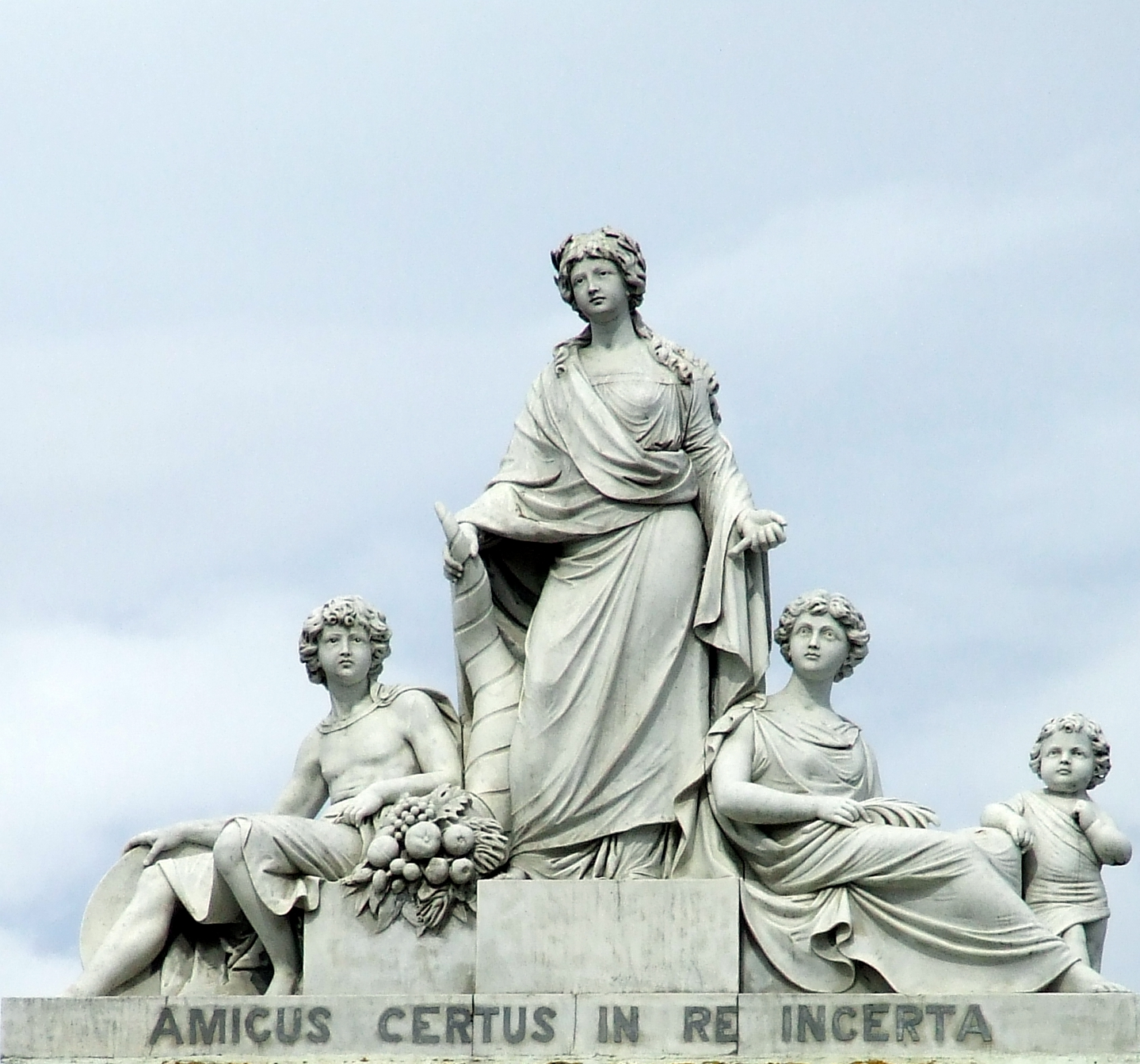
"A certain friend in uncertain times" was the founding motto of AMP, which was built on life insurance. This "Amicus" statue stands above the AMP building in Oamaru in New Zealand.

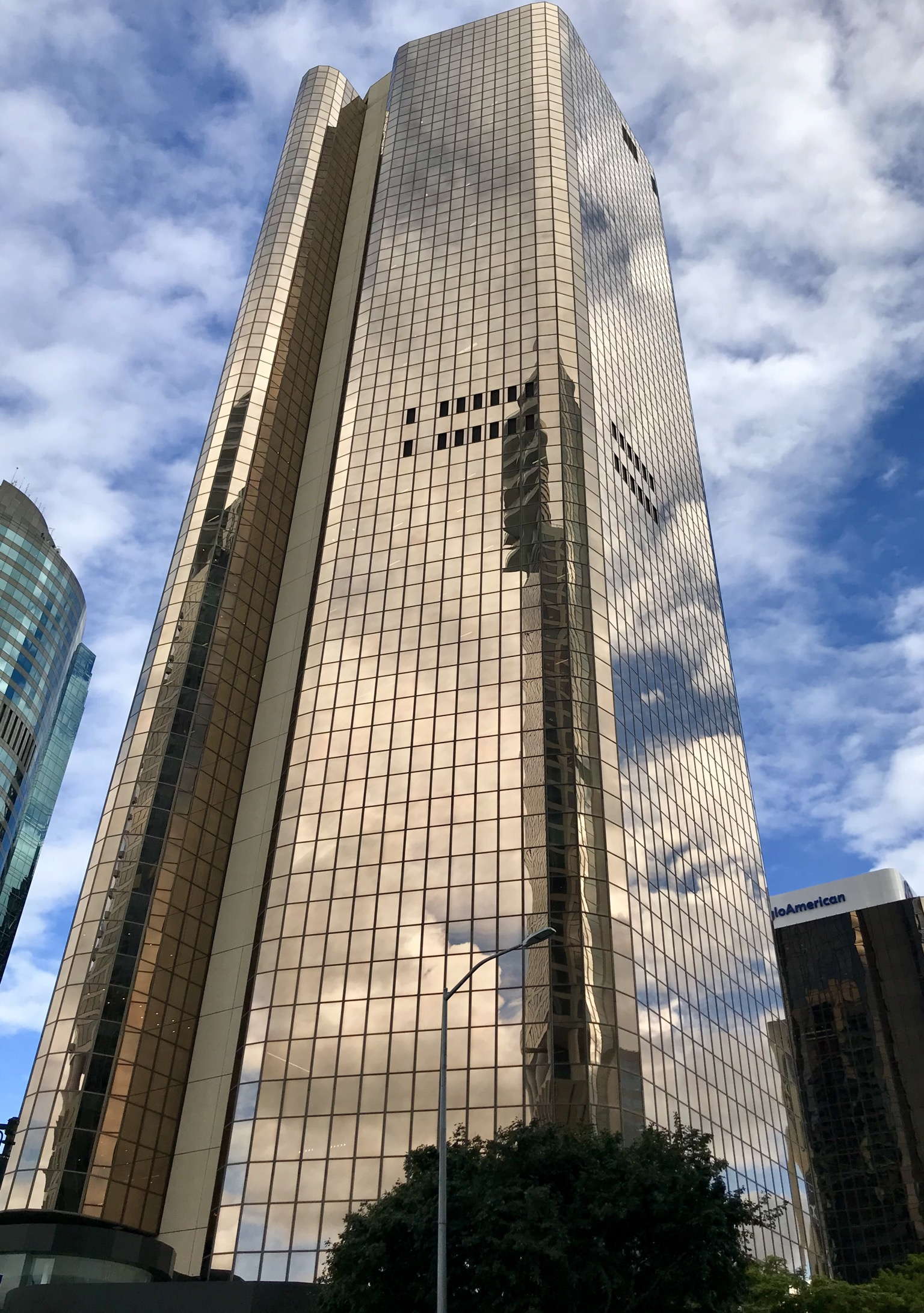
AMP Place, Brisbane at 10 Eagle Street, Brisbane, Queensland, Australia.

Life insurance was the very first financial product offered to customers by AMP in 1849. It remained a core business for the group until 2020. Notification of the sale of AMP Life to Resolution Life was announced to the market on 25 October 2018. The plan was briefly “derailed” when the New Zealand aspects of the deal were blocked by the Reserve Bank of New Zealand though this was later resolved. On 15 May 2020, the market was notified that AMP Life's retirement investments and life insurance products would now be under one trustee and super fund. All policies made with AMP have continued to be honoured, as have services to customers and advisers.
