= Max-Hervé George =

French businessman (born 1989)

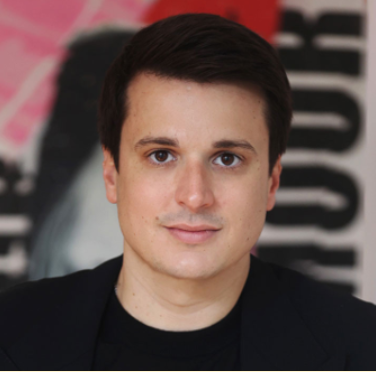
- Born: March 28, 1989 (age 37); Metz, France
- Occupation: Entrepreneur

Max-Hervé George (French: [maks ɛʁve ʒɔʁʒ]; born March 28, 1989) is a French billionaire businessman and entrepreneur, who is currently serving as Chairman and CEO of SWI Group, an alternative investment group with assets of US$11 billion, born from the merger of Icona Capital and Stoneweg. In February 2026, he completed the IPO of SWI Capital Holding, the parent holding company of SWI Group, on Euronext Amsterdam.

George began his professional career as a property developer; he co-founded Ultima Capital Group in 2012, which he exited through an IPO in 2019.

Originally from Metz (France), and after a period in Switzerland, George is now based in London, UK.

He is also known for managing a rare financial investment instrument life insurance contract "à cours connu", and for his associated long-running legal fight with insurer Aviva.

== Early life and education ==
George is the youngest in the family, born March 1989, and grew up in Metz, France with his brother and sister. From a very young age George showed great interest in economics and finance.

After completing his baccalauréat in economics at the Institut Pilâtre de Rozier in 2008, George went on to study law at University of Paris X. He left university in 2010 to focus on his first business ventures in real estate investments and private equity.

== Professional career ==
=== Ultima Capital ===
In 2012, he co-founded Ultima Capital with Byron Baciocchi, the company had assets valued at over $1 billion in value.

In the same year, the Ultima Group acquired Sport Hotel Rutti in Gstaad, a jet-set favourite ski resort in Switzerland. The property was demolished and rebuilt as Ultima Gstaad hotel, which opened in December 2016.

In August 2019, Ultima Capital SA listed on the BX Swiss stock exchange, with George remaining as CEO. In November 2023, George sold his stake in Ultima Capital to a Luxembourg investment group, with the enterprise value of the deal estimated at $1.4 billion.

=== Icona Capital ===
In 2019, Max-Hervé George founded Icona Capital, an investment firm where he serves as chairman.

In 2021, Max-Hervé George, through Icona Capital, acquired 20% of an independent Swiss private bank.

At the end of 2022, George led Icona Capital in taking control of Swiss investment manager Stoneweg, launching an €8 billion investment platform.

George purchased land, near Geneva, Switzerland and designed, developed and oversaw the construction to completion and launch of a commercial complex, which was sold in 2015. In 2015, George launched the Duchessa brand. The first boutique opened in Etoy in June 2016. Duchessa was sold to Geneva-based M3 Groupe in 2021.

He also led two large acquisitions in the real estate sector carried out in 2021: Liffey Park Technology Campus in Ireland acquired from Blackrock and a former bottling plant in Spain,which are two of the five data centers owned by SWI Group in 2025.

His company had two large acquisitions in the real estate sector: Liffey Park Technology Campus in Ireland acquired from Blackrock and a former bottling plant in Spain, which are the first two data centers owned by SWI Group.

In May 2024, under George's leadership, Icona Capital and Stoneweg announced the joint acquisition of the European operations of Cromwell Property Group, including its stake in CEREIT, a Singapore-listed Real Estate Investment Trust (REIT).

The transaction was completed in late 2024 for over US$300 million.

=== SWI Group ===
Following the acquisition of Cromwell Europe, it was announced in March 2025 that Icona Capital and Stoneweg were merging to form SWI Group, an Alternative Investment group, with US$11 billion of assets.

SWI Group was placed under the leadership of Max-Hervé George, who became Chairman and CEO upon the company’s creation.

=== Business profile ===
In 2019, George appeared on the Forbes 30 under 30 list and featured on the cover of Forbes.

In June 2020, George was described as one of the top prominent young entrepreneurs in Europe and has reportedly directly and indirectly participated in transactions in the billions of Euros and featured in the top 100 successful young people and the 300 richest by Swiss magazine Bilan. In July 2022, Max-Hervé George's personal fortune was estimated at €1.5 billion by the magazine Challenges.

George is a partner of the International Judo Federation (IJF). He was present at the 2020 Summer Olympics in Tokyo alongside Marius Vizer, President of the IJF, and he presented the medals in the Judo Men Heavyweight category. He was pictured with HSH Albert II and French President Emmanuel Macron.

== Aviva lawsuit ==
George and several of his family members are policyholders of a life insurance policy that allows for investments to be made at the previous week's price.

As of 2017, he has been fighting Aviva for 10 years, 15 if the years fought by his parents are taken into account.

By 2015, up to 50 court decisions had been rendered against Aviva France. In September 2014, the French Supreme court, the Cour de Cassation, ruled in favor of the George family, determining that the life insurance contracts, as drafted with the "known price" clause, are legally binding under French law. Nevertheless, George is still in court against Aviva, having won on the principle of the legality of the contracts, he now needs to have his prejudice recognized and valued in a second ongoing battle.

It is reported that at least 30 other people are in litigation with Aviva, with the possibility of thousands of similar contracts existing. Aviva has been repeatedly criticized for not disclosing the measure of the risks related to the "known price" contracts, "failing to show these potential losses on its books, it is also neglecting its duty to its shareholders and policyholders".

On 23 February 2021, Aviva sold its French business to Aema Group.
