= Standard Life plc =

British insurance company

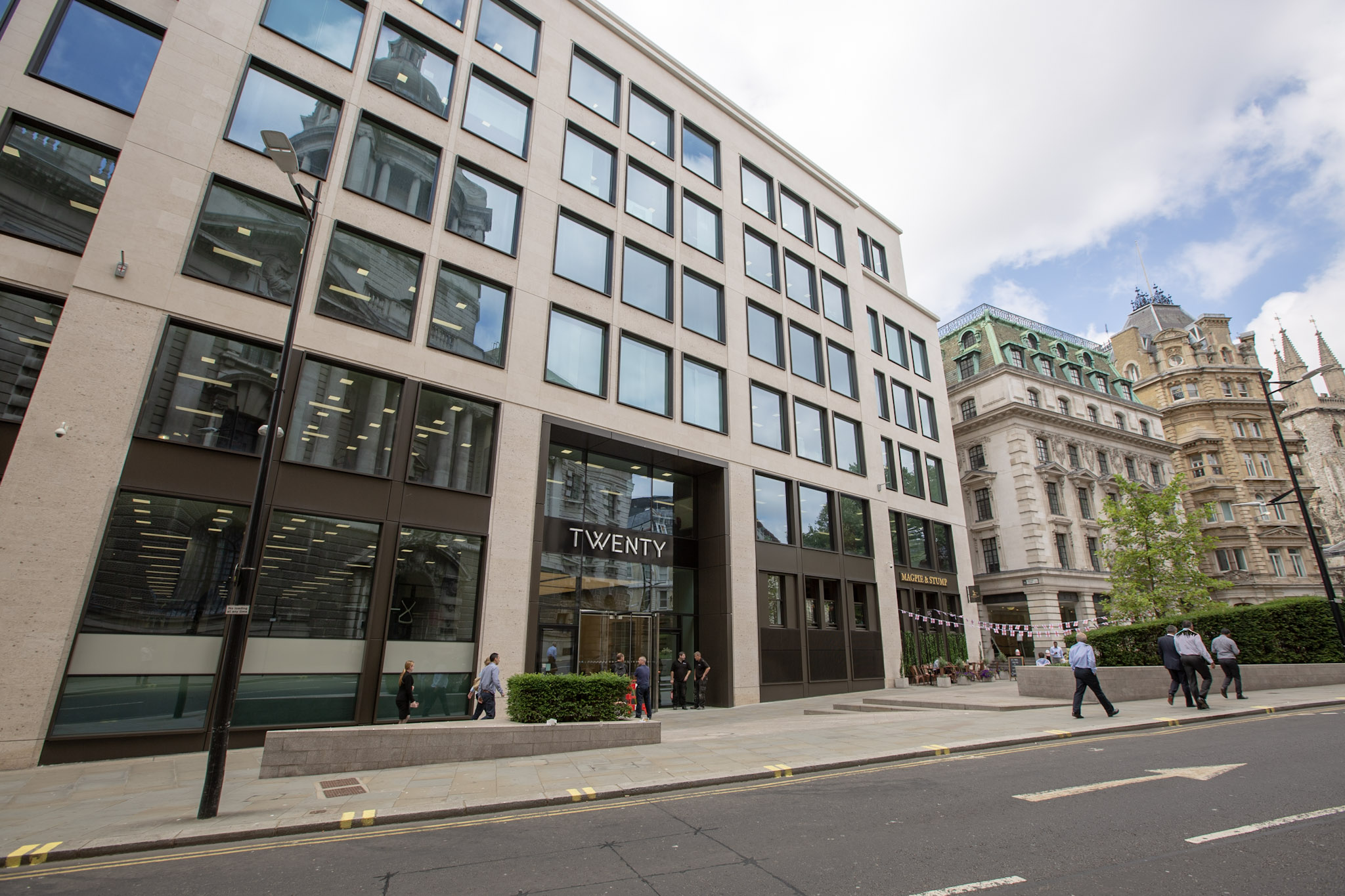
- Head office at 20 Old Bailey in London
- Type: Public
- Traded as: LSE: SDLF; FTSE 100 component
- Industry: Insurance
- Founded: 1857
- Headquarters: London, England, UK
- Area served: United Kingdom, Ireland, Germany
- Key people: Sir Nicholas Lyons (Chairman); Andy Briggs (Group Chief Executive)
- Revenue: ▲£5,512 million (2025)
- Operating income: ▲£286 million (2025)
- Net income: ▲£(394) million (2025)
- Number of employees: 6,600 (2026)
- Website: www.standardlifeplc.com

Standard Life plc, formerly Phoenix Group Holdings plc, is a provider of insurance services based in London, England. It is listed on the London Stock Exchange and is a constituent of the FTSE 100 Index.

== History ==
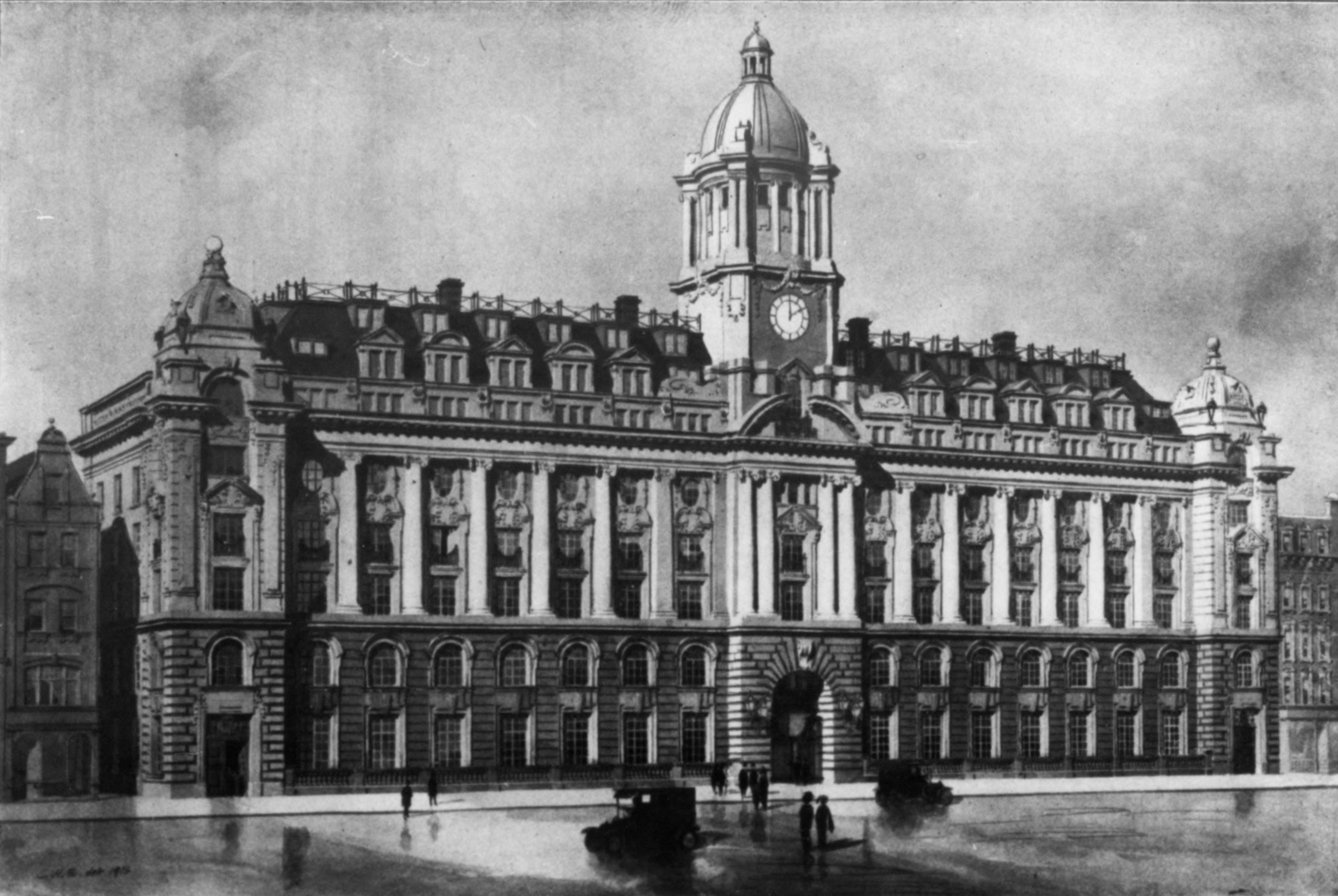
The Pearl Assurance head office, designed by Percy Monckton, on High Holborn in London (now the Rosewood London hotel)

The company was founded in 1857 as The Pearl Loan Company and operated from the Royal Oak public house opposite the Whitechapel Bell Foundry. It changed its name to The Pearl Assurance Company in 1914, when it moved to 252 High Holborn where it was based until moving its head office to Lynch Wood Park in Peterborough in 1989.

In 1990, it was acquired by the Australian insurance group, AMP, and in 2003, Pearl, NPI and London Life Association were demerged from AMP to become part of Henderson Group.

In 2005, the Pearl Group was bought from Henderson Group by Sun Capital Partners (a business in which Hugh Osmond is a leading partner) and TDR Capital. It acquired Resolution Life (including its Phoenix Assurance operations) in 2008. In 2009, the business was acquired by the Liberty Acquisition Holdings (International) Company (a vehicle controlled by billionaire Nicolas Berggruen), which subsequently renamed itself Pearl Group.

In 2010, Pearl Group rebranded as Phoenix Group Holdings. In March 2014, the business sold Ignis Asset Management to Standard Life Investments, the asset management arm of Standard Life.

In 2018, Phoenix Group agreed to acquire Standard Life Assurance from Standard Life Aberdeen for £2.9 billion. As part of the transaction Standard Life Aberdeen retained a stake in the combined group.

In 2020, Phoenix completed the acquisition of fellow closed book specialist ReAssure Group from Swiss Re.

In 2021, it was announced that Phoenix had acquired the rights to the Standard Life brand and had undertaken additional steps to simplify the relationship with Standard Life Aberdeen that had developed since the acquisition of the Standard Life business three years previously. The same year in July, Phoenix Group announced the acquisition of part of McKesson's European operations.

In 2025, the company announced that it would change its name from Phoenix Group Holdings plc to Standard Life plc in March 2026, thereby adopting the name of its most recognisable brand: the change took place on 2 March 2026.

In April 2026, Standard Life agreed to acquire the UK business of Aegon and its 3.7 million customers in a deal worth £2 billion. Standard Life will pay £750 million in cash as well as issuing shares to give Aegon 15.3% ownership of the group.

== Operations ==
Phoenix Group comprises a number of regulated life companies in the UK:

- Phoenix Life, a closed life insurance business covering Phoenix Life and Phoenix Life Assurance (former Pearl Assurance)
- Phoenix Wealth, the UK-based pensions and investments previously offered by AXA Wealth
- Standard Life
- ReAssure, covering ReAssure and ReAssure Life (formerly Old Mutual Wealth Life Assurance) and also including Ark Life
- SunLife
- SunLife of Canada UK
- Phoenix Corporate Investment Services

plus other unregulated businesses:

- Vebnet

== See also ==
- Pearl Assurance War Memorial
- Phoenix Fire Office
