= Rosewood London =

Luxury hotel in London, England

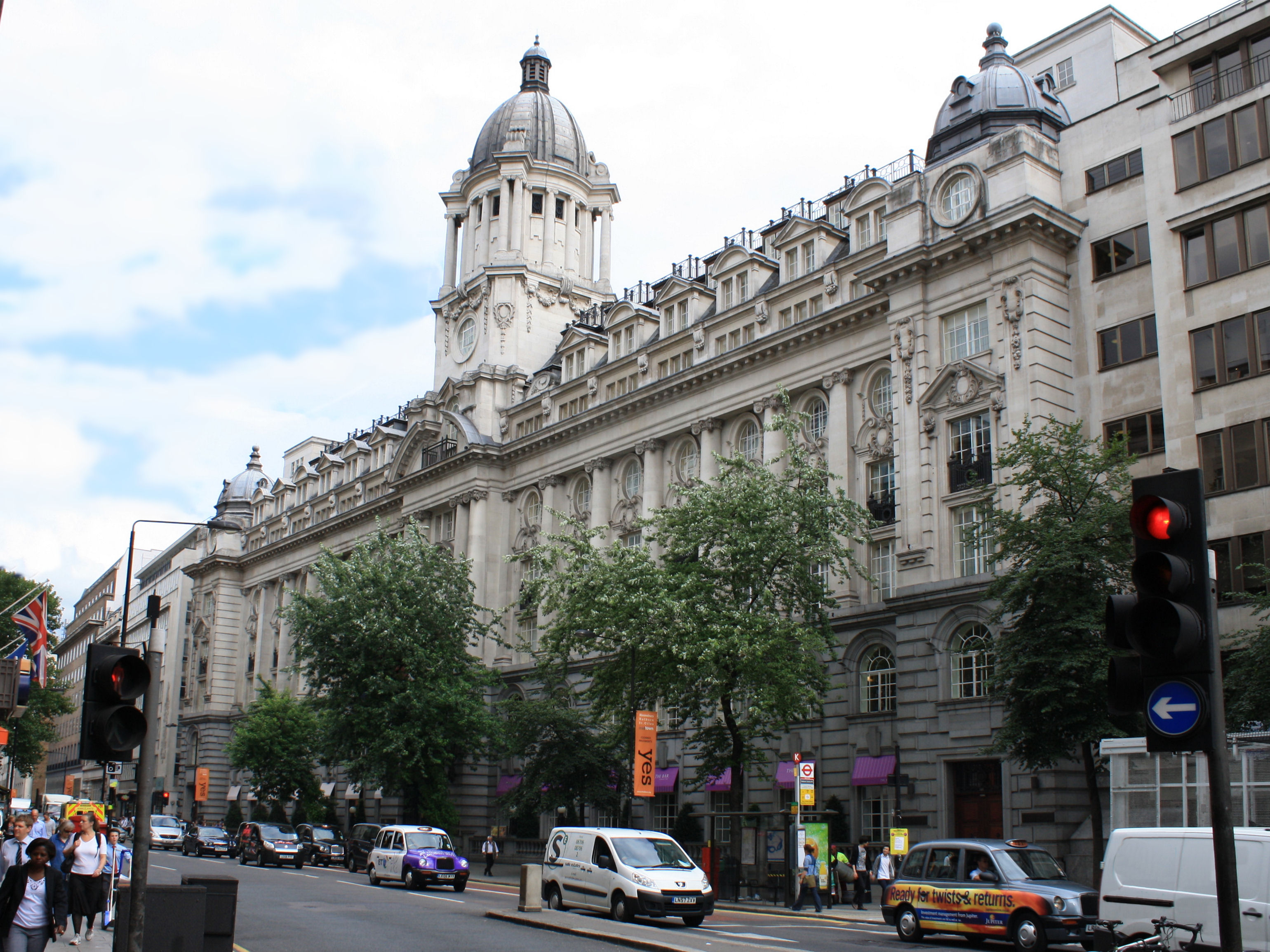

- Location within Central London

General information
- Location: 252 High Holborn, London, England, United Kingdom
- Coordinates: 51°31′02″N 0°7′04″W
- Opened: 2013
- Owner: Rosewood Hotel Group
- Operator: Rosewood Hotels & Resorts

Technical details
- Floor count: 7

Other information
- Number of rooms: 262
- Number of suites: 44
- Number of restaurants: 3
- Parking: 24 hour valet parking

Website
- rosewoodhotels.com/en/london

Rosewood London is a 5-star luxury hotel in London, England. It is located at 252 High Holborn in the Covent Garden neighbourhood of the West End. The hotel is part of the Rosewood Hotels & Resorts chain, which is currently based in Hong Kong.

== History ==
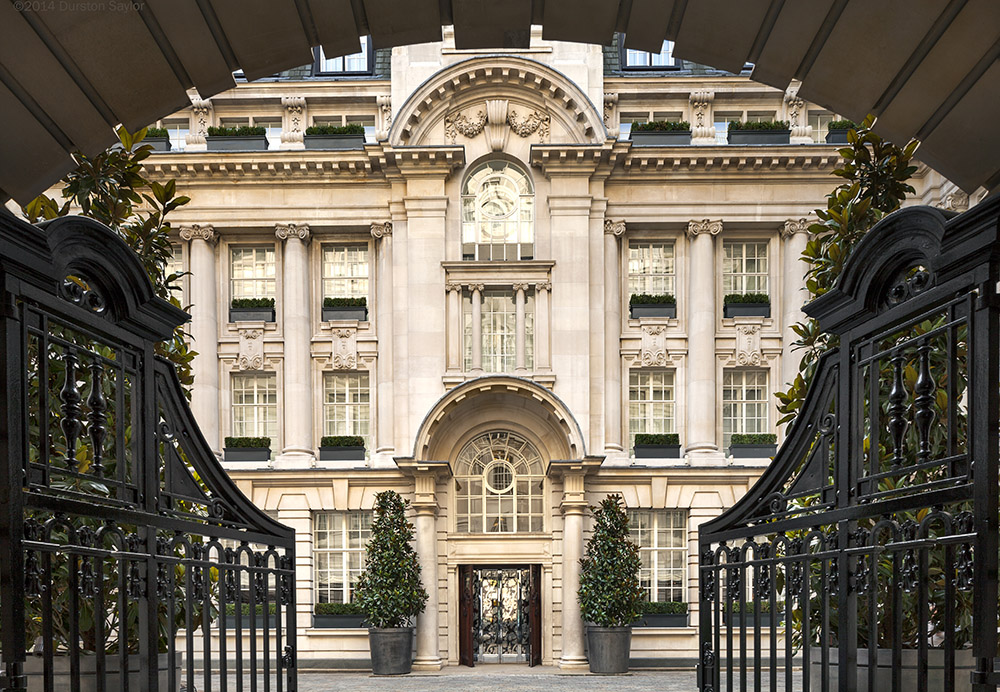
Guests arrive at Rosewood London through an archway that opens into a grand Edwardian courtyard.

The building comprises four blocks. The central block was designed by C. Newman and built between 1912 and 1919, while the east block (including Scarfes Bar, named for Gerald Scarfe) was designed by P. Moncton and built between 1929 and 1930. The south-east extension was designed by Bates & Sinning and built between 1954 and 1956, while the west block (including the Holborn Dining Room) was designed by Bates & Sinning and built between 1959 and 1960.

The property was formerly the headquarters of Pearl Assurance from 1914 to 1989. It is a Grade II listed building.

The hotel opened in 2000 and was managed by Marriott International under its Renaissance Hotels brand as the Renaissance Chancery Court. This relationship ended on 11 June 2011. The hotel then operated as the independent Chancery Court Hotel until closing in July 2013 for renovations. It reopened in October 2013 as the Rosewood London Hotel.

== In popular culture ==
The property was a filming location for The Politician's Wife (1995) and The Saint (1997). The hotel's previous fine-dining restaurant, Pearl, played host to the finale of Masterchef: The Professionals (2010).

The 1883 segment of the 2005 Doctor Who online adventure game, "Attack of the Graske", takes place on High Holborn in front of the address at which the hotel would later be constructed.
