= Zombie fund =

With-profits life insurance fund that is closed to new business

A zombie fund (more formally known as a closed fund) is a colloquial expression for a with-profits life insurance fund that is closed to new business. It is therefore running off its portfolio of insurance liabilities, but not issuing new policies, until the final policy matures, which may be many years into the future.

In some cases, closed funds will at some point merge with other life insurance funds, or be transferred to another company, in order to achieve economies of scale.

Closed funds can attract negative coverage, as in the case of Resolution plc.

The term might also refer to an investment fund, typically a private equity fund or a hedge fund, that continues to exist but no longer actively manages investments or generates meaningful returns for its investors.
