= Friends Provident =

British life insurance company

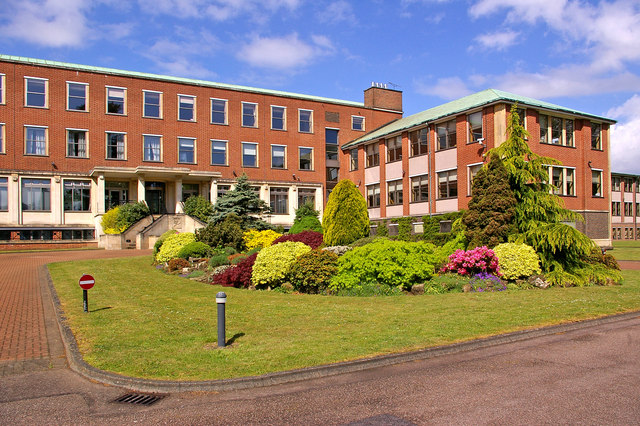
- Head office in Dorking
- Type: Subsidiary
- Industry: Financial services
- Founded: 1832; 194 years ago
- Headquarters: London, England, UK
- Key people: Trevor Matthews (Group Chief Executive)
- Products: Insurance, inheritance tax products, investment management pensions
- Revenue: £949 million (2008)
- Operating income: £(871) million (2008)
- Net income: £(666) million (2008)
- Owner: Resolution
- Number of employees: Around 6,000 worldwide

Friends' Provident Insurance was a banking institution founded in 1832 to serve the needs of the Society of Friends (Quakers). Based in Bradford, Yorkshire, it concentrated on sickness and annuity policies until its life fund acquired Century Insurance in 1918, expanding into general insurance. The restriction to Quaker membership was an increasing constraint but the ties were substantially reduced by the Friends' Provident Institution Act 1915 (5 & 6 Geo. 5. c. xlv). Although Century's branch network enabled FPI to expand, the periodic underwriting losses strained the life fund's capital base and Century was sold in 1975. In the year 2000, Friends Provident demutualised and listed on the FT100 Index. After abortive takeover negotiations, Friends accepted a takeover bid from Resolution Limited in 2009.

== History ==
=== The early years ===
Samuel Tuke and Joseph Rowntree first mooted the ideal of a friendly society in 1829, to serve the needs of the Society of Friends (Quakers). Tuke, who was a prominent leader in the Society and a city councillor in York, took the lead and was the insurer's first chairman. No capital was initially subscribed; "solvency was guaranteed by a bond entered into by several trustees" chiefly of noted Quaker families. Funds were subsequently raised from 45 prominent Quakers and, with a board of 20 directors, Friends' Provident Insurance [FPI] was launched in 1832. There was only one member of staff, Benjamin Ecroyd the Secretary, a conveyancer in Bradford, and the FPI opened in a room above a confectioner's shop in Market Street Bradford. The office remained until 1862 when the FPI bought the old county court building at Darley Street.

Friends' Provident Institution Act 1899
- Act of Parliament
- Parliament of the United Kingdom
- Long title: An Act for enabling the Friends' Provident Institution to sue and be sued in the name of a Public Officer for more effectually vesting in their Trustees for the time being the Funds and Property of the Institution for conferring further powers on the Institution as to the Investment of their Funds and for other purposes.
- Citation: 62 & 63 Vict. c. lv

Dates
- Royal assent: 13 July 1899

Other legislation
- Repealed by: Friends' Provident Life Office Act 1975

Status: Repealed

Text of statute as originally enacted

Friends' Provident Institution Act 1915
- Act of Parliament
- Parliament of the United Kingdom
- Long title: An Act to incorporate the Friends' Provident Institution and to provide for the management of its affairs and for other purposes.
- Citation: 5 & 6 Geo. 5. c. xlv

Dates
- Royal assent: 2 July 1915

Other legislation
- Repealed by: Friends' Provident Life Office Act 1975

Status: Repealed

Text of statute as originally enacted

The first classes of business were annuities for members aged over 55 and children's deferred policies. After its initial ten years, when life funds had reached £150,000, FPI was able to declare its first bonuses on life policies. Agencies were gradually appointed, all through the offices of the Society of Friends and by 1862 there were 42 in England, one each in Wales and Scotland, and eight in Ireland. Life funds increased progressively to £1m. in 1870, £2m. in 1889, and £3m. in 1902. As FPI grew in size it, increasingly found itself constrained by the Friendly Society Acts and especially its confinement to members of the Society of Friends. By the 1890s this was regarded as serious impediment to growth The restriction on investment powers was resolved by the Friends' Provident Institution Act 1899 (62 & 63 Vict. c. lv) but the Quaker constraints took longer to resolve. There was little scope to increase agents as these were tied to Quaker meetings and had been fully exploited; there were no branches except London. Poor results in 1908 and 1909 led to a search for solutions and there were abortive negotiations for Royal Exchange Assurance to take over FPI in 1912. In 1914, FPI agreed to accept non-Quakers for non-profit policies only but the major change came with the Friends' Provident Institution Act 1915 (5 & 6 Geo. 5. c. xlv). This incorporated FPI as a mutual life assurance office free from the remaining restrictions of the Friendly Society Acts and accepting all the provisions of the Companies Act. It was no longer necessary to appoint trustees to hold property or exercise other legal functions. Under new rules membership still primarily required membership of, or association with. the Society of Friends; however, the directors were given power to admit any appropriate person. The directors now recognised that new leadership was required if FPI was to expand and in 1916 Henry Tapscott, the branch manager of Royal Exchange at Birmingham was appointed the first general manager; as a sign of the changes underway, he was not a Quaker.

=== The Century acquisition ===
A central part of Tapscott's strategy was to move FPI into general insurance but there were no powers to do so under the Friends' Provident Institution Act 1915. However, there was nothing to prevent it investing in a company and in 1918 FPI's life fund bought the Century Insurance Company of Edinburgh at a cost of £507,000, 15 per cent of the life fund's assets. Century was founded in 1885, as Sickness and Accident Assurance but as the general insurance business expanded it changed its name to Century Insurance Co. in 1901. Unlike FPI, Century had well-established branches with five in Scotland, 13 in England, one in Wales and two in Ireland and these were intended to be the vehicle for FPI's expansion. Century had also developed significant overseas interests. By 1914, agencies had been opened in eight European countries, two in Australia and three in India. A shred underwriting agreement had also been made with Henry W Brown, which operated in most states of the United States.

Following the Century acquisition, the FPI head office was moved from Bradford to Kingsway, London; the head office of Century remained in Edinburgh but its general insurance business was moved to London. The Century agents were used to expand FPI's life business. In recognition of the changes, in 1920 the name of the company was changed to Friends' Provident and Century Life Office although legally Century remained owned by the FPI life fund. Apart from losses in marine insurance, the combined business made good progress. Through Century, the Pacific Coast Fire Company of Canada was also bought in 1920 and there was a further significant increase in the fire business when in 1926 it bought Liverpool Marine & General Insurance. The growth in business required larger premises and in 1928 a new office at 7 Leadenhall Street was bought. However, the expansion of Century's business, particularly in North America was causing strains that would eventually lead to its disposal.

By the late 1920s, the growth in Century's business was requiring an equivalent increase in capital and this put a strain on the resources of the FPI life fund. A new holding company, Century Insurance Trust, was formed to hold all the general insurance companies and this was able to raise its own loan capital. Worse was to come in the form of the Wall Street crash of 1929 and the subsequent depression. The Group was more heavily invested in U.S. and Canadian stocks than most life companies and those investments fell by more than 50 per cent. More than 60 per cent of Century's general insurance business was written in the U.S. and Canada; its premium income fell by 25 per cent over the two years 1929 and 1930 and underwriting results were also poor. By the end of 1930, FPI 's life fund assets were valued at five per cent less than its liabilities. FPI even cancelled its planned centenary bonus. Substantial cost reductions and better fund revaluations allowed the life business to grow. Friends Provident began writing pensions business in 1934 and this became large enough to form a group life and pensions department in 1937. By the end of the 1930s, life premium income was double that of 1929.

=== The End of Century ===
Post-war growth was encouraging, prompting a further move of head office. In 1954, Friends' Provident bought 43 acres outside Dorking in 1954 and a new headquarters was opened in 1958. However, the position in North America began to worsen. US and Canada made losses in fire and motor between 1951 and 1957 and Century made heavy trading losses in 1957, once again impacting on the value of the life fund. In 1963 Century withdrew entirely from the US fire and accident market and consolidated its position in Canada. Century suffered fire losses in 1973and 1974 and recognised that in accident and marine it was hard to match the expense ratios of the larger companies. At the same time, the need for increased solvency and regulatory changes had reduced the life fund's value of Century to less than half its written down value. It was agreed that on 1 January 1975, Phoenix Insurance would buy all of Century Insurance worldwide for shares in the enlarged group. The official announcement stated that "This agreement is in the best interest of both companies with the advantages of a greater volume, well distributed"

=== A Life Office once again ===
Friends' Provident Life Office Act 1975
- Act of Parliament
- Parliament of the United Kingdom
- Long title: An Act to provide for the control and management of the Friends' Provident Life Office; and for other purposes.
- Citation: 1975 c. xiv

Dates
- Royal assent: 3 July 1975

Other legislation
- Repeals/revokes: Friends' Provident Institution Act 1899; Friends' Provident Institution Act 1915

Status: Current legislation

Text of statute as originally enacted

The company; now known as Friends' Provident Life, was once again a life-only mutual company. Despite the problems of Century, it been expanding. In 1957 it had entered the life market in Canada by buying 90 per cent of Fidelity Life Assurance of Regina, Saskatchewan and in 1960 it opened a life branch in Australia. By the 1970s it had been agreed that the life business and the general business of Century should not be operated out of the same office and a separate branch structure was established for the life office. The sale of Century was followed by the passing of the Friends' Provident Life Office Act 1975 (c. xiv) to update the rules, ending the requirement that a majority of the directors had to be Quakers. The new rules allowed for at least five out of a board of ten to twenty directors to be Quakers. That year also saw Phoenix sell its Australian life business to Friends' Provident. By 1981, a league table of British life offices listed Friends' Provident as fifteenth by assets.

In 1986 Friends merged with UK Provident. In 1992 it became a foundation partner in the Eureko Alliance in association with AVCB (The Netherlands), Topdanmark (Denmark) and Wasa (Sweden). As part of this alliance, Friends Provident passed all of its then non UK subsidiaries (primarily in Australia, Canada and Ireland) into Eureko. The Irish entity continued on the Friend's Provident brand for a number of years until ultimately renaming as Friends' First in 1998.

In 1993 it acquired the UK operations of National Mutual of Australia and in 1998 it acquired London & Manchester Assurance.

In November 1997, Friends Provident announced that it would merge its asset management business with Ivory and Sime, in a deal worth £132 million, thereby creating Friends Ivory & Sime. Following the transaction, Friends Provident owned 67% of the combined entity.

=== Demutualisation and the Resolution acquisition ===
In the year 2000, Friends Provident demutualised and listed on the FT100 Index, raising £1.6m. Its two main businesses were life and pensions, and asset management through its 67% holding in Friends Ivory and Sime. As part of the demutualisation the Friends Provident Foundation was endowed as an independent charity. The asset management was enlarged by the purchase of Royal Sun & Alliance's asset business and then again in 2004 by the merger with F&C Asset Management. This left Friends Provident with 51% of the enlarged F & C, managing £125 billion funds. In July 2007, Friends announced an agreed "merger of equals" with insurer Resolution plc but this collapsed in November as a result of shareholder opposition. This prompted a strategic review, including cost cutting and a proposed demerger of F & C. In January 2008 Friends received an informal £4.1 billion offer by JC Flowers, later aborted. In 2009 a newly formed Resolution Limited returned with a fresh approach and in August a bid of £1.86 billion was accepted. In the November, Friends Provident duly became a subsidiary of Resolution.

== Operations ==
The UK Life and Pensions business marketed a range of life protection, income protection, pensions and investment products for individual customers and corporate clients throughout the UK.

The International Life and Pensions business operated throughout Europe, Asia, and the Middle East.

== Ethical stance ==
Friends Provident was the first investment house in the UK to offer a fully ethical investment fund called the Stewardship fund.

== Members of the Friends Provident Group ==
- Friends Provident Life and Pension Limited – Provides life, pension and investment services within the UK
- Friends Provident Life Assurance Limited – Provides life and investment services worldwide under English and Guernsey law.
- Friends Provident International Limited – Formerly Royal and Sun Alliance International but was taken over in 2003. Provides life and investment services worldwide and operates under the law of the Isle of Man.

== Offices ==
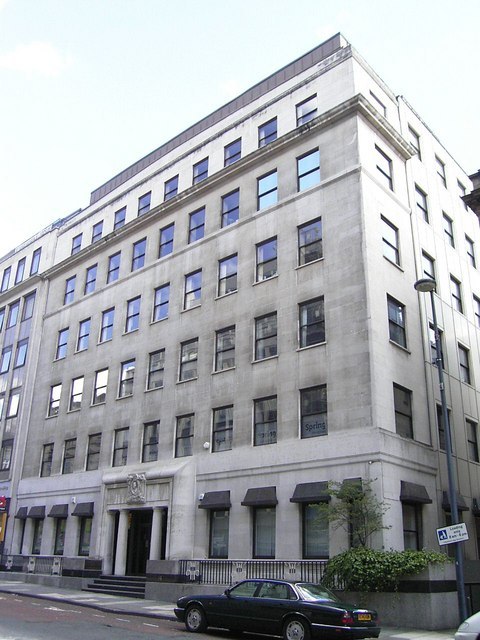
The Friends Provident building on South Parade in Leeds.

Friends Provident had large offices in a number of locations including Manchester, Clyst St. Mary in Exeter and Dorking, and Salisbury.

== Sports sponsorships ==
In 2009 the England and Wales Cricket Board (ECB) announced that Friends Provident would be the title sponsor for the new Twenty20 competition, the Friends Provident T20.

In 2007 Friends Provident signed a three-year deal to sponsor the domestic one-day cricket competition, The Friends Provident Trophy.

Friends Provident were the main sponsor of Southampton F.C. from 1999 to 2006 and also sponsored the St Mary's Stadium, from its construction in 2001 until 2006. During this time, the venue was officially known as the Friends Provident St. Mary's Stadium.
