= Resolution plc =

UK insurance company

Resolution
- Industry: Insurance, Pensions, Life Assurance
- Founded: 2004
- Defunct: May 2008
- Fate: Acquired by Pearl Group
- Headquarters: London, England, UK
- Key people: Clive Cowdery, Chairman; Andy Briggs, CEO
- Revenue: £5,152.2 million (2006)
- Operating income: £482.3 million (2006)
- Net income: £531.3 million (2006)
- Number of employees: 40 (2009)

Resolution plc was a UK insurance company headquartered in the City of London. It was listed on the London Stock Exchange and was once a constituent of the FTSE 100 Index but was acquired by the Pearl Group in May 2008.

== History ==
=== Early history ===
The Resolution Life group was formed in 2004 to provide a vehicle for life funds that have been closed to new business, but have liabilities extending many years into the future.

The first purchase was the life insurance business of Royal & SunAlliance, followed by the purchase of Swiss Life's UK business.

In September 2005, Resolution Life secured a listing on the London Stock Exchange by merging with Britannic Group.

In 2006, the merged group bought the life business of Abbey National, a transaction of £3.6 billion that brought entry into the FTSE 100.

On 30 May 2007 Resolution announced a strategic partnership with Capita which will result in the transfer of approximately two thousand staff in Customer Services and IT and phased outsourcing of back-office customer services to India.

=== Takeover by Pearl Group ===
On 25 July 2007 Resolution agreed a merger with Friends Provident to create a new entity, Friends Financial, with a market cap of circa £8.6Bn, however by September 2007 it was announced that Hugh Osmond's Pearl Group, a critic of the proposed merger with Friends Provident, had undergone talks with Swiss Re about a potential deal to take over Resolution, but talks broke down. On 10 October 2007, Pearl made a formal offer of 660 pence per share, worth approximately £4.5 billion, in conjunction with the Royal London Mutual Insurance Society. Standard Life and Swiss Re also entered the bidding for Resolution, and for a brief period on 26 October 2007 their cash and shares bid, worth £4.9 billion was recommended by the board, which called off any deal with Friends Provident. Within a short space of time, Pearl came back with an all-cash offer of 720 pence per share. In addition, Hugh Osmond, chief executive of Pearl, now controlled a stake of 24.1% of Resolution's ordinary shares, which would have effectively blocked any planned merger from Standard Life as it would have required 75% approval from shareholders. In mid-November 2007, Standard Life pulled out of the merger and the offer from Pearl was recommended by the board to shareholders.

At the extraordinary general meeting, held on 8 January 2008, the shareholders overwhelmingly agreed to the merger. Having been approved by the Financial Services Authority in mid-April 2008, the acquisition was completed on 1 May 2008. The Scottish Provident and Scottish Provident International brands and various in-force blocks of policies were taken over by the Royal London Group, with the rest going to Pearl. At this time, Pearl agreed to allow Clive Cowdery to use the Resolution brand.

=== Relaunch as an investment vehicle ===
Resolution was relaunched by Clive Cowdery as an investment acquisition vehicle in December 2008. Resolution Life Group Holdings Ltd, which is registered in Bermuda, is the holding company for several global insurance brands, including AMP Life. In 2019, investors in the holding company included JPMorgan Chase, KKR, Nippon Life Insurance Company, Temasek Holdings and a Middle Eastern sovereign wealth fund.

The group resumed talks with Friends Provident in July 2009 but was rejected twice, though Friends Provident eventually agreed to a takeover in August 2009.

== Operations ==
Brands owned by the group included:

- Swiss Life (UK)
- Phoenix Assurance
- Bradford Insurance Company
- Royal & Sun Alliance Linked Insurances
- Alba Life, previously:
  - Britannia Life
  - FS Assurance
  - Crusader Insurance
  - Life Association of Scotland
  - Foreman and Staff Mutual Benefit Society
- Britannic Asset Management (previously Britannia Asset Management, now Resolution Asset Management)
- Britannic Assurance
- Britannic Retirement Solutions
- Britannic Unit Linked Assurance
- Century Group
- Century Life
- Phoenix Life & Pensions
- Allianz Cornhill (life operations)
- AMP Life
