= Trail =

Path for mostly non-motorized travel through a natural area

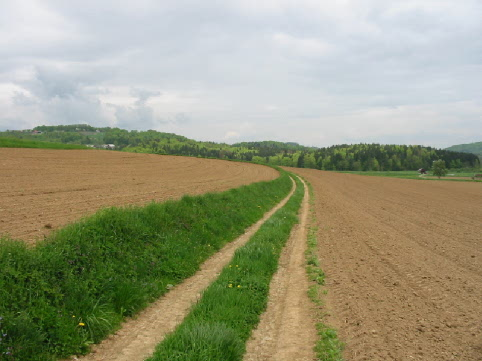
A country track, or fieldway, in Slovenia

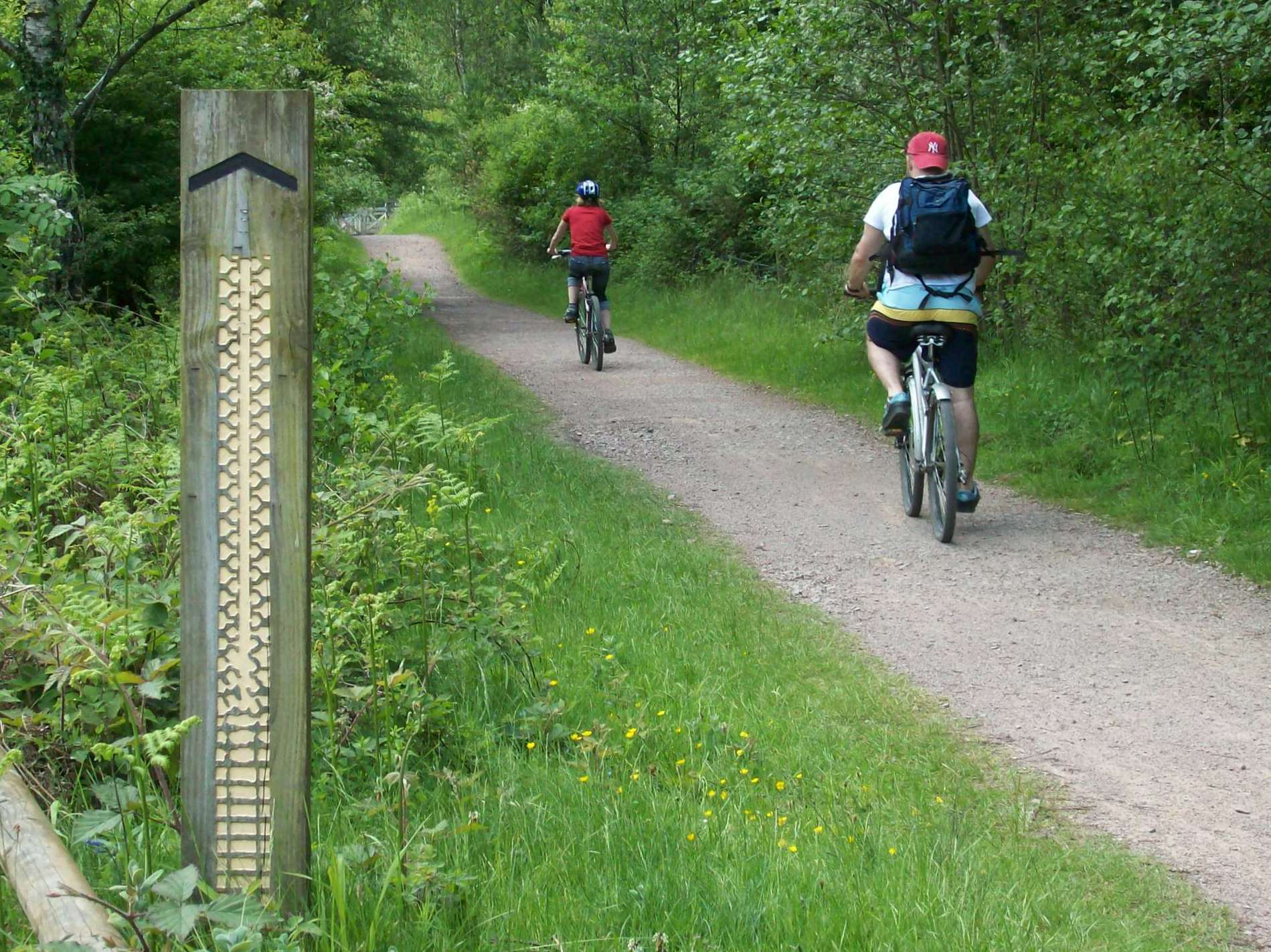
Mountain bike trail in the Forest of Dean, England

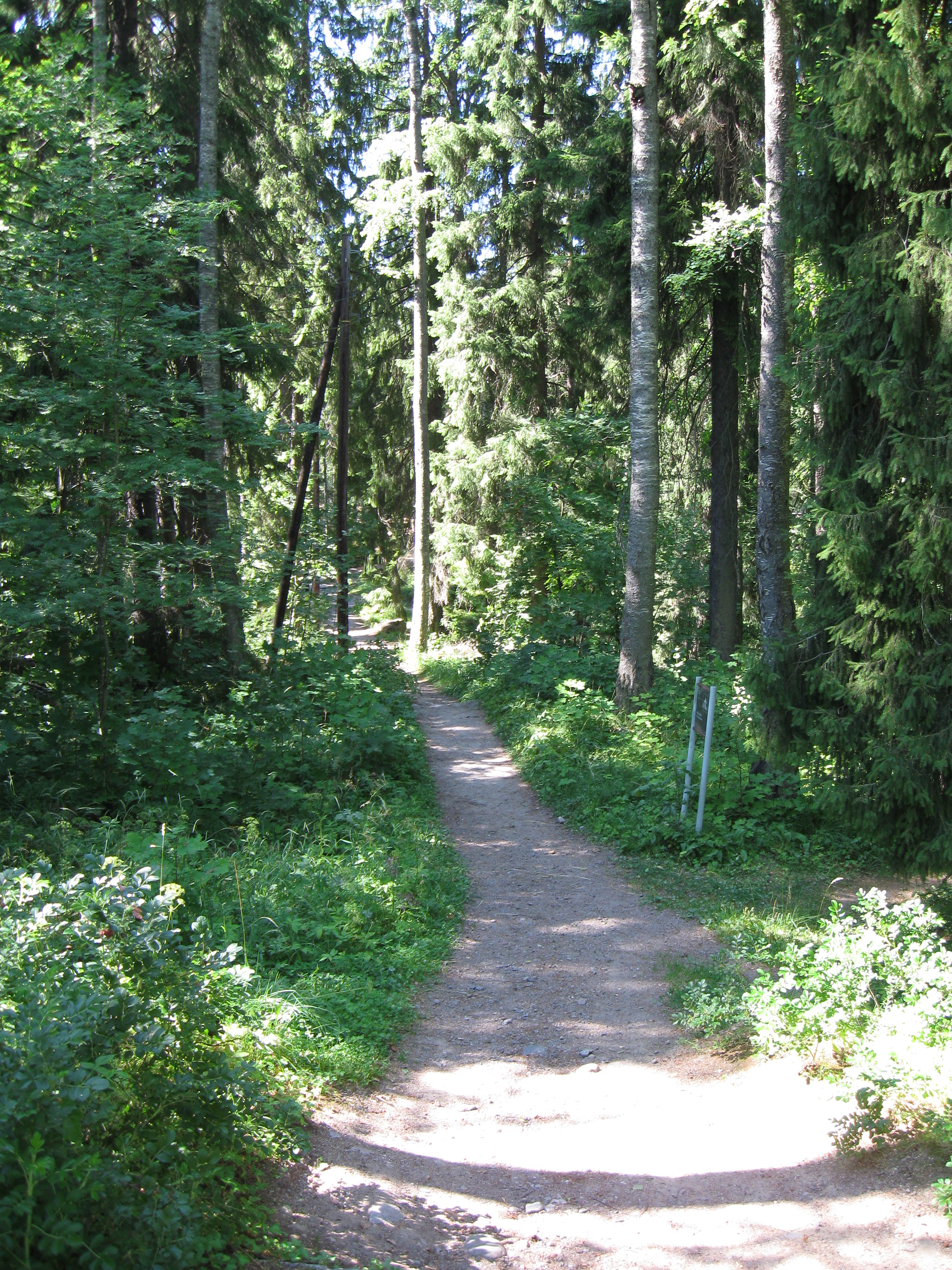
Trail in the Kruununpuisto Nature Park in Imatra, Finland

A trail, also known as a path or track, is a dirt road or a small paved road, usually through an undeveloped natural area, that is designed primarily for use by pedestrians, equestrians and non-motorized vehicles, although occasionally some off-roading motor vehicles may also use it. In the United Kingdom and Ireland, footpath or hiking trail is the preferred term. However, it is sometimes applied to highways in North America. In the United States, the term was historically used to describe the westward expansion trails (e.g. the Oregon Trail), which are land routes into or through wildness regions of the American West used by explorers and migrants.

Some trails are restricted to use by only walkers, cyclists or equestrians, or for cattle driving, snowshoeing or cross-country skiing, while others (e.g. bridleways in the UK) are shared-use and can be used by walkers, cyclists and equestrians. Although most trail ban use by motorized vehicles, there are unpaved trails that allow dirt bikes, quad bikes and other off-road vehicles, usually for extreme sports and rally races. In some mountainous regions like the Alps, trails are used by alpine agrarian communities for moving livestock between grazing pastures.

== Usage ==
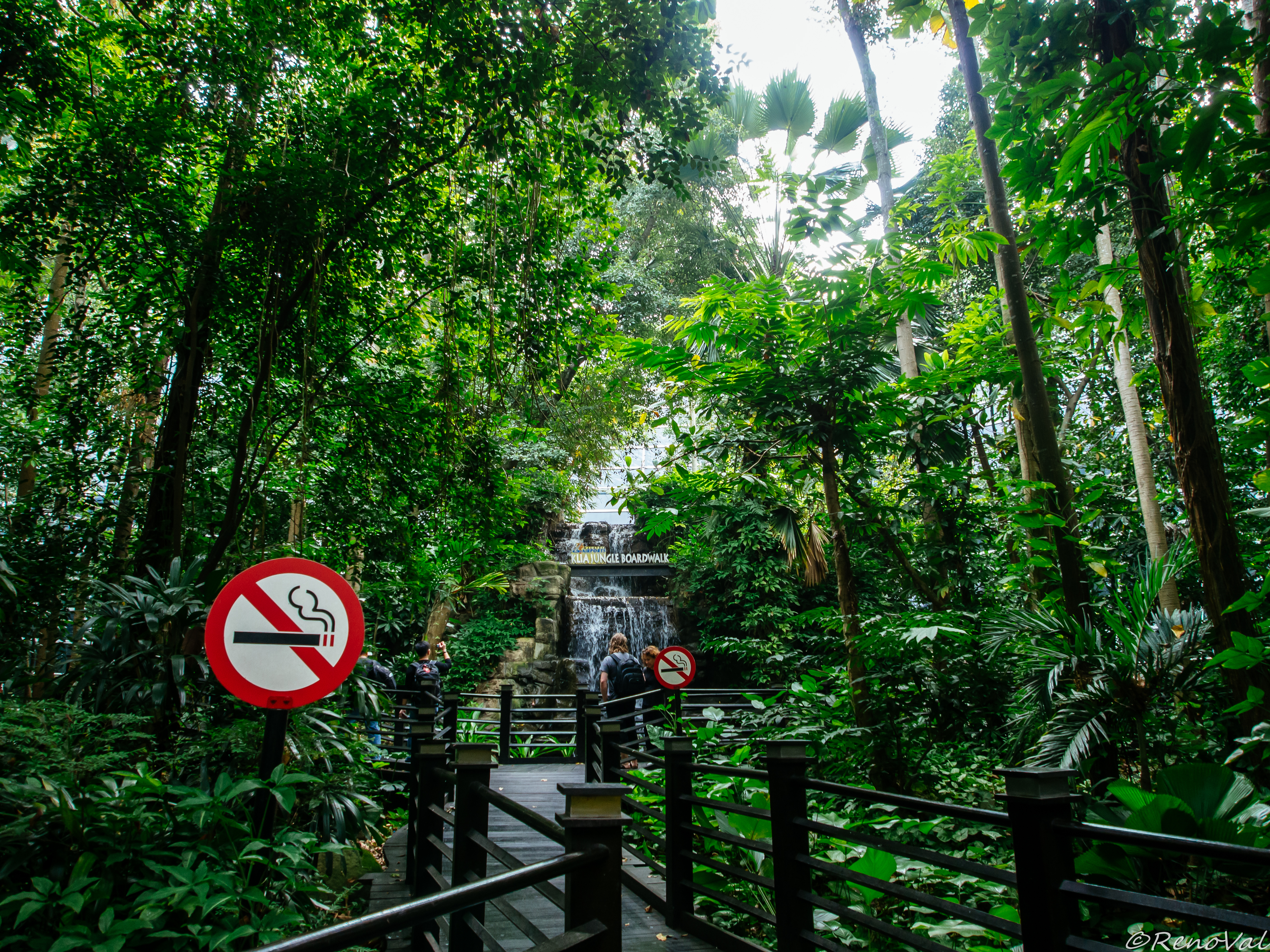
Jungle trail inside KLIA Airport

In Australia, the term "track" can be used interchangeably with trail or walk, and can refer to anything from an improvized trial to an lightly paved footpath or walkway.

In New Zealand, the terms "track" or "walkway" are used almost exclusively except when referring to cross-country skiing: "walkways vary enormously in nature, from short urban strolls, to moderate coastal locations, to challenging tramps [hikes] in the high country [mountains]". Walkway is used similarly in St. John's, Newfoundland, Canada, where the "Grand Concourse", is an integrated walkway system.

In the United Kingdom, the term "trail" is in common usage. Longer distance walking routes, and government-promoted long-distance paths, collectively known as National Trails, are also frequently called ways as in the Pennine Way and South Downs Way. Generally, the term footpath is preferred for pedestrian routes, including long-distance trails, and is used for urban paths and sometimes in place of pavement. Track is used for wider paths (wide enough for vehicles), often used for hiking. The terms bridleway, byway, restricted byway are all recognised legal terms and to a greater or lesser extent in general usage.

The increased popularity of mountain biking has led to a proliferation of mountain bike trails in many countries. Often these will be grouped to form larger complexes, known as trail centers.

In the early years of the 20th century, the term auto trail was used for a marked highway route, and trail is now used to designate routes, including highway routes, designated for tourist interest like the Cabot Trail, Nova Scotia, Canada and the Quilt Trails in the US. The term trail has been used by developers and urban planners for a variety of modern paved roads, highways, and boulevards, in these countries, and some highways continue to be officially called a trail, such as the Susquehanna Trail in Pennsylvania, a designation that varies from a two-lane road to a four-lane freeway. An unusual use of the term is in the Canadian province of Alberta, which has multi-lane freeways called trails.

== History ==
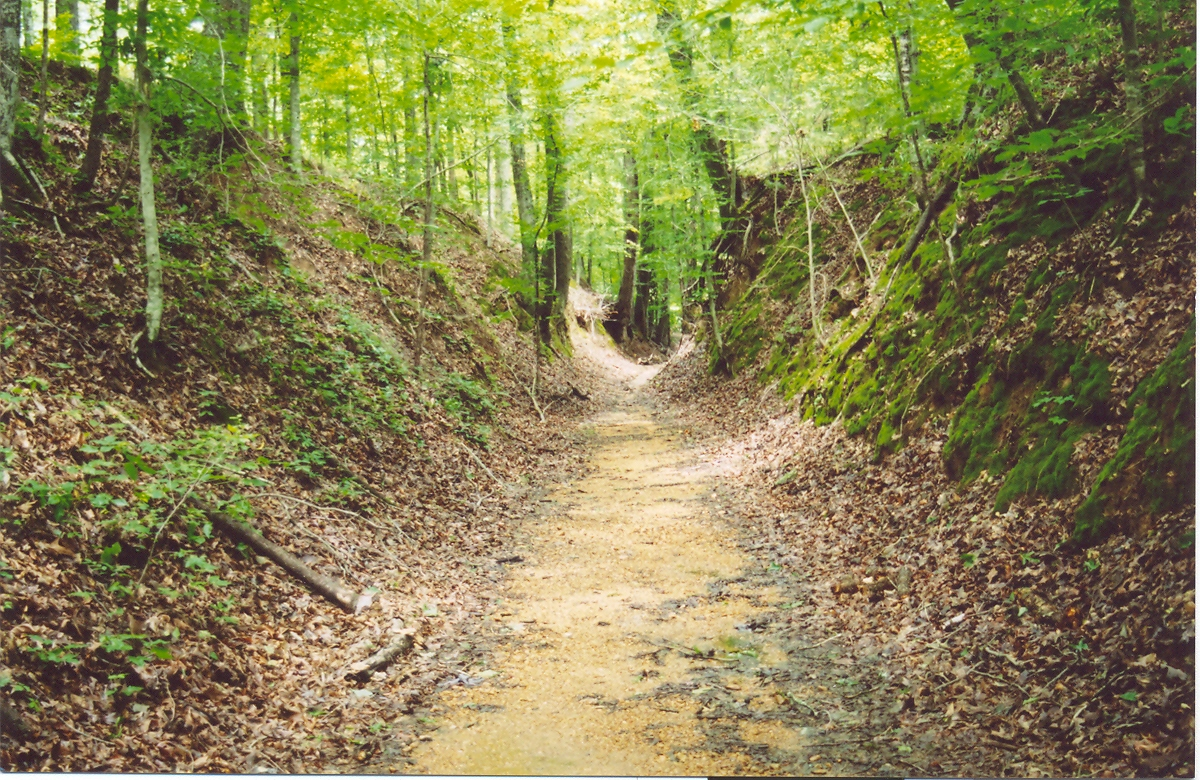
The Natchez Trace is a trail, that was created and used by Native Americans in the United States for centuries, and was later used by early European and Americans.

Animals created the first trails, which were "later adapted by humans". Subsequently, farmers moved cattle to market along drove roads and between winter and summer grazing creating trails. More recently, former industrial routes, such as railway rights of way and canal towpaths, have been turned into recreational trails.

Many historic routes, like the Silk Road, the Amber Road and the Royal Road of the Persian Empire, existed before the Christian era and covered great distances.

The Post Track, a prehistoric causeway in the valley of the River Brue in the Somerset Levels, England, is one of the oldest known constructed trackways and dates from around 3838 BC.

The idea of following a path or track for exercise or pleasure developed during the 18th century in Europe and arose because of changing attitudes to the landscape and nature associated with the Romantic movement. In earlier times, walking generally indicated poverty and was associated with vagrancy. In previous centuries long walks were undertaken as part of religious pilgrimages and this tradition continues throughout the world.

The first footpath built specifically for recreational hiking in America, and likely the world, is the Crawford Path in the White Mountains of New Hampshire. The path was blazed in 1819 by Abel Crawford and his son, Ethan Allen. Originally 8.25 miles in length (now 8.5 miles), the trail leads to the summit of Mt. Washington.

== Types ==
Trails can be located in different settings for various uses. These can include:

=== Segregated ===
Trail segregation, the practice of designating certain trails as having a specific preferred or exclusive use, is increasingly common and diverse. For example, bike trails are used not only on roads open to motor vehicles but also in trail systems open to other trail users. Some trails are segregated for use by both equestrians and mountain bikes or by equestrians or mountain bikes alone. Designated "wilderness area" trails may be segregated for non-wheeled use permitting backpacking and horses but not permitting mountain bikes and motorized vehicles.

Often, trail segregation for a particular use is accompanied by prohibitions against that use on other trails within the trail system. Trail segregation may be supported by signage, markings, trail design and construction (especially the selection of tread materials), and by separation between parallel treads. Separation may be achieved by "natural" barriers including distance, ditching, banking, grading, and vegetation, and by "artificial" barriers including fencing, curbing, and walls.

==== Bicycle ====
Bicycle trails encompass a wide variety of trail types, including shared-use paths used for commuting, off-road cross-country trails and downhill mountain bike trails.

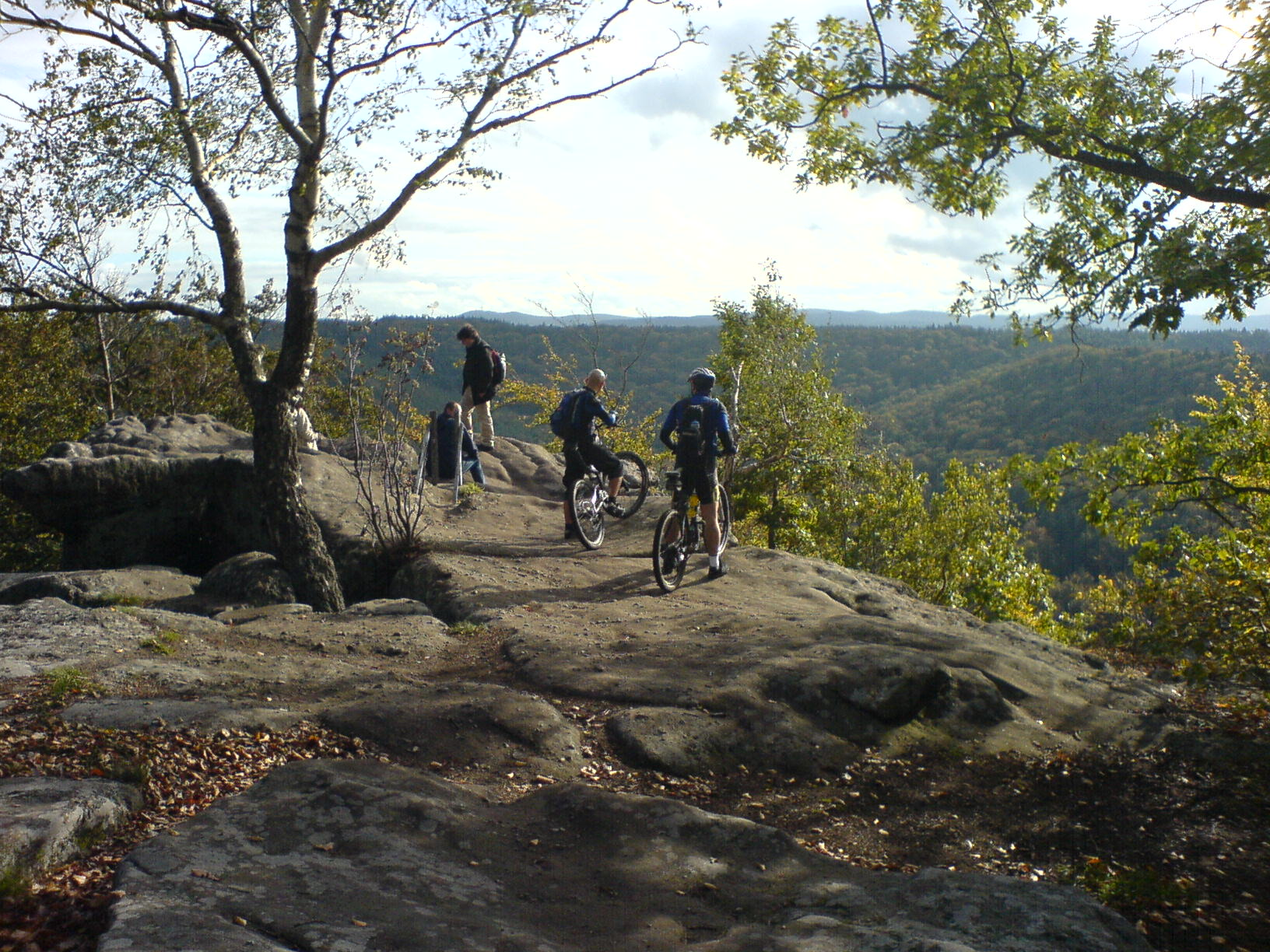
Hikers and mountain bikers on top of the Drachenfels (Dragon's Rock) in the Palatinate Forest, Germany

The number of off-road cycle trails has increased significantly, along with the popularity of mountain bikes. Off-road bicycle trails are generally function-specific and most commonly waymarked along their route. They may take the form of single routes or form part of larger complexes, known as trail centers. Off-road trails often incorporate a mix of challenging terrain, singletrack, smooth fireroads, and even paved paths. Trails with an easy or moderate technical complexity are generally deemed cross-country trails, while trails difficult even to experienced riders are more often dubbed all-mountain, freeride, or downhill. Downhilling is popular at ski resorts like Mammoth Mountain in California, or Whistler Blackcomb in British Columbia, where ski lifts are used to get bikes and riders to the top of the mountain.

EuroVelo bicycle routes are a network of (currently 17) long-distance cycling routes criss-crossing Europe in various stages of completion; more than 90,000 km (55,923 mi) was in place by 2020. EuroVelo is a project of the European Cyclists' Federation (ECF).

EuroVelo routes can be used for bicycle touring across the continent, and by local people making short journeys. The routes comprise both existing national bike routes, such as the Dutch LF-Routes, the German D-Routes, and the British National Cycle Network, and existing general-purpose roads, together with new stretches of cycle routes to connect them.

Off-road cycling can cause soil erosion and habitat destruction if not carried out on established trails. This is true when trails are wet, though overall, cycling may not have more of an impact as other trail users.

==== Cross-country skiing ====
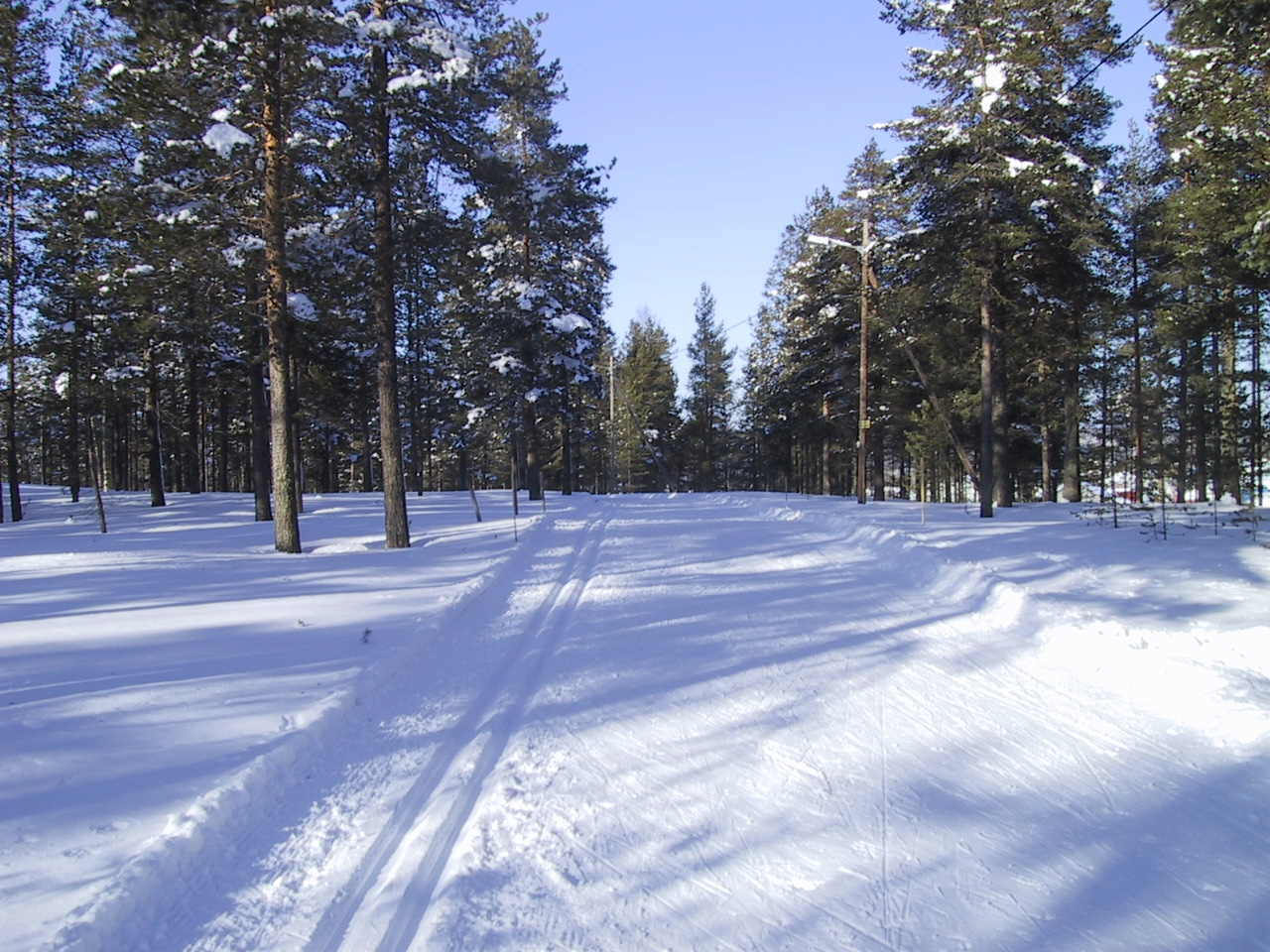
Prepared ski trails for cross-country skiing

In cross-country skiing, a trail is also called a track or piste. Recreational cross-country skiing is also called touring, especially in Europe. Some skiers stay out for extended periods using tents and equipment similar to bushwalkers and hikers, whereas others take shorter trips from ski resorts on maintained trails. In some countries, organizations maintain a network of huts for use by cross-country skiers in wintertime. For example, the Norwegian Mountain Touring Association maintains over 400 huts stretching across hundreds of kilometres of trails hikers use in the summer and skiers use in the winter.

==== Equestrian ====
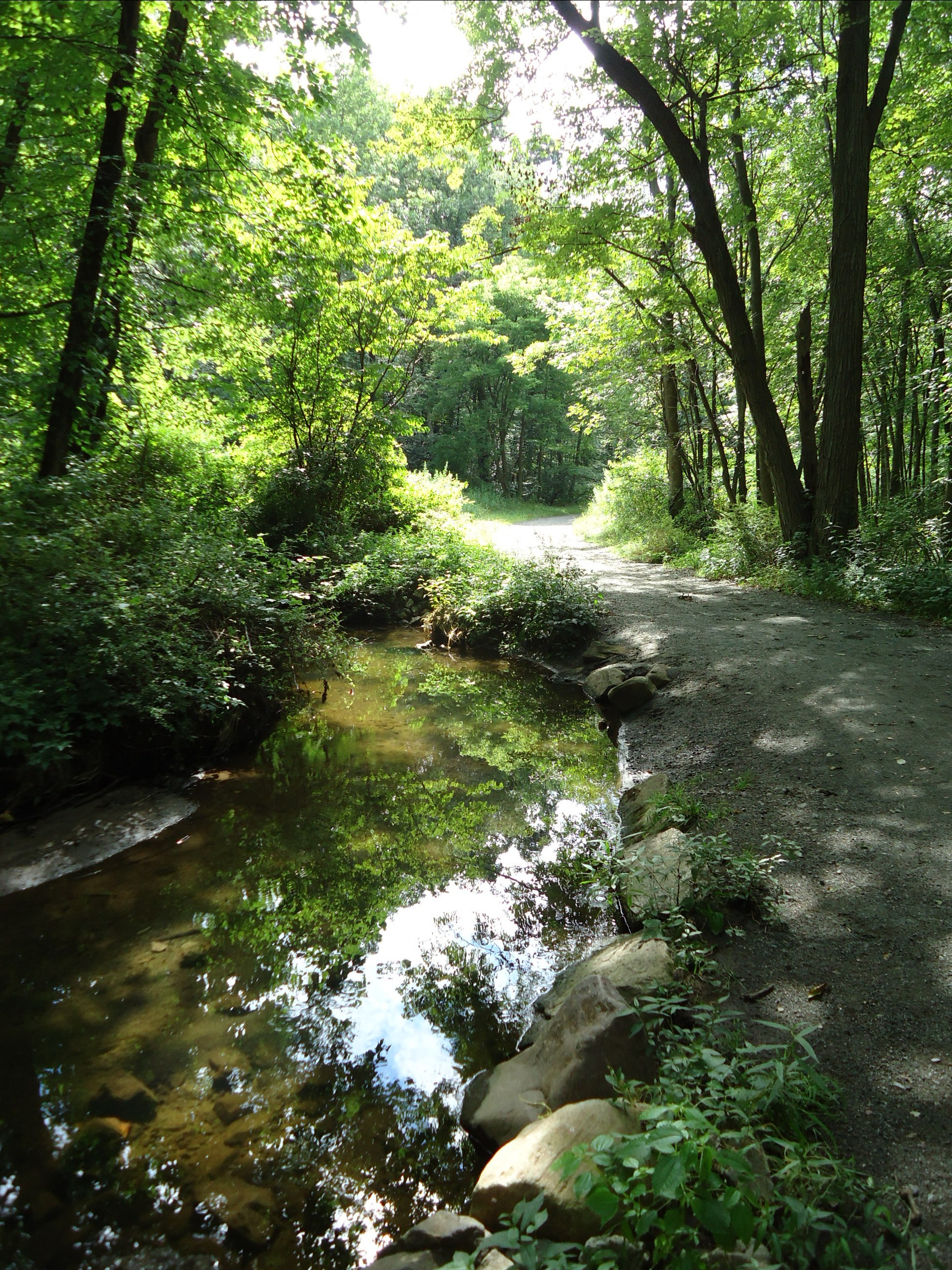
A combination horse and hiking trail in a suburb of New York City

Horse riding and other equestrian uses of trails continue to be a popular activity for many trail users. Horses can usually negotiate much the same grades as hikers, but not always, although they can more easily clear obstacles in the path such as logs.

The Bicentennial National Trail (BNT) in Australia is one of the longest marked multi-use trails in the world, stretching 5,330 km (3,312 mi) from Cooktown, Queensland, through New South Wales to Healesville, Victoria. This trail runs the length of the rugged Great Dividing Range through national parks, private property and alongside of wilderness areas. One of the objectives was to develop a trail that linked up the brumby tracks, mustering and stock routes along the Great Dividing Range, thus providing an opportunity to legally ride the routes of stockmen and drovers who once travelled these areas with pack horses. This Trail provides access to some of the wildest, most remote country in the world. The Bicentennial National Trail is suitable for self-reliant horse riders, fit walkers and mountain bike riders.

Within the United States National Trail Classification System, equestrian trails include simple day-use bridle paths and others built to accommodate long strings of pack animals on journeys lasting many days. Trail design parameters for these uses include trail base width and material, trail clear width, trail clear height, access to water suitable for stock (not human) use, and trail routing.

==== Pedestrian ====
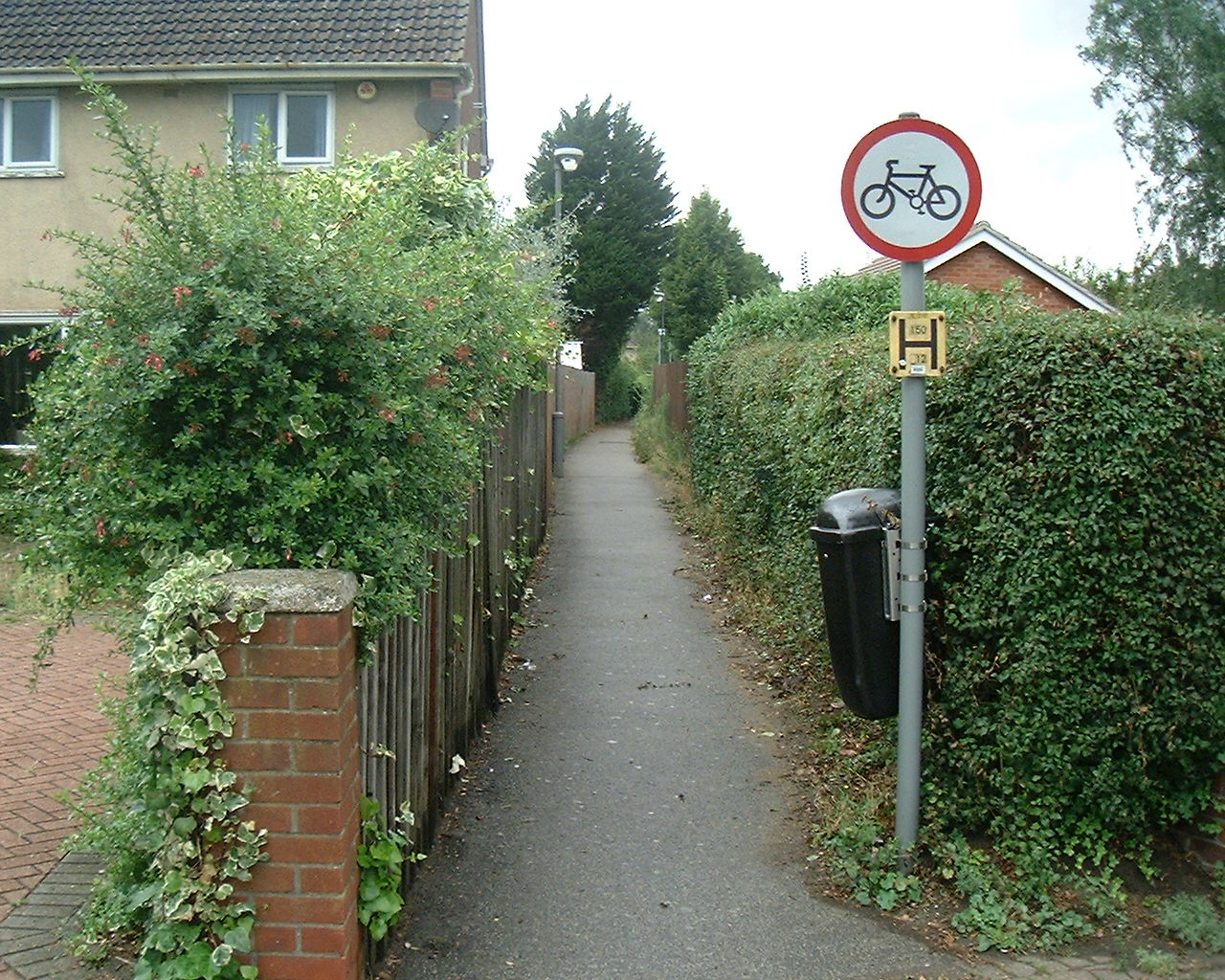
An urban footpath in Ipswich, Suffolk, United Kingdom, which prohibits cycling

A footpath is a type of thoroughfare that is intended for use only by pedestrians either within an urban area or through the countryside. An urban footpath is usually called an alley or lane and often paved (see also: sidewalk and pavement). Other public rights of way, such as bridleways, byways, towpaths, and green lanes are also used by pedestrians.

In England and Wales, there are rights of way on which pedestrians have a legally protected right to travel. National parks, nature preserves, conservation areas and other protected wilderness areas may have trails that are restricted to pedestrians.

Footpaths can be connected to form a long-distance trail or way, which can be used by both day hikers and backpackers. Some trails are over 1,000 miles (1,600 km) long.

In the US and Canada, where urban sprawl has reached rural communities, developers and local leaders are currently striving to make their communities more conducive to non-motorized transportation through the use of less traditional trails. The Robert Wood Johnson Foundation in the US has established the Active Living by Design program to improve the livability of communities in part through developing trails, The Upper Valley Trails Alliance in Vermont has done similar work on traditional trails, while the Somerville Community Path in Somerville, Massachusetts, and related paths, are examples of urban initiatives. In St. John's, Newfoundland, Canada the "Grand Concourse", is an integrated walkway system that has over 160 km (99 mi) of walkways, which link every major park, river, pond and green space in six municipalities.

==== Motor ====
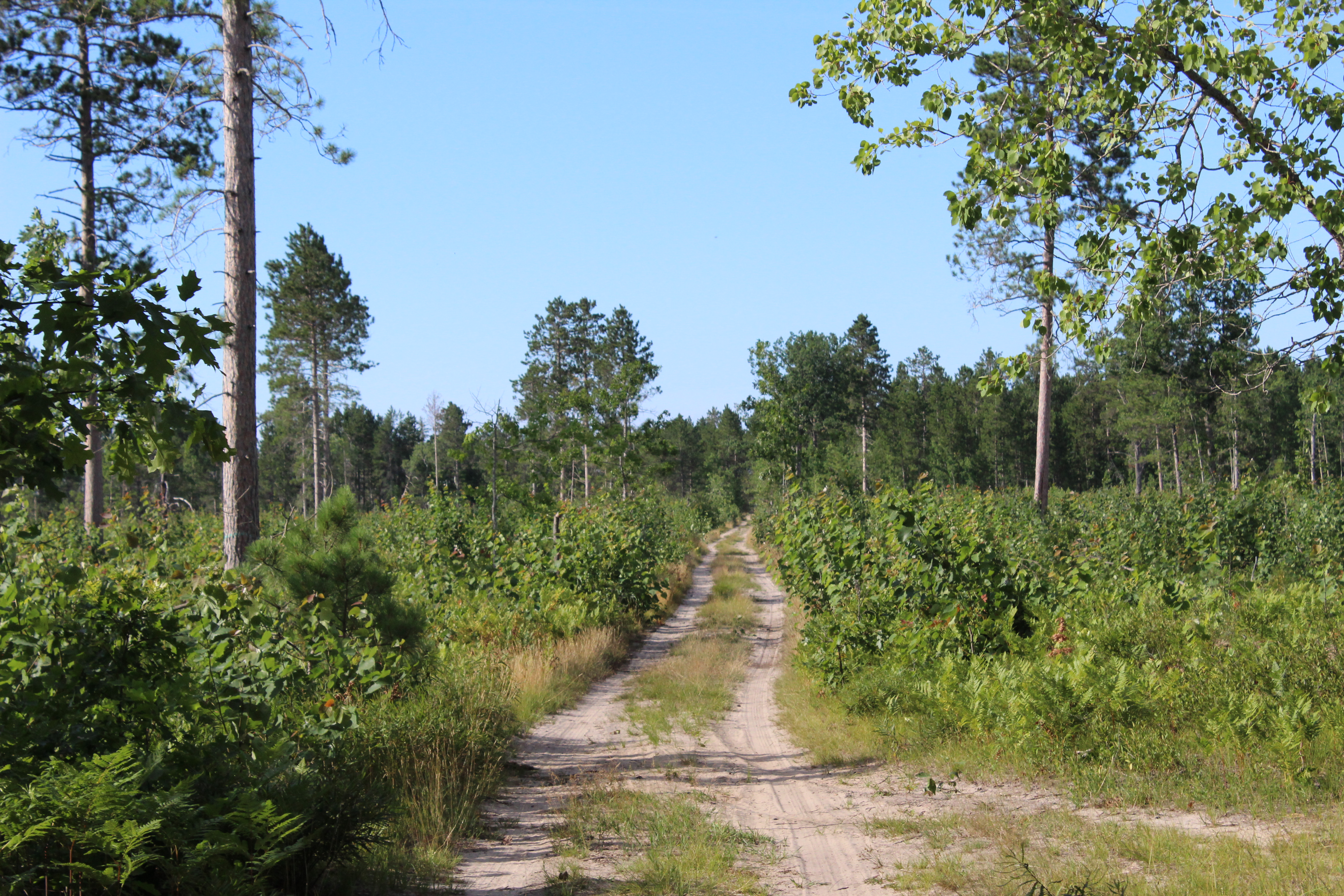
An off-road trail leading into a forest.

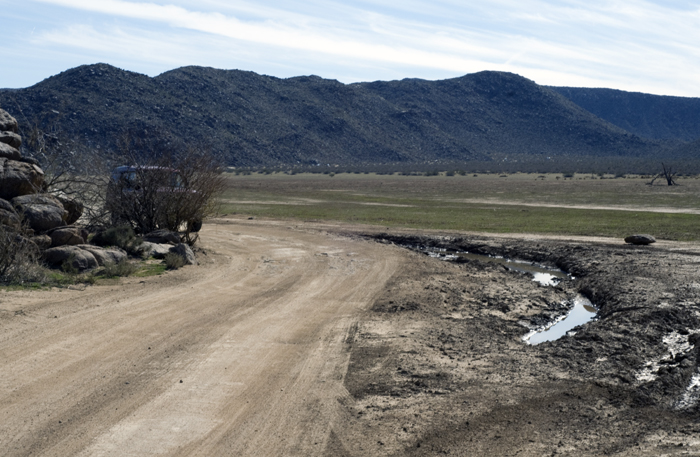
Damage that occurred when vehicles left the posted trail at Anza-Borrego Desert State Park.

A motorized trail is a trail intended for off-road vehicles, potentially including 4×4 cars, dirt bikes, and all-terrain vehicles (ATV), although trails may restrict the nature of vehicles that are permitted to operate upon them.

Many motorized trails are maintained on federal land within the United States. The Recreational Trails Program defined as part of the Intermodal Surface Transportation Efficiency Act of 1991 mandates that states must use a minimum of 30 percent of these funds for motorized trail uses.

Some members of the US government and environmental organizations, including the Sierra Club and The Wilderness Society. have criticized off-road vehicle use on public land. They have noted several consequences of illegal ORV use such as pollution, trail damage, erosion, land degradation, possible species extinction, and habitat destruction which can leave hiking trails impassable. ORV proponents argue legal use taking place under planned access along with the multiple environmental and trail conservation efforts by ORV groups will mitigate these issues. Groups such as the BlueRibbon Coalition advocate Treadlightly, which is the responsible use of public lands used for off-road activities.

A British Columbia Ministry of Forests forest service road in steep terrain at the Lower Seymour Conservation Reserve near North Vancouver, British Columbia, Canada

Noise pollution is also a concern, and several studies conducted by Montana State University, California State University, the University of Florida and others have cited possible negative behavioral changes in wildlife as the result of some ORV use. Several US states such as Washington have laws to reduce noise generated by off-road and non-highway vehicles.

==== Water ====
Water trails, also referred to as blueways or paddling trails, are marked routes on navigable waterways such as rivers, lakes, canals and coastlines for people using small non-motorized boats such as kayaks, canoes, rafts, or rowboats. Some trails may be suitable for float tubing or developed in concert with motorized use. They include: signs and route markers; maps; facilities for parking, boat ramps or docks, and places to camp and picnic. There are also state programs and other promotion for water trails in the United States. The American Canoe Association has compiled a database of water trails in the United States. The National Park Service Rivers, Trails, and Conservation Assistance Program has compiled a list of water trail resources, success stories, and statewide contacts for water trails.

=== Shared-use ===
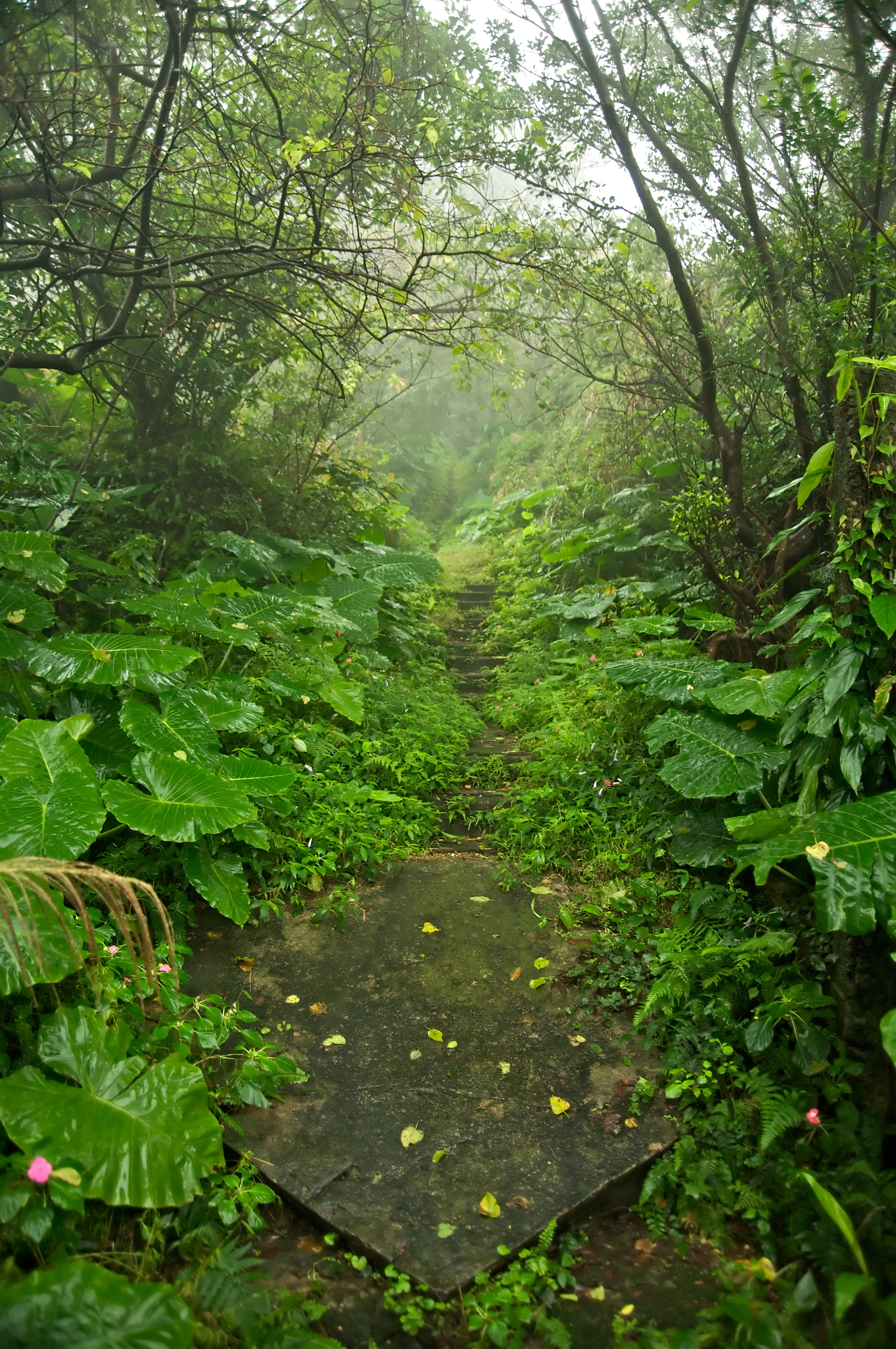
An abandoned mining trail in the Jinguashi mining area in Taiwan

Shared use may be achieved by sharing a trail easement, but maintaining segregated and sometimes also separated trail treads within it. This is common with rail trails. Shared use may also refer to alternate day arrangements, whereby two uses are segregated by being permitted every other day. This is increasingly common on long-distance trails shared by equestrians and mountain bike users; these two user communities have similar trail requirements but may experience difficult encounters with each other on the trail.

The Trans Canada Trail can be used by cyclists, hikers, horseback riders, and walkers, as well as cross-country skiers, snowmobilers and snowshoers in winter.

In the United States, the East Coast Greenway—3,000 mi (4,828 km) from Key West to the Canadian border— and the 11 September National Memorial Trail, a 1,300 mi (2,092 km) triangular loop connecting the three 9/11 memorial sites, are two long-distance multi-use paths for cyclists, runners, walkers, even equestrians.

In Belgium RAVeL, French for réseau autonome de voies lentes (autonomous network of slow ways), is a Walloon initiative aimed at creating a network of route itineraries reserved for pedestrians, cyclists, horse riders and people with reduced mobility. The 1,350 km (840 mi) network makes use of towpaths on river banks and disused railway or vicinal tramway lines ( narrow-gauge tramways). Old railway lines have been leased by the Walloon Government for 99 years using emphyteutic lease contracts. Where necessary, new paths are created to link parts of the network.

In England and Wales a bridleway is a trail intended for use by equestrians, but walkers also have a right of way, and Section 30 of the Countryside Act 1968, permits the riding of bicycles (but not motor-cycles) on public bridleways, though the act says it "shall not create any obligation to facilitate the use of the bridleway by cyclists". Thus the right to cycle exists even though it may be difficult to exercise on occasion, especially in winter. Cyclists using a bridleway must give way to other users on foot or horseback.

The seawall in Stanley Park, Vancouver, British Columbia, Canada is popular for walking, running, cycling, and inline skating. There are two paths, one for skaters and cyclists and the other for pedestrians. The lane for cyclists and skaters goes one-way in a counterclockwise loop.

Foreshoreway (also oceanway) is a term used in Australia for a type of greenway that provides a public right-of-way along the edge of the sea open to both walkers and cyclists.

==== Forest road ====
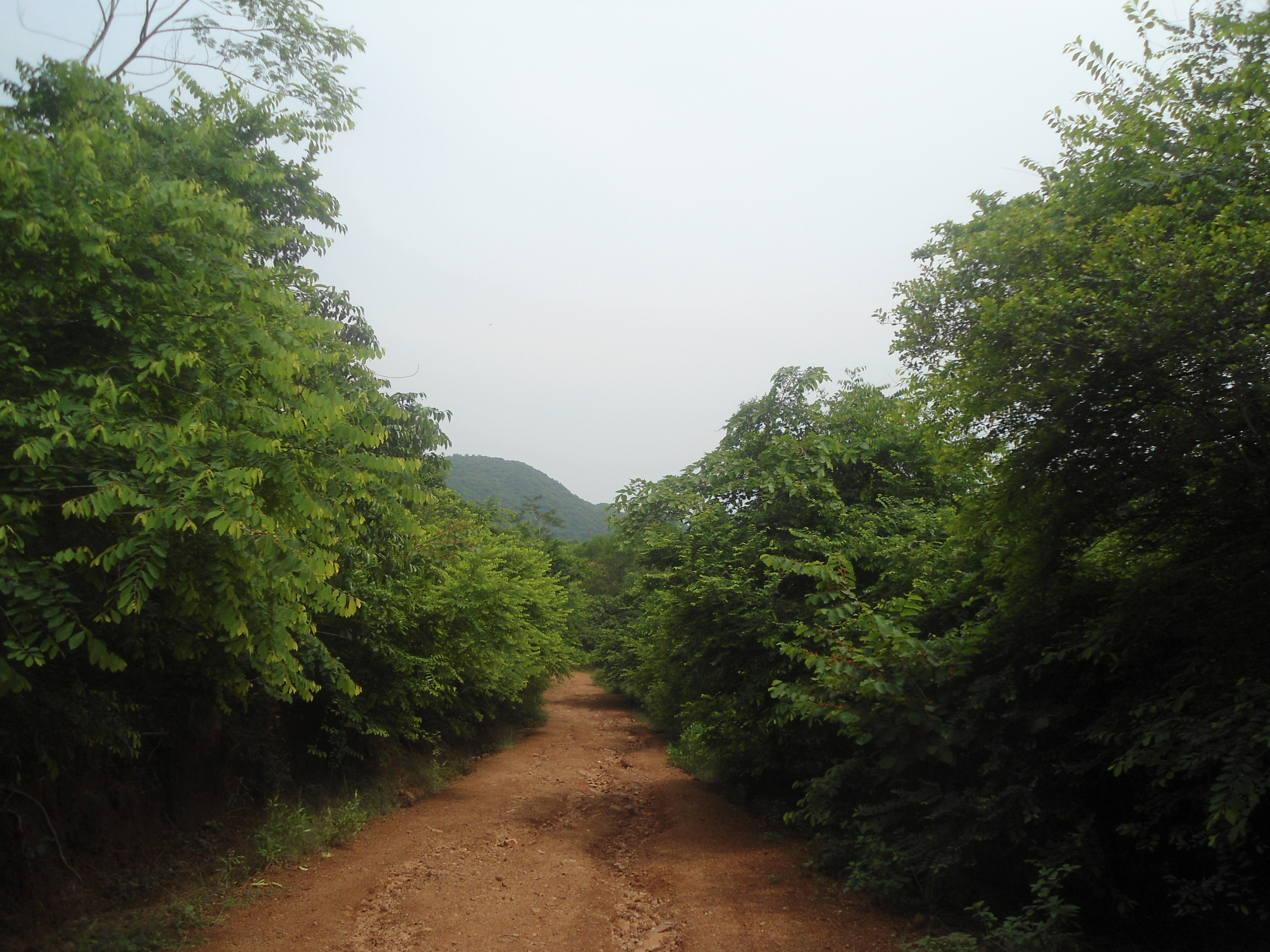
Trail in Kambalakonda Ecopark near Visakhapatnam

A forest road is a type of rudimentary access road, built mainly for the forest industry. In some cases they are used for backcountry recreation access.

There is open access to most Forestry Commission roads and land in Great Britain for walkers, cyclists and horse riders and, since the Countryside Bill of 1968, it has become the largest provider of outdoor recreation in Britain. The commission works with associations involved in rambling, cycling, mountain biking and horse riding to promote the use of its land for recreation. The trails open to the public are not just forest roads. A notable example of the commission's promotion of outdoor activity is the 7stanes project in Scotland, where seven purpose built areas of mountain bike trails have been laid, including facilities for disabled cyclists.

==== Holloway ====
A Holloway (also hollow way) is a sunken path or lane, i.e., a road or track that is significantly lower than the land on either side, not formed by the (recent) engineering of a road cutting but possibly of much greater age. Various mechanisms have been proposed for how holloways may have been formed, including erosion by water or traffic; the digging of embankments to assist with the herding of livestock; and the digging of double banks to mark the boundaries of estates. These mechanisms are all possible and could apply in different cases.

==== Rail ====
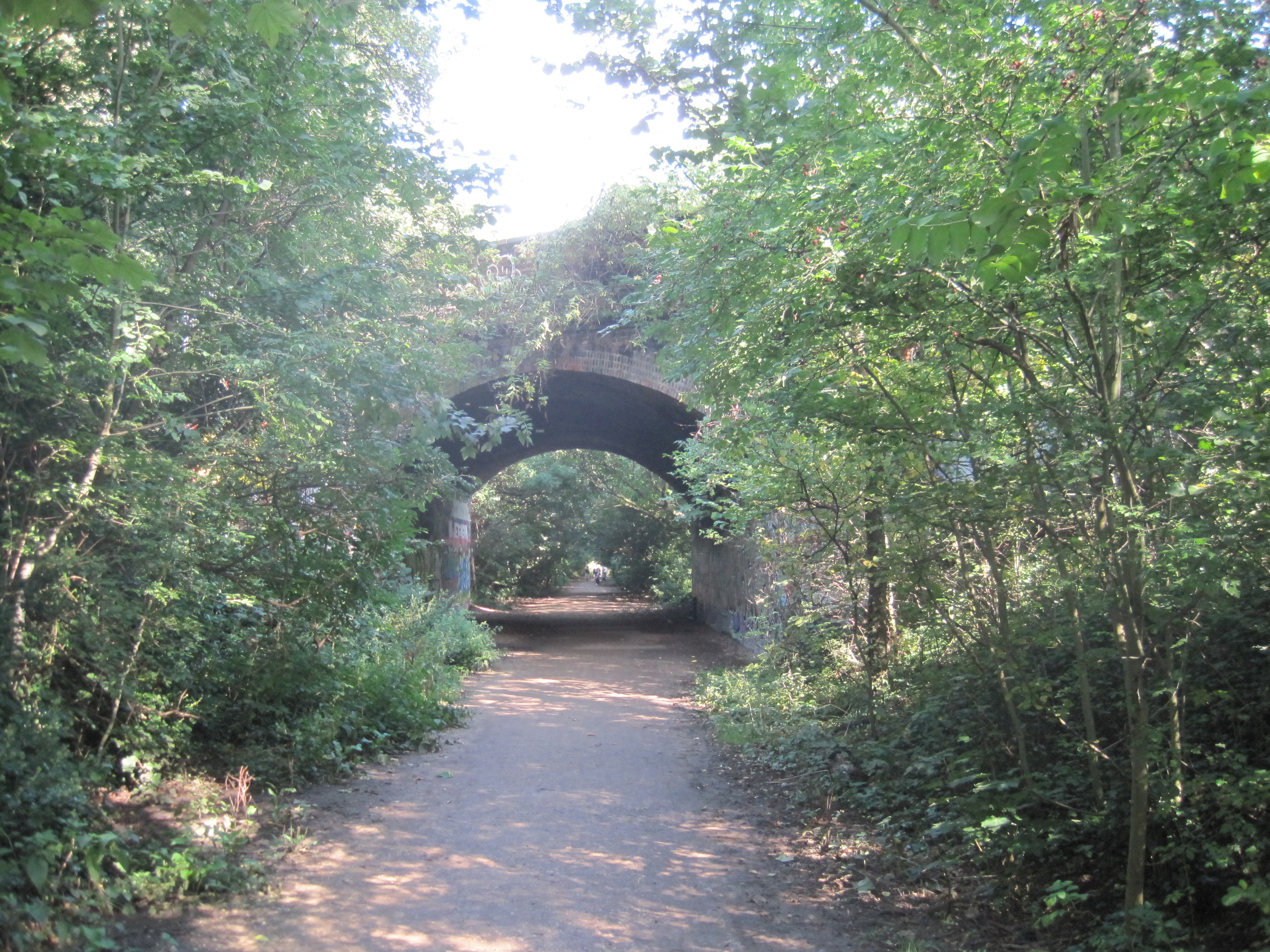
Parkland Walk rail trail, Islington, London, England

Rail trails or paths are shared-use paths that take advantage of abandoned railway corridors. They can be used for walking, cycling and horseback riding. They exist throughout the world. RailTrails Australia describes them as:

Following the route of the railways, they cut through hills, under roads, over embankments and across gullies and creeks. Apart from being great places to walk, cycle or horse ride, rail trails are linear conservation corridors protecting native plants and animals. They often link remnant vegetation in farming areas and contain valuable flora and fauna habitat. Wineries and other attractions are near many trails as well as B&B's and other great places to stay.

Most trails have a gravel or dirt surface suitable for walking, mountain bikes and horses. In the USA the 42 mi (68 km) Cheshire Rail Trail, in New Hampshire, can be used by hikers, horseback riders, snowmobilers, cross-country skiers, cyclists, and even dogsledders. In Canada, following the abandonment of the Prince Edward Island Railway in 1989, the government of Prince Edward Island purchased the right-of-way to the entire railway system. The Confederation Trail was developed as a tip-to-tip walking/cycling gravel rail trail which doubles as a monitored and groomed snowmobile trail during the winter months, operated by the PEI Snowmobile Association. A considerable part of the Trans Canada trail is repurposed defunct rail lines donated to provincial governments by the Canadian Pacific and Canadian National railways rebuilt as walking trails. Much of the Trans Canada Trail development emulated the successful Rails-to-Trails initiative in the United States. The Trail is multi-use and depending on the section may allow hikers, bicyclists, horseback riders, cross-country skiers and snowmobilers.

==== Towpath ====
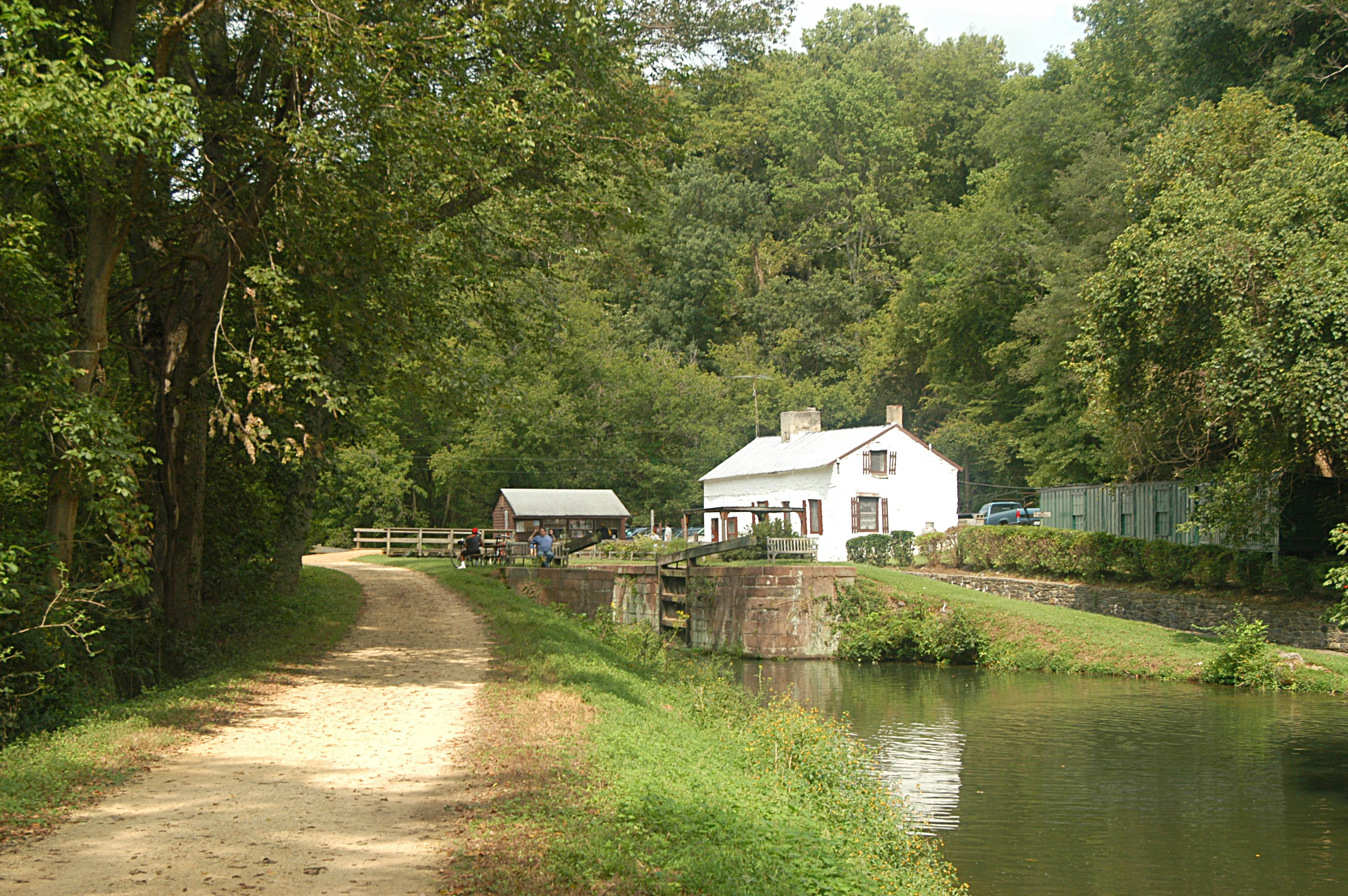
Swain's Lock on the C & O Canal in Maryland, United States

A towpath is a road or path on the bank of a river, canal, or other inland waterway. The original purpose of a towpath was to allow a horse or a team of human pullers to tow a boat, often a barge. They can be paved or unpaved and are popular with cyclists and walkers; some are suitable for equestrians. Equestrians have legal access to all towpaths in Scotland, and there is a campaign for similar rights in England and Wales. In snowy winters in the USA they are popular with cross-country skiers and snowmobile users.

Most canals were owned by private companies in Britain, and the towpaths were deemed to be private for the benefit of legitimate users of the canal. The nationalisation of the canal system in 1948 did not result in the towpaths becoming public rights of way, and subsequent legislation, such as the Transport Act of 1968, which defined the government's obligations to the maintenance of the inland waterways for which it was now responsible, did not include any commitment to maintain towpaths for use by anyone. Ten years later, British Waterways started to relax the rule that a permit was required to give access to a towpath and began to encourage leisure usage by walkers; anglers; and, in some areas, cyclists. The British Waterways Act 1995 still did not enshrine any right of public access although it encouraged recreational access of all kinds to the network. However, the steady development of the leisure use of the canals and the decline of commercial traffic had resulted in a general acceptance that towpaths are open to everyone, not just boat users. The concept of free access to towpaths is enshrined in the legislation which transferred responsibility for the English and Welsh canals from British Waterways to the Canal & River Trust in 2012.

Not all towpaths are suitable for use by cyclists, but on those that are on canals owned by British Waterways, a permit is required. There is no charge for a permit, but it acts as an opportunity to inform cyclists about safe and unsafe areas to cycle. Some areas including London are exempt from this policy but are covered by the London Towpath Code of Conduct, and cyclists must have a bell, which they ring twice when approaching pedestrians. Parts of some towpaths have been incorporated into the National Cycle Network, and in most cases, this has resulted in the surface being improved.

In France, it is possible to cycle, rollerblade, and hike along the banks of the Canal du Midi. A paved stretch of 50 km (31 mi) from Toulouse to Avignonet-Lauragais and another 12 km (7.5 mi) between Béziers and Portiragnes are particularly suited to cycling and rollerblading. It is possible to cycle or walk the entire Canal des Deux Mers from Sète to Bordeaux. Other French canals provide walkers "with many excellent routes, as they are always accompanied by a towpath, which makes a pleasant off-road track, and have the added virtues of flatness, shade and an abundance of villages along the way", though walking a canal can be monotonous, so that "a long trip beside a canal is better done by bicycle".

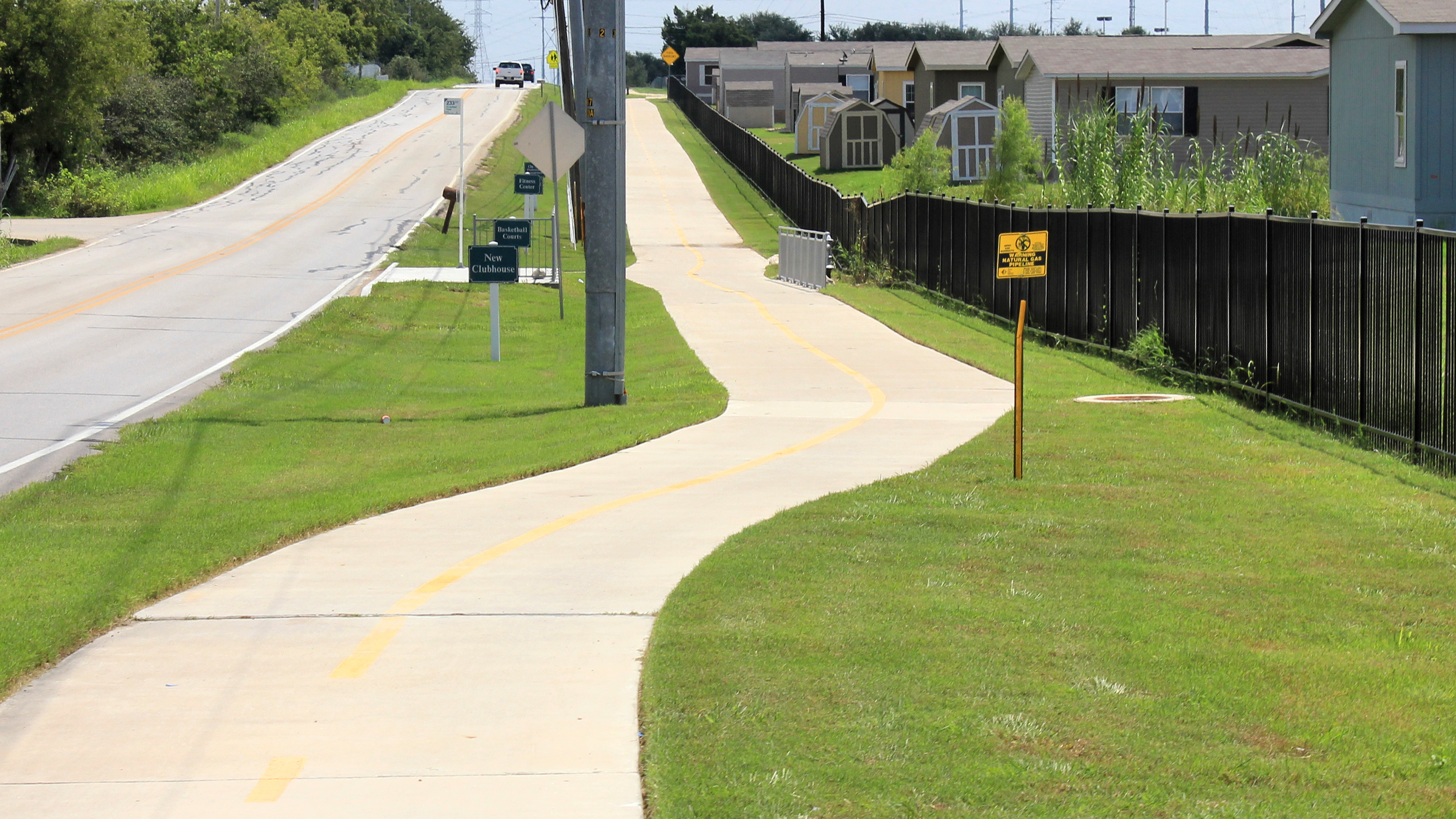
Part of the Northern Walnut Creek Trail, an urban trail in Austin, Texas, United States

=== Urban ===
An urban trail is a citywide network of non-motorized, multi-use pathways that are used by bicyclists, walkers and runners for transportation and recreation. Urban trails have a variety of surfaces, and some designated for two-way traffic.

==== Alley ====
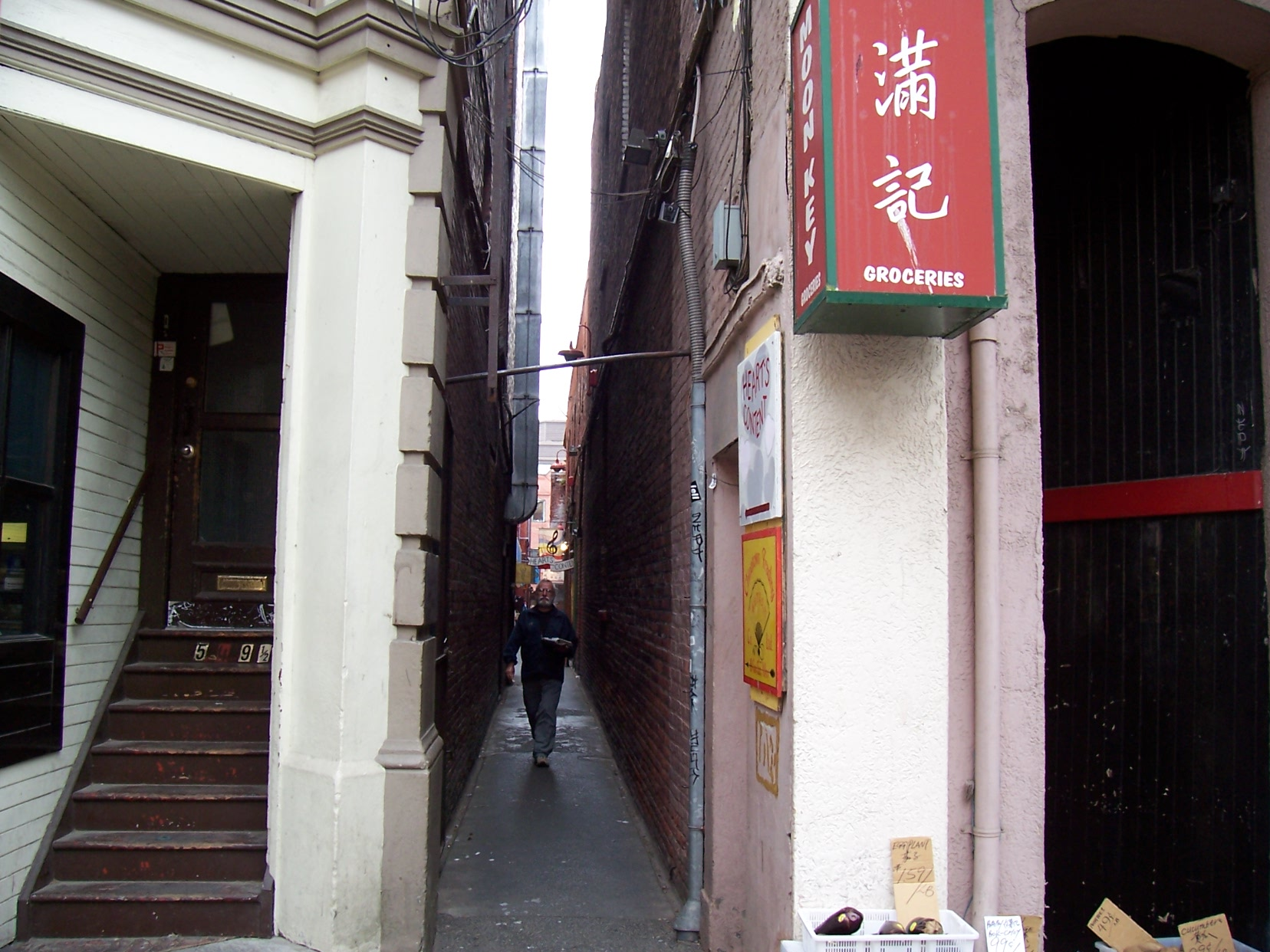
View into Fan Tan Alley, Victoria, British Columbia, Canada

Urban pedestrian footpaths are sometimes called alleys or lanes and in older cities and towns in Europe and are often what is left of a medieval street network or rights-of-way or ancient footpaths. Similar paths also exist in some older North American towns and cities, like Charleston, South Carolina, New Castle, Delaware, and Pittsburgh, Pennsylvania. Such urban trails or footpaths are narrow, usually paved and often between the walls of buildings. This type is usually short and straight, and on steep ground can consist partially or entirely of steps. Some are named. Because of geography, stairs are a common form of footpath in hilly cities and towns. This includes those in Pittsburgh, Cincinnati, Seattle, Portland, Oregon, and San Francisco in the United States, as well as Hong Kong, Quebec City, Quebec, Canada, and Rome. Stairway trails are found in a number of hilly American cities. This includes the Stairway Trails in Bernal Heights, East San Francisco.

== System layout ==
=== Linear ===
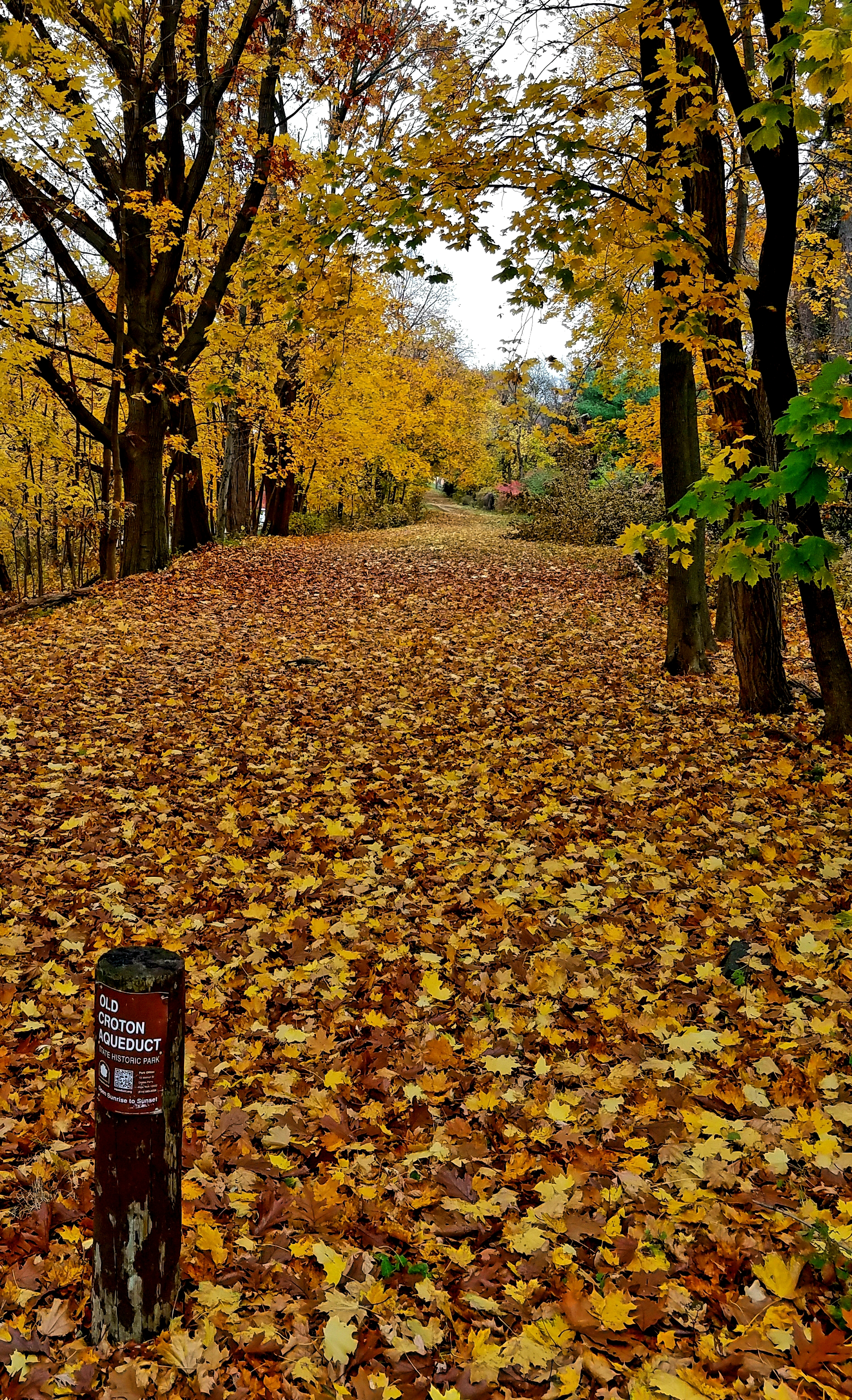
Old Croton Aqueduct State Historic Park in Westchester County, New York, United States

A linear trail goes from one point to another without connecting trails. These trails are also known as "out-and-back" or "destination" trails. Rail trails and long-distance trails are examples of linear trails. Linear trails usually follow long distances. A shorter linear trail is a spur trail, which takes a user to a particular point-of-interest, such as a waterfall or mountain summit. The Old Croton Aqueduct State Historic Park in Westchester County, New York, United States, is a long-distance linear trail.

=== Looped ===
A looped trail allows a user to end up where they started with either minimal or no repeating parts of the trail. Looped-trail systems come in many permutations. A single-looped trail system is often used around lakes, wetlands, and other geological features. A series of looped trails is a stacked-loop trail system. A stacked loop trail system has several interconnected looped trails. This creates an efficient, compact design with many route options. In a multiple-loop system, each loop extends from a single trailhead.

Trail systems often combine linear trails with looped trails. In a spoked-wheel system, linear trails connect a central trailhead with an outer loop. In a primary-and-secondary loop system, linear trails connect a primary loop with secondary loops. Last, a maze system incorporates both loops and linear trails. Maze systems provide users many choices; some users may find navigation difficult.

== Administration ==
=== Europe ===
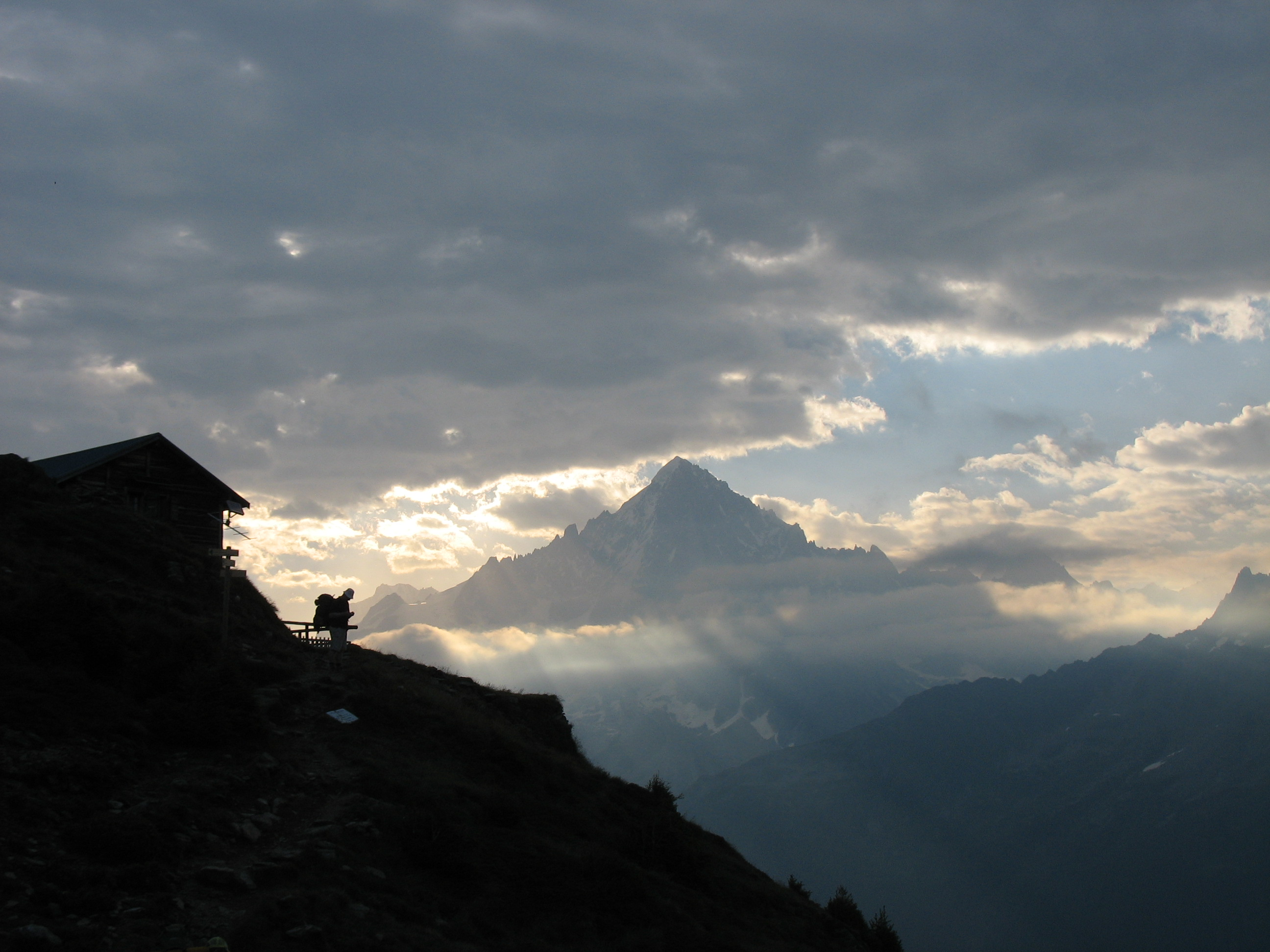
A walker preparing to leave the Refuge de Bel Lachat, Chamonix, in the French Alps, on the long-distance path GR5

A group of public and private organisations from the eight Alpine countries in Europe created the Via Alpina in 2000, receiving EU funding from 2001 until 2008. It was initiated by the Association Grande Traversée des Alpes in Grenoble, which hosted the Via Alpina international secretariat until January 2014, when it was transferred to the International Commission for the Protection of the Alps CIPRA, in Liechtenstein. There are national secretariats (hosted by public administrations or hiking associations) in each country. Its aim is to support sustainable development in remote mountain areas and promote the Alpine cultures and cultural exchanges.

The Grande Randonnée (French), Grote Routepaden or Lange-afstand-wandelpaden (Dutch), Grande Rota (Portuguese) or Gran Recorrido (Spanish) is a network of long-distance footpaths in Europe, mostly in France, Belgium, the Netherlands and Spain. Many GR routes make up part of the longer European walking routes which cross several countries. In France alone, the trails cover approximately 60,000 km (37,000 mi). In France, the network is maintained by the Fédération Française de la Randonnée Pédestre (French Hiking Federation), and in Spain by the Spanish Mountain Sports Federation.

=== UK and Ireland ===
In England and Wales, many trails and footpaths are of ancient origin and are protected under law as rights of way. In Ireland, the Keep Ireland Open organization is campaigning for similar rights. Local highway authorities, in England and Wales, (usually county councils or unitary authorities) are required to maintain the definitive map of all public rights of way in their areas, and these can be inspected at council offices. If a path is shown on the definitive map, and no subsequent order (e.g. a stopping up) exists, the right of way is conclusive in law. However, a path that is not on that map may still be a public path, as the rights may not have been recorded. The Countryside Agency estimated that over 10% of public paths are not yet listed on the definitive map. The Countryside and Rights of Way Act 2000 provides that paths that are not recorded on the definitive map by 2026 and that were in use prior to 1949 will automatically be deemed stopped-up on 1 January 2026.

In Scotland, a right of way is a route over which the public has passed unhindered for at least 20 years. The route must link two "public places", such as villages, churches or roads. Unlike in England and Wales, there is no obligation on Scottish local authorities to signpost or mark a right of way. The charity Scotways, formed in 1845 to protect rights of way, records and signs the routes. There is no legal distinction between footpaths and bridleways in Scotland, as there is in England and Wales, though it is generally accepted that cyclists and horseback riders may follow rights of way with suitable surfaces.

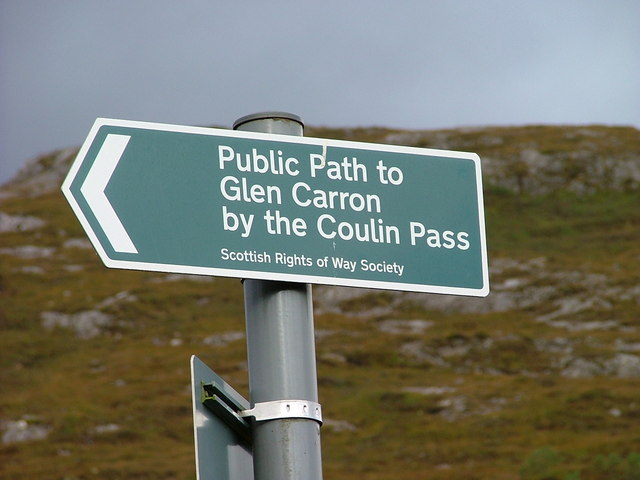
Scotways sign for a Scottish public path

The Land Reform (Scotland) Act 2003 established a general presumption of access to all land in Scotland, making the existence of rights of way less important in terms of access to land in Scotland. Certain categories of land are excluded from this presumption of open access such as railway land, airfields and private gardens.

Northern Ireland has very few public rights of way, and access to land there is more restricted than other parts of the UK. In many areas, walkers can enjoy the countryside only because of the goodwill and tolerance of landowners. Northern Ireland shares the same legal system as England, including concepts about the ownership of land and public rights of way, but it has its own court structure, system of precedents and specific access legislation.

In England and Wales, a National Trails system of long-distance footpaths also exists administered by Natural England and the Natural Resources Wales, statutory agencies of the UK and the Welsh Governments, respectively. These include Hadrian's Wall Path, the Pembrokeshire Coast Path, the Pennine Bridleway (bridleway), the South West Coast Path (South West Way) (the longest), and the Thames Path, and many more. Together these are over 4,000 km (2,500 mi) long.

In Scotland, the equivalent trails are called Scotland's Great Trails and are administered by NatureScot. The first, and probably the most popular, is the West Highland Way, which is 152 km (94 mi) long and was opened in 1980.

Sustrans is a British charity that promotes sustainable transport, and it works on projects to encourage people to walk, cycle, and use public transport, to give people the choice of "travelling in ways that benefit their health and the environment". Sustrans' flagship project is the National Cycle Network, which has created over 14,000 mi (23,000 km) of signed cycle routes throughout the UK.

=== United States ===
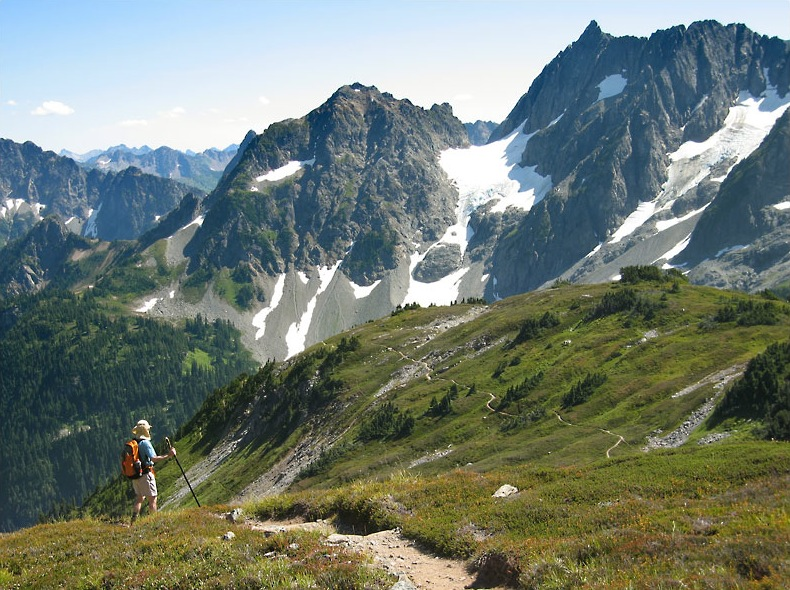
A trail north of Cascade Pass, North Cascades National Park, Washington, United States

In 1968, the United States' National Trails System, which includes National Scenic Trails, National Historic Trails and National Recreation Trails, was created under the National Trails System Act. The most famous American long trails are the Appalachian National Scenic Trail, generally known as the Appalachian Trail and the Pacific Crest Trail. The Appalachian Trail is a marked hiking route in the eastern United States extending between Springer Mountain, Georgia, and Mount Katahdin, Maine. The trail is approximately 2,200 miles (3,500 km) long. The Pacific Crest Trail is a long-distance hiking and equestrian trail closely aligned with the highest portion of the Sierra Nevada and Cascade mountain ranges, which lie 100 to 150 miles (160 to 240 km) east of the US Pacific coast. The trail's southern terminus is on the US border with Mexico and its northern terminus on the US-Canada border on the edge of Manning Park in British Columbia, Canada; its corridor through the US is in the states of California, Oregon, and Washington. It is 2,663 miles (4,286 km) long.

The land management agency in charge of a trail writes and enforces the rules and regulations for it. A trail may be completely contained within one administration (e.g. a State Park) or it may pass through multiple administrations, leading to a confusing array of regulations, allowing dogs or mountain bikes in one segment but not in another, or requiring Wilderness Permits for a portion of the trail, but not everywhere.

In the United States agencies administering trails include the National Park Service, the US Forest Service, the Bureau of Land Management, State Park systems, County Parks, cities, private organizations such as land trusts, businesses and individual property owners.

New trail construction by an agency must often be assessed for its environmental impact and conformance with State or Federal laws. For example, in California new trails must undergo reviews specified by the California Environmental Quality Act (CEQA).

==== Universal access ====
All trails and shared use paths—indeed, any areas open to pedestrians—that are owned or operated by a public or private entity covered by the Americans with Disabilities Act of 1990 are subject to federal regulations on Other Power-Driven Mobility Devices ("OPDMDs"). These rules potentially greatly expand the types of vehicular devices that must be permitted on trails, shared use paths, other routes, and other areas open to the public. This publication discusses ways to manage access by these vehicles.

There are many types of non-motorized, land-based recreational trails and shared use paths: hiker and pedestrian trails, mountain biking trails, equestrian trails, and multi-use trails designed for several user types. The companion guide to this publication, the 2013 Pennsylvania Trail Design and Development Principles: Guidelines for Sustainable, Non-Motorized Trails (the "Pennsylvania Trail Design Manual"), provides guidance and detailed information about the characteristics of the various types of trails and paths. The publication is a resource to help evaluate, plan, design, construct, and manage a route on a site. The publication Universal Access Trails and Shared Use Paths: Design, Management, Ethical and Legal Considerations focuses on the accessibility aspects of the most commonly constructed types.

== Construction ==
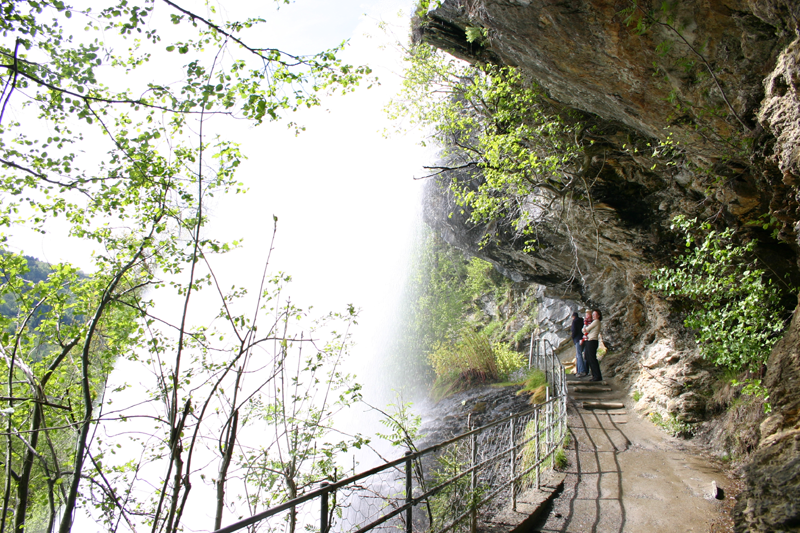
A trail constructed under the waterfall Steinsdalsfossen, Norway

While most trails have arisen through common usage, the design and construction of good quality new paths is a complex process that requires certain skills.

When a trail passes across a flat area that is not wet, brush, tree limbs and undergrowth are removed to create a clear, walkable trail. A bridge is built when a stream or river is sufficiently deep to make it necessary. Other options are culverts, stepping stones, and shallow fords. For equestrian use, shallow fords may be preferred. In wet areas an elevated trailway with fill or a boardwalk is often used, though boardwalks require frequent maintenance and replacement, because boards in poor condition can become slippery and hazardous.

=== Slopes ===
Trail gradients are determined based on a site specific assessment of soils and geology, drainage patterns of the slope, surrounding vegetation types, position on the slope of a given trail segment (bottom, mid-slope, ridgeline), average precipitation, storm intensities, types of use, volume and intensity of use, and a host of other factors affecting the ability of the trail substrate to resist erosion and provide a navigable surface. Trails that ascend steep slopes may use switchbacks, but switchback design and construction is a specialized topic.

Trails that are accessible by users with disabilities are mandated by the U.S. Federal Government to have slope of less than 12%, with no more than 30% of the trail having slope greater than 8.33%.

Trails outside of wilderness areas have outward side-to-side gradients less than 8%,. A flat or inward-sloping trail collects water and causes extra trail maintenance. The ideal path is built almost, but not quite, level in cross-section.

To achieve a proper slope in hilly terrain, a sidehill trail is excavated. This type of trailway is created by establishing a line of a suitable slope across a hillside, which is then dug out by means of a mattock or similar tool. This may be a full-bench trail, where the treadway is only on the firm ground surface after the overlying soil is removed and sidecast (thrown to the side as waste), or a half-bench trail, where soil is removed and packed to the side so that the treadway is half on firm old ground and half on new packed fill. In areas near drainages, creeks and other waterways, excavation spoils are taken away in bulk and deposited in an environmentally benign area. Trails are established entirely on fill in problem areas. In such cases, the soil is packed down firmly and the site is periodically checked to maintain the stability of the trail.

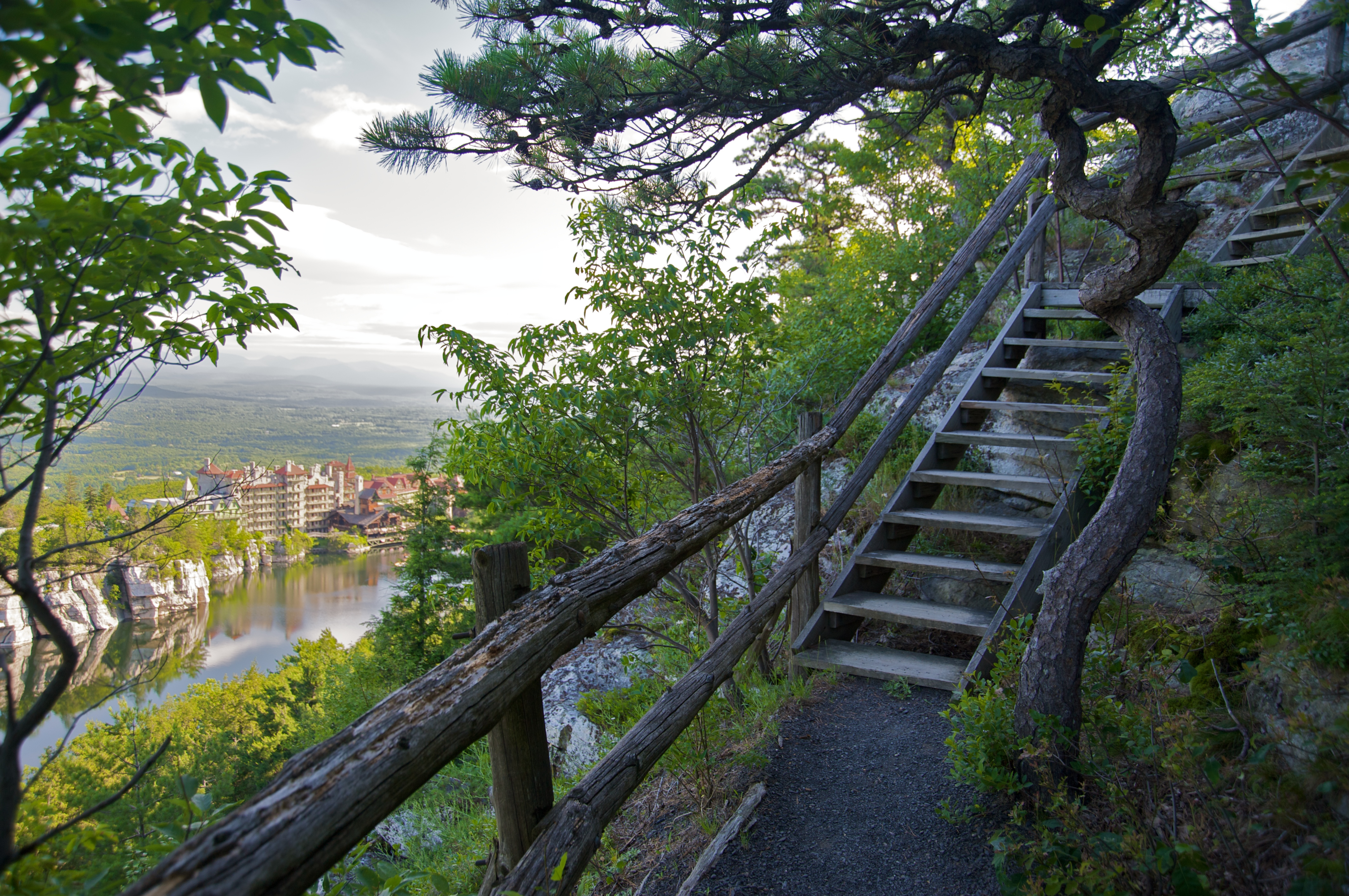
Parts of many hiking trails at Mohonk Mountain House include stairway trails

Cycle trails built for commuting may be built to a different set of standards than pedestrian-only trails and, in some cases, may require a harder surface, fewer changes in grade and slope, increased sight visibility, and fewer sharp changes in direction. On the other hand, the cross-slope of a bicycle trail may be significantly greater than a foot trail, and the path may be narrower in some cases. The American Association of State Highway and Transportation Officials recommends different widths for different types of bicycle facilities. For example, a shared use path has a recommended one directional width of 8 feet (2.44 m), while a bidirectional path should be significantly wider (10 to 12 feet or 3.05 to 3.66 metres) to accommodate bidirectional traffic and users. The US Department of Transportation provides additional guidance on recreational bicycle and pedestrian trail planning and design standards.

A well designed recreational mountain bike path for the exclusive use of bicycles has an average grade of less than 10% and generally follows a contour line, rather than straight downhill.

=== Drainage ===
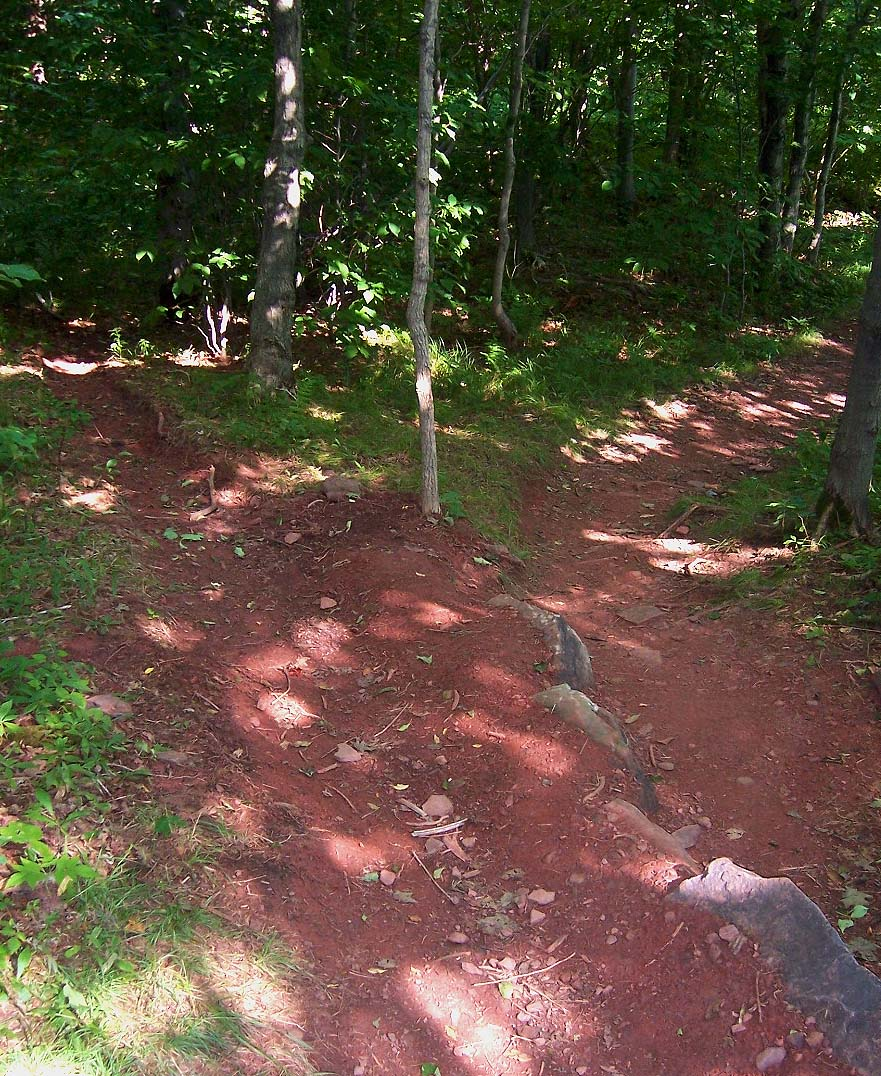
A waterbar in New York's Catskill Mountains. The trail forks right; the drainage ditch is to the left.

Trail construction requires proper drainage. If drainage is inadequate, three issues may occur: water may accumulate on flat terrain to the point that the trail becomes unusable; moving water can erode trails on slopes; or inadequate drainage may create local mud spots. Mountain bike trails slope out or across the trail 3–5% downhill to encourage water to run off the side, rather than down the trail bed.

To remedy the first problem, water accumulation on flat terrain, raised walkways are often built. They include turnpikes, causeways, embankments, stepping stones, and bridges (or deckwalks). The earthen approaches are often done by cutting poles from the woods, staking parallel poles in place on the ground, then filling between them with whatever material is available to create the raised walkway. The more elaborate option of the deckwalk is by necessity reserved for shorter stretches in very high-traffic areas. Water accumulation is particularly common in the North Country of England.

The second problem, water erosion, is caused because trails, by their nature, tend to become drainage channels and eventually gullies when the drainage is poorly controlled. Where a trail is near the top of a hill or ridge, this is usually a minor issue, but when it is farther down, it can become a very major one.

In areas of heavy water flow along a trail, a ditch is often dug on the uphill side of the trail with drainage points across the trail. The cross-drainage is also accomplished by means of culverts cleared on a semi-annual basis, or by means of cross-channels, often created by placing logs or timbers across the trail in a downhill direction, called "thank-you-marms", "deadmen", or waterbars. Timbers or rocks are also used for this purpose to create erosion barriers. Rock paving in the bottom of these channels and in the trailside ditches is sometimes used to maintain stability. The creation of water bars, with or without ditching, at major points of water flow on or along the trail, and in conjunction with existing drainage channels below the trail, is a technique that can be applied. Another technique that has been adopted is the construction of coweeta dips, or drain dips, points on the trail where it falls briefly (for a meter or so) and then rises again. These provide positive drainage points that are almost never clogged by debris.

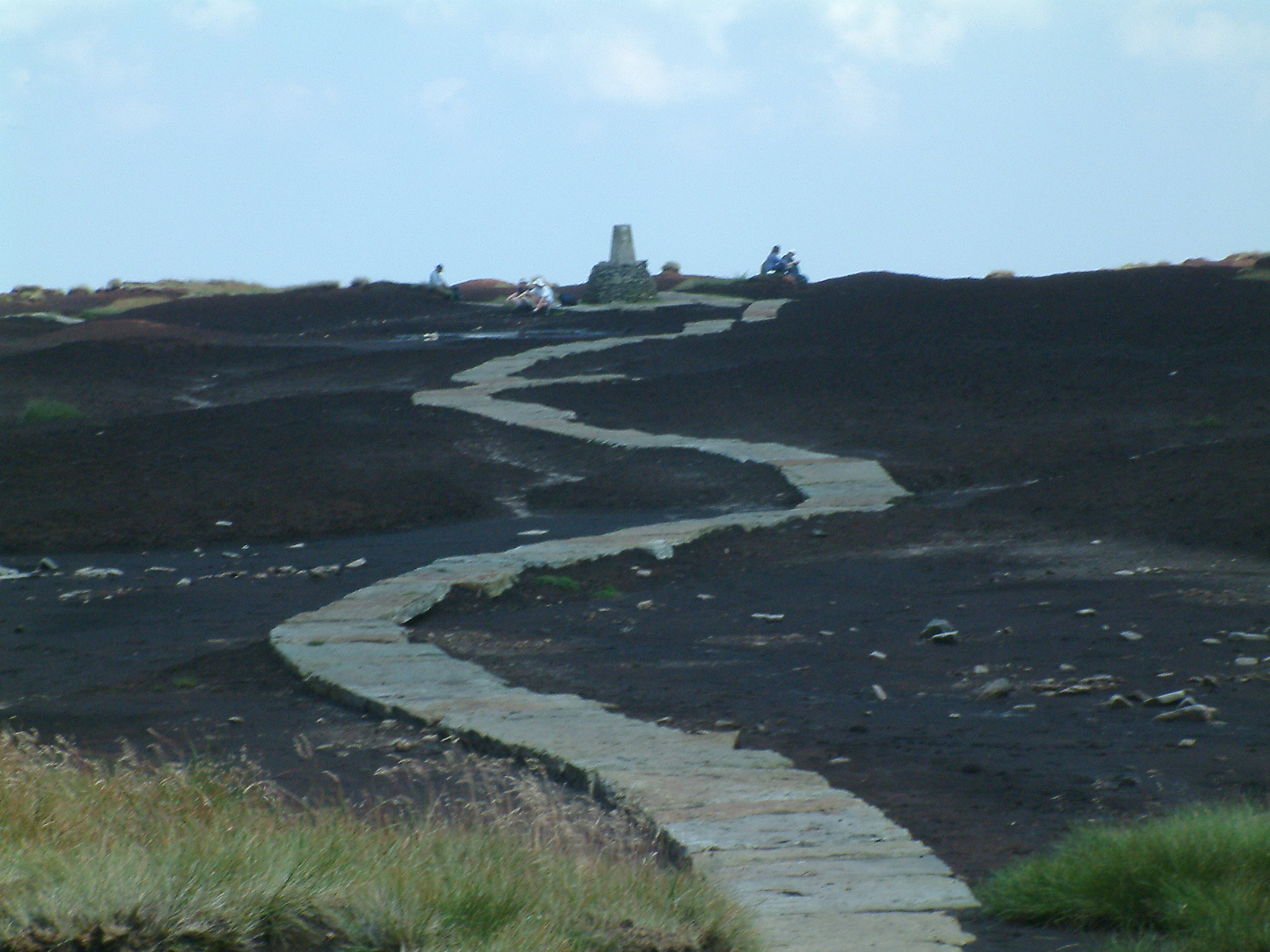
Black Hill (Peak District), Cheshire, England, where a stone path was laid across boggy ground

The third type of problem can occur both on bottomlands and on ridgetops and a variety of other spots. A local spot or short stretch of the trail may be chronically wet. If the trail is not directly on rock, then a mud pit forms. Trail users go to the side of the trail to avoid the mud pit, and the trail becomes widened. A "corduroy" is a technique used when an area cannot be drained. This ranges from random sticks to split logs being laid across the path. Some early turnpikes in the United States were corduroy roads, and these can still be found in third-world forested areas. With recreational trails, it is common for the sticks to be one to three inches thick and laid in place, close together. Sometimes, a short bridge is used.

=== Maintenance ===
Natural surface, single-track trails will require some ongoing maintenance. If the trail is properly designed and constructed, maintenance should be limited to clearing downed trees, trimming back brush and clearing drainages. Depending on location, if the trail is properly designed, there should be no need for major rework such as grading or erosion control efforts. Mountain trails which see both significant rainfall and human traffic may require "trail hardening" efforts to prevent further erosion. Most of the seemingly natural rock steps on the mountain trails of the northeast United States are the work of professional and volunteer trail crews.

=== Navigation ===
The most common symbols used in trail blazing in the US

For long-distance trails, or trails where there is any possibility of someone taking a wrong turn, blazing or signage is provided (the term waymarking is used in Britain). This is accomplished by using either paint on natural surfaces or by placing pre-made medallions or sometimes cairns. Horseshoe-shaped blazes are used frequently for bridle trails. The Appalachian Trail is blazed with white rectangles, and blue is often used for side trails. European long-distance walking paths are blazed with yellow points encircled with red. Other walking paths in European countries are blazed in a variety of manners.

Where bike trails intersect with pedestrian or equestrian trails, signage at the intersections and high visibility onto the intersecting trails are needed to prevent collisions between fast-moving cyclists and slower moving hikers and horses. Bicycles and horses can share the same trails where the trail is wide enough with good visibility. The US Department of Transportation provides standards and guidelines for traffic control, including signage and striping, for bicycle facilities.

=== Classification ===
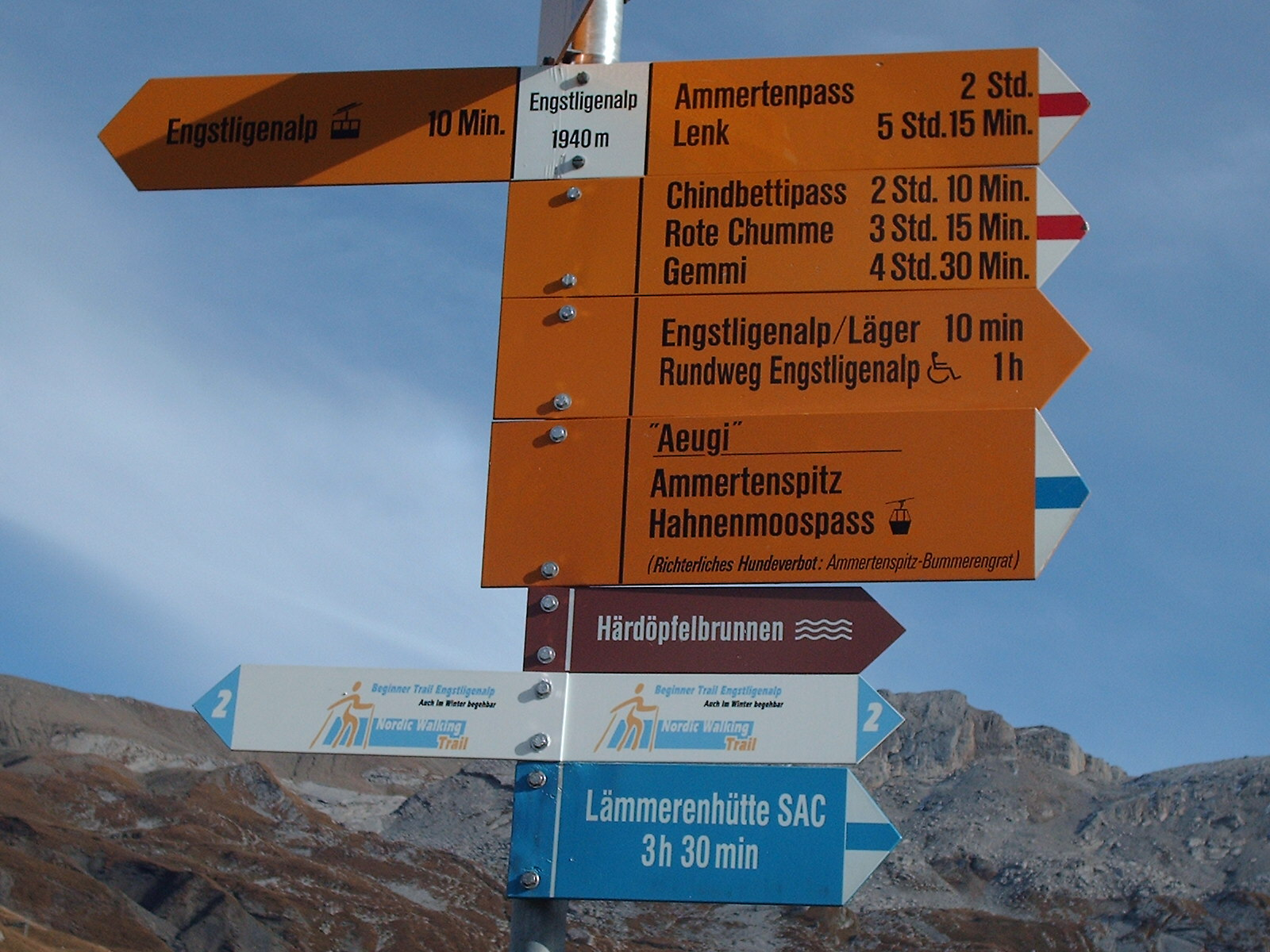
Swiss signs: hiking trails in yellow, mountain path in white-red-white, Alpine Route in white-blue-white

A simple colored symbol to classify a trail's difficulty in the USA was first used for ski trails and is now being used for hiking, bicycle, other trails.

- Green circle – easy
- Blue square – moderate
- Black diamond – difficult

Other systems may be used in different locations.

In Switzerland, paths are classified by three levels of difficulties: Hiking paths (yellow markers), mountain paths (white-red-white markers) and alpine paths (white-blue-white markers).

== See also ==
- Alpine route
- Exercise trail ("trim trail")
- Dirt road
- Boardwalk and Promenade
- Corpse road
- Desire path
- Educational trail
- Fastpacking
- Nature trail
- Trails created by insects
- Sculpture trail
- Steig
- Themed trail
- Trail difficulty rating system
- Trail ethics
- Trailhead
