= East Republican Street Stairway =

Stairs in Seattle, Washington, U.S.

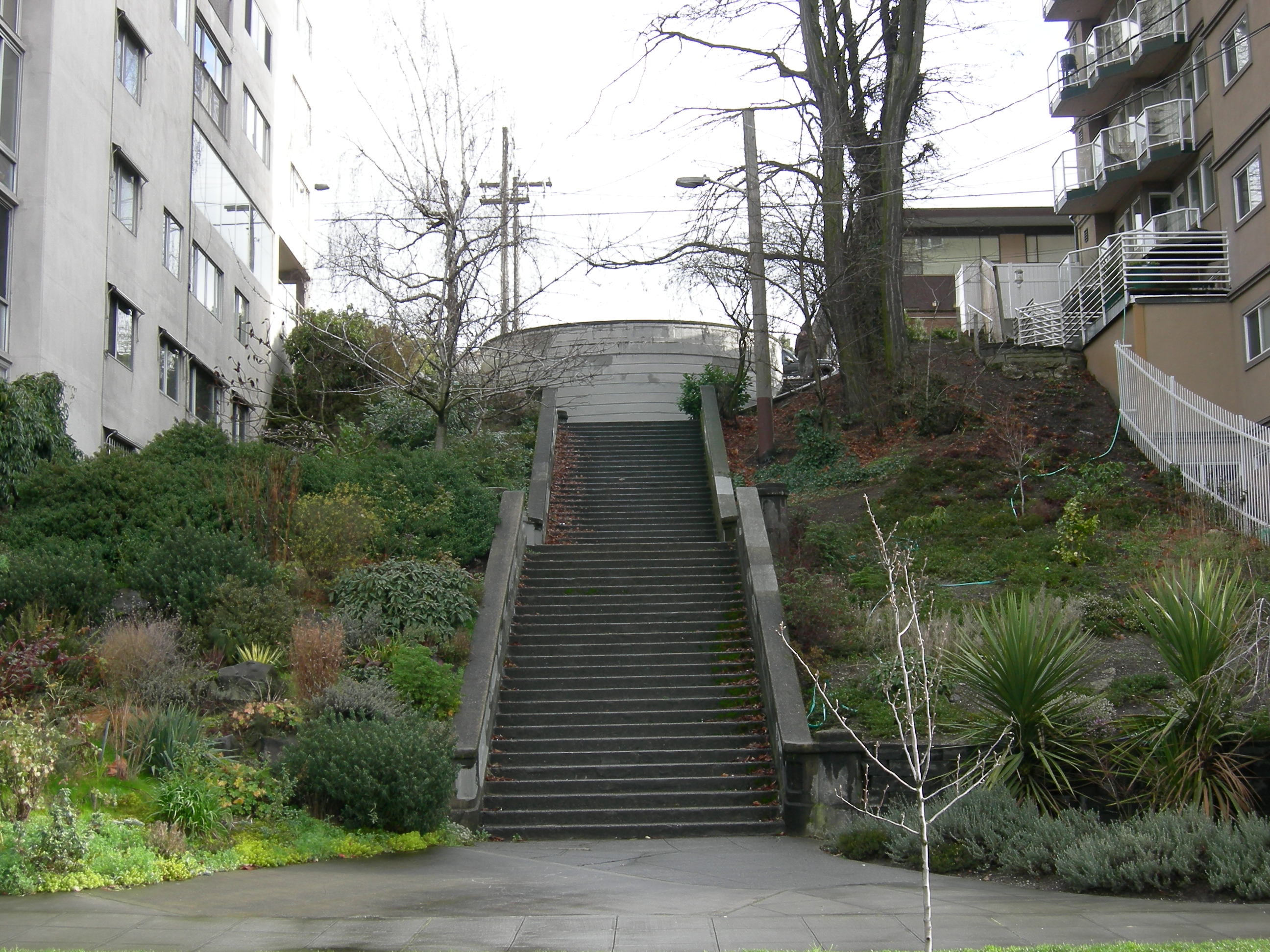
- The remaining stairway, 2008
- Location: Seattle, Washington, U.S.
- Location within Washington (state)
- Coordinates: 47°37′23.3″N 122°19′39.5″W

The East Republican Street Stairway is an outdoor stairway in Seattle, in the U.S. state of Washington. The remaining staircase is a remnant of the Republican Hill Climb, which was completed in February 1910 to connect the Cascade and Capitol Hill neighborhoods. Much of the climb was removed during the 1960s, for the construction of Interstate 5. The remaining stairs have been designated an official city landmark.

== See also ==
- List of Seattle landmarks
- Public stairways in Seattle
