= Waterbar =

Road construction feature that is used to prevent erosion

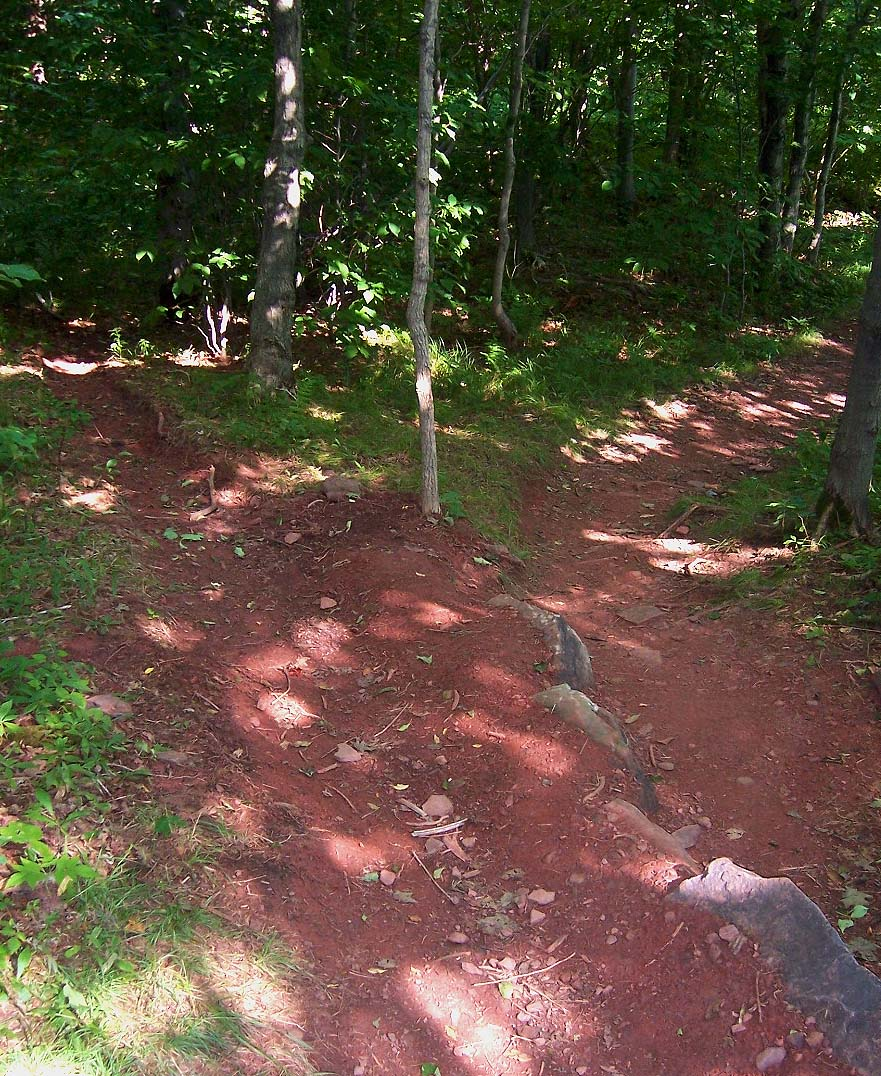
A water bar in the Catskills. The trail forks right; the drainage ditch to the left.

A water bar or interceptor dyke is a road or trail construction feature that is used to prevent erosion on sloping roads, cleared paths through woodland (for utility companies such as electricity pylons), or other accessways by reducing flow length. It is a diagonal channel across the road that diverts surface water (that would otherwise flow down the whole length of the road) off the road and into a stable drain way. By constructing a series of water bars at intervals along a road, the volume of water flowing down the road is reduced. Without water bars, flooding, washouts, and accelerated road degradation can occur.

The drain way carries the water that would otherwise be carried by the road. For proper operation of the water bars it must be stable and regularly inspected to ensure that it is free of silt buildup or other obstructions.

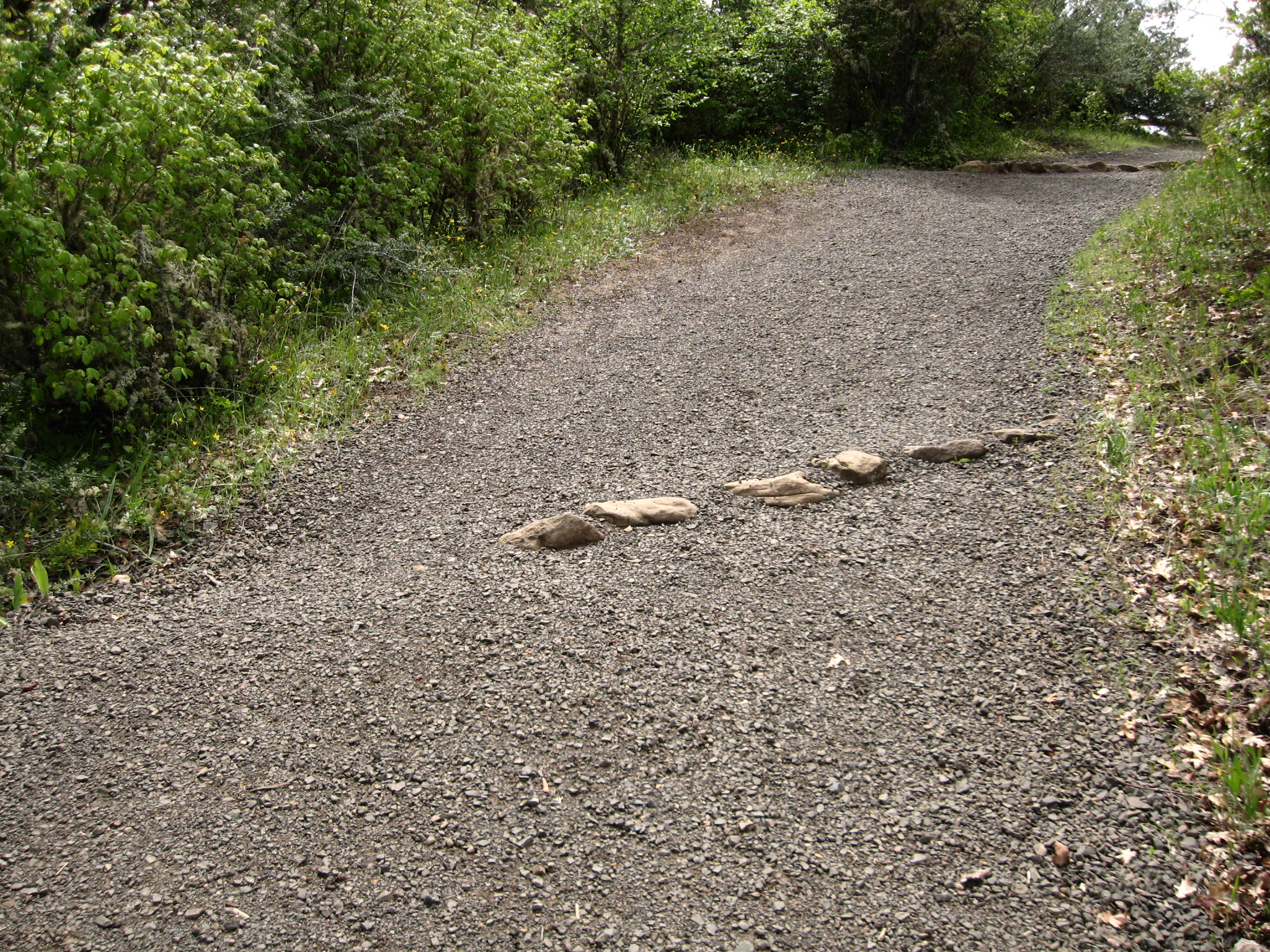
Water bar on Upper Table Rock in Southern Oregon

Water bars are usually constructed at an angle across the road. They tend to make passage by vehicle on the road difficult; usually a large high-clearance four wheel drive vehicle is required. Water bars are common on roads such as Forest Service Roads, especially in mountainous terrain with high rainfall.
