= Public stairways in Cincinnati =

Municipal stairway network in the U.S.

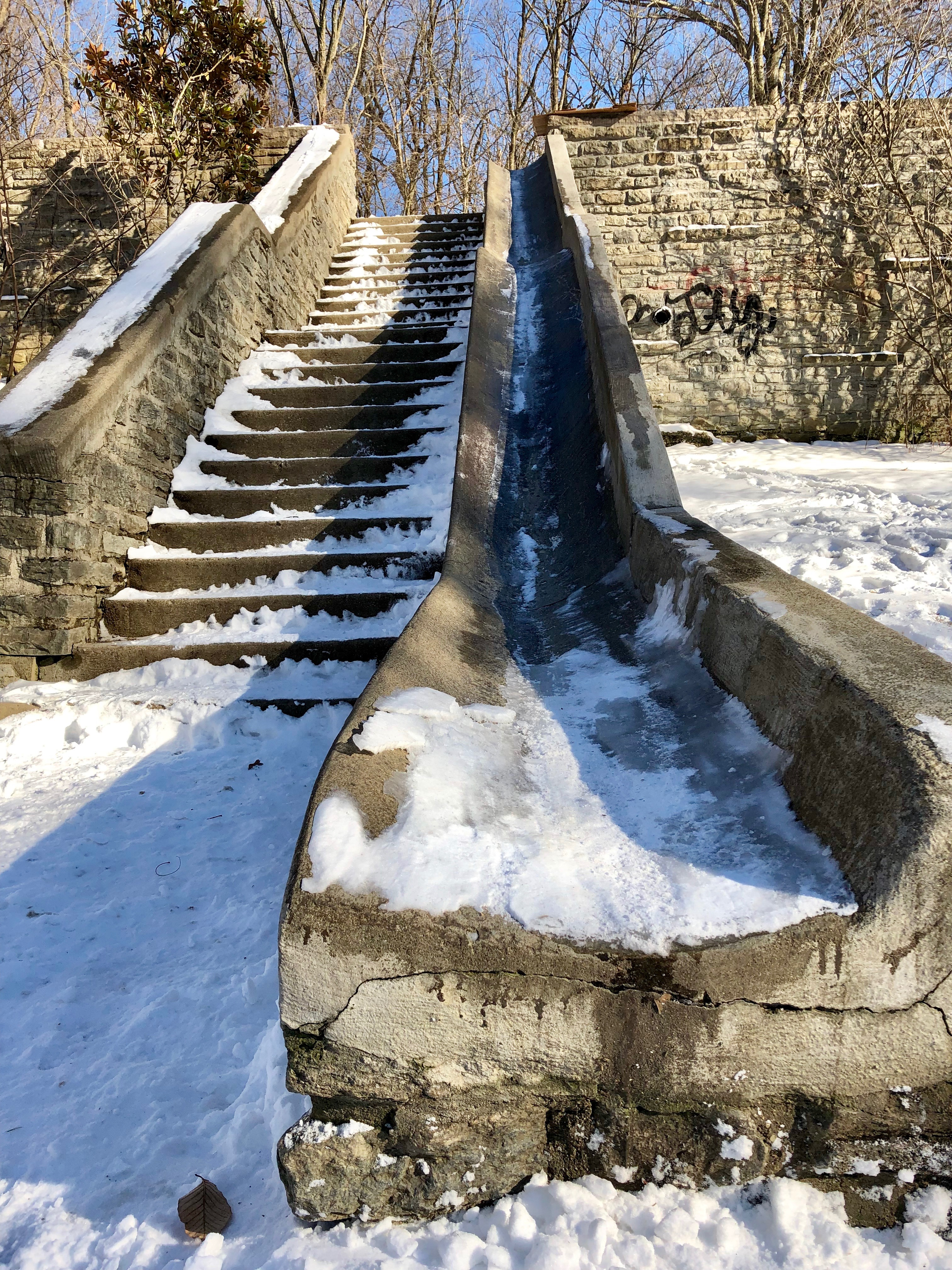
Stone slide and stairs in Burnet Woods

The city of Cincinnati, Ohio, United States, owns roughly 400 public stairways. These are an unusual and integral mode of transportation in the hilly city. In addition to practical use, the steps offer recreational users exercise and serve as a scenic attraction to tourists.

== Overview ==
Cincinnati has many hills, and was nicknamed "The City of Seven Hills" in reference to the seven hills of Rome. Before the advent of the automobile, the city's system of stairways provided pedestrians important and convenient access to and from their hilltop homes. At the height of their use in the 19th century, over 30 miles (48 km) of hillside steps connected the neighborhoods of Cincinnati to each other. The first steps were installed by residents of Mount Auburn in the 1830s in order to gain easier access to Findlay Market in Over-the-Rhine.

Over the years, some of the steps have fallen into disuse and disrepair, leading to calls from preservationists to restore the historic steps. Conversely, some area residents want nearby steps closed because they fear the often poorly lit steps offer refuge to criminals. In response, the City has formed the City Hillside Step Information System and made it responsible for evaluating the condition of the steps and making needed repairs. Commemorative markers were placed in the neighborhood of Mount Adams at the Oregon Street Steps and Park Street Steps. Despite these efforts, some of the steps remain at risk of closure.

== Religious significance ==
The Steps of Cincinnati are central to a Cincinnati tradition. Since 1860, the faithful ascend 85 steps of the Roman Catholic Immaculata Church on Good Friday to the church's front door from the neighborhood below while praying the Rosary. An additional 65 steps start at the base of Mt. Adams, with a pedestrian bridge over Columbia Parkway connecting the two paths. The steps were originally made of wood, but in 1911, the City of Cincinnati helped the church build concrete steps. In 1958 and 2009, the city again rebuilt the now 96 steps leading to the church.

== See also ==
- Public stairways in Pittsburgh
- Public stairways in Portland, Oregon
- Public stairways in Seattle
- Step street
