= Public stairways in Pittsburgh =

Municipal stairway network in the U.S.

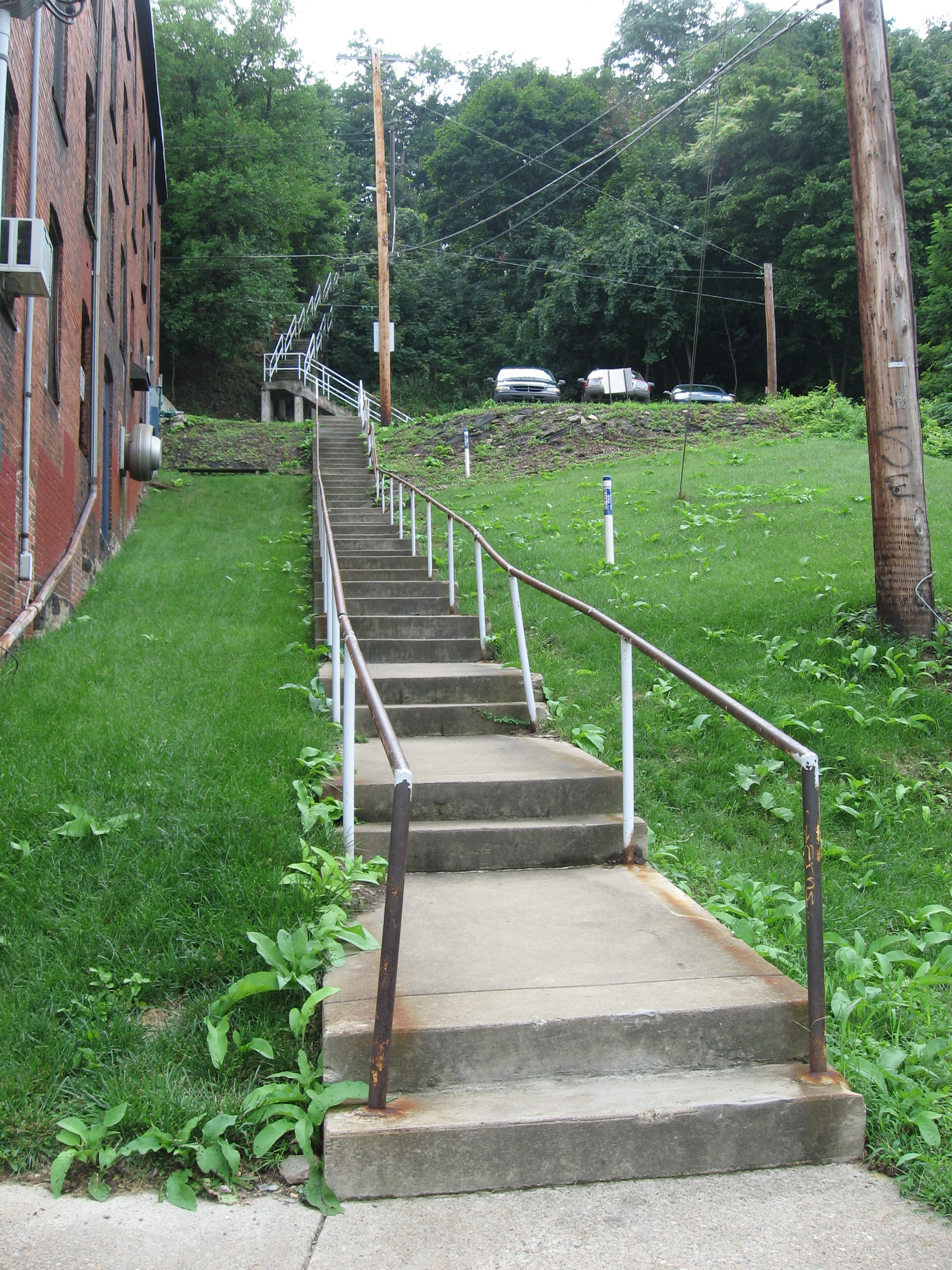
Typical steps in the South Side

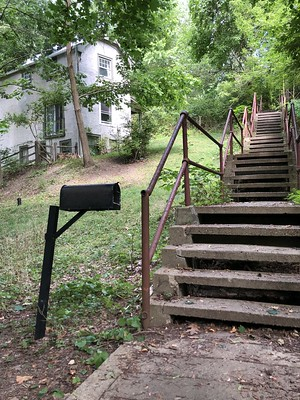
Pittsburgh "orphan" house with stairs-only access

Pittsburgh has nearly 800 sets of city-owned steps. Many steps parallel existing roads, but others exist on their own and are classified as city streets and are commonly referred to as "paper streets". Nearly two-thirds of the steps are in low or moderate-income areas. Approximately 450 sets of steps are built on structures and 350 are built into sidewalks, known as "jumperwalks".

The large number of steps are an engineering approach to the topography upon which the City of Pittsburgh is built. According to author Martin Aurand, Pittsburgh "lies unevenly on unruly land". The city is located at the confluence of two rivers which cut through elevated land of the Appalachian Plateau. The city is settled at elevations ranging from 710 to 1,300 feet (220 to 400 m) above sea level.

Steps have defined Pittsburgh to many of its visitors. Writing in 1937, war correspondent Ernie Pyle wrote of the steps of Pittsburgh:

And then the steps. Oh Lord, the steps! I was told they actually had a Department of Steps. That isn't exactly true, although they do have an Inspector of Steps. But there are nearly 15 miles of city-owned steps, going up mountainsides.

Pittsburgh's steps were cataloged by author and University of Pittsburgh professor Bob Regan in the late 1990s and early 2000s. He located and documented 739 individual sets of steps, including 44,645 risers, accounting for 24,108 vertical feet. Regan's first book was published by The Local History Company in 2004 and is currently out of print. The second edition, published by Globe Pequot, appeared in 2015 and contains updated content and photographs including a full Appendix that provides the location, steps count, and construction year for each flight. In 2017, The City of Pittsburgh's Department of Mobility and Infrastructure utilized Regan's data to form the basis of the current "City Steps Plan" which is used to determine how public stairways are cared for and remediated by the city. City Steps of Pittsburgh: A History & Guide, with a foreword by Regan, was released in 2024.

== See also ==
- Alley
- Public stairways in Cincinnati
- Public stairways in Portland, Oregon
- Public stairways in Seattle
- Step street
