= Public stairways in Seattle =

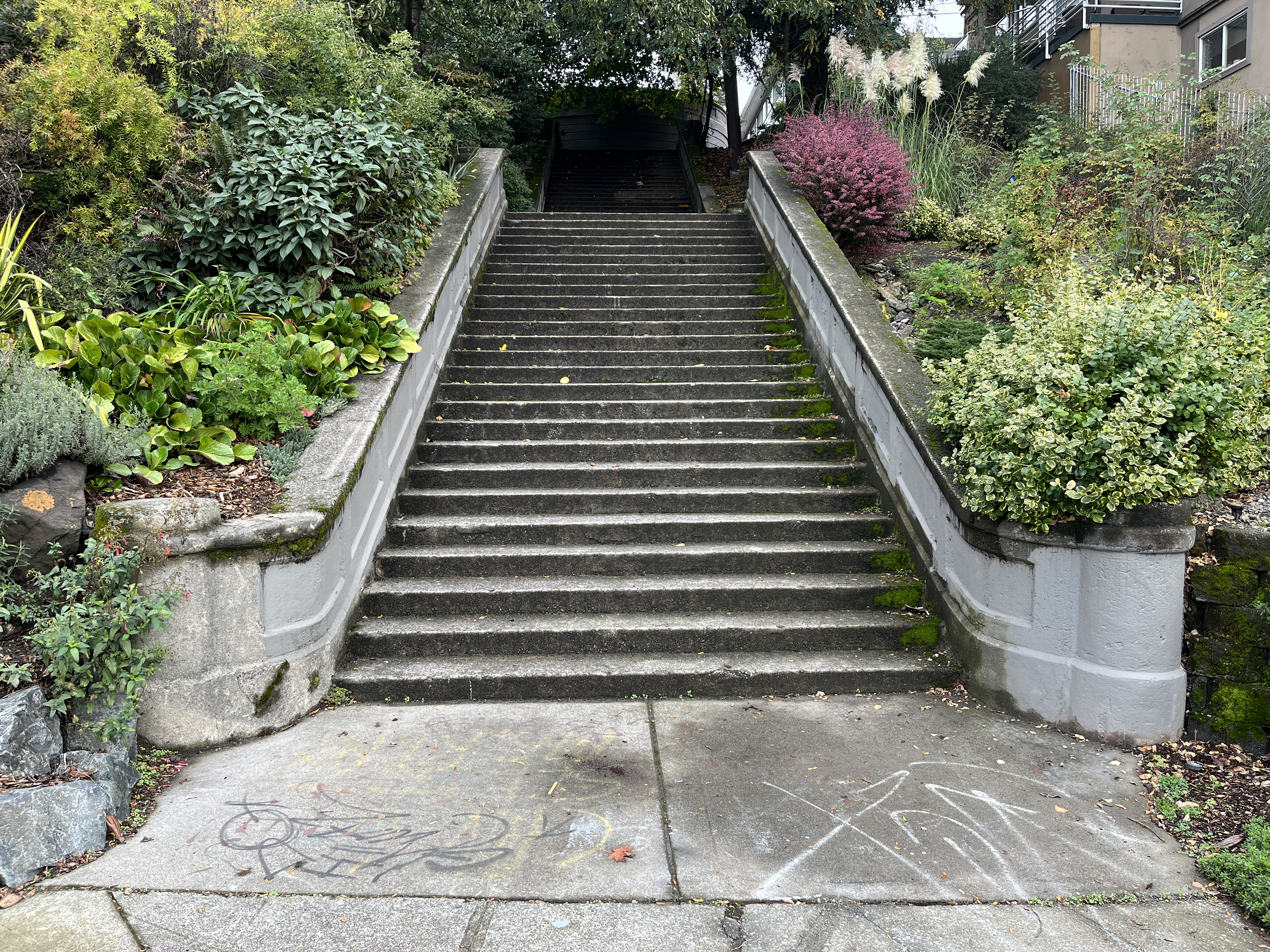
East Republican Street Stairway, 2023

There are approximately 650 public stairways in the American city of Seattle, Washington.

Notable stairways include the Blaine Street Stairs, the Harbor Steps, the Howe Street Stairs, and the Pike Street Hill Climb. There are many public stairways on Queen Anne Hill. The East Republican Street Stairway, an official city landmark, is a remnant of a longer series of stairways connecting the Cascade neighborhood to Capitol Hill, the rest of which was lost to the construction of Interstate 5.

== See also ==
- Public stairways in Cincinnati
- Public stairways in Pittsburgh
- Public stairways in Portland, Oregon
- Transportation in Seattle
