= Public stairways in Portland, Oregon =

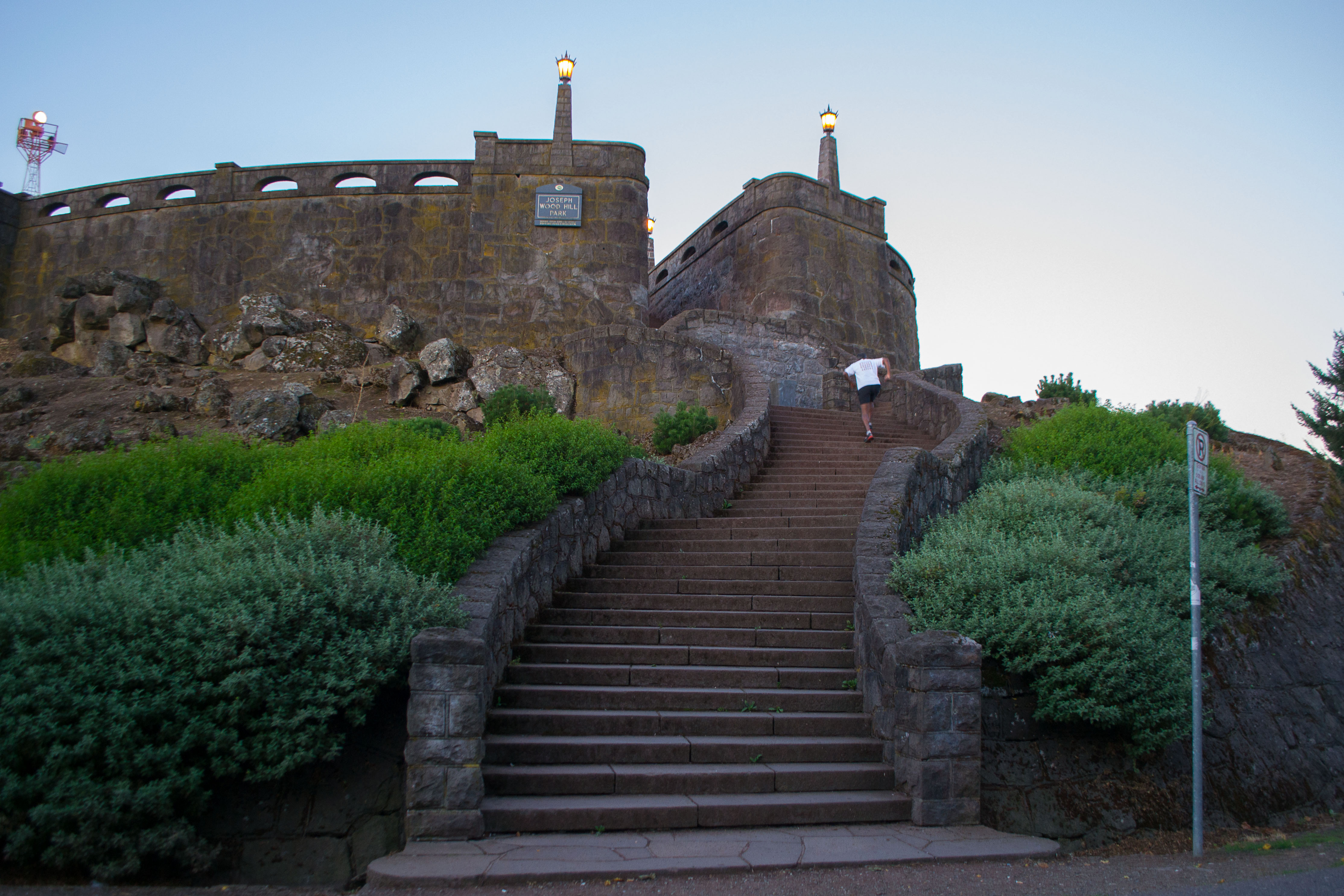
Steps at the entrance to Rocky Butte, 2013

There are at least 200 public stairways in the American city of Portland, Oregon. Popular stairways include one with 41 steps under the St. Johns Bridge at Cathedral Park, another in Mt. Scott, the entrance to Rocky Butte, and the Taylors Ferry climb. The Small Summit staircase has 73 steps and a water trough.

The guide book Portland's Little Red Book of Stairs was originally published in the 1980s and documents stairways.

== See also ==
- Public stairways in Cincinnati
- Public stairways in Pittsburgh
- Public stairways in Seattle
- Transportation in Portland, Oregon
