= Footpath =

Thoroughfare for pedestrians

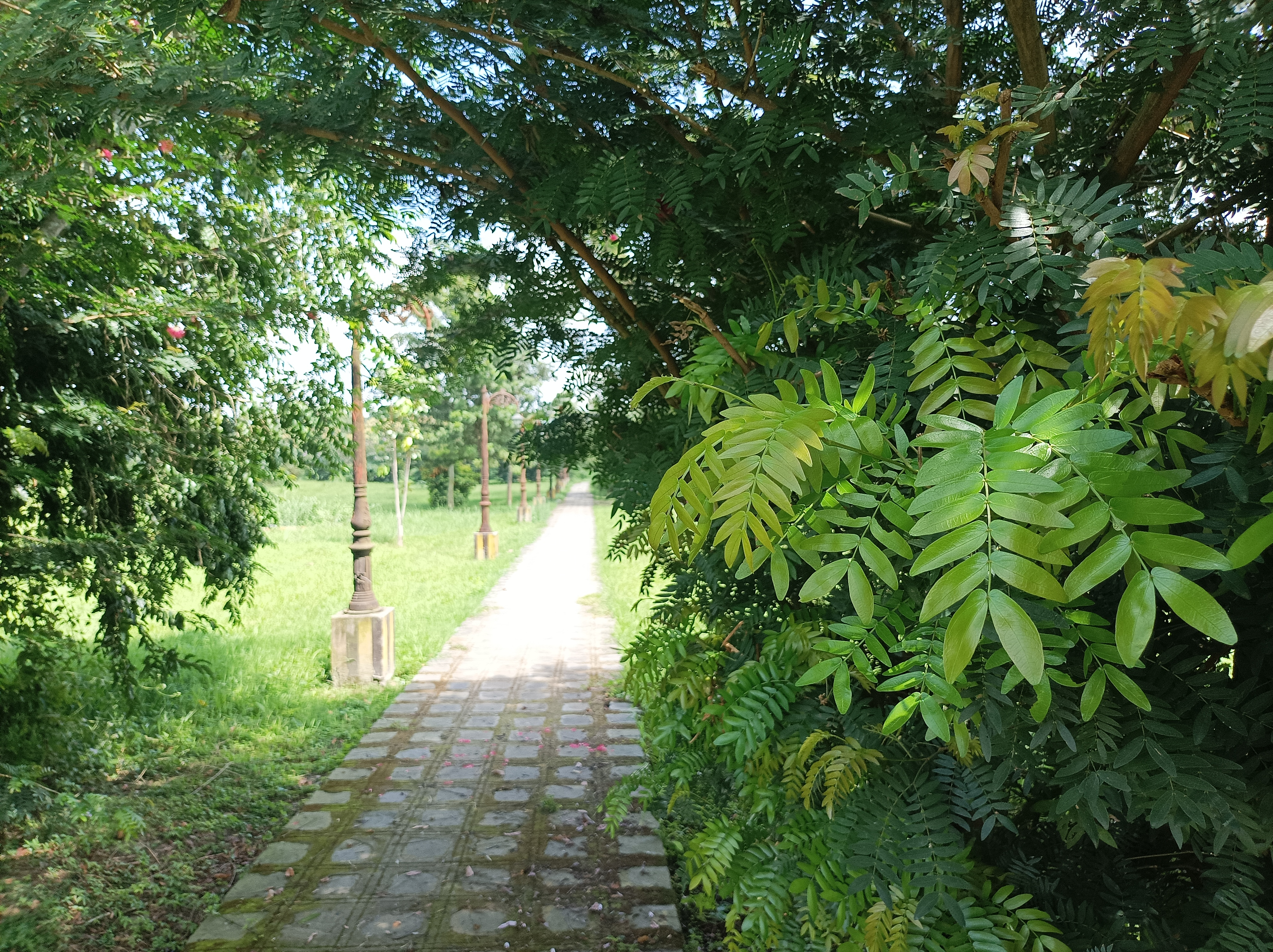
Footpath inside the Kangla Fort, Imphal

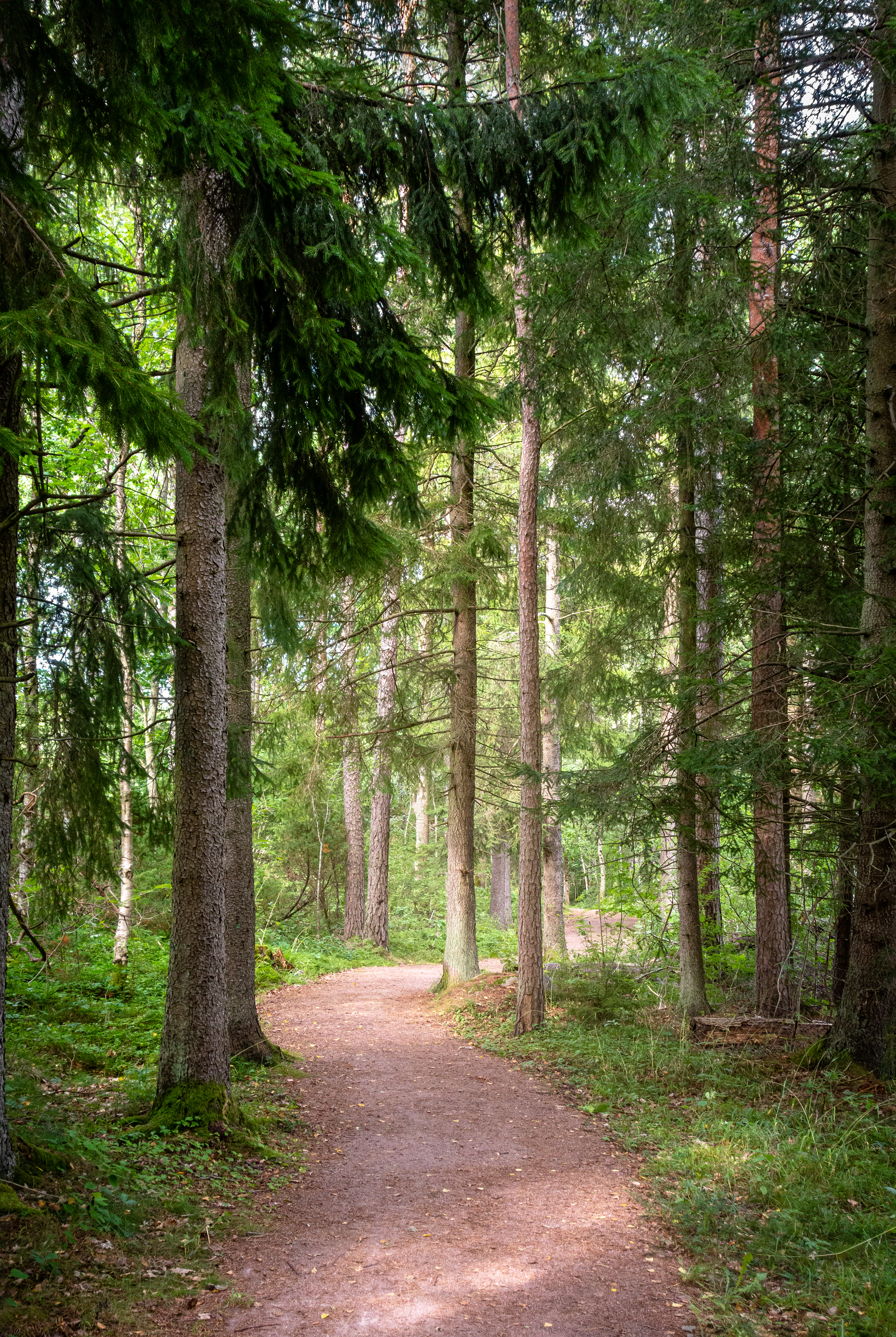
Footpath through the forest in Brastad, Sweden

A footpath is a type of thoroughfare, walking trail, or nature trail that is intended for use only by pedestrians and not by other forms of traffic such as motor vehicles, bicycles and horses. They can be found in a wide variety of places, from city centers to suburbs, highways, public parks, farmlands, mountain ridges, National parks, nature preserves, conservation areas and other protected wilderness areas. Urban footpaths are usually paved, may have steps, and can be called alleys, lanes, steps, etc.

The term "footpath" also refers to pedestrian walkways that are parallel to roads and separated from motor vehicles by a curb in Australian, Indian, Irish and New Zealand English. Such roadside footpath is also known as a pavement in British English and South African English, or a sidewalk in North American English.

== Origins and history ==
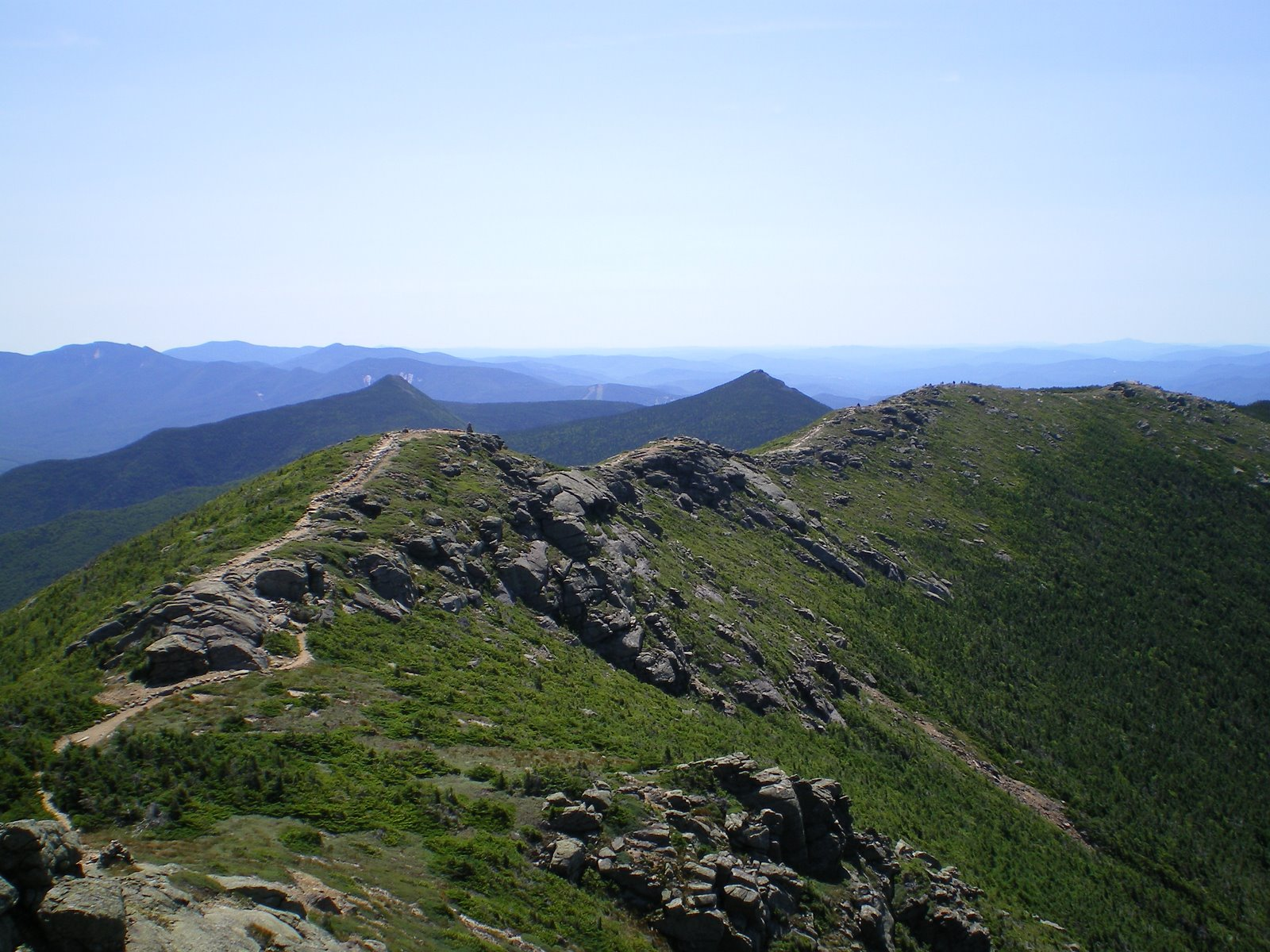
A footpath along the Franconia Ridge, Appalachian Trail, New Hampshire, US

Public footpaths are rights of way originally created by people walking across the land to work, market, the next village, church, and school. This includes mass paths and corpse roads. Some footpaths were also created by those undertaking a pilgrimage. Examples of the latter are the Pilgrim's Way in England and Pilgrim's Route (St. Olav's Way or the Old Kings' Road) in Norway. Some landowners allow access over their land without dedicating a right of way. These permissive paths are often indistinguishable from normal paths, but they are usually subject to restrictions. Such paths are often closed at least once a year, so that a permanent right of way cannot be established in law.

A mass path is a pedestrian track or road connecting destinations frequently used by rural communities, most usually the destination of Sunday Mass. They were most common during the centuries that preceded motorised transportation in Western Europe, and in particular the British Isles and the Netherlands (where such a path is called "kerkenpad" (lit. Church path). Mass paths typically included stretches crossing fields of neighboring farmers and were likely to contain stiles when crossing fences or other boundaries, or plank footbridges to cross ditches. Some mass paths are still used today in the Republic of Ireland, but are usually subject to Ireland's complicated rights of way law.

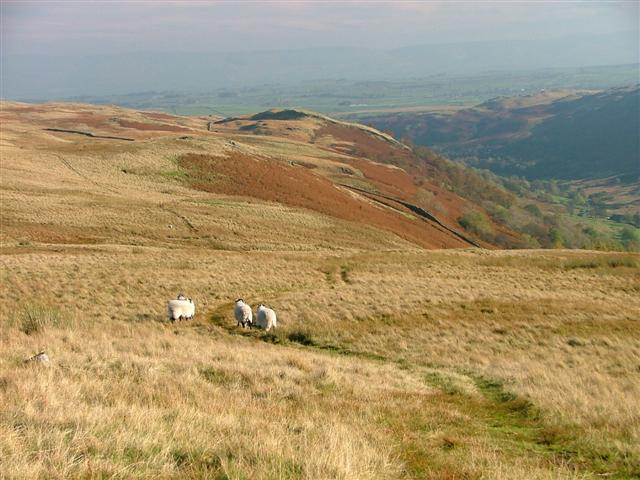
Corpse road in the English Lake District

Corpse roads provided a practical means for transporting corpses, often from remote communities, to cemeteries that had burial rights, such as parish churches and chapels of ease. In Great Britain, such routes can also be known by a number of other names: bier road, burial road, coffin road, coffin line, lyke or lych way, funeral road, procession way, corpse way, etc.

Nowadays footpaths are mainly used for recreation and have been frequently linked together, along with bridle paths and newly created footpaths, to create long-distance trails. Also, organizations have been formed in various countries to protect the right to use public footpaths, including the Ramblers Association and the Open Spaces Society in England. Footpaths are now also found in botanic gardens, arboretums, regional parks, conservation areas, wildlife gardens, and open-air museums. There are also educational trails, themed walks, sculpture trails and historic interpretive trails.

== Rights of way ==
In England and Wales, public footpaths are rights of way on which pedestrians have a legally protected right to travel. Other public rights of way in England and Wales, such as bridleways, byways, towpaths, and green lanes are also used by pedestrians. In Scotland there is no legal distinction between a footpath and a bridleway and it is generally accepted that cyclists and horse riders may follow any right of way with a suitable surface. The law is different in both Northern Ireland and the Republic of Ireland and there are far fewer rights of way in Ireland as a whole (see Keep Ireland Open).

=== Definitive path maps ===
Footpaths and other rights of way in England and Wales are shown on definitive maps. A definitive map is a record of public rights of way in England and Wales. In law it is the definitive record of where a right of way is located. The highway authority (normally the county council, or unitary authority in areas with a one-tier system) has a statutory duty to maintain a definitive map, though in national parks the national park authority usually maintains the map. The Inner London boroughs are exempt from the statutory duty though they have the powers to maintain a map: currently none does so.

Currently, the number of footpaths in the UK totals 427,301 (around 81% of all rights of way) with a net combined route length of 105,125 miles (169,182 km).

In Scotland different legislation applies and there is no legally recognised record of rights of way. However, there is a National Catalogue of Rights of Way (CROW), compiled by the Scottish Rights of Way and Access Society (Scotways), in partnership with Scottish Natural Heritage, and the help of local authorities.

=== Open Spaces Society ===
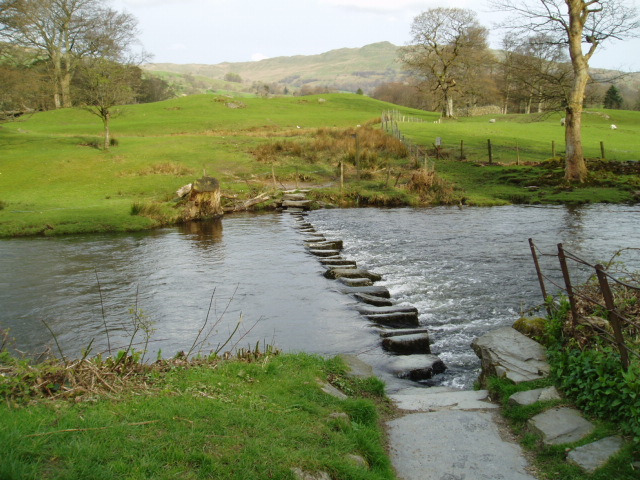
Stepping stones in the River Rothay, Lake District, England.

The Open Spaces Society is a charitable British organisation that works to protect public rights of way and open spaces in the United Kingdom, such as common land and village greens. It is Britain's oldest national conservation body. The society was founded as the Commons Preservation Society and merged with the National Footpaths Society in 1899, and adopted its present name.

Much of the Open Spaces Society's work is concerned with the preservation and creation of public paths. Before the introduction of definitive maps of public paths in the early 1950s, the public did not know where paths were, and the Open Spaces Society helped the successful campaign for paths to be shown on Ordnance Survey maps. It advises the Department for Environment, Food and Rural Affairs and National Assembly for Wales on applications for works on common land. Local authorities are legally required to consult the society whenever there is a proposal to alter the route of a public right of way.

The Ramblers are another British organisation concerned with the protection of footpaths.

== Urban footpaths ==
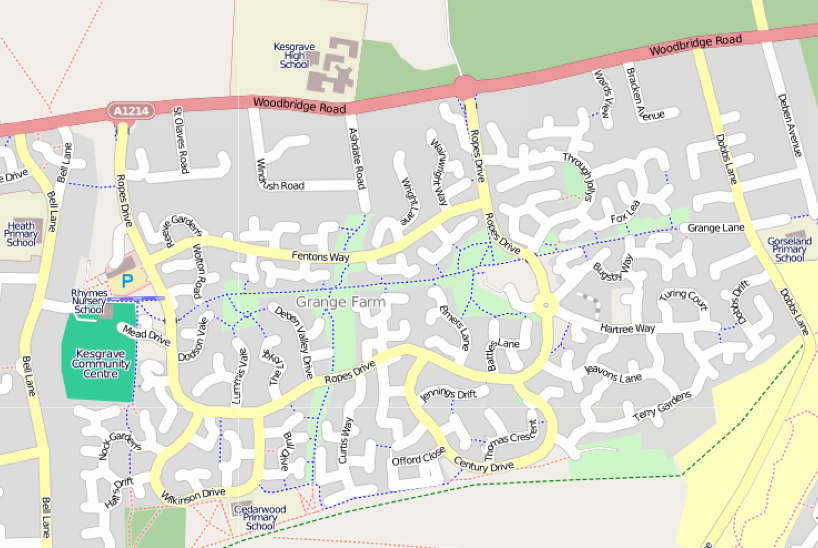
A map which shows a network of paths (dotted blue) created in the town of Kesgrave, Suffolk, England, for walkers and cyclists

There are a variety of footpaths in urban settings, including paths along streams and rivers, through parks and across commons. Another type is the alley, normally providing access to the rear of properties or connecting built-up roads not easily reached by vehicles. Towpaths are another kind of urban footpath, but they are often shared with cyclists. A typical footpath in a park is found along the seawall in Stanley Park, Vancouver, British Columbia, Canada. This is a segregated path, with one lane for skaters and cyclists and the other for pedestrians.

In the US and Canada, where urban sprawl has begun to strike even the most rural communities, developers and local leaders are currently striving to make their communities more conducive to non-motorized transportation through the use of less traditional paths. The Robert Wood Johnson Foundation has established the Active Living by Design program to improve the livability of communities in part through developing trails, The Upper Valley Trails Alliance has done similar work on traditional trails, while the Somerville Community Path and related paths, are examples of urban initiatives. In St. John's, Newfoundland, Canada The Grand Concourse, is an integrated walkway system that has over 160 kilometers (99 mi) of footpaths which link every major park, river, pond, and green space in six municipalities.

In London, England, there are several long-distance walking routes which combine footpaths and roads to link green spaces. These include the Capital Ring, London Outer Orbital Path and the Jubilee Walkway, the use of which have been endorsed by Transport for London.

=== Alley and steps ===
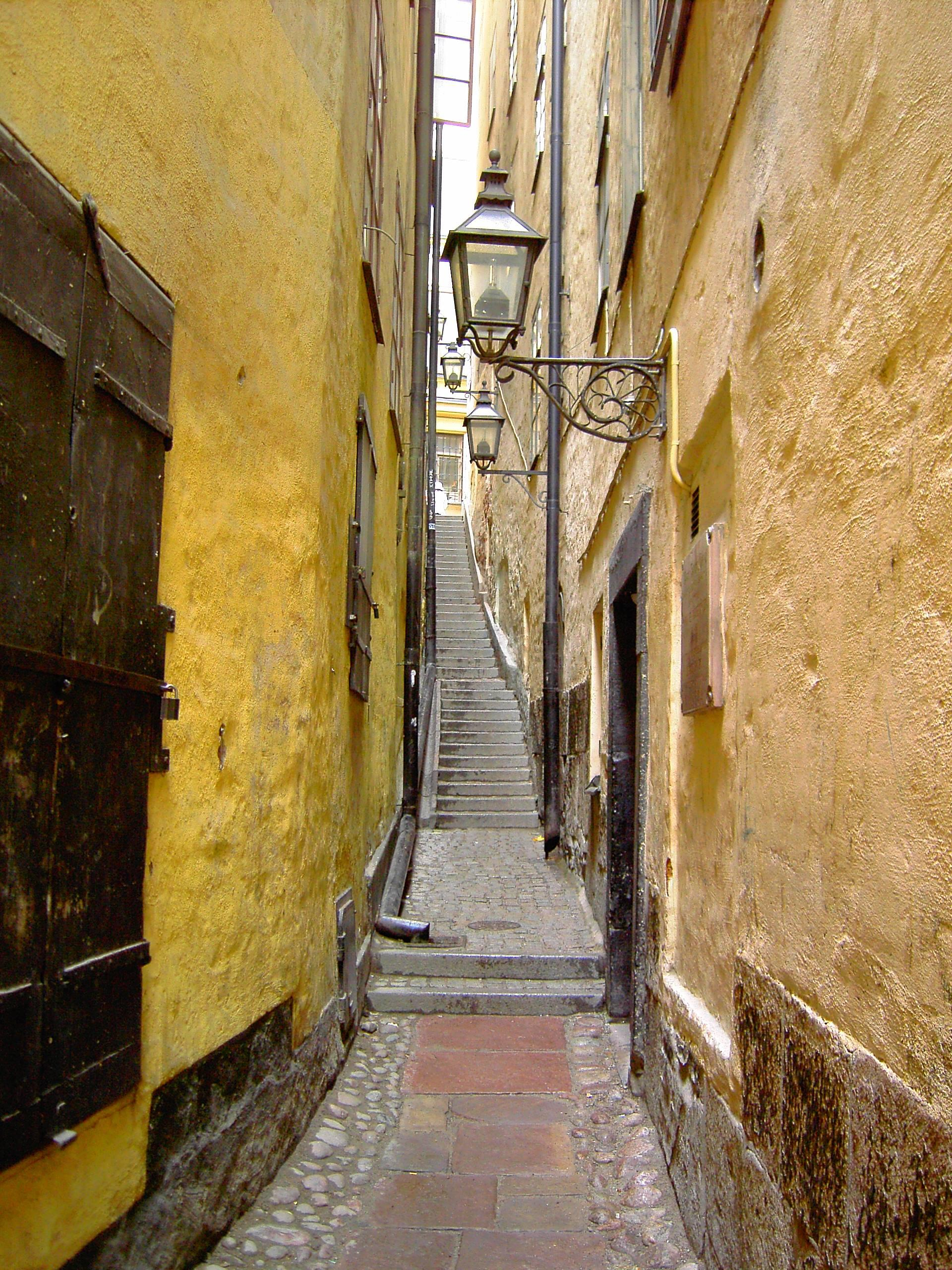
A typical urban footpath: Mårten Trotzigs Gränd, 90 cm (3.0 ft) wide, the narrowest alley in Gamla stan, Stockholm, Sweden

An alley is a narrow, usually paved, pedestrian path, often between the walls of buildings in towns and cities. This type is usually short and straight, and on steep ground can consist partially or entirely of steps. In older cities and towns in Europe, alleys are often what is left of a medieval street network, or a right of way or ancient footpath. Similar paths also exist in some older North American towns and cities. In some older urban development in North America lanes at the rear of houses, to allow for deliveries and garbage collection, are called alleys. Alleys may be paved, or unpaved, and a blind alley is a cul-de-sac. Some alleys are roofed because they are within buildings, such as the traboules of Lyon, or when they are a pedestrian passage through railway embankments in Britain. The latter follow the line of rights-of way that existed before the railway was built.

Because of geography, stairs are a common form of footpath in hilly cities and towns. This includes those in Pittsburgh, Cincinnati, Seattle, Portland, Oregon, and San Francisco in the United States, as well as Hong Kong, Quebec City, Quebec, Canada, and Rome. Stairway trails are found in a number of hilly American cities. This includes the Stairway Trails in Bernal Heights, East San Francisco.

== Long-distance paths ==
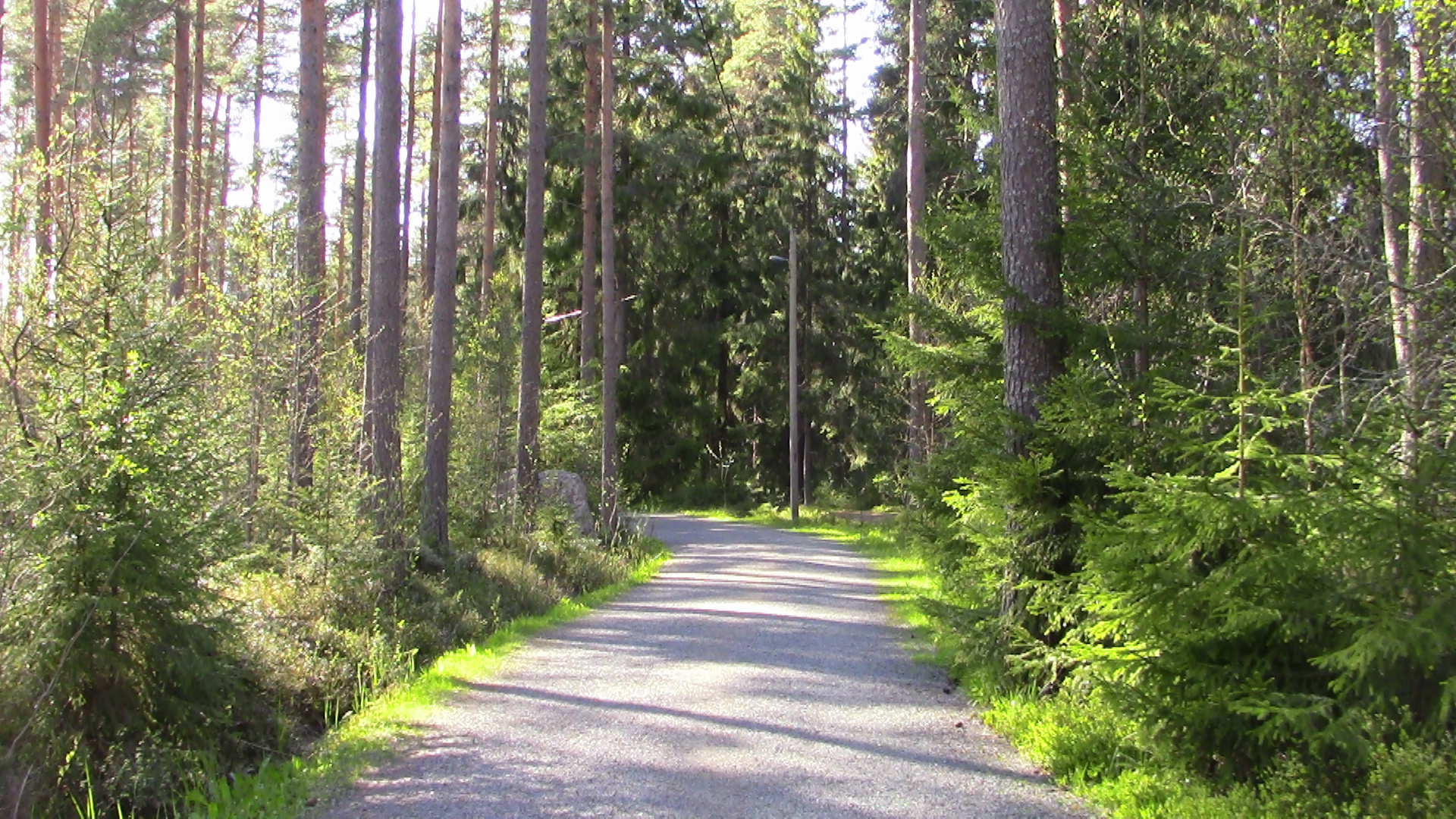
Jogging path in Pori, Finland

Footpaths (and other rights of way) have been combined, and new paths created, so as to produce long-distance walking routes in a number of countries. These can be rural in nature, such as the Essex Way, in southern England, which crosses farmland, or urban as with various routes in London, England, or along a coastline like the South West Coast Path in the West of England, or in the high mountains, like the Pacific Crest Trail in the US, which reaches 13,153 feet (4,009 m) (Note: Sources disagree on Forester Pass's elevation. The Forest Service claims 13,180 feet (4,017 m) while the USGS says 13,153 feet (4,009 m), but topographic maps showing 36.6941°N 118.3720°W indicate a little less than 13,123 feet (4,000 m).) at Forester Pass in the Sierra Nevada.

== Maintenance ==
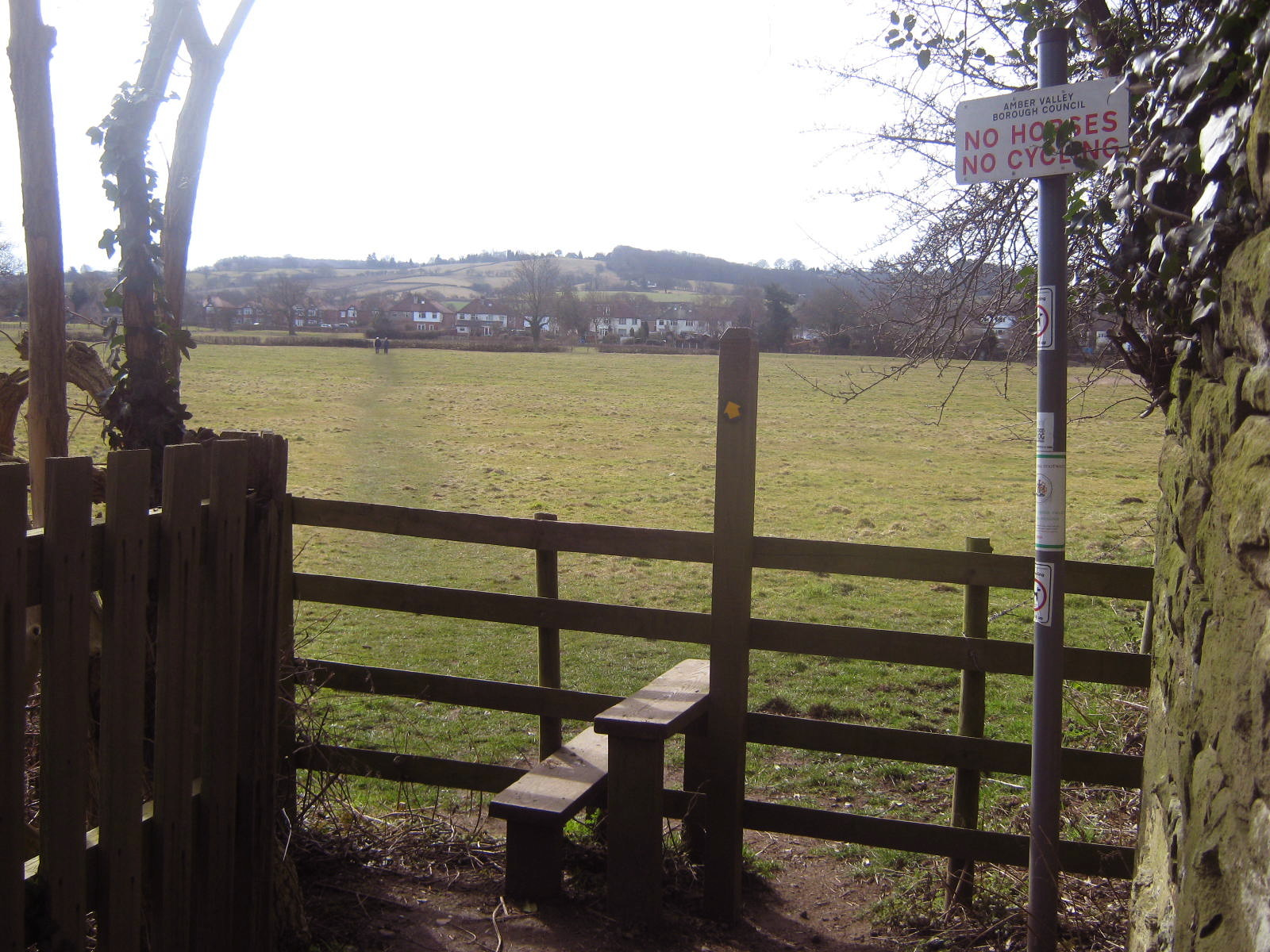
A rural footpath with a stile in Derbyshire, England

Many footpaths require some maintenance. Most rural paths have an earth or grass surface with stiles, and/or gates, including kissing gates. A few will have stepping stones, fords, or bridges.

Urban footpaths may be constructed of masonry, brick, concrete, asphalt, cut stone or wood boardwalk. Crushed rock, decomposed granite, fine wood chips are also used. The construction materials can vary over the length of the footpath and may start with a well-constructed hard surface in an urban area, and end with an inexpensive soft or loose surface in the countryside.

Stairs or steps are sometimes found in urban alleys, or cliff paths to beaches.

== Issues ==
The main issues in urban areas include maintenance, litter, crime, and lighting after dark. In the countryside there are issues relating to conflicts between walkers and livestock, and these occasionally result in people being injured or even killed. Dogs often contribute to such conflicts – see in England and Wales The Dogs (Protection of Livestock) Act 1953. Also footpaths in remote locations can be difficult to maintain and a route along a country path can be impeded by ploughing, crops, overgrown vegetation, illegal barriers (including barbed wire), damaged stiles, etc.

=== Confrontation with landowners in the UK ===
There have been numerous problems over the years in England and Wales with landowners.

One notable example was with the millionaire property tycoon Nicholas Van Hoogstraten who had a long-standing dislike of and dispute with ramblers, describing them as "scum of the earth". In 1999 Hoogstraten erected a large fence across a footpath on his country estate in East Sussex. Local ramblers staged a protest against the erection of the fence outside the boundary of Van Hoogstraten's estate. On 10 February 2003 and after a 13-year battle and numerous legal proceedings, the path was finally re-opened.

==== Isle of Man ====
Another conflict involved Jeremy Clarkson, a TV presenter and Top Gear host who lives on the Isle of Man. He became frustrated at the lack of privacy at his home when ramblers deviated from a pathway to take photographs of his dwelling. Clarkson's property bordered a small 250-metre strip of land that had no definitive status as a public right of way but was used by walkers regardless. Clarkson aimed to close access to this small strip of his land, thereby forcing ramblers to take a small diversion to stick to the official public right of way and therefore protecting his claimed right to privacy on his own property. In May 2010 the former transport minister, Hon. David Anderson MHK, accepted the conclusions of a public inquiry that all except five of the paths claimed at the inquiry as public rights of way have been dedicated as public rights of way and should be added to the definitive map.

== See also ==
- Ancient trackway
- Desire path
- Drovers road
- Footpaths of Gibraltar
- Ginnel
- Hiking
- Pedestrian village
- Pedestrian zone
- Pend
- Rail trail
- Sunken road
- Walkability
