= Byways and Bridleways Trust =

Body for rights of way in England and Wales

The Byways and Bridleways Trust (BBT) is a charity (registered number 280214 in 1980) which exists to protect bridleways and byways in England and Wales. It is a prescribed consultee for proposed changes or effects on public rights of way (minor highways) made under the Highways Act 1980, Wildlife and Countryside Act 1981 and Town and Country Planning Act 1990. As such, the Trust responds to consultations from government, government agencies, local authorities and potential applicants for planning permission and changes to public rights of way. The Trust takes the opportunity where presented to respond to Parliamentary calls for evidence such as on the Marine Bill The Trust's aim is:

To protect, preserve, maintain, secure, improve and develop public rights of way for the benefit of the public at large, so that the conditions of life may be improved, in particular by taking steps to ensure high standards of surveying and recording on definitive maps and any other public records of public rights of way over byways open to all traffic, roads used as public paths, unmetalled carriageways, green lanes, drove roads, driftways and bridleways in England and Wales.

The Definitive Map and Statement is the legally conclusive record of public rights of way maintained by highway authorities as required by Section 27 of the National Parks and Access to the Countryside Act 1949.
