= Dirt road =

Unpaved road made from the land's native material

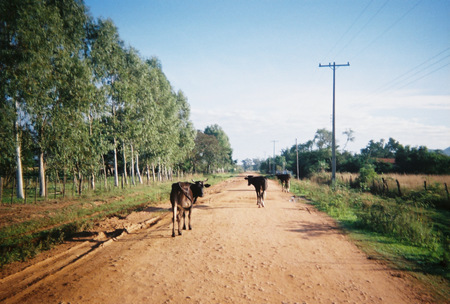
Cattle on a dirt road in Paraguay.

A dirt road or dirt track is a type of unpaved road not paved with asphalt, concrete, brick, or stone; made from the native material of the land surface through which it passes, known to highway engineers as subgrade material.

== Terminology ==
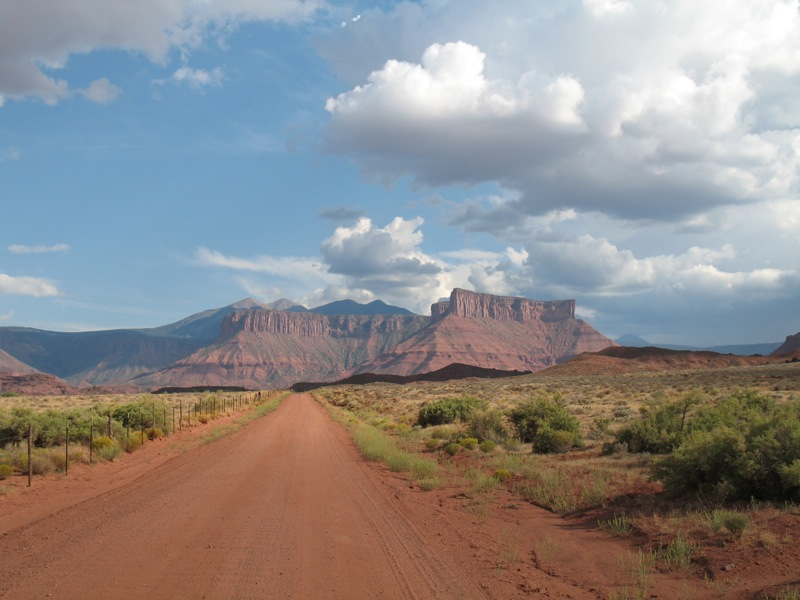
Dirt road near Moab, Utah

Terms similar to dirt road are dry-weather road, earth road, or the "Class Four Highway" designation used in China. A track, dirt track, or earth track would normally be similar but less suitable for larger vehicles—the distinction is not well-defined. Laterite and murram roads, depending on material used, may be dirt roads or improved roads.

== Characteristics ==
Compared to a gravel road, a dirt road is not usually graded regularly to produce an enhanced camber to encourage rainwater to drain off the road, and drainage ditches at the sides may be absent. They are unlikely to have embankments through low-lying areas. This leads to greater waterlogging and erosion, and after heavy rain the road may be impassable even to off-road vehicles. For this reason, in some countries, such as Australia and New Zealand and Finland, they are known as dry-weather roads.

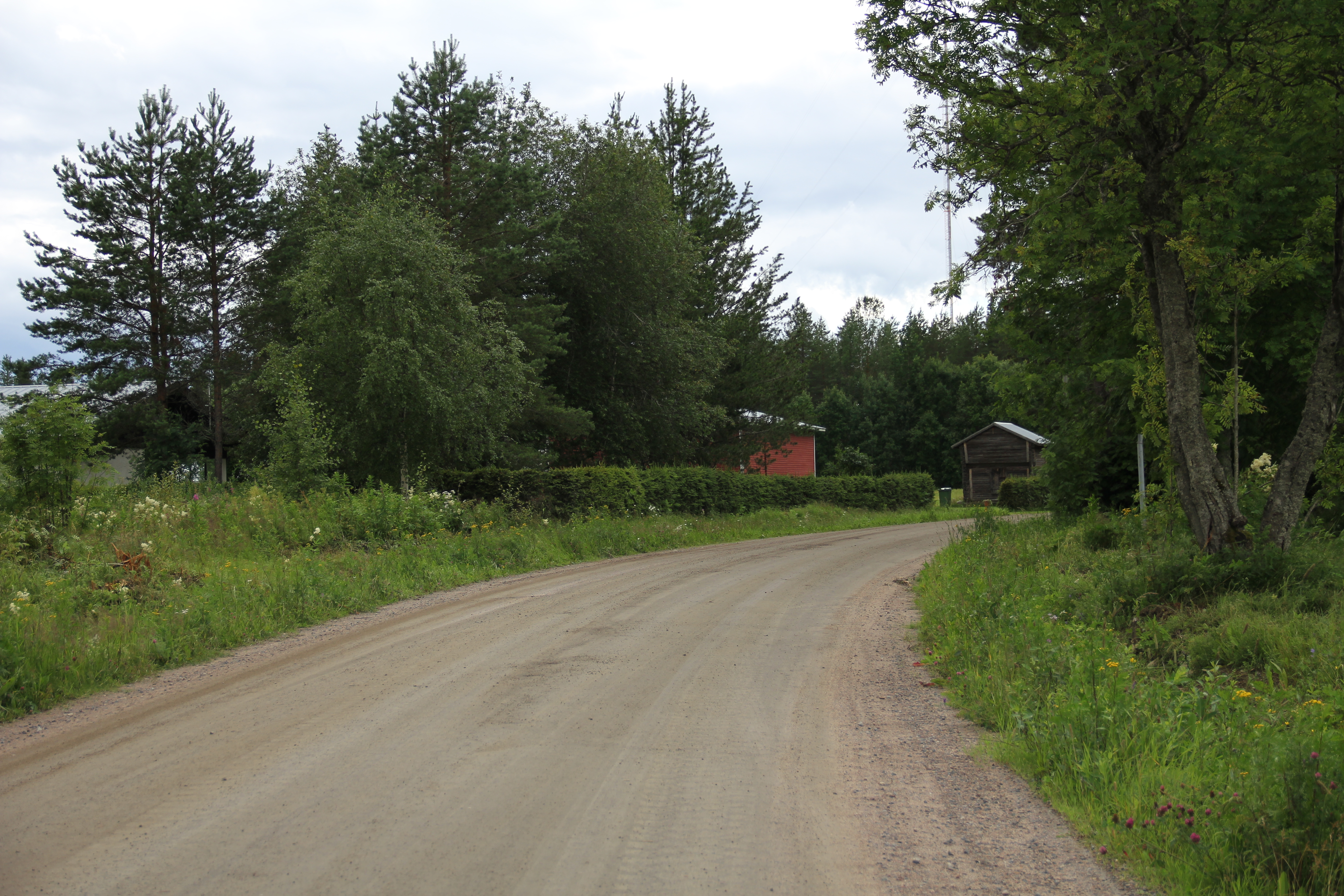
A dirt road in Kärsämäki, Finland

Dirt roads take on different characteristics according to the soils and geology where they pass, and may be sandy, stony, rocky or have a bare earth surface, which could be extremely muddy and slippery when wet, and baked hard when dry. They are likely to become impassable after rain. They are common in rural areas of many countries, often very narrow and infrequently used, and are also found in metropolitan areas of many developing countries, where they may also be used as major highways and have considerable width.

Dirt roads almost always form a washboard-like surface with ridges. The reason for this is that dirt roads have tiny irregularities; a wheel hitting a bump pushes it forward, making it bigger, while a wheel pushing over a bump pushes dirt into the next bump. However, the surface can remain flat for velocities less than 5 mph (8 km/h).

In many regions, dirt roads are commonly used as forest or rural access roads, where they are exposed to variable traffic loads and environmental conditions. Their performance is highly dependent on soil type, moisture content, and drainage conditions, with poor drainage often leading to softening, rutting, and loss of bearing capacity.

Recent research in Sweden has investigated methods to improve the durability and performance of forest roads constructed from native soils. A large-scale project evaluated solutions such as improved drainage systems, optimized compaction, geocell reinforcement, and environmentally friendly stabilization techniques.

== See also ==
- Byway (road)
- Country lane
- Green lane (road)
- Trail
- Unpaved road
