= Rights of way in England and Wales =

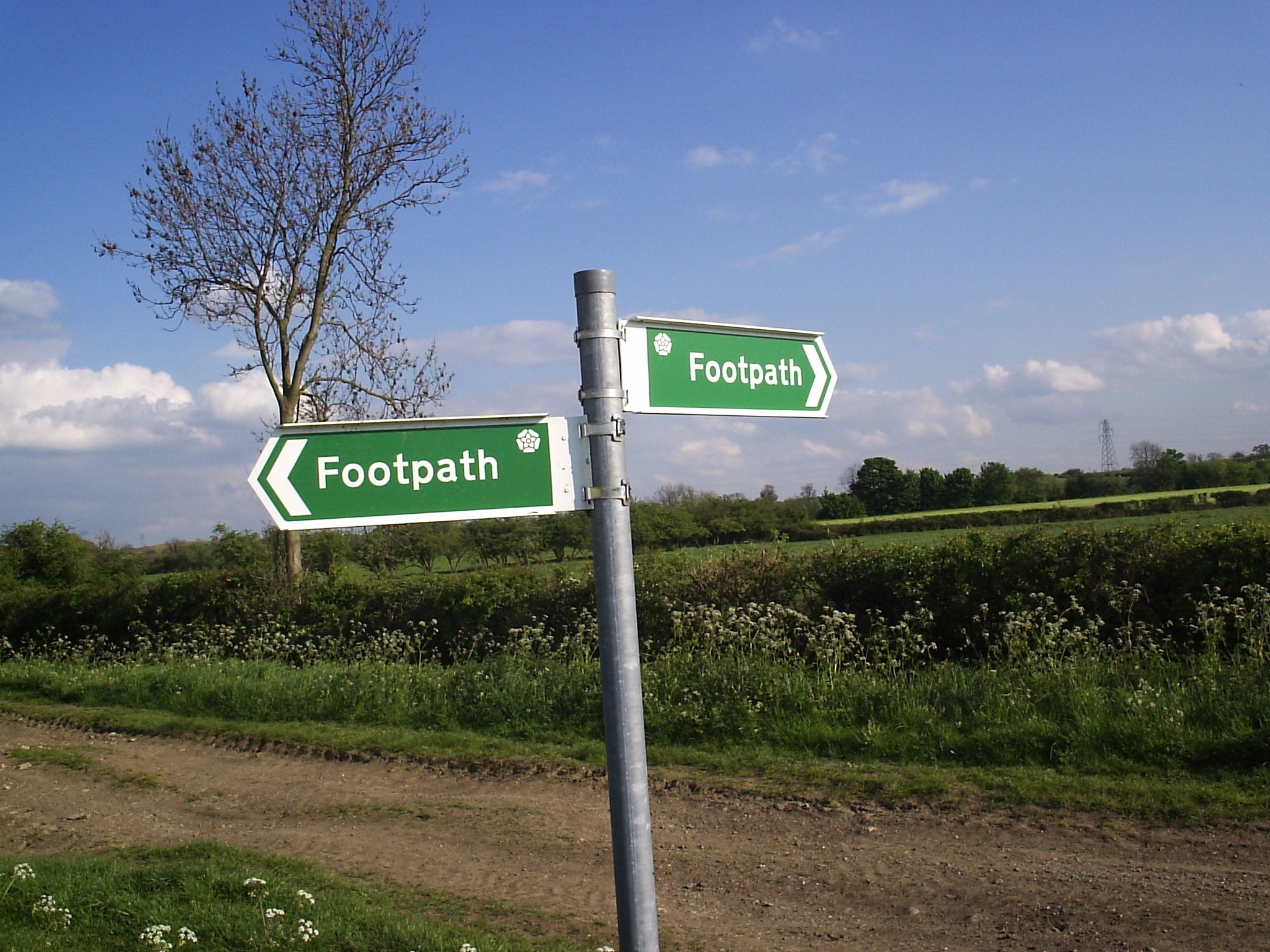
A footpath sign

In England and Wales, excluding the 12 Inner London boroughs and the City of London, the right of way is a legally protected right of the public to pass and re-pass on specific paths. Private rights of way or easements also exist.

The law in England and Wales differs from Scots law in that rights of way exist only where they are so designated (or are able to be designated if not already), whereas in Scotland any route that meets certain conditions is defined as a right of way, and in addition, there is a general presumption of access to the countryside (the "right to roam").

== Definitive maps ==
Definitive maps of public rights of way have been compiled for all of England and Wales, as a result of the National Parks and Access to the Countryside Act 1949, except the 12 Inner London boroughs, which, along with the City of London, were not covered by the Act. Definitive maps exist for the Outer London boroughs.

Local highways authorities (usually county councils or unitary authorities) are required to maintain the definitive map of all public rights of way in their areas, which can be inspected at council offices. If a path is shown on the definitive map and no subsequent legal order (such as a stopping up order) exists then the right of way is conclusive in law. Just because a path is not shown on that map does not mean that it is not a public path, as the rights may not have been recorded – the legal principle being "once a highway, always a highway". The Countryside Agency estimated that over 10% of public paths were not yet listed on the definitive map. The Countryside and Rights of Way Act 2000 provides that paths that are not recorded on the definitive map by 2026 and that were in use prior to 1949 will automatically be deemed stopped up on 1 January 2026.

== Rights of users ==
The highway right to use a right of way is restricted to passing and re-passing, associated activities, and the taking of 'usual accompaniments'. For example, Bedford Borough Council states that walkers may:

- take a pram, pushchair or wheelchair, where possible
- take a dog, on a lead or under close control
- stop for a rest
- take a short alternative route to get round an obstruction

A bicycle being pushed is also a usual accompaniment of a pedestrian; a proposed clause of the Countryside Act 1968 to explicitly allow the wheeling of a bicycle along a footpath was rejected on the basis that such an action was already legal.

== Ownership ==
Highways maintainable at public expense generally remain in the ownership of the landowner, but such highways are also vested in the local highway authority; vesting being a form or ownership so long as it remains a highway. Lord Jenkins, in an 'obiter' statement (not a formal judgement) suggested that ownership might be from the surface of the route to the depth of "two spits", or approximately two spade depths. Collins M.R. seems to have defined it better: 'All the stratum of air above the surface and all the stratum of soil below the surface which in any reasonable sense can be required for the purposes of the street, as street'

== Public footpaths ==
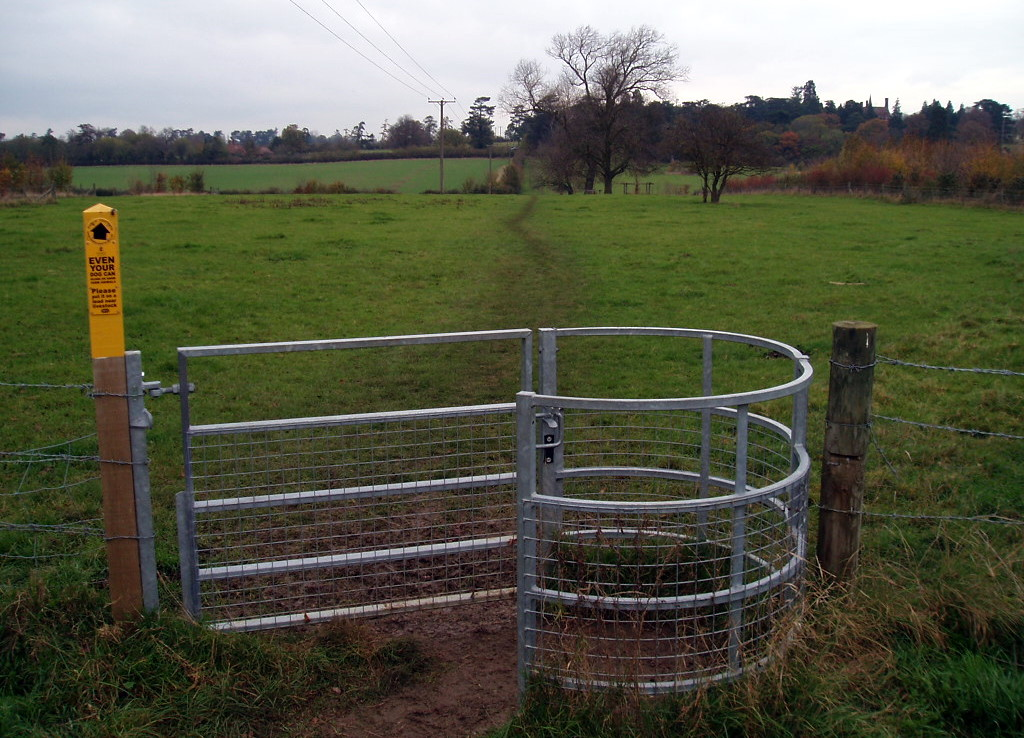
Kissing gate with yellow footpath markings

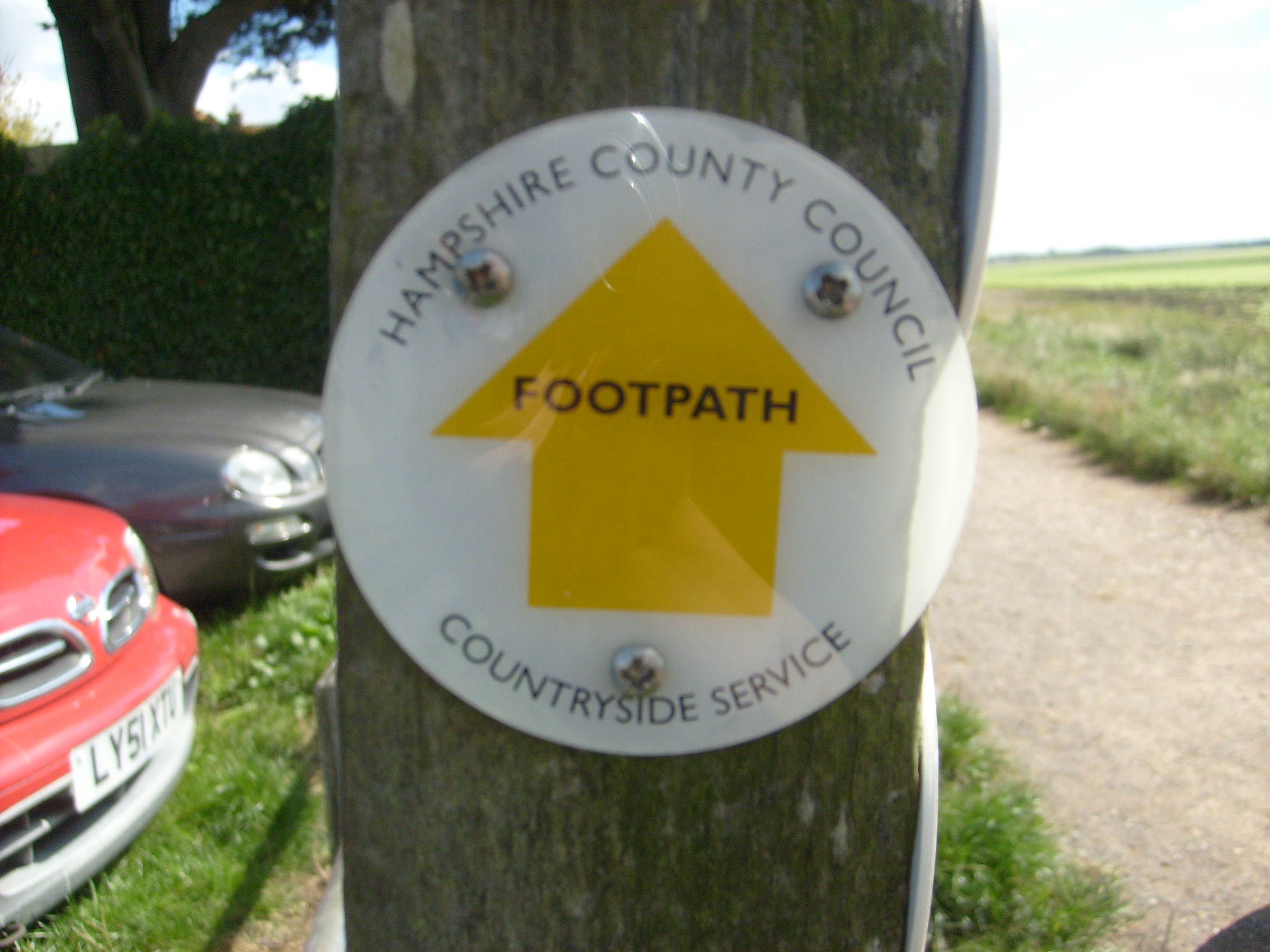
A Hampshire County Council footpath waymark

In England and Wales, a public footpath is a path on which the public have a legally protected right to travel on foot. In some areas public footpaths form a dense network of short paths. It is probable that most footpaths in the countryside are hundreds of years old. The majority of footpaths are shown on Ordnance Survey 1:25,000 and 1:50,000 maps.

The right of access on a public footpath normally only extends to walking (there may be other unrecorded rights as well), so there is usually no right to cycle or ride a horse on a public footpath. However, it is not a criminal offence to do so unless there is a traffic order or bylaw in place specifically: it is a civil wrong to ride a bicycle or a horse on a public footpath, and action could be taken by the landowner for trespass or nuisance by the user.

== Public bridleways ==
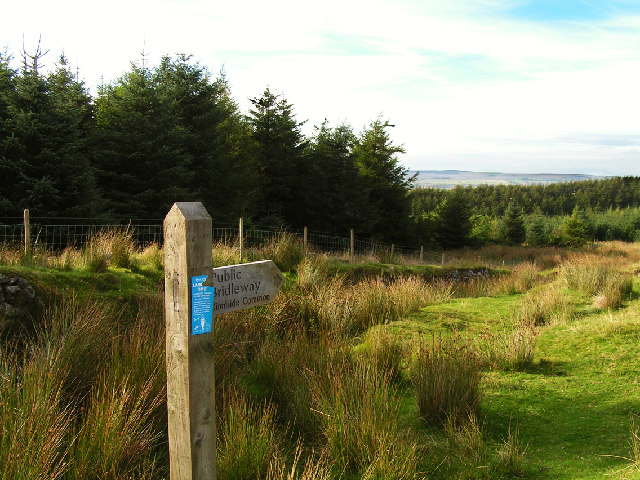
A bridleway fingerpost

A public bridleway is a way over which the general public have the following rights, but normally (unless otherwise according to Wildlife and Countryside Act 1981 s56(1)(b)) no other rights:

- to travel on foot, and
- to travel on bicycle, and
- to travel on horseback or leading a horse, with or without a right to drive animals of any description along the way.

Although Section 30 of the Countryside Act 1968 permits the riding of bicycles on public bridleways, the act says that it "shall not create any obligation to facilitate the use of the bridleway by cyclists". Thus, the right to cycle exists even though it may be difficult to exercise on occasion. Cyclists using a bridleway are obliged to give way to other users on foot or on horseback.

Public bridleways are shown on Ordnance Survey 1:25,000 and 1:50,000 maps, but many public bridleways (as well as "roads used as public paths", "byways open to all traffic" and "restricted byways") were recorded as footpaths only, as a result of the burden of maintenance required by the National Parks and Access to the Countryside Act 1949, and so are now wrongly recorded on the definitive map. Definitive Map Modification Orders are needed to correct these errors.

== Byways open to all traffic ==
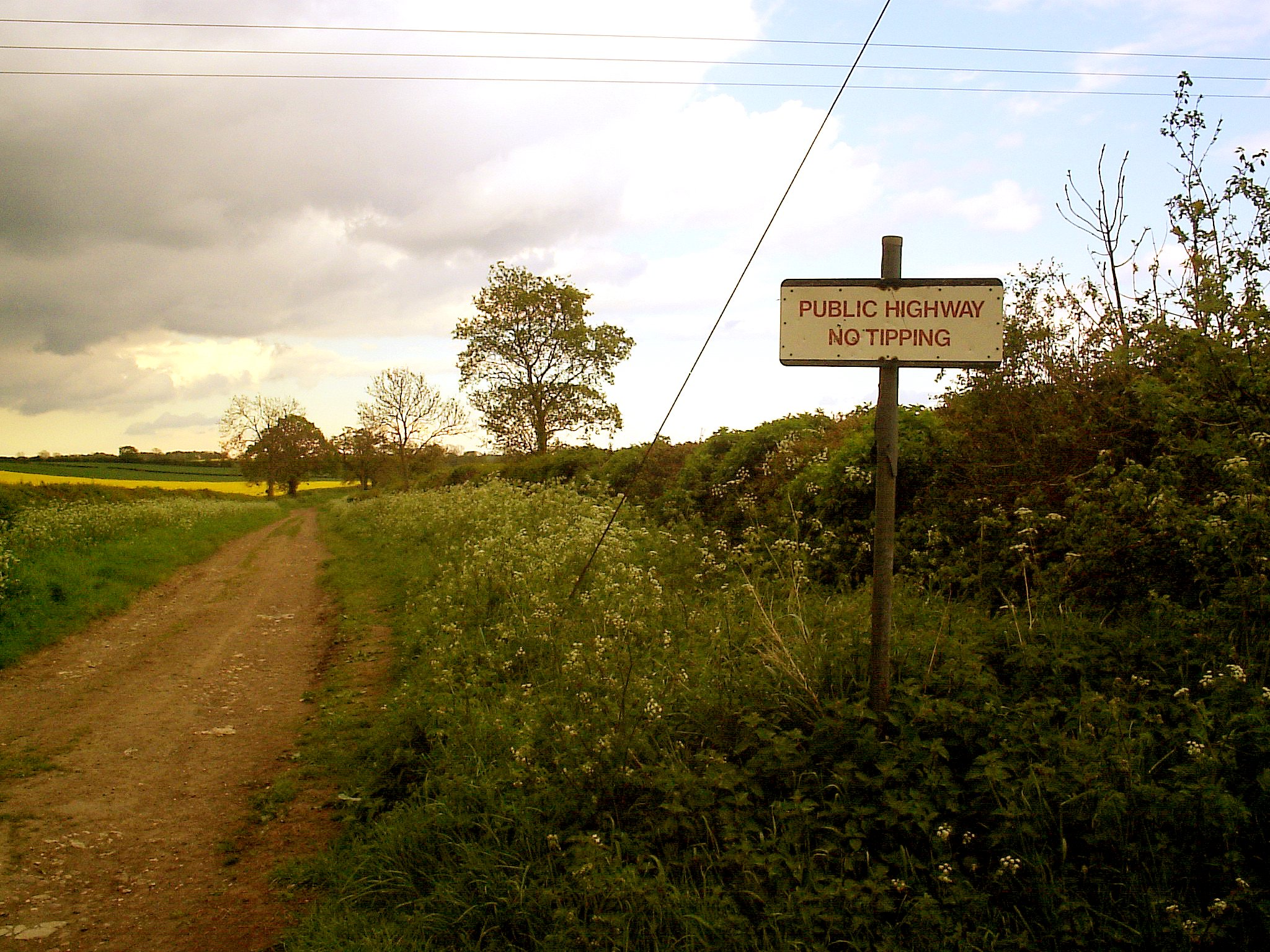
A Northamptonshire byway

A byway open to all traffic (or BOAT) is a highway over which the general public have a right to travel for vehicular and all other kinds of traffic, but which is used by the public mainly as footpaths and bridleways are used, per Road Traffic Regulation Act 1984, section 15(9)(c), as amended by Road Traffic (Temporary Restrictions) Act 1991, Schedule 1.

After the 2006 Regulations to the Countryside and Rights of Way Act 2000, BOATs should now more properly be referred to simply as byways.

== Roads used as public paths ==
A road used as public path (RUPP) was one of the three types of public right of way (along with footpaths and bridleways) introduced by the National Parks and Access to the Countryside Act 1949. The Countryside Act 1968 required all highway authorities to reclassify RUPPs in their area – occasionally as public footpaths but in practice generally as public bridleways – unless public vehicular rights were demonstrated to exist, in which case it would become a 'byway open to all traffic'.

This process was slow as it involved research into historic usage and often public enquiries, and so was not completed by the time the Countryside and Rights of Way Act 2000 was passed. This reclassified all remaining RUPPs as 'restricted byways' on 2 May 2006.

== Restricted byways ==
On 2 May 2006, the Natural Environment and Rural Communities Act 2006 reclassified all remaining roads used as public paths as restricted byways. The public's rights along a restricted byway are to travel:

- on foot
- on horseback or leading a horse
- by any vehicle (e.g. bicycles, horse-drawn carriages) other than mechanically propelled vehicles (e.g. motorbikes or cars) unless vehicular rights pre-existed; the act did not extinguish those rights.

== Permissive path ==
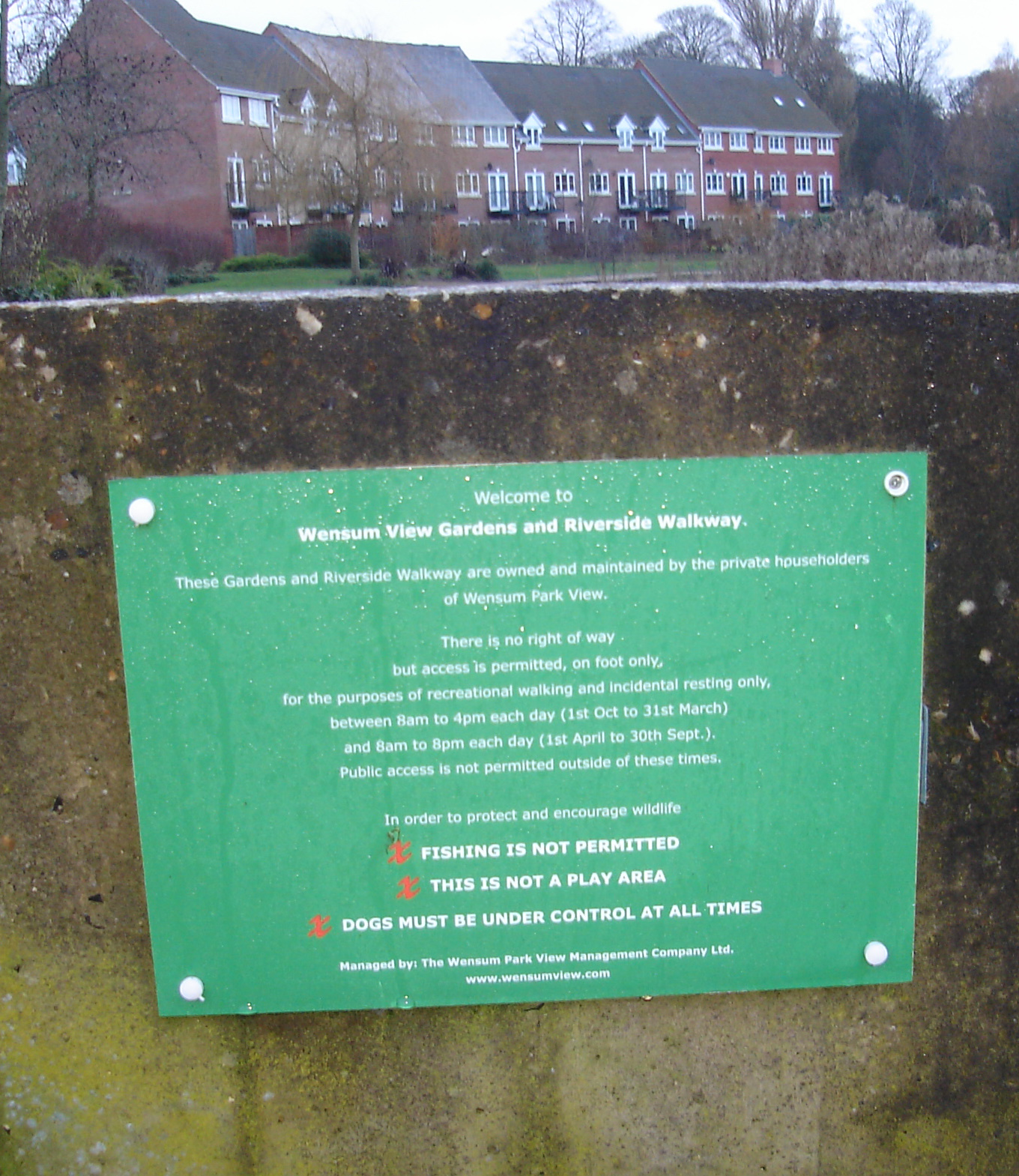
Permissive path along River Wensum, Norfolk, England

A permissive path, permitted path or concessionary path is a path (which could be for walkers, riders, cyclists, or any combination) whose use is allowed by the landowner. It would normally be a path that is not at the time on the definitive map of public rights of way, but that does not prevent it from already being a public path for any or all of those user categories mentioned. For instance it might be a historic route fallen into disuse, or it might have been used for twenty years 'as of right' by the public, in both cases being a public right of way which is not yet shown on the definitive map. Some permissive footpaths and bridleways are shown on 1:25,000 and 1:50,000 scale Ordnance Survey maps.

A permissive path is often closed on a specified calendar day each year (lawful only if it is not already a public right of way of some description), and clearly signed (e.g. signpost or waymark) as permissive. The act of so closing or signing it ensures that any future use of it does not count towards the 20 years' use 'as of right' needed to establish its public status. These are precautions to prevent it becoming designated as a statutory right of way in relation to its permitted use.

== Right to roam ==
Under the Countryside and Rights of Way Act 2000 the public also has a right to walk away from rights of way on designated "access land". This right is in addition to rights of way, and does not extend to horse-riders or cyclists. Access land may be closed for up to 28 days per year, whereas rights of way must remain open at all times, except in exceptional circumstances with special permission of the local authority.

== Creation of new public rights of way ==
A footpath, bridleway or restricted byway can be created by one of the following means.

=== Dedication ===
In England and Wales, a footpath, bridleway or restricted byway may be expressly dedicated by the owner as a public right of way. Furthermore, unchallenged use by the public, as of right, for at least 20 years, may give rise to a presumption of dedication under Section 31 of the Highways Act 1980. A presumption of dedication may arise under common law after any appropriate period of time, by way of a presumed deed that has been lost; known as the doctrine of "modern lost grant". Paths created by express dedication since 1949 are not automatically maintainable at the public expense as a result of s.49 National Parks and Access to the Countryside Act 1949.

=== Public path creation agreement ===
Section 25 of the Highways Act 1980 allows a local authority (that is, a district or county council, or a unitary authority) to enter into an agreement (known as a 'public path creation agreement') with a relevant landowner to create a footpath or bridleway over land in their area. The local authority has to consult any other local authority in whose area the path will be, but does not have to consult more widely. There is no provision for anyone else to be consulted or to object. The agreement must be advertised in the local paper, and the route is automatically maintainable at public expense.

=== Agreement between a parish council and landowner ===
Section 30 of the Highways Act 1980 allows a parish council (community council in Wales) to enter into an agreement with a relevant landowner to create a footpath, bridleway or restricted byway over land in their area or in an adjacent parish. The parish council is under no obligation to consult anyone: all they have to do is reach an agreement with the landowner. There is no provision for anyone else to be consulted or to object. The path is not automatically maintainable at the public expense.

=== Public path creation order ===
Section 26 of the Highways Act 1980 allows a local authority (that is, a district or county council, or a unitary authority) to make an order to create a footpath or bridleway over land in their area. If there are no objections, the local authority can confirm the order themselves, so bringing the path into effect. However, where objections have been made, the order will need to be considered by an inspector from the Planning Inspectorate. Depending on the number and nature of the objections, he may consider the order after an exchange of written representations between the authority and the objectors, after holding a hearing, or after a public local inquiry. People who would like to use the path should submit letters saying why they need the path.

=== Street works authority ===
Section 228 of the Highways Act 1980 is mainly used by the street works authority (county council or unitary authority) to declare a street to be a highway maintainable at public expense. The street works authority has to perform works on the route. Such street works need only be appropriate to the type of highway to which the notice relates. So for a potential bridleway, if the grass is cut, or a hedge cut back, this could constitute street works for the purpose of this section, so enabling it to be used. The authority then places s.228 "Adoption of Streets" notices at each end of the route. Only the owner of a street (or if more than one, the majority of the owners) has the power to object. If there is an objection, the street works authority can either discontinue, or it can go to a magistrates' court. A path created by this method will be maintainable at the public expense. Hampshire County Council has used this method for footpaths, and Essex County Council often uses it for new bridleways.

== Rights of way improvement plans ==
Each highway authority in England and Wales (other than Transport for London, the City of London and Inner London boroughs) was required to produce a Rights of Way Improvement Plan under sections 60 to 62 of the Countryside and Rights of Way Act 2000 within five years of the date on which Section 60 of the Countryside and Rights of Way Act came into force; this deadline was 21 November 2007. Each highway authority is required to review their Rights of Way Improvement Plan at least every ten years.

== Gallery ==
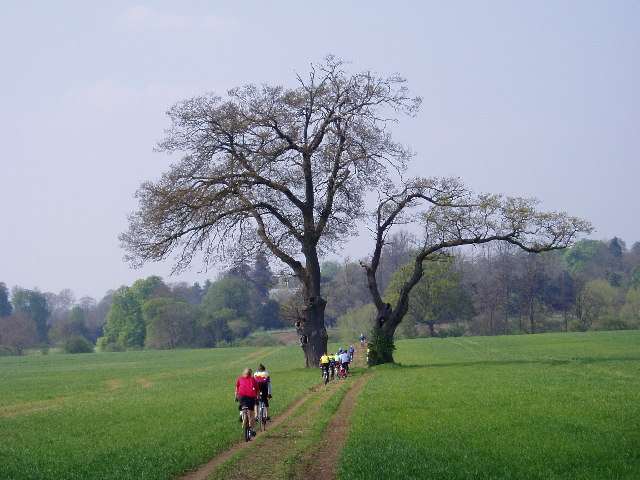
Cyclists on a bridleway

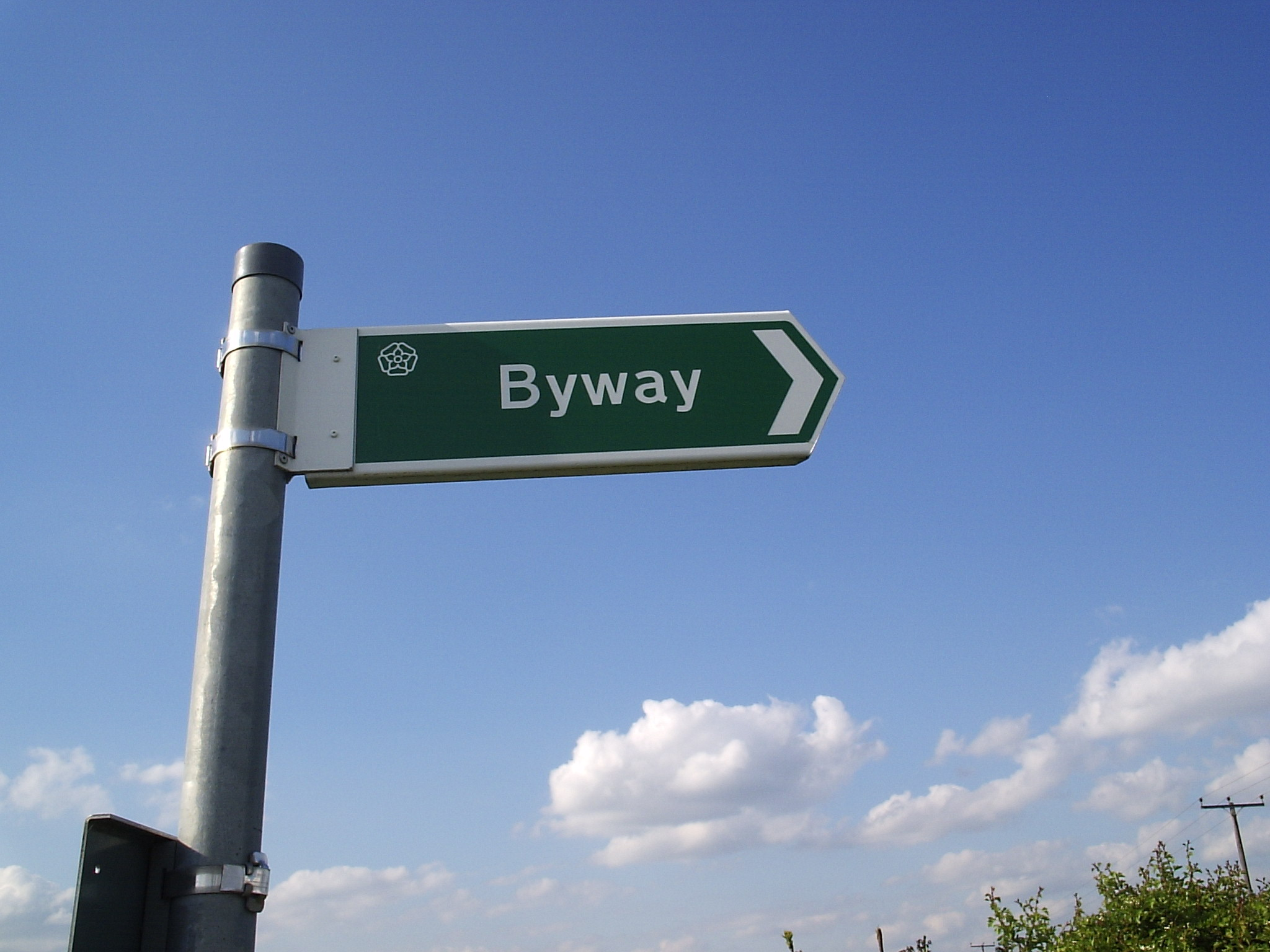
Byway sign

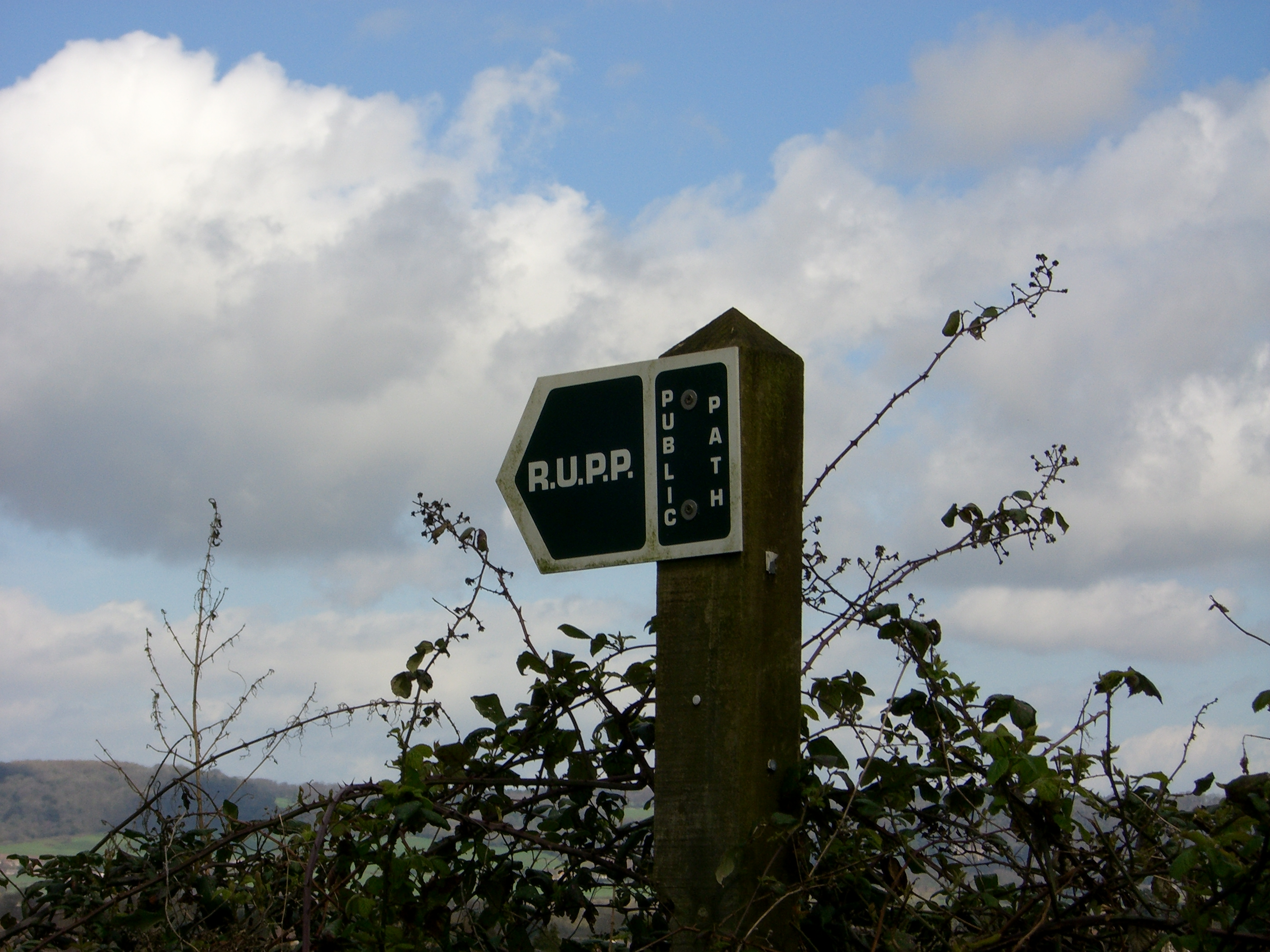
RUPP sign

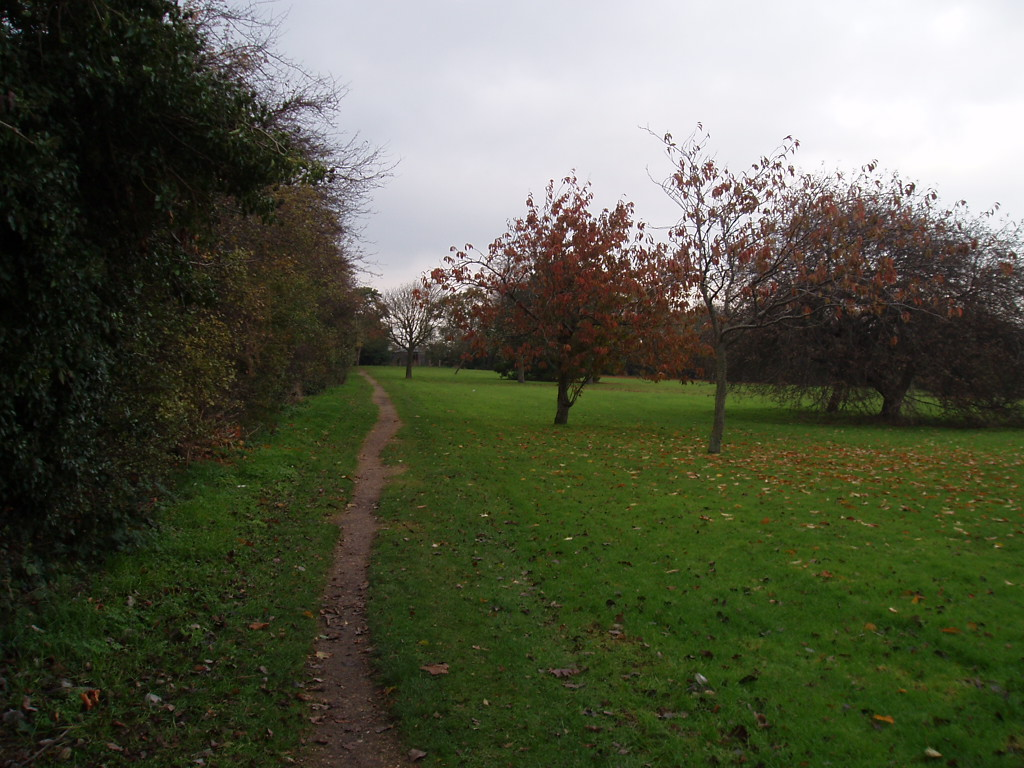
Footpath in England

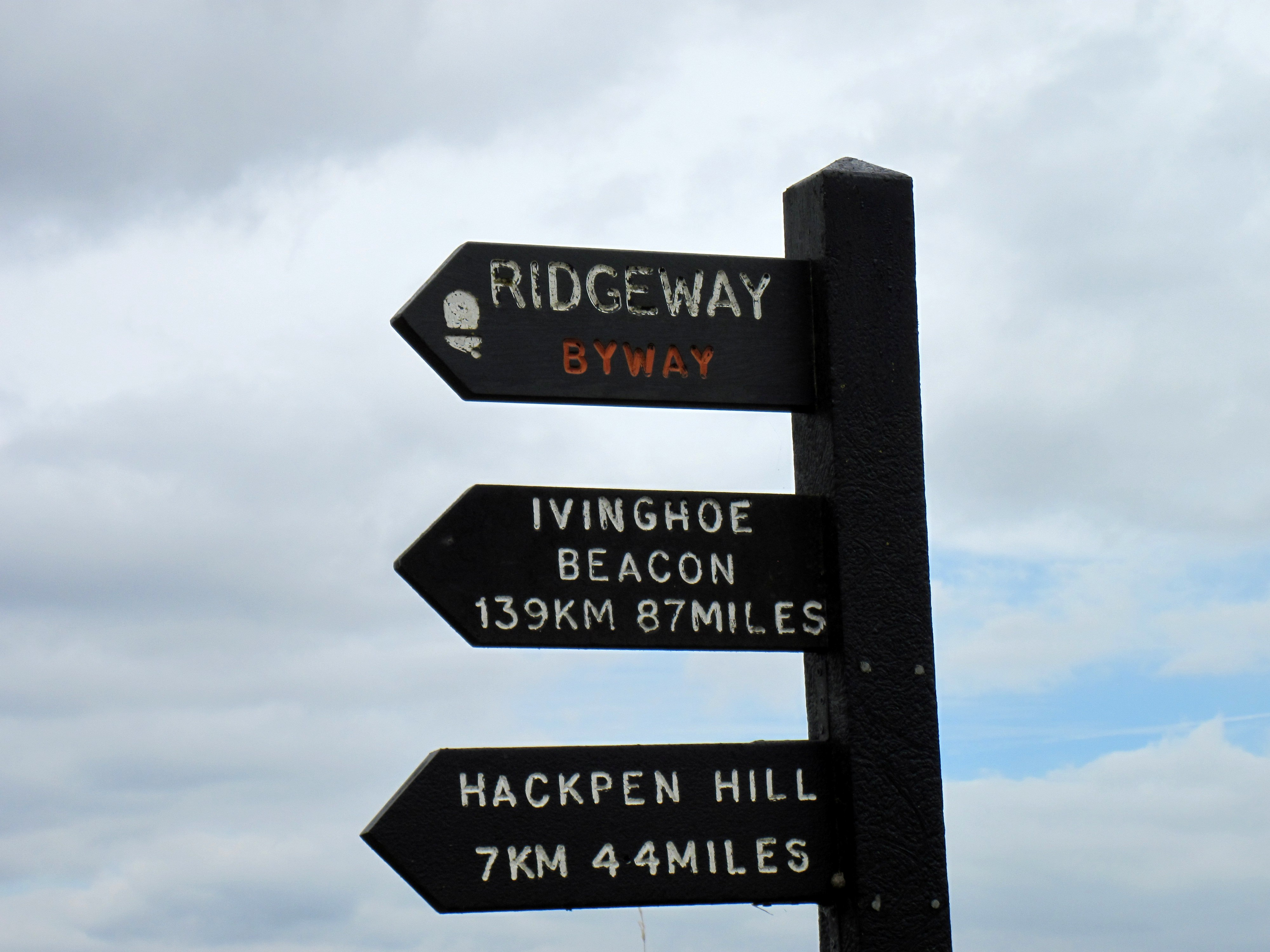
Special signage on The Ridgeway which is a National Trail

== See also ==
- Alley – Narrow street that usually runs between, behind, or within buildings
- Corpse road – Road historically used to transport corpses to cemeteries
- Green lane (road) – Unpaved rural route wider than a footpath
- Highways in England and Wales
- Right of way (disambiguation)
  - Right of way – Legal authority to use a specific route
  - Right of way (traffic) – Passage priority
- Trail – Path for mostly non-motorized travel through a natural area
