= Upper Valley Trails Alliance =

American non-profit organization

The Upper Valley Trails Alliance, or UVTA, is a non-profit trails organization created in 1999, based in Norwich, Vermont, and serving the towns of the Upper Connecticut River Valley. According to the group's executive director in 2016, UVTA's long-term goal is a "connected network of trails throughout the Upper Valley that is accessible by all users".

Unlike many related groups, such as the Appalachian Mountain Club, which lead hikes and perform trail maintenance, UVTA serves more as an umbrella group, bringing together people from diverse backgrounds who are interested in protecting and expanding existing trail networks. For example, mountain bikes are banned from using the Appalachian Trail and several other major trail systems, due to a variety of reasons including concerns about trail erosion. In the summer of 2004, UVTA helped sponsor a visit by a representative of the International Mountain Bicycling Association to help dispel some of the myths and facilitate a more expansive multi-use trail network. Because of this role convening various groups, UVTA spends as much time working with local land trust and conservation commission groups as it does working on the trail.

In late 2003, UVTA received a major grant from the Robert Wood Johnson Foundation to promote more active lifestyles in the Upper Valley through the use of trails. The result of this grant was the Trails for Life program, in association with several prominent local groups, such as the town of Hanover, New Hampshire, Dartmouth College and Dartmouth–Hitchcock Medical Center. This program has so far resulted in the publication of an entry-level walking guide to local trails, and the inception of a prescription walking program, through which doctors prescribe a certain amount of physical activity each day for inactive patients. Trails for Life also aims to help towns and real estate developers create more walkable/bikeable communities.
