= Back road =

Type of rural road

A back road (also known as a country lane in the United Kingdom) is a secondary type of road usually found in rural areas. Back roads are typically narrow and connect main roads to property, agricultural land, or other back roads in the countryside. In the United States, back roads are typically made of dirt and gravel as opposed to paved back roads typically found in the British Isles.

== Safety ==
Back roads tend to have narrow lanes, limited or non-existent shoulders, inconsistent pavement with gravel patches, sharp curves, steep slopes, and poor visibility. The majority of American back roads were built early in US road history, prior to modern safety standards and vehicle designs.

Back roads are less safe than other roads, boasting much higher fatality rates. A 2015 study by TRIP (a national transportation research group) in the United States found that back roads have a traffic fatality rate of 2.18 deaths per 100 million vehicle miles traveled, while the average across all US roads is 0.38. Of all vehicle miles traveled in the United States, 22% are driven on back roads, but 43% of vehicle collisions in 2015 (15,132 out of 35,092) occurred on back roads. In 2015, Texas had the highest number of rural non-interstate traffic deaths at 1,259, with California in second place at 1,219 deaths.

== In the United States ==
In North Carolina, where they are also referred to as "blue roads," back roads are one- or two-laned roads off larger roads, such as parkways, and are often made of gravel. Many back roads in North Carolina were created when the state's rural transportation system began investing in urban factories to relocate to rural areas. This created a system of back roads that allowed for factories to disperse away from busy urban areas. This was done in the late 1940s under Governor Kerr Scott and was known as the states rural farm-to-market road system. The idea for the farm-to-market road system was to connect farms out in rural areas to the markets in which they sold their produce, which would allow for easy transportation for those who transported their goods to market places. Ultimately these types of roads became state highways or nice quality roads, but the importance of their beginnings is that they began as rural back-roads for agricultural purposes.

In Vermont, the Natural Resources Conservation Service has established the Better Back Roads program to help towns and organizations deal with road-related soil erosion problems through grants. Both paved and unpaved back roads are eligible for these grants, which seek to protect water quality from sediment accumulation caused by road and ditch erosion.

== In the United Kingdom ==
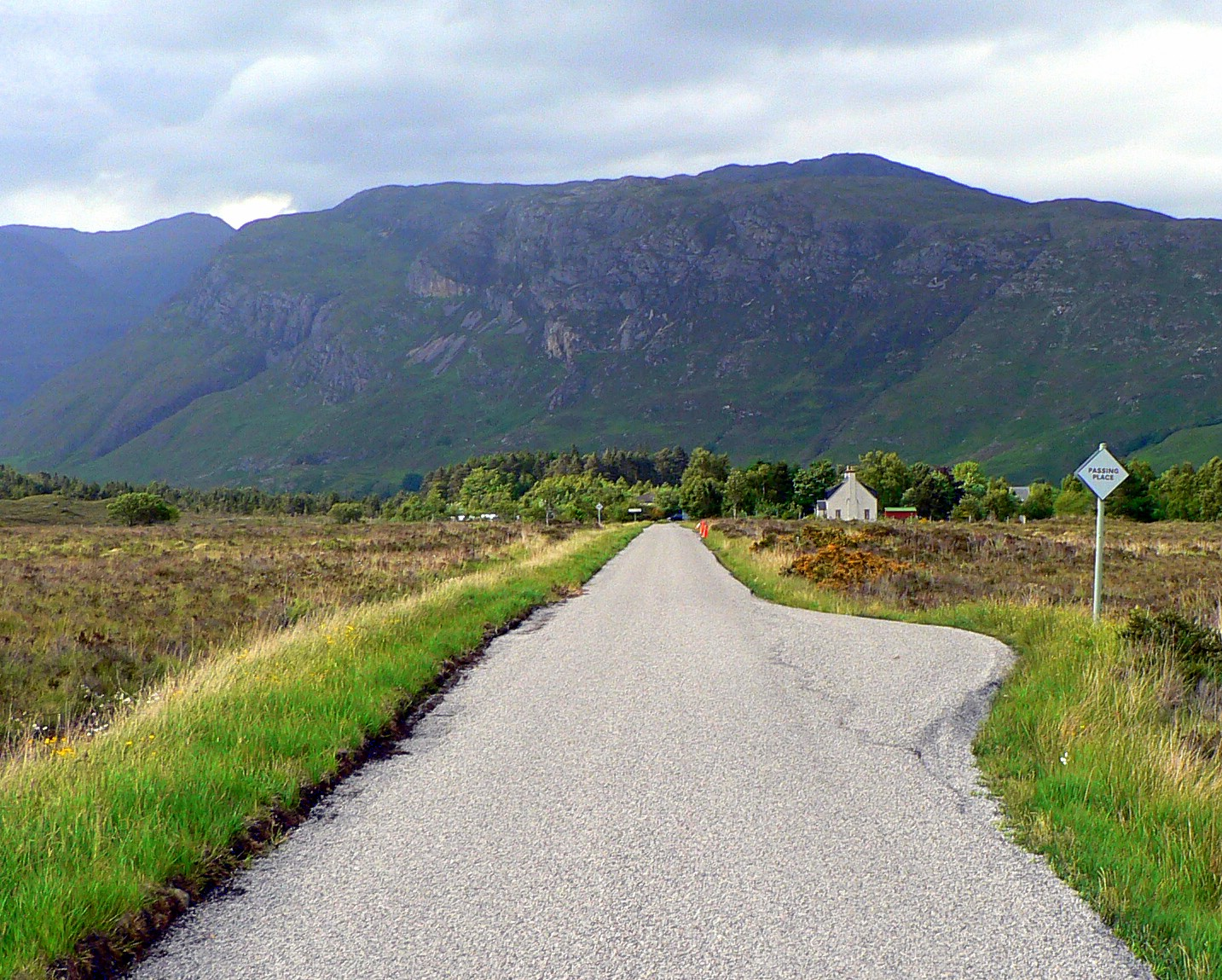
Example of a passing place on a country lane in Scotland

Because country lanes are typically "single lane" or "single track" (that is, the paved road is not wide enough for two vehicles to pass) there will usually be official or unofficial passing places along the route for traffic to pass safely.

== Gallery ==
Unpaved back road in Weybridge, Vermont, USA

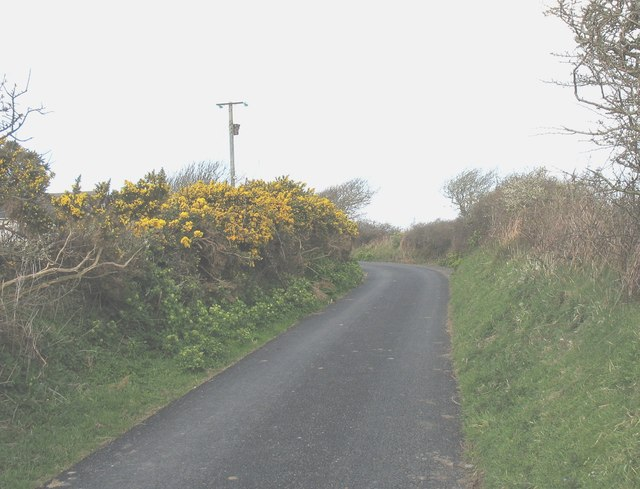
Paved back road, Llanfairyneubwll, Isle of Anglesey, UK

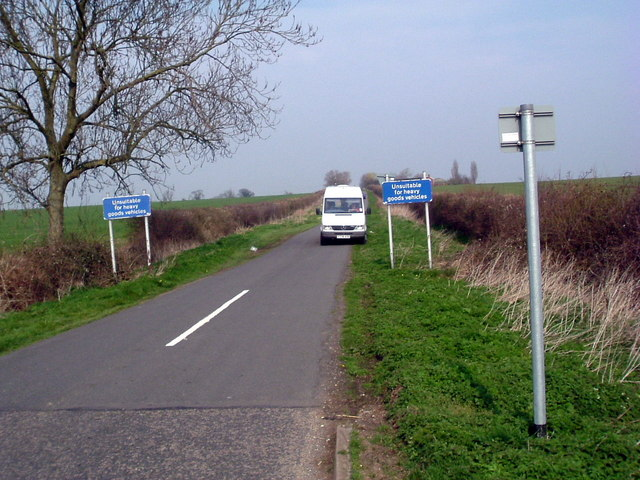
Narrow back road near Hargrave, Bedfordshire, UK

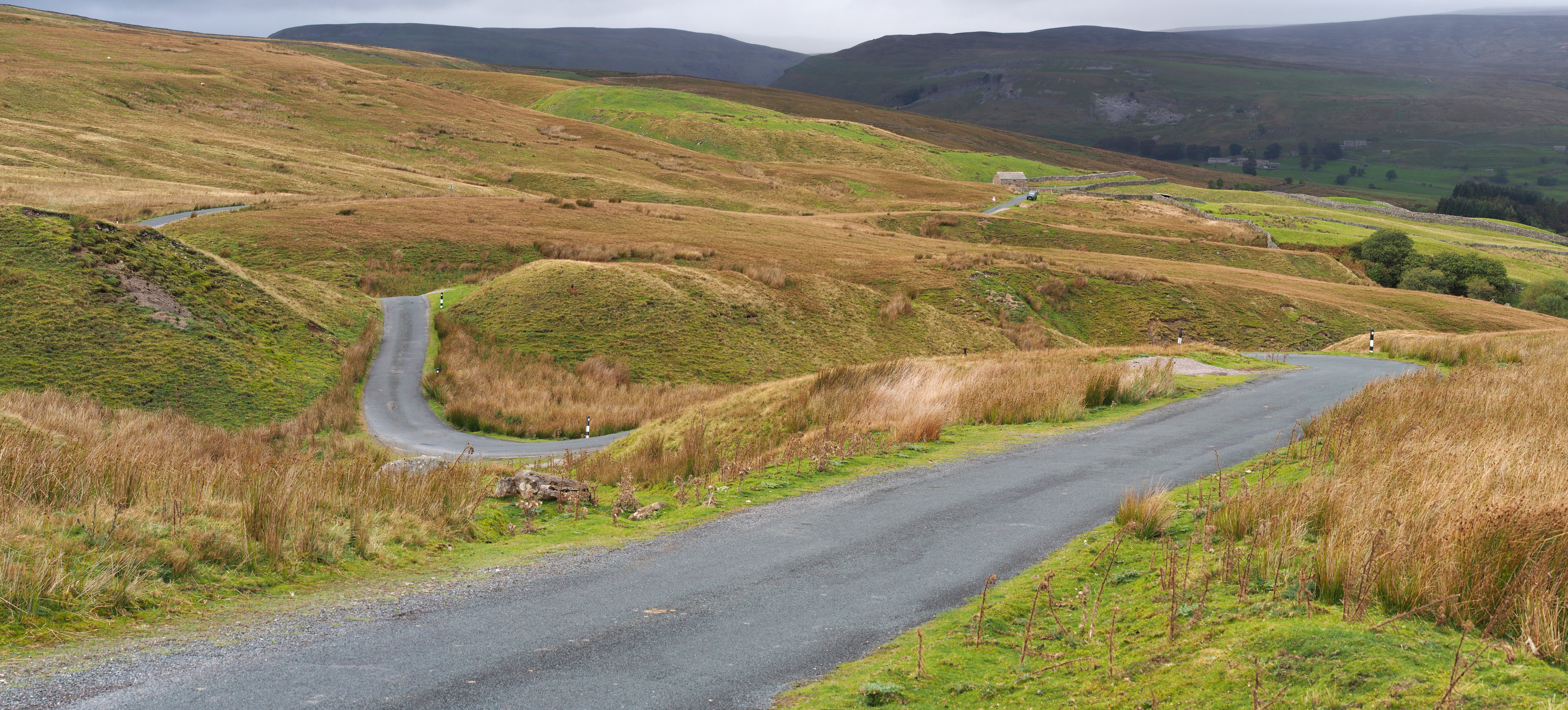
A back road in the Yorkshire Dales, England

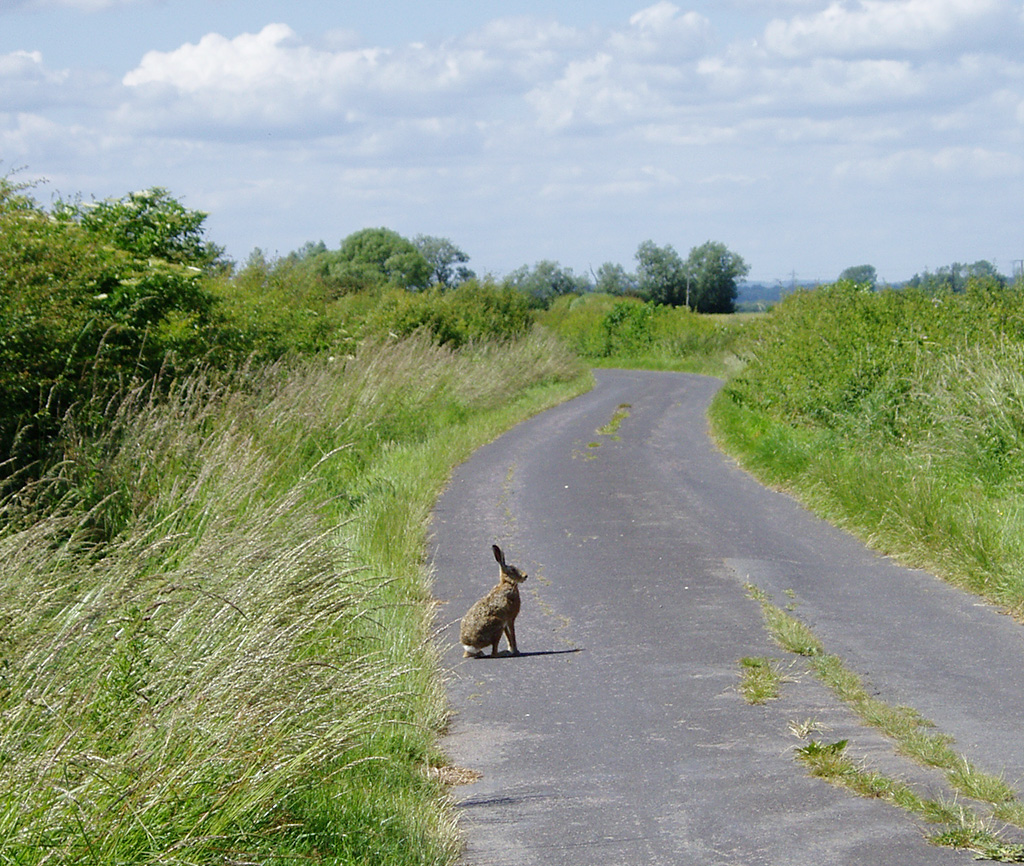
A wild hare in a country lane in England

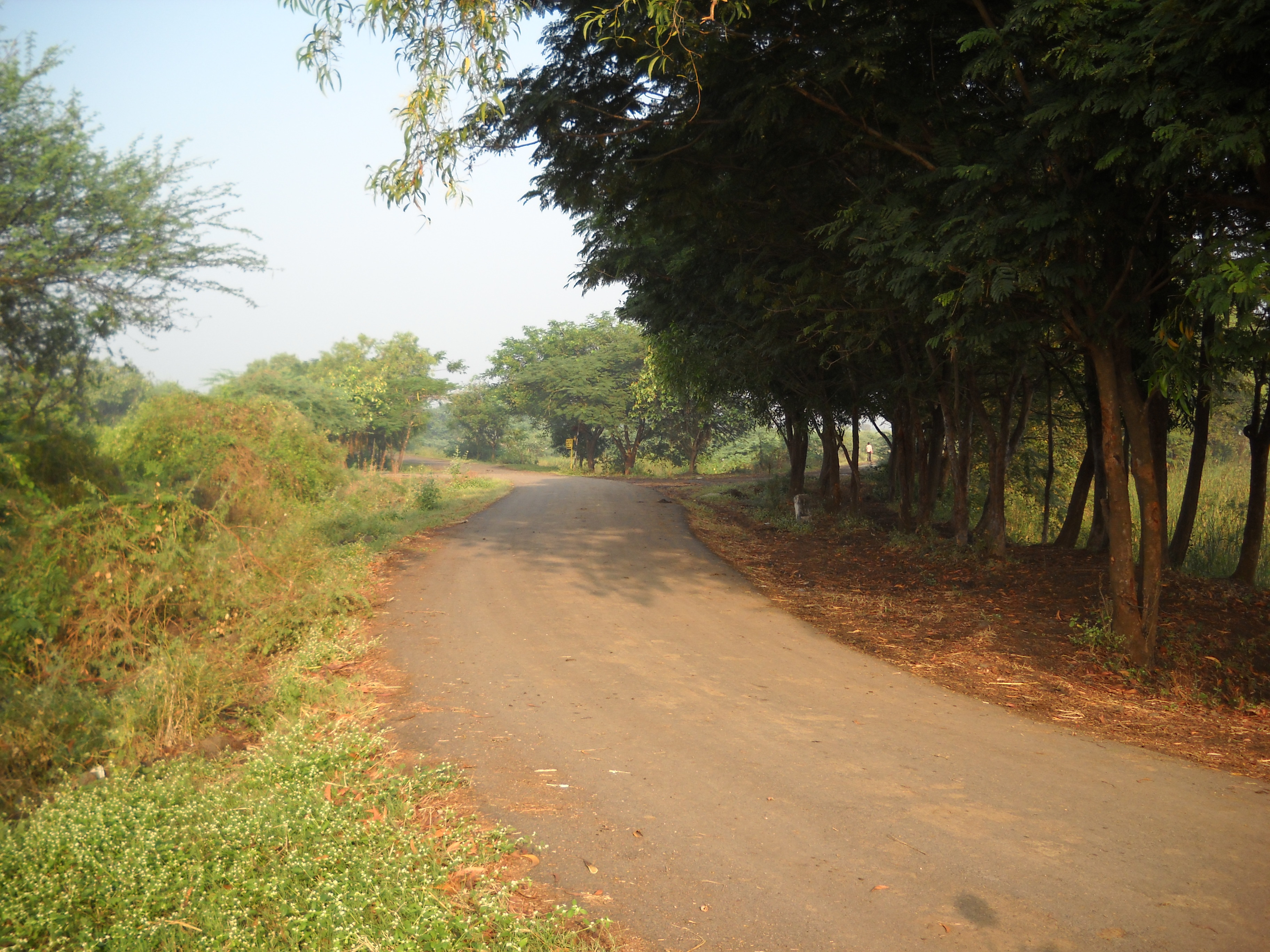
Unpaved back road near Talavdi, Gujarat, India

== See also ==
- Boreen, a country road in Ireland
- C roads in Great Britain
- Country lane, a narrow road in the countryside
- Dirt road
- Gravel road
- Green lane (road)
- Road traffic safety
- Single-track road
- Sunken lane
