= Green lane (road) =

Unpaved rural route wider than a footpath

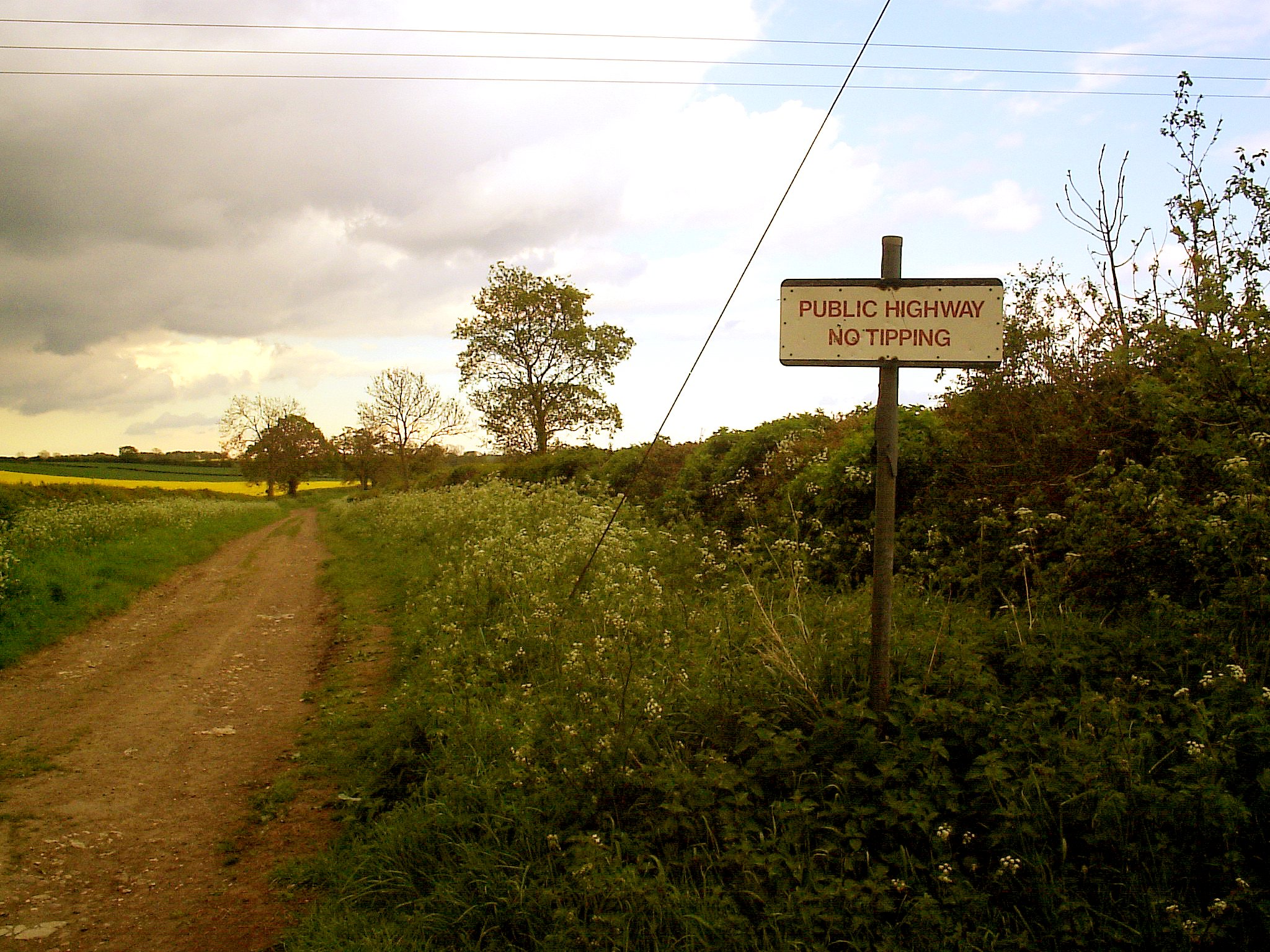
A green lane in Grendon, Northamptonshire

A green lane is a type of road in the United Kingdom, usually an unmetalled or unpaved rural route.

== England and Wales ==
In particular, a green lane is unmetalled, and may be so infrequently used that there is no wearing of the surface, allowing vegetation to colonise freely, hence "green". Many green lanes are ancient routes that have existed for millennia, such as hollow ways, drover's roads, ridgeways and even ancient trackways.

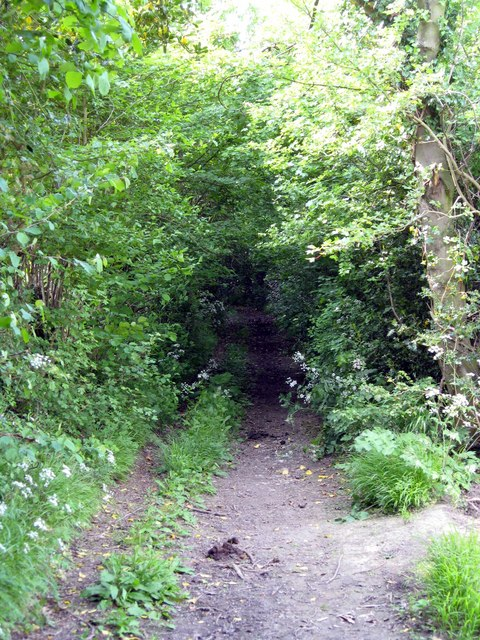
An overgrown green lane in Worcestershire.

Under modern public rights-of-way (PROW) law, the expression "green lane" has no legal meaning. Instead, there are four different types of public right of way, listed below, in addition to public roads:

- A footpath has pedestrian rights only.
- A bridleway allows pedestrians, horse traffic and cyclists.
- A byway open to all traffic (BOAT, or just 'byway') is open to all users and all types of traffic. However, as they are unsurfaced, they are often only passable in a 4×4 or on a trail motorbike, as well as by pedestrians and horse riders.
- A restricted byway (RB) allows pedestrians, horse traffic and vehicles other than mechanically propelled vehicles (e.g. bicycles, horse-drawn carriages). Restricted byways replaced the older road used as a public path (RUPP) classification.

An unclassified county road (UCR) is an obsolete expression and is no indication of a right of way, although they may be maintained and repaired at public expense by local highway authorities. The surfaces of these routes can vary from broken tarmac and gravel to only grass, often having the appearance of byways. As these routes are maintained at public expense, along with the rest of the highway network, it is presumed that these routes are open to all traffic. They are not shown on the definitive map.

The Countryside Act 1968 required all highway authorities to reclassify RUPPs in their area—occasionally as footpaths but in practice generally as bridleways, unless public vehicular rights were demonstrated to exist, in which case the road was classified as a byway open to all traffic. This process involved extensive research into historic usage and often public enquiries. Section 47 of the Countryside and Rights of Way Act 2000 set a time limit of 2026 for every highway authority to complete the reclassification exercise. The Natural Environment and Rural Communities Act 2006 (NERC) changed the deadline to 2 May 2006.

This change is significant as RUPPs allowed motorised vehicular access, while restricted byways do not. This change resulted in some conflict between user groups. Some highway authorities neglected to carry out their responsibilities under the National Parks and Access to the Countryside Act 1949. This has meant that some counties, e.g. Somerset, have minimal off-road rights of way available to motorised vehicles, while other counties, e.g. Kent and Wiltshire, have a considerably more extensive network still available to vehicular users. It is calculated that before the CRoW Act approximately 5% of the national rights of way network was open to vehicular use, while post-CRoW this has halved to around 2 to 3%.

The various users of rights of way disagree (often passionately) about the other users' rights. Walkers' groups (such as the Ramblers' Association) advocate the removal of vehicular rights on BOATs. Cyclists' and equestrians' groups fear for their rights, while vehicular use of public rights of way is increasingly being seen as unacceptable and has been targeted for further restrictions. The rights of vehicle users are represented by the Green Lane Association, also known as GLASS, All Terrain UK and the Trail Riders Fellowship, who oppose these restrictions on the basis that a road is just that, regardless of the type of surface.

== Jersey ==
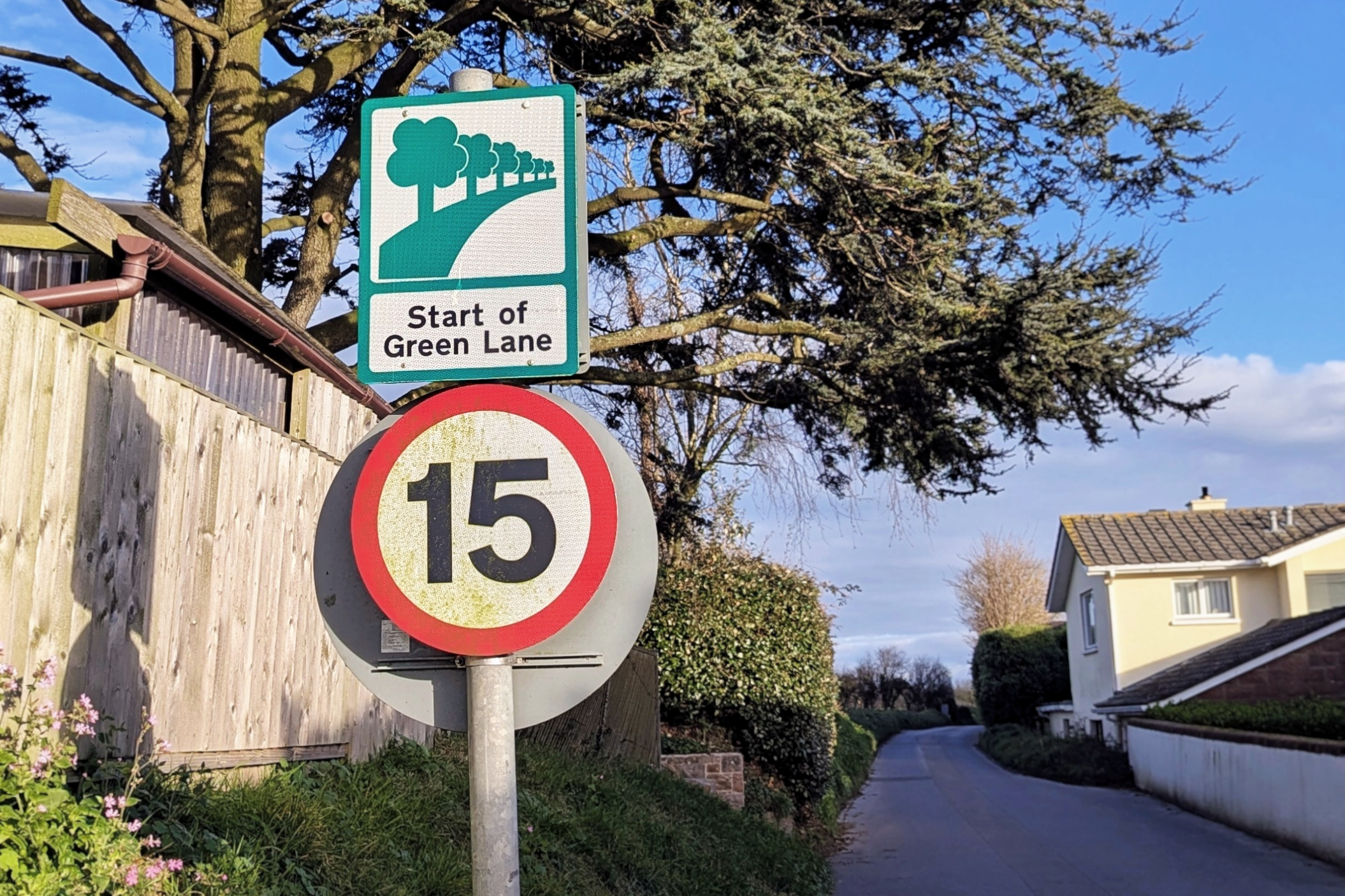
Green Lane signage in Jersey

In Jersey, a Green Lane is a road designated as priority for pedestrians, cyclists and horse-riders to which a 15 mph (24 km/h) speed limit applies. The first Green Lanes were introduced in St Peter in 1994. All parishes, except St Saviour and Trinity, have since joined the Green Lane network, but since St Saviour and Trinity adjoin across the Island the Green Lanes in the West and in the East do not link up.

== See also ==
- Country lane
- Off-roading
