= Definitive map =

Record of locations of public rights of way in England and Wales

A definitive map is a record of public rights of way in England and Wales. In law it is the definitive record of where a right of way is located. The highway authority (normally the county council, or unitary authority in areas with a one-tier system) has a statutory duty to maintain a definitive map. In national parks, the National Park Authority usually maintains the map. The Inner London boroughs are exempt from the statutory duty, though they have the powers to maintain a map: currently none does so. Details of the definitive map process are set out in the Natural England document A guide to definitive maps and changes to public rights of way.

Each right of way also has a written description referred to as the definitive statement. Generally the definitive map takes legal precedence over the definitive statement.

== Examples of Definitive Maps ==
Ceremonial County	District council	Website
Bedfordshire	Bedford	Official website
Bedfordshire	Central Bedfordshire	Official website
Berkshire	West Berkshire	Official website
Berkshire	Bracknell Forest	Official website
Berkshire	Windsor and Maidenhead	Official website
