= Egan House (Seattle) =

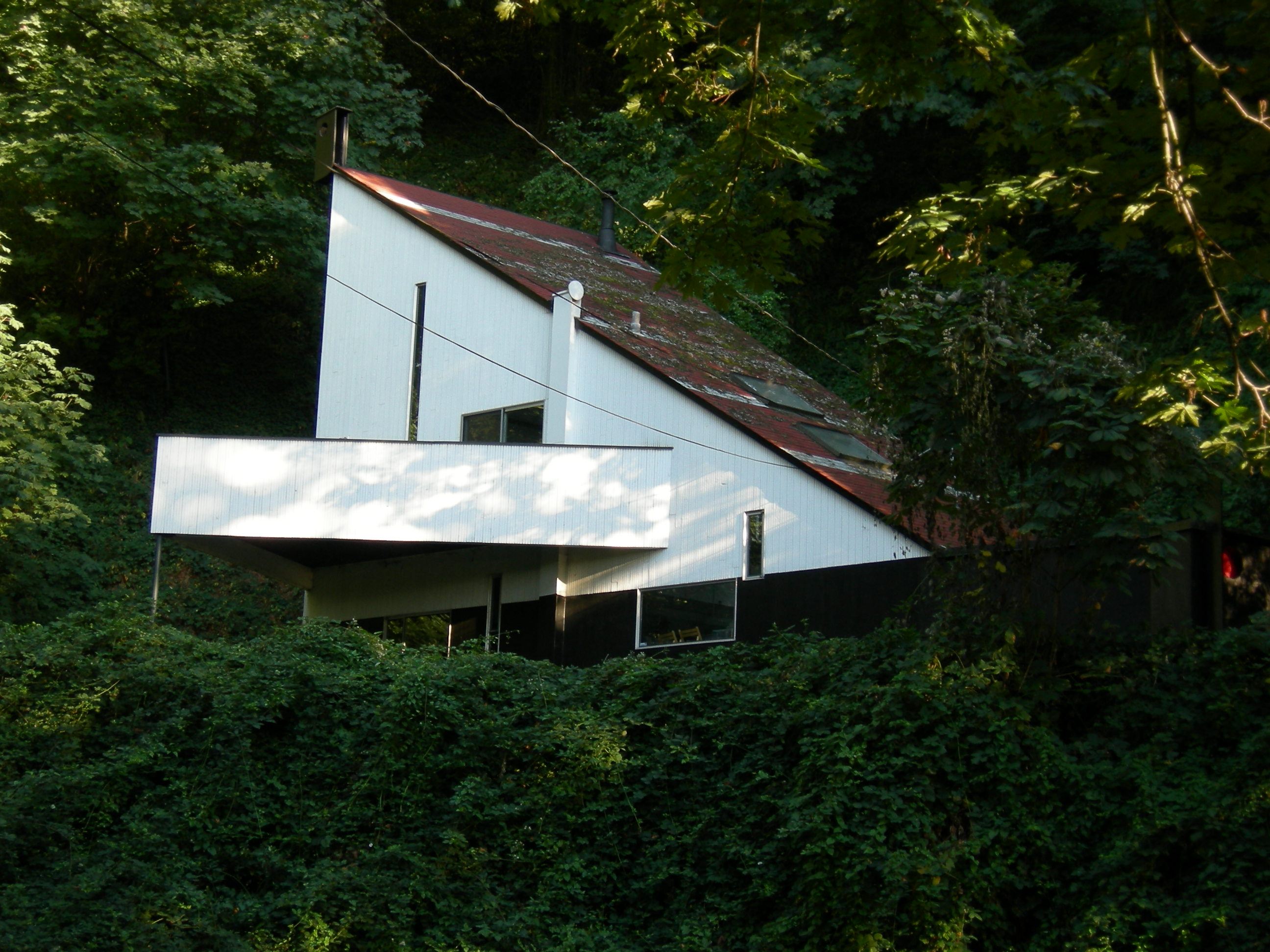
- Interactive map of the Egan House area

General information
- Type: Residence
- Architectural style: Northwest Regional
- Location: Capitol Hill (Seattle), 1500 Lakeview Blvd E, Seattle, Washington, United States
- Coordinates: 47.6324°N 122.3226°W
- Named for: USN Rear Admiral Willard Egan
- Renovated: 2003
- Cost: $10,762
- Renovation cost: $102,000
- Owner: Historic Seattle

Technical details
- Floor count: 3
- Floor area: 1,190 sq ft (111 m^{2})

Design and construction
- Architect: Robert Reichert
- Designations: Seattle Landmark, 2010

Egan House is a Northwest Regional style house in Seattle. It was designed by Robert Reichert in 1958 for retired United States Navy Rear Admiral Willard Egan. The public development authority Historic Seattle restored the house in 2003 and retained ownership of it, putting it up for sale in April 2024.It was designated a Seattle Landmark in 2010. The house lies within the St. Mark's Greenbelt.
