= Blaine Street Stairs =

Stairway in Seattle, Washington, U.S.

- Public stairway
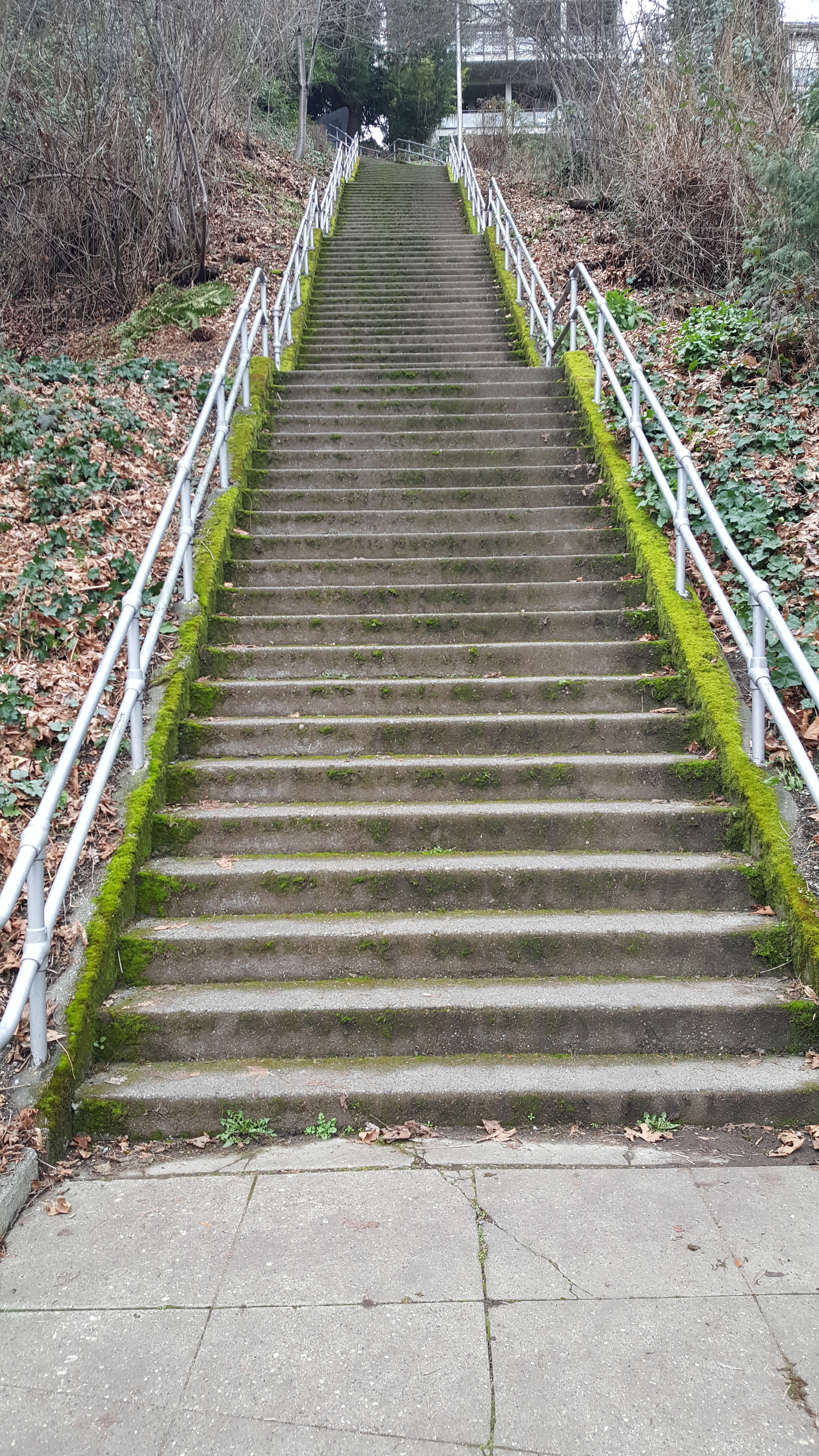
- The stairs in 2022
- Steps: 293
- Location: Seattle, Washington, United States
- Interactive map of Blaine Street Stairs
- Coordinates: 47.63502°N 122.3204°W

The Blaine Street Stairs are an outdoor staircase in Seattle's Capitol Hill neighborhood, in the United States. Adjacent to the Streissguth Gardens and parallel to the Howe Street Stairs, the staircase has 293 steps.

== See also ==
- Public stairways in Seattle
- Transportation in Seattle
