= Kingdome =

Multi-purpose stadium in Seattle, Washington (1976–2000)

- King County Stadium

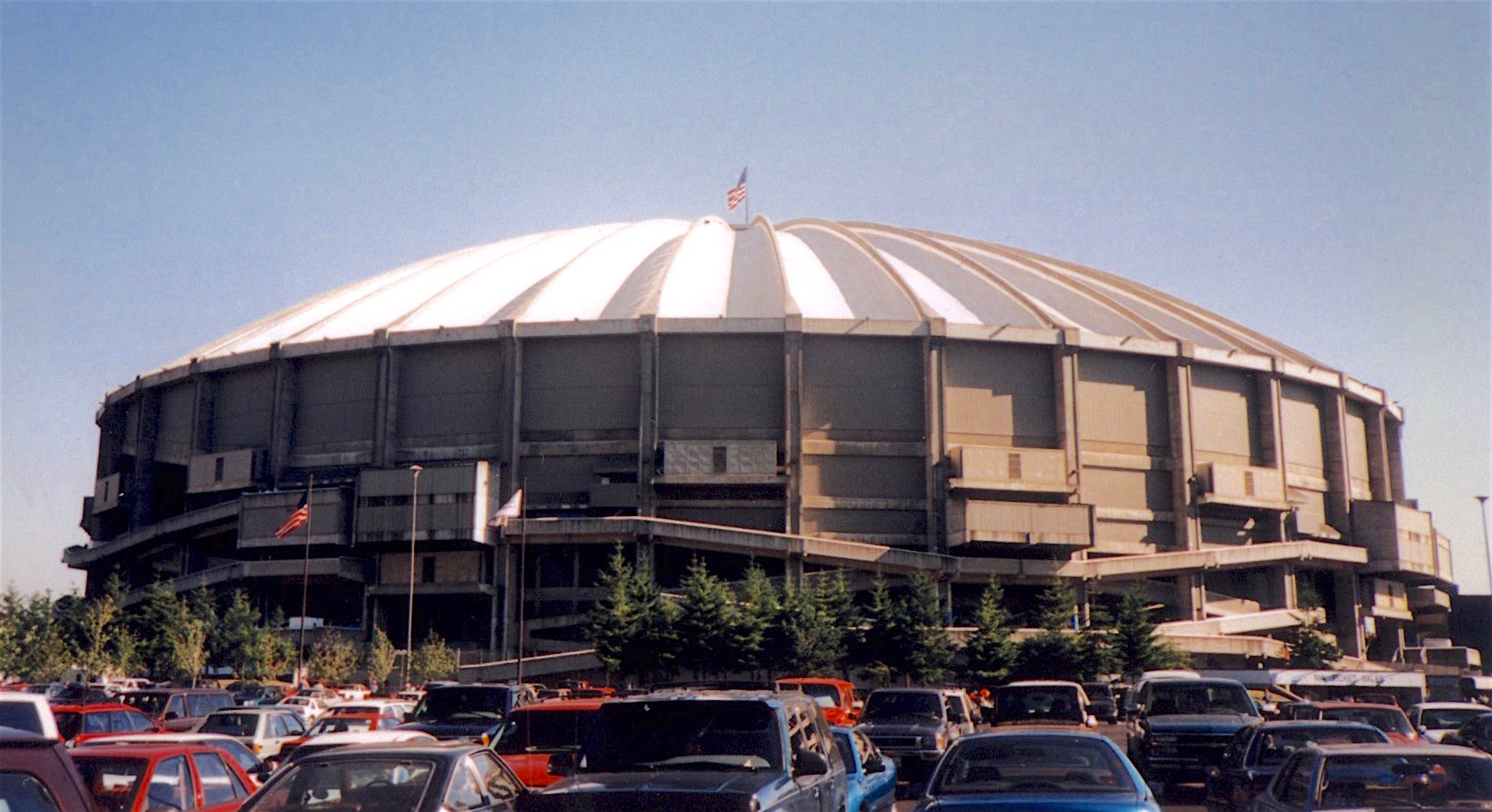
- Exterior of the Kingdome from the north parking lot in 1996
- Interactive map of Kingdome
- Full name: King County Stadium
- Address: 201 South King Street
- Location: Seattle, Washington, U.S.
- Coordinates: 47°35′43″N 122°19′53″W
- Owner: King County
- Operator: King County Department of Stadium Administration
- Capacity: Baseball: 59,166; Football: 66,400; Basketball: 40,192
- Executive suites: 46
- Surface: AstroTurf
- Scoreboard: Diamond Vision
- Public transit: King Street Station
- Parking: ~1,100 spaces

Construction
- Groundbreaking: November 2, 1972
- Opened: March 27, 1976
- Closed: January 9, 2000
- Demolished: March 26, 2000
- Cost: $67 million ($379 million in 2025 dollars)
- Architects: Naramore, Skilling & Praeger
- Structural engineer: Skilling, Helle, Christiansen & Robertson, Inc.
- General contractors: Donald M. Drake Company (1972–74); Peter Kiewit Sons Construction Company (1974–76)

Tenants
- Seattle Seahawks (NFL) (1976–1999); Seattle Sounders (NASL) (1976–1983); Seattle Mariners (MLB) (1977–1999); Seattle SuperSonics (NBA) (1978–1985)

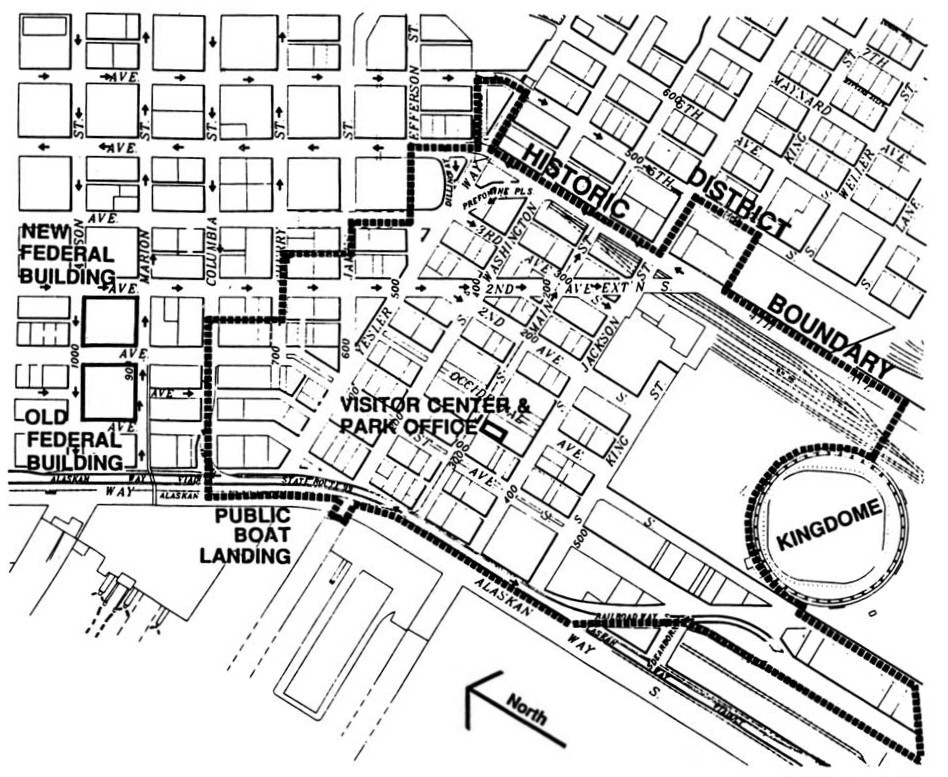
This 1996 map of the Pioneer Square-Skid Road Historic District shows the location of the Kingdome (at the lower right in the map).

The Kingdome (officially the King County Stadium) (Note: It was also legally known as the King County Multipurpose Domed Stadium, the King County Multipurpose Stadium, and the King County Domed Stadium.) was a multi-purpose stadium located in the Industrial District (later SoDo) neighborhood of Seattle, Washington, United States. Owned and operated by King County, it was the home stadium of the Seattle Seahawks of the National Football League (NFL) and the Seattle Mariners of Major League Baseball (MLB); it was also home to the Seattle SuperSonics of the National Basketball Association (NBA) from 1978 to 1985 and additionally served as both the home outdoor and indoor venue for the Seattle Sounders of the North American Soccer League (NASL). The Kingdome measured 660 feet (200 m) wide from its inside walls.

The idea of constructing a covered stadium for a major league football or baseball team was first proposed to Seattle officials in 1959. Voters rejected separate measures to approve public funding for such a stadium in 1960 and 1966, but the outcome was different in 1968; King County voters approved the issue of $40 million in municipal bonds to construct the stadium. Construction began in 1972 and the stadium opened in 1976 as the home of the Sounders and Seahawks. The Mariners moved in the following year, and the SuperSonics moved in the year after that, only to move back to the Seattle Center Coliseum in 1985. The stadium hosted several major sports events, including the Soccer Bowl in August 1976, the Pro Bowl in January 1977, the Major League Baseball All-Star Game in July 1979, the NBA All-Star Game in 1987, and the NCAA Final Four in 1984, 1989, and 1995.

During the 1990s, the Seahawks' and Mariners' respective ownership groups began to question the suitability of the Kingdome as a venue for each team, threatening to relocate unless new, publicly funded stadiums were built. An issue was that neither team saw their shared tenancy as profitable; both teams also questioned the integrity of the stadium's roof as highlighted by the collapse of ceiling tiles onto the seating area before a scheduled Mariners game in 1994. As a result, public funding packages for new, purpose-built stadiums for the Mariners and Seahawks were respectively approved in 1995 and 1997.

The Mariners moved to Safeco Field, now known as T-Mobile Park, midway through the 1999 season, and the Seahawks temporarily moved to Husky Stadium after the 1999 season. On March 26, 2000, the Kingdome was demolished by implosion. The Seahawks' new stadium, now known as Lumen Field, was built on the site and opened in 2002. King County finally paid off the bonds used to build and repair the Kingdome in 2015, fifteen years after its demolition.

== Concept and construction ==
=== First covered stadium proposals ===
In 1959, Seattle restaurateur David L. Cohn wrote a letter to the Seattle City Council suggesting the city needed a covered stadium for a major professional sports franchise. A domed stadium was thought to be a must because of Seattle's frequent rain. At the time, the city had Husky Stadium and Sick's Stadium for college football and minor league baseball, respectively, but both were deemed inadequate for a major league team.

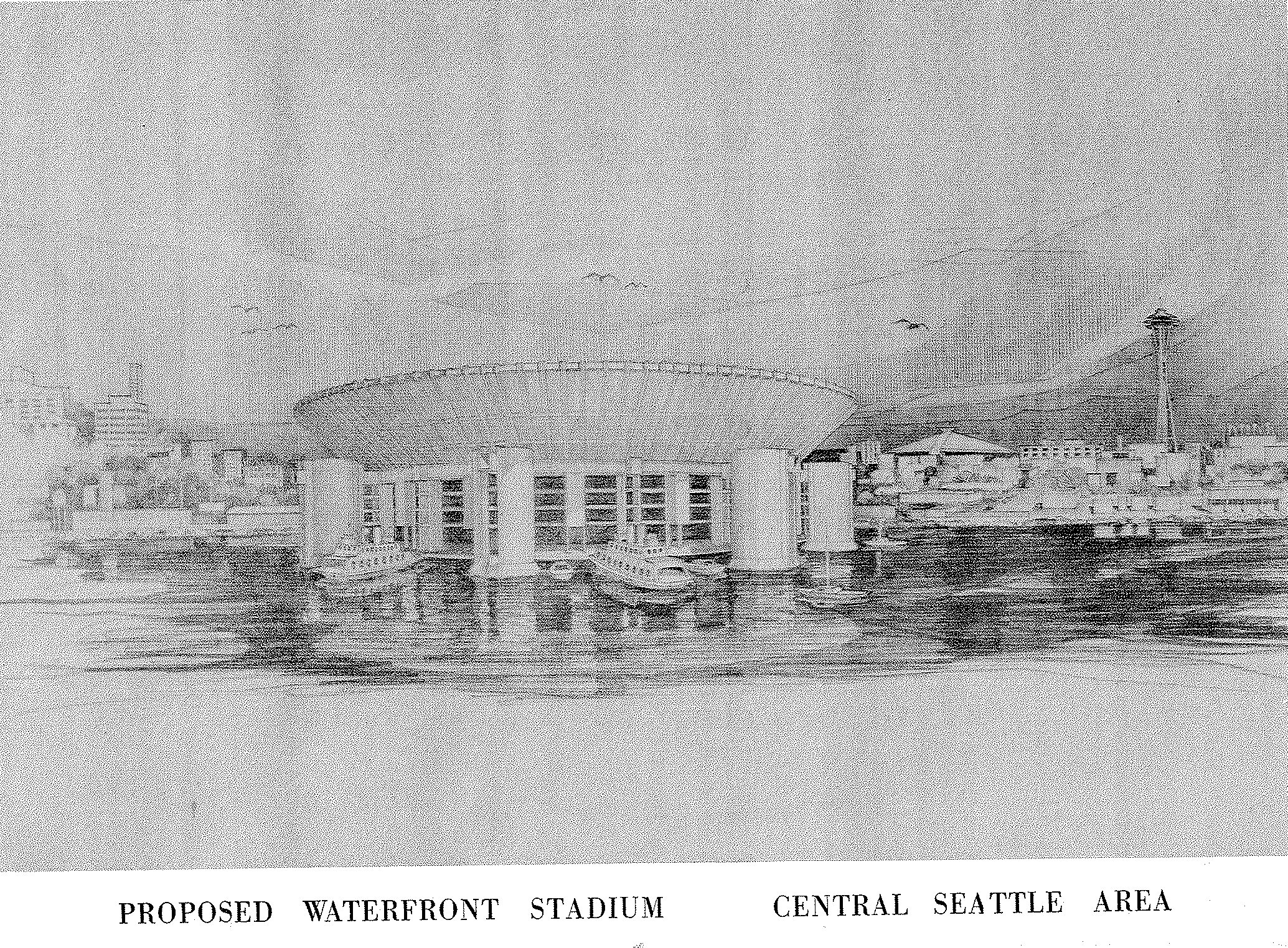
Concept drawing of a floating stadium on the Seattle waterfront, 1963

In 1960, King County commissioners placed a $15 million bond issue measure on the ballot to fund construction of a stadium, but voters on November 8 defeated it with only 48 percent approval because of doubt the stadium could be built within that budget, and lack of a guarantee the city would have a team to play in the stadium. By 1966, the National Football League and the American League were both considering granting the city an expansion franchise, and as a result, the King County Council placed another bond issue measure on the ballot for a September vote. While it received 51.5 percent approval, it did not reach the 60 percent required to proceed; the requirement was due to a 1932 initiative that mandated a supermajority for tax levies over 40 mills.

=== Seattle Pilots stadium conditions ===
In 1967, the American League granted Seattle an expansion franchise that would be known as the Seattle Pilots. The league clearly stated Sick's Stadium was not adequate as a major-league stadium, and stipulated that as a condition of being awarded the franchise, bonds had to be issued to fund construction of a domed stadium that had to be completed by 1970; additionally, the capacity at Sick's Stadium had to be expanded from 11,000 to 30,000 by Opening Day 1969, when the team was scheduled to begin playing. The Pilots were supposed to begin play in 1971 along with the Kansas City Royals. However, when Senator Stuart Symington of Missouri got wind of those plans, he demanded both teams begin play in 1969. The American League had birthed the Royals and Pilots as a result of the Kansas City Athletics moving to Oakland, and Symington would not accept the prospect of Kansas City waiting three years for baseball's return.

On February 13, 1968, King County voters approved the issue of $40 million in bonds to fund construction of the "King County Multipurpose Domed Stadium" with 62 percent in favor; it was part of the Forward Thrust group of bond propositions that, among other items, had a regional rapid transit system rejected. That year, a committee considered over 100 sites throughout Seattle and King County for the stadium; they unanimously decided the best site would be on the grounds of Seattle Center, site of the 1962 World's Fair. Community members decried the idea, claiming the committee was influenced by special interest groups.

The Pilots began play as planned in 1969, but Sick's Stadium proved to be a problematic venue for fans, media, and visiting players alike. The Pilots only drew 677,000 fans that season, not nearly enough to break even. It soon became apparent that the Pilots would not survive long enough to move to their new stadium without new ownership. It was also obvious that the timetable for a new stadium would have to be significantly advanced, as Sick's Stadium was unsuitable even for temporary use. However, a petition by stadium opponents brought the dome project to a halt. The Pilots' ownership group had run out of money by the end of the season, and with the stadium plans in limbo, the team was forced to declare bankruptcy. Despite efforts by Seattle-area businessmen to buy the team, as well as an attempt to keep the team in Seattle through the court system, the Pilots were sold to Milwaukee businessman Bud Selig, who relocated the team to Milwaukee and renamed it the Milwaukee Brewers a week before the start of the 1970 season.

=== Stadium construction and opposition ===
The stadium under construction circa 1973

Despite the lack of a major league sports team to occupy it, the push to build the domed stadium continued. In May 1970, voters rejected the proposal to build the stadium at Seattle Center. From 1970 to 1972, the commission studied the feasibility and economic impact of building the stadium on King Street adjacent to Pioneer Square and the International District—a site that ranked at the bottom when the commission originally narrowed the field of possible sites in 1968. This drew sharp opposition primarily from the International District community, which feared the impact of the stadium on neighborhood businesses located east of the site. They were worried about lost housing and parking, as well as higher pollution and property values. Peter Bacho and elderly residents of the district pursued a lawsuit to stop the stadium, but it was dismissed in 1972.

The King Street site was approved 8–1 by the county council in late 1971, and the groundbreaking ceremony in 1972 was held on November 2. A multiracial coalition of dozens of protesters, led by Bob Santos, attended the ceremony. These included University of Washington students, construction workers of color, and Chinatown-International District residents including many Manongs. They disrupted the speakers, and when some threw mud balls at King County Executive John Spellman and Councilman John O'Brien, the event ended early. Protests continued as a means to pressure the government into funding services for the neighborhood to offset stadium impacts. Activists eventually pushed Spellman into funding a health clinic in their neighborhood, followed by further services for the district.

In bidding for construction of the stadium, which had separate offers for the dome and the rest of the stadium, Donald M. Drake Construction Company of Portland, Oregon, was the winning contractor for both with respective bids of $28.9 million and $5.9 million. Peter Kiewit Sons Construction Company was the only other bidder, offering $30.57 million for the stadium and $5.8 million for the roof; the latter came with the caveat of the company using its own design consultant. To help alleviate tension between the International District community and county officials, Drake emphasized the hiring of minorities, with minorities eventually representing 13 percent of the workers at the site; a community center and a shelter were also built in the neighborhood. However, the stadium's construction encountered numerous issues; in January 1973, six support beams for the roof were toppled as one or two of them buckled, bringing down the others in a domino effect. By January 1974, the stadium reached 50 percent completion; only reaching 60 percent completion in July, it was clear that Drake would not reach the December deadline at that point. It was also apparent that Drake was ill-prepared to work on a project with such scale, with numerous errors, delays, and short-staffing slowing down construction. Efforts to renegotiate the contract failed, and on November 22, Drake stopped work on the Kingdome. The county fired Drake on December 10, bringing in Kiewit to finish construction on the stadium.

=== Stadium completion and Seahawks arrival ===
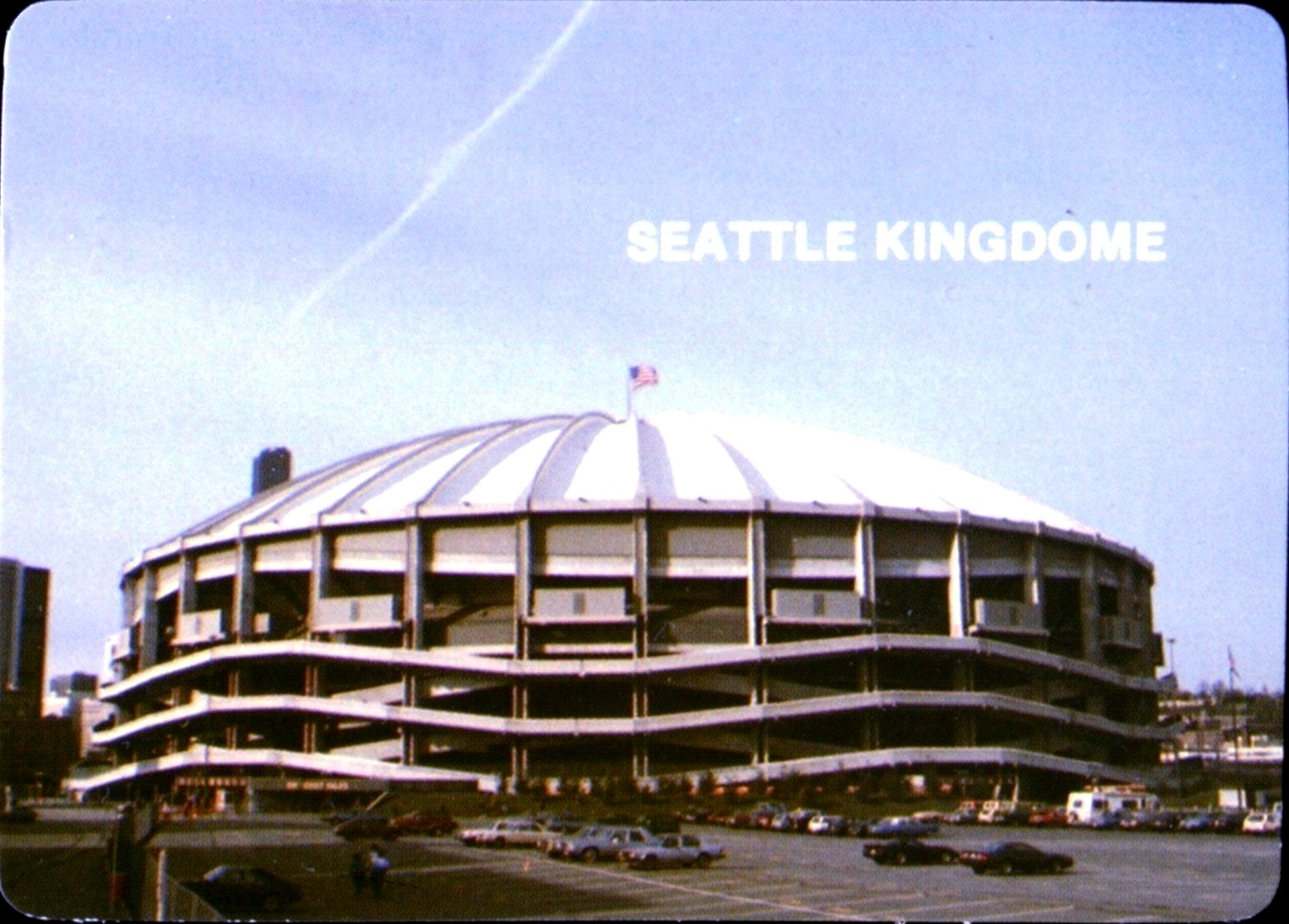
Exterior of the Kingdome in 1985.

After Ralph Wilson's threats to move the Buffalo Bills to Seattle came to naught with the construction of Rich Stadium, on December 5, 1974, the NFL awarded Seattle an expansion franchise to occupy the new stadium; the team was later named the Seattle Seahawks. Construction lasted another two years, and the stadium held an opening ceremony on March 27, 1976. It hosted its first professional sporting event two weeks later on April 9, an exhibition soccer game between the Seattle Sounders and New York Cosmos of the NASL. It set a record for the largest soccer audience in North America at 58,120. The stadium was finished at $20 million over budget, with part of the cost overrun covered by a $12.8 million out-of-court settlement in 1980 between the county and Drake's liability insurers.

== Surface ==
Like virtually all other multi-purpose stadiums, the Kingdome featured AstroTurf artificial turf for its playing surface, with its baseball configuration featuring dirt sliding pits around each base. When it was constructed, artificial turf was considered a must because the roof was likely to inhibit the growth of natural grass, like the Astrodome's roof.

The AstroTurf surface was first replaced in July 1983 during the MLB All-Star break; Monsanto, the then-owner of AstroTurf, won the turf replacement contract over SuperTurf (then used by the Metrodome) with a bid of $1.2 million. By request of the Mariners and Seahawks, it was replaced again in October and December 1990 at a cost of $2.56 million; the previous surface was sold off thereafter, with 25 rolls of it sold to the Tacoma Dome for $108,200. A strip 40 feet by 4 inches was ripped off left field near second base during a field invasion by celebrating fans after the Mariners won the AL West tiebreaker game in 1995; it was replaced before the first Mariners home game in the ALDS.

Before the 1990 replacement, the AstroTurf surface was converted from baseball to football configuration via the covering of the infield with turf strips; a one-piece surface was placed over the infield after the conclusion of the Mariners season. The surface was attached together via both Velcro and Ziploc fasteners. After the 1990 replacement, separate surfaces were installed for each team; the Seahawks specifically wanted a stiffer variation of AstroTurf. The replacement surfaces were attached together via zippers.

The underlying base of the surface was asphalt, with the AstroTurf essentially consisting of a carpet on top of a pad with respective thicknesses of one-half inch and five-eights inch. Lumps, holes, and ridges were also present in the surface along with gaps within its seams. These factors combined to create a playing surface that was despised by both football and baseball players alike; after the 1998 season, a survey by the NFL Players Association found that 56.7 percent of Seahawks players rated the surface as "poor" or "fair", and was the worst-rated one in the AFC West.

Injuries from playing at the Kingdome and its contemporaries occurred more often compared to stadiums with natural grass. Of note, Seahawks running backs Sherman Smith and Curt Warner respectively suffered season-ending knee injuries in 1980 and 1984 during games at the Kingdome; additionally, the Kingdome's surface is partly blamed for Ken Griffey Jr.'s subsequent injuries and decline in performance after the Mariners traded him to the Cincinnati Reds at the end of the 1999 season.

== Football ==
=== Seahawks ===
The expansion Seattle Seahawks of the National Football League (NFL) played their first game ever on August 1, 1976, a preseason game against the San Francisco 49ers at the Kingdome in which they lost 27–20 before a crowd of 60,825. The Seahawks' first regular season game was against the St. Louis Cardinals at the Kingdome on September 12. The Cardinals defeated the Seahawks, 30–24, with 58,441 fans in attendance. At the end of that season, the venue hosted the Pro Bowl, the NFL's all-star game, on January 17, 1977.

The Seahawks hosted Monday Night Football games at the Kingdome twelve times in their history and were 9–3 in those games. The Seahawks and the Oakland/Los Angeles Raiders played five Monday Night games in the Kingdome in the 1980s with Seattle holding a 3–2 edge including a 37–0 blowout victory in 1986. The next year, in 1987, Bo Jackson of the Los Angeles Raiders rushed for 221 yards, the most ever on MNF, and scored 2 touchdowns. One of his scores was a 91-yard touchdown and the other was a historic plowing into Seahawks high-profile rookie linebacker Brian "The Boz" Bosworth.

The Seahawks regularly sold out games at the Kingdome from its inception and throughout the 1980s; 117 consecutive regular-season home games were sold out between 1979 and 1993. However, after Ken Behring took over ownership of the team from the Nordstrom family in 1988, the team began to decline in performance; after winning the AFC West that year, it suffered a franchise-worst 2–14 record in 1992. Season ticket sales, which had reached 62,000 that year with a waiting list of 30,000, gradually decreased to 46,000 in 1995, with the team averaging 46,218 in attendance over five games at the Kingdome in 1994; as a result, the Seahawks began failing to sell out games, resulting in their blackout in the Seattle market. After the blackout of the October 24, 1993 game versus the New England Patriots, one more game was blacked out that year, with five games blacked out the following year; KING-TV, which as Seattle's NBC affiliate was the Seahawks' local broadcast home at the time, prevented further blackouts by purchasing all remaining unsold tickets for three games in 1993 and two games in 1994.

In the Seahawks' heyday, the Kingdome was known as one of the loudest stadiums in the league. Opposing teams were known to practice with jet engine sounds blaring at full blast to prepare for the painfully high decibel levels typical of Seahawks games. It was where Seahawks fans, who were long called "the 12th Man" and led the Seahawks to retire the number 12 in honor of them in 1984, made their reputation as one of the most ravenous fan bases in the NFL, a reputation that has carried over to what is now Lumen Field. The Kingdome's reputation contributed to the NFL's 1989 vote in favor of enacting a rule penalizing home teams for excessive crowd noise; it was especially loathed by Seahawks fans during preseason games, with fan displeasure throughout the league leading commissioner Pete Rozelle to soften enforcement of the rule before the start of the regular season. Raucous Seahawks fans at the Kingdome were also some of the earliest performers of The Wave.

The city of Seattle made numerous bids to host the Super Bowl during the Seahawks' tenure at the Kingdome. However, despite five bids over 12 years, the Kingdome was never awarded the opportunity to host a Super Bowl; its closest chance was in 1989 for Super Bowl XXVI, which was awarded to the Hubert H. Humphrey Metrodome in Minneapolis, Minnesota. In its 1982 bid for Super Bowl XIX, the Seattle City Council voted to give tax exemptions to the NFL if the league selected the Kingdome to host the game.

The Seahawks played their final game at the Kingdome on January 9, 2000, suffering a first-round playoff loss to the Miami Dolphins in their first playoff appearance since the 1988 season. The Dolphins scored a fourth-quarter touchdown to win 20–17; it marked the first home playoff loss for the Seahawks as well as the first road playoff win in 28 years for the Dolphins. It was the last NFL victory for Hall of Fame quarterback Dan Marino and head coach Jimmy Johnson, and it was also the last event the Kingdome ever hosted before its implosion. The Seahawks had an overall record of 101–83 (.549) in the Kingdome, and were 2–1 in the postseason.

=== Amateur ===
==== College ====
The first football (and college football by extension) game played in the Kingdome occurred just after it opened in 1976, when the Washington Huskies varsity team won 10–7 against a team of Husky alumni on May 1 before 20,470 fans. The Huskies looked into temporarily renting the Kingdome for the 1987 season when the north grandstand of Husky Stadium collapsed during construction on February 25; however, the Kingdome was ultimately not needed as the grandstand was completed in time for the team's first home game against the Stanford Cardinal on September 5. (Seven years later, the Seattle Seahawks would use Husky Stadium as their home field during the first half of the 1994 season while the Kingdome's ceiling was under repair.)

The Kingdome also hosted a game between the Washington State Cougars and USC Trojans on October 9, 1976. With 37,268 in attendance, USC running back Ricky Bell rushed for 346 yards and set the Pac-8 single-game rushing record; the Trojans won by nine points, 23–14. In 1994, under then-new athletic director Rick Dickson, the Cougars flirted with the idea of hosting an additional home game at the Kingdome starting in 1997; however, the plan never came to fruition.

In the late 1970s, the Kingdome hosted both instances of a Pacific-10 Conference all-star game called the Challenge Bowl; the bowl, sponsored by the Olympia Brewing Company, pitted an all-star team of Pac-10 players against a similar team from another conference. The Pac-10 went undefeated with a 27–20 victory (as the Pac-8) over the Big Ten on January 15, 1978, and a 36–23 victory over the Big Eight on January 13, 1979.

During the same period, the University of Puget Sound Loggers and Pacific Lutheran University Lutes also faced off at the Kingdome twice; the Loggers won both contests, defeating the Lutes 23–21 on September 17, 1977, with 13,167 in attendance, and then defeating them again 27–14 on September 23, 1978, before a crowd of 8,329. The 1977 game set a series attendance record at the time.

==== Other levels ====
The stadium also hosted the annual WIAA high school football state championships in an event called the Kingbowl from 1977 through 1994; the title games were moved to the Tacoma Dome in nearby Tacoma in 1995.

The Seattle and Tacoma Police Departments played a yearly game named the Bacon Bowl to raise money for charity from 1980 to 2005; the Kingdome hosted it from the beginning until 1982, then had a one-off in 1985 during a nine-year span in which the Tacoma Dome hosted the rest of the games. The Kingdome hosted the game again from 1992 to 1994 before it returned to the Tacoma Dome; the game came back for one final time in 1999 before the stadium was demolished.

== Baseball ==
Shortly after the Pilots' departure for Milwaukee, the city of Seattle, King County, and the state of Washington sued the American League, claiming a breach of contract. The league agreed to grant Seattle another franchise in exchange for dropping the lawsuit, and the team that would later be known as the Seattle Mariners was born.

The Mariners held their first game in franchise history at the Kingdome on April 6, 1977, against the California Angels. The Angels shut out the Mariners 7–0 in front of a sellout crowd of 57,762. The first pitch was a strike thrown by the Mariners' Diego Seguí to Jerry Remy. (Note: Incidentally, Seguí was a relief pitcher for the Pilots in their first game when they faced the Angels at Anaheim Stadium on April 8, 1969.) In the top of the first inning, Don Baylor registered the first hit at the stadium with a double that scored Remy, who had stolen second and third base after drawing a walk from Seguí. The Mariners' first batter, Dave Collins, struck out; however, the next batter, José Báez, singled for the franchise's first ever hit. The first home run at the venue was hit in the top of the third inning by Joe Rudi; designated hitter Juan Bernhardt scored the Mariners' first home run in their fifth game at the Kingdome on April 10. The Mariners had their first win at the Kingdome and team history two games after the opener (they were also shut out in their second game 2–0), defeating the Angels 7–6 on April 8 via a walk-off double from Larry Milbourne. The venue hosted the All-Star Game on July 17, 1979.

The Kingdome was somewhat problematic as a baseball venue. Foul territory was quite large, and seats in the upper deck as far as 617 feet (188 m) from home plate. Part of the problem was that the Kingdome was not a multipurpose stadium in the truest sense. Instead, it was built as a football stadium that could convert into a baseball stadium. For instance, most fans in the outfield seats on the 300 level were unable to see parts of right and center field; these areas were not part of the football playing field.

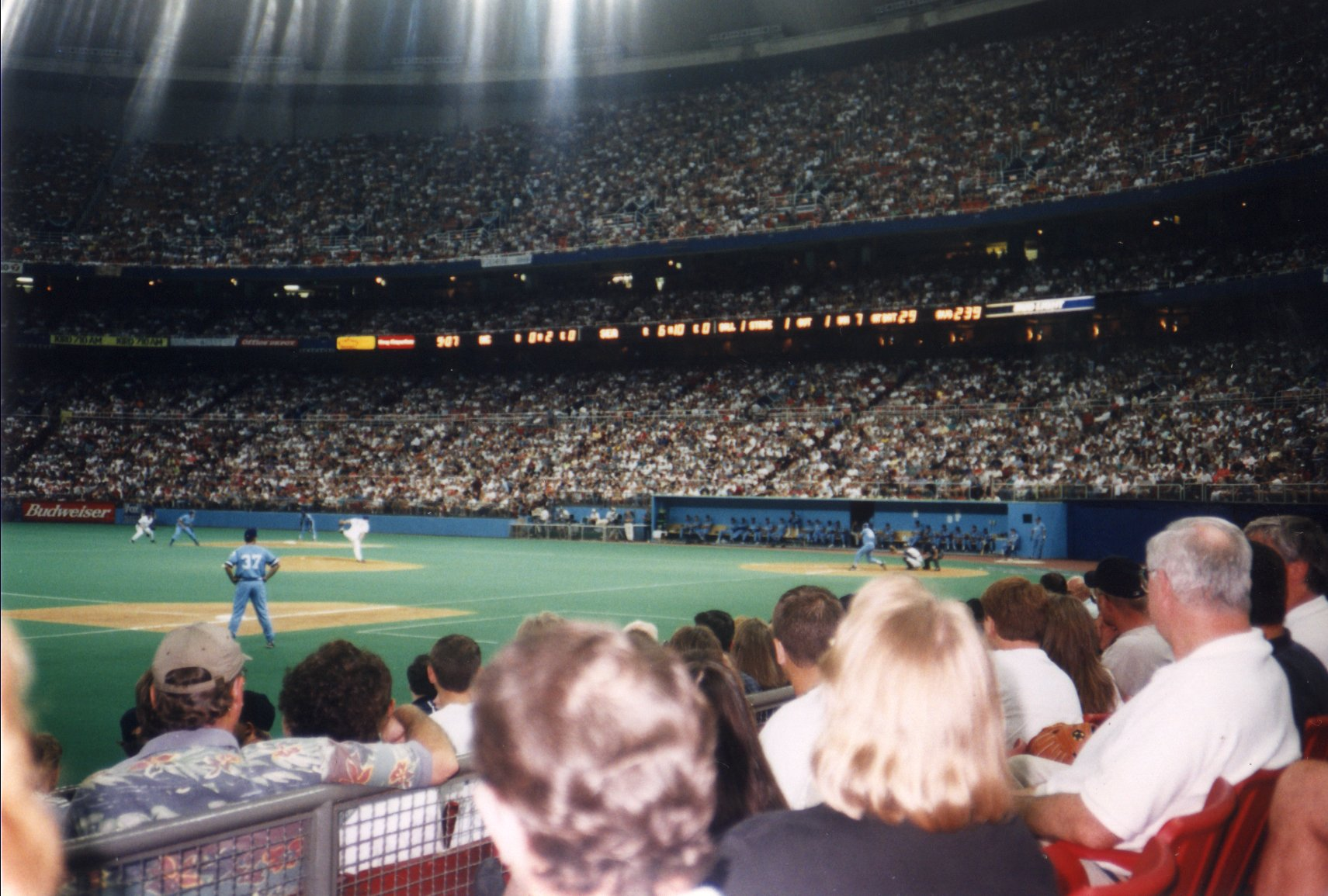
Hosting the Kansas City Royals in July 1997

For most of the Mariners' first 18 years, their poor play (they did not have a winning season until 1991) combined with the Kingdome's design, led to poor attendance. Some writers and fans called it "the Tomb" (because of its gray concrete and lack of noise) and "Puget Puke." After their inaugural home opener, the Mariners didn't have another sellout for the next 1,018 home games, until their 1990 home opener on April 13. At one point the Mariners covered seats in the upper decks in right and right-center with a tarp in order to make the stadium feel "less empty". Additionally, the Kingdome's acoustics created problems for stadium announcers, who had to deal with significant echo issues. However, when the team's fortunes began to change in the mid-1990s and they began drawing larger crowds, especially in the post-season, the noise created an electric atmosphere and gave the home team a distinct advantage similar to the effect on football games. The average attendance of 22,064 in 1995 was the lowest in three years with the removal of nine home games for the season, but when put in perspective, it was still higher compared to any of the Mariners' first 14 seasons.

Despite its cavernous interior, the Kingdome's field dimensions were relatively small. It had a reputation as a hitter's park, especially in the 1990s when Ken Griffey Jr., Edgar Martínez, Jay Buhner, Alex Rodriguez, and other sluggers played there.

The large number of in-play objects—speakers, roof support wires and streamers—contributed to an "arena baseball" feel.

In its early years, the outfield was symmetrical with a uniform wall height: deep in center, and short elsewhere. For the All-Star Game in 1979, center field was 410 feet (120 m), power alleys were 357 feet (109 m), and the foul lines were 316 feet (96 m); the unpadded wall was green with a top yellow stripe, approximately twelve feet (3.7 m) in height and did not have the power alley distances listed on it. Down the lines, the distance was also listed in fathoms (52.7 fm), presumably to maintain a nautical theme in line with the team name; however, this practice was ditched after the 1980 season. Like the Kingdome's contemporaries, the bullpens were located in foul territory adjacent to the baselines and the stands.

The Kingdome was somewhat improved in 1982 with the addition of a 23-foot (7.0 m) wall in right field nicknamed the "Walla Walla" (after the city in southeastern Washington); a nearly $100,000 Daktronics out-of-town scoreboard was later installed on it in 1990. In 1990 and 1991, the moving of home plate closer to the backstop, the addition of box seats down the third base line and the removal of a few rows of seats in left field reduced foul territory and made the outfield dimensions longer and asymmetrical.

The longest game in the Kingdome took place on July 30, 1998, when the Cleveland Indians defeated the Mariners 9–8 in 17 innings via a three-run homer from Manny Ramirez off Bob Wells; Paul Shuey staved off a comeback by the Mariners in the bottom of the inning to end the game the next morning after five hours and 23 minutes.

The most noteworthy baseball game in the Kingdome's history took place on October 8, 1995; in the rubber game of the ALDS, the Mariners defeated the New York Yankees 6–5 in 11 innings in front of 57,411 raucous fans. In the bottom of the 11th, Martinez doubled to left, sending Joey Cora and Griffey home with the winning runs and vaulting the Mariners into the ALCS for the first time in franchise history.

On May 2, 1996, a minor earthquake caused a game at the Kingdome between the Mariners and the Cleveland Indians to be suspended with the Mariners trailing the Indians 6–3 in the bottom of the seventh inning. The earthquake, estimated at a magnitude of 5.3 to 5.4, occurred during a pitching change as Indians' pitcher Orel Hershiser was walking off the mound following a home run by Edgar Martínez. After an inspection by engineers, the game was continued the next evening; Paul Sorrento hit a solo home run in the ninth inning for Seattle after the game resumed, but the Mariners ultimately lost 6–4 to the Indians.

Seguí, who retired from professional baseball after the 1977 season, was invited by the Mariners to throw the ceremonial last pitch after the final Mariners game at the Kingdome in 1999. However, while they were able to make the tickets and reservations for Seguí, a payment mix-up prevented him from boarding the flight out of Kansas City International Airport on the day of the game; the incident made him irate such that he refused to visit Seattle again until 2012, when he was invited as part of the Mariners' 35th anniversary celebration. Despite the disappointment from Seguí's son, then-Mariners first baseman David Segui, the ceremony went on as planned; David's son, then-seven-year-old Cory Segui, threw the last pitch to Bob Stinson, who was the Mariners' catcher in their first game.

In 1989, Griffey Jr. hit a home run in his first-ever plate appearance at the Kingdome on April 10. On June 27, 1999, Griffey Jr. hit the last home run ever at the Kingdome against the Texas Rangers. The Mariners played 1,755 games at the Kingdome, compiling an overall home record of 852–903 (.485) during their 22½-season tenure there.

== Basketball ==
=== SuperSonics ===
In 1980, the Seattle SuperSonics total attendance exceeded that of all other sports or shows held in the Kingdome.

Besides the Mariners and Seahawks, the stadium also hosted the Seattle SuperSonics of the National Basketball Association (NBA) for seven seasons. The SuperSonics, having previously played at the Seattle Center Coliseum, announced on July 29, 1977, that they intended to move into the Kingdome for the 1978–79 season after the expiration of their contract with the city of Seattle, the owner of the Coliseum; the team pushed for a move to the Kingdome after the city balked at a $30 million plan to expand the Coliseum to 20,000 seats the previous year. On August 22, the King County Council voted 7–2 to approve a 17-year lease with the SuperSonics, with the agreement signed the following day. The following week, the council unanimously voted on August 29 to spend $1.5 million on improvements to the Kingdome in preparation for the team; the team would pay the same amount over the first seven years as part of the agreement. Additional terms of the agreement had the SuperSonics pay the county 10 percent of ticket sale proceeds (not including admissions taxes) and $2,539 in personnel costs per game; the county additionally kept all game concession and parking revenue. On the same day as the agreement signing, longtime Kingdome critic Frank Ruano filed a referendum petition in an attempt to halt the move, but he announced on September 17 that he would withdraw support from the petition for lack of support.

While the SuperSonics had played a few games at the Kingdome over the previous two seasons, their full-time tenancy required the addition of 5,000 portable stadium seats added onto the floor of the arena as well as additional scoreboards and a new basketball court. The center circle of the court was positioned over first base, with the court itself laid parallel and adjacent to the right-field seats; the portable seats were positioned across the court with one end hovering over home plate.

The first SuperSonics game in the Kingdome under the agreement was an exhibition game versus the Portland Trail Blazers on September 22, 1978. A few weeks later, a crowd of 15,219 watched as the SuperSonics defeated the Chicago Bulls, 104–86, on October 14 in their first regular-season game as a tenant. Captain Fred Brown and leading scorer Gus Williams helped lead the team to their first and only championship that season, defeating the Washington Bullets in the Finals and avenging their Finals loss to them the previous season. At the time, the Kingdome was known in the NBA for being the noisiest arena for basketball and for having the largest crowds, with stadium vendor Bill Scott (a.k.a. Bill the Beerman) taking the duties as cheerleader.

In the 1979–80 season, the SuperSonics set an NBA record average attendance of 21,725 fans per game (since broken). The SuperSonics set the NBA single-game playoff attendance record at 39,457 during Game 4 of the 1978 NBA Finals; they set it again on April 15, 1980, during a conference semifinal game against the Milwaukee Bucks with an attendance record of 40,172 (also since broken). The Kingdome regular season, single-game attendance record of 38,067 was set on November 22, 1991, when the SuperSonics faced the Chicago Bulls.

While leaving a SuperSonics game on February 16, 1983, a 21-year-old man from Olympia fell off a ramp and plunged 47 feet to his death; this was despite the installation of signs warning about the chest-level barriers the previous year.

Logistics would be a problem throughout the team's tenure at the Kingdome because the Seahawks and Mariners had scheduling priority over them, especially during the playoffs when the Mariners were playing there at the same time in the spring. As part of the 1977 agreement, King County agreed to pay the SuperSonics $15,000 for each game (up to five) that was moved elsewhere because of booking issues. Even then, the scheduling priority meant that the SuperSonics would only play home playoff games at the Kingdome while the Mariners were on the road, with most of the games played at the Coliseum; the team even had to use Hec Edmundson Pavilion at the University of Washington for a few games when both the Kingdome and the Coliseum were unavailable.

Along with the scheduling issues, as with other multipurpose stadiums used by the NBA the Kingdome proved itself to be a less-than-ideal venue for basketball. Although the Kingdome's capacity allowed the SuperSonics to set attendance records, the vast space it afforded meant that it did not have the intimate environment of a dedicated arena; furthermore, fans were displeased about the poor sight lines and cold temperatures in the Kingdome. All these factors, plus dwindling attendance due to poor team performance towards the end of their tenancy at the Kingdome, led SuperSonics general manager Zollie Volchok to sign a 10-year contract with the city of Seattle in 1983, agreeing to have the team move back to the Coliseum after the 1984–85 season in exchange for upgrades there.

The SuperSonics faced the Phoenix Suns at the Kingdome on April 7, 1985, in their final game as a regular tenant, losing 110–125 with 5,672 in attendance. However, exemplifying the scheduling issues, it was not their final home game of the season; the SuperSonics were forced to play at the Tacoma Dome on April 11 because the Mariners hosted the Oakland Athletics at the Kingdome that day. By that point, the SuperSonics had an average attendance of 7,399, failing to surpass 10,000 seats sold in 29 of 37 games held at the Kingdome in their final season there.

Despite calling the Coliseum home again, the SuperSonics still played occasionally at the Kingdome over the next few years when large crowds were anticipated; as such, the SuperSonics hosted the 1987 NBA All-Star Game there, having previously hosted the 1974 game at the Coliseum before the Kingdome opened. However, SuperSonics owner Barry Ackerley, who had bought the team from Sam Schulman in October 1983 after the Coliseum deal was signed, started seeking a new arena for them in 1989; team president Bob Whitsitt claimed that the Coliseum was outdated and leaking. Ackerley proposed to build a new arena south of the Kingdome (where T-Mobile Park stands today), but the plan was initially rejected by King County because of objections from the Seahawks and Mariners over inadequate parking. The plan was eventually approved by the Seattle City Council 7–1 on May 30, 1990, but it was ultimately scrapped the following year on June 26 because of issues in financing it; as a compromise measure, the Coliseum was rebuilt as KeyArena during the 1994–95 season, with the SuperSonics playing home games at the Tacoma Dome instead of the closer Kingdome in the meantime. The SuperSonics played at KeyArena until they were controversially relocated to Oklahoma City by owner Clay Bennett after the 2007–08 season.

The SuperSonics played 303 games at the Kingdome in total, including 14 playoff games; they held an overall record of 208–95 (.686) and a playoff record of 8–6 (.571) at the stadium. Of those games, 20 of them had attendances of 30,000 or more.

=== College ===
The first men's college basketball game at the Kingdome was held on January 9, 1984, when the Washington Huskies defeated the Notre Dame Fighting Irish, 63–61, in the second overtime in front of 7,466 fans. The Huskies held their only other basketball game at the Kingdome more than a decade later, defeating the Old Dominion Monarchs 71–61 on December 22, 1994, with 4,187 in attendance.

The only women's basketball game at the Kingdome was held on December 6, 1979, when the Soviet national team beat Seattle University 135-45, before 7,239 spectators.

==== Final Four ====
The NCAA Final Four of men's college basketball was held three times at the Kingdome, with the stadium hosting the 1984, 1989, and 1995 editions. The 1984 championship game saw the Georgetown Hoyas defeat the Houston Cougars, 84–75. Meanwhile, the 1989 championship game had the Michigan Wolverines beat the Seton Hall Pirates, 80–79, in overtime because of a controversial last-second foul call against the Pirates. Finally, with the 1995 championship game, the UCLA Bruins defeated the Arkansas Razorbacks, 89–78, to win their first championship since the retirement of coach John Wooden twenty years earlier in 1975.

The Kingdome was not the first venue in Seattle to host the Final Four; Hec Edmundson Pavilion had previously hosted it in 1949 and 1952. However, the Kingdome is credited with helping shape the Final Four into an event with a stature comparable to that of the Super Bowl because of its large capacity. It was the only such capable venue on the West Coast of the United States; the last time a non-Seattle West Coast site hosted the game was when the Los Angeles Memorial Sports Arena hosted it in 1972. The 1995 edition was the last time that Seattle hosted a Final Four, and it will likely remain that way for the foreseeable future since the Kingdome's successors were not designed with a controlled environment in mind; it also remains the last time that the Final Four was held on the West Coast. The Final Four was not held again in the Western United States until 2017, when University of Phoenix Stadium in Glendale, Arizona, hosted it for the Phoenix area.

=== Other ===
On February 18, 1979, the Harlem Globetrotters held an exhibition game at the Kingdome with close to 23,000 in attendance, of which around 3,500 were under 12 years old.

As a result of the boycott of the 1980 Summer Olympics by the United States, the U.S. Olympic team faced off against a squad of NBA players in a six-game exhibition tournament called the "Gold Medal Series" that June. On June 20, the NBA All-Stars defeated the U.S. Olympic team, 78–76, before a crowd of 10,902; it was the only victory by the NBA squad in the tournament.

The Washington Interscholastic Activities Association (WIAA) held their 3A and 4A high school basketball state tournament five times at the Kingdome between 1993 and 1999. The boys' and girls' games were held simultaneously until the championship, at which point they took turns playing on a single court.

== Soccer ==
=== Sounders ===
The Seattle Sounders of the North American Soccer League (NASL) were the first tenant to move into the Kingdome upon its opening, having played at Memorial Stadium for their first two seasons. As a result, they held the honor of hosting the first sporting event at the Kingdome with an exhibition game versus the New York Cosmos on April 9, 1976; the Cosmos defeated them 3–1 with 58,128 fans in attendance. Highlighting the secondary treatment of the Sounders, about 5,000 seats were not yet installed when the game occurred. Just weeks later, they hosted their first regular-season game in the Kingdome on April 26, defeating the Portland Timbers 1–0 via a Geoff Hurst penalty kick in the second overtime before 24,983 spectators.

The largest crowd to attend a Sounders match, regular or postseason, occurred on August 25, 1977, when 56,256 spectators watched as they defeated the Los Angeles Aztecs 1–0 in the second game of the Pacific Conference Final to advance to their first Soccer Bowl. The Sounders' regular-season attendance record was set on August 9, 1980, when the Cosmos defeated them 1–0 in front of 49,606 fans. Overall, the team drew an average attendance of 20,183 from 1975 to 1982, peaking in the 1980 season with an average attendance of 24,247.

Along with traditional soccer, the Sounders participated in NASL indoor soccer for the 1980–81 and 1981–82 seasons. However, the 1983 outdoor season proved to be a dire one for the Sounders; with the team's front office heavily cutting costly foreign players from the roster, the team suffered their worst season ever performance-wise, resulting in a record low average attendance of 8,181. That season additionally saw the smallest crowd to attend a Sounders game, with only 4,270 spectators on hand to witness their 3–1 victory over the Tulsa Roughnecks on July 27. With the cuts not enough to keep the team afloat, the owners ultimately elected to fold it that year on September 6; their final home game was a 3–2 victory over the San Diego Sockers on August 25 with 7,331 fans in attendance.

=== College ===
The Kingdome hosted the NCAA Division I Men's Soccer Championship Finals twice in consecutive years. The final on December 17, 1984, featured the Clemson Tigers, coached by Dr. I. M. Ibrahim, and defending national champion Indiana Hoosiers, headed by coach Jerry Yeagley; 7,926 spectators watched as the Tigers won 2–1 in regulation to bring home their first national championship in soccer and deny the Hoosiers a third straight title. A year later, on December 14, 1985, a crowd of 5,986 watched as the UCLA Bruins defeated the American Eagles 1–0 after eight overtime periods to win their first national soccer championship; Bruin coach Sigi Schmid went on to coach the Seattle Sounders FC of Major League Soccer (MLS), a phoenix club of the NASL Sounders, from its inaugural season in 2009 to 2016.

=== Other professional games ===
A game of the 1976 U.S.A. Bicentennial Cup tournament was held at the Kingdome on May 28, with Brazil defeating Team America 2–0 before 20,245 spectators.

The Kingdome also hosted the NASL's championship game, the Soccer Bowl, between the Minnesota Kicks and the Toronto Metros-Croatia on August 28, 1976; the Metros-Croatia defeated the Kicks 3–0 before a crowd of 25,765, setting an NASL championship attendance record at the time.

A CONCACAF Championship qualifier for the 1978 FIFA World Cup was hosted at the Kingdome on October 20, 1976; the game, which saw the United States defeat Canada 2–0 before a crowd of 17,675, was the first instance of a World Cup qualifier that was held indoors.

A doubleheader featuring both the U.S. Olympic and national squads was held at the Kingdome on February 3, 1979. The U.S. Olympic team defeated the Canadian Olympic team 2–0 in the first game, while the Soviet national team defeated the U.S. national team 3–1 in the second game; 13,317 spectators were present for both games.

The Kingdome was additionally considered in Seattle's bid to be a host city for the 1994 FIFA World Cup, but it was rejected in favor of Husky Stadium because of concerns over its indoor environment and its turf; the bid ultimately failed in part because of apprehension from the University of Washington.

== Other events ==
Upon its opening, the Kingdome served as one of the main convention centers in Seattle alongside the Seattle Center Coliseum. During preliminary studies for the then-proposed Washington State Convention Center (now the Seattle Convention Center) in the early 1980s, a proposal to build it on the stadium's northern parking lot was floated, but it was never seriously considered and ultimately rejected by the convention center board in favor of building it in the Downtown area.

The largest crowd to attend a single event in the Kingdome came early, during an eight-day Billy Graham crusade in 1976. The Friday night edition on May 14 drew 74,000 and featured singer Johnny Cash; 5,000 were turned away. The stadium was also part of Seattle's bid to host the 1988 Republican National Convention, but it ultimately failed because of a scheduling conflict with the Mariners.

Country singer CW McCall performed 8 shows during the 4-day Custom Van, Truck, 4-Wheel Drive and Motorcycle Show, March 17–20, 1977.

The Kingdome hosted a round of the AMA Supercross Championship from 1978 to 1999.

=== Concerts ===
Numerous rock concerts were held in the venue, despite significant echo and sound delay problems attributable to the structure's cavernous size.

Date	Artist	Opening act(s)	Tour / Concert name	Attendance	Revenue	Notes
June 10, 1976	Wings	–	Wings Over America Tour	67,053	$536,424	The concert set the national indoor attendance record for a single act. It also marked the first time Paul McCartney had toured America since The Beatles stopped touring in 1966. The performance was filmed and included in the concert movie Rockshow.
August 6, 1976	Eagles	Linda Ronstadt; JD Souther	–	48,843	$398,744	
September 3, 1976	Aerosmith	Jeff Beck; Rick Derringer	Rocks Tour	51,091	$422,698	
June 27, 1977	Peter Frampton	Foghat; J. Geils Band; Blondie Chaplin	-	39,549	–	
July 17, 1977	Led Zeppelin	–	North American Tour 1977	68,954	–	The performance is available on VOIO and ROIO.
October 14, 1981	The Rolling Stones	Greg Kihn Band; J. Geils Band	American Tour 1981	69,132	–	
October 15, 1981	The Rolling Stones	Greg Kihn Band; J. Geils Band	American Tour 1981	68,028	–	Before the concert, a 16-year-old girl from Renton fell backward from a concrete guard rail at the outside 200-level ramp and plunged fifty feet (15 m) onto a loading area; she died at Harborview Medical Center despite medics immediately rushing her there.
July 23, 1982	Bryan Adams; Joan Jett and the Blackhearts; Blue Öyster Cult; Loverboy; Foreigner	–	The Rock and Roll Grand Slam 1982	38,201 / 70,000	$635,352	
October 20, 1982	The Who	The Clash; T Bone Burnett	The Who Tour 1982	67,000	–	
May 22, 1983	The Beach Boys	–	–	37,807	$320,000	The concert followed a Mariners game.
July 15, 1987	Madonna	Level 42; Bhundu Boys; Hue and Cry	Who's That Girl World Tour	30,000	–	
December 8, 1987	Pink Floyd	–	A Momentary Lapse of Reason Tour	33,700 / 40,000	$710,382	
July 27, 1988	Van Halen; Scorpions	Metallica; Dokken; Kingdom Come	Monsters of Rock	37,000	–	While Scorpions was on stage, lead singer Klaus Meine was hit in the throat by a camera thrown out of the audience. He ranted for around five minutes about having respect for the bands, then did one more song with the band before they left the stage.
March 29, 1990	Paul McCartney	–	The Paul McCartney World Tour	50,000	–	
September 6, 1990	New Kids on The Block	Perfect Gentlemen; Rick Wes	The Magic Summer Tour	42,929 / 52,619	$1,015,300	
October 6, 1992	Guns N' Roses; Metallica	Motörhead	Guns N' Roses/Metallica Stadium Tour	37,226 / 40,000	$1,023,715	
December 15, 1994	The Rolling Stones	Spin Doctors	Voodoo Lounge Tour	49,303 / 49,303	$2,311,900	
November 28, 1997	The Rolling Stones	Third Eye Blind	Bridges to Babylon Tour	42,258 / 42,258	$2,411,261	
December 12, 1997	U2	Smash Mouth	PopMart Tour	30,260 / 35,000	$1,539,105	

== Final years ==
The loss of the Sounders and Sonics in the mid-1980s caused financial constraints as the Kingdome was left with 59 unfilled days in their annual schedule. By the 1990s, multi-purpose stadiums fell out of favor with the public, and the Kingdome's suitability as an NFL and MLB venue came into doubt as a result. Neither the Seahawks' nor the Mariners' respective ownership groups saw the shared stadium arrangement as economically feasible because the Kingdome was unable to meet the needs of both tenants; they also noted the lack of revenue-generating luxury suites prominent in newer stadiums. After several years of threats to relocate the Mariners because of poor attendance and revenue, then-owner Jeff Smulyan put the team up for sale on December 6, 1991; he subsequently received approval by MLB to sell the team to an ownership group led by Nintendo president Hiroshi Yamauchi on June 10, 1992. Almost immediately, the new ownership group began campaigning with local and state governments to secure public funding for a new baseball-only stadium. In March 1994, King County Executive Gary Locke appointed a task force to study the need for a baseball-only stadium.

=== 1994 ceiling collapse ===
The Kingdome's roof had been problematic from the beginning because of a design flaw. With the stadium's limited budget compared to its contemporaries, its architects had the roof's acoustic ceiling tiles serve a dual purpose as forms to pour concrete over for the roof sections. They were firmly placed via six metal clips on their edges, but the effectiveness of the clips was weakened as moisture from the polyurethane insulation accumulated in the tiles because it lacked proper water vapor management. As a result, leaks were discovered in the roof three months before the stadium opened, and several attempts at repairs made the situation worse or were quickly undone.

In 1993, the county decided to strip off the outer roof coating and replace it with a special coating. Sandblasting failed to strip the old roof material off, and the contractor changed its method to pressure washing. This pressure-washing resulted in water seepage through the roof, and on July 19, 1994, four 26-pound (12 kg), waterlogged acoustic ceiling tiles fell into the seating area. The tiles fell while the Mariners were on the field preparing for a scheduled game against the Baltimore Orioles, a half-hour before the gates were to open for fans to enter the stadium. As a result, the Kingdome was closed for repairs.

The Mariners were forced to play the last 20 games of the 1994 season on the road after the players' union vetoed playing the "home" games at Cheney Stadium in Tacoma, BC Place Stadium in Vancouver, British Columbia, or a neutral site because the union believed that its members should play only in major-league venues. The extended road trip could have lasted over two months, but it was shortened because of the 1994–95 Major League Baseball strike, which began on August 12 and ended up canceling the remainder of the 1994 MLB season; the strike also resulted in a delay to the start of the 1995 season. The Seahawks had to play both their two preseason home games and their first three regular-season home games of the 1994 season at nearby Husky Stadium.

The Kingdome held a reopening ceremony the weekend of November 4–6, 1994, which culminated with the Seahawks returning to the stadium for a regular-season game against the Cincinnati Bengals. Repairing the roof ultimately cost US$51 million, and two construction workers lost their lives in a crane accident on August 17 during the repair. The incident also motivated plans to replace the stadium.

=== Replacement ===
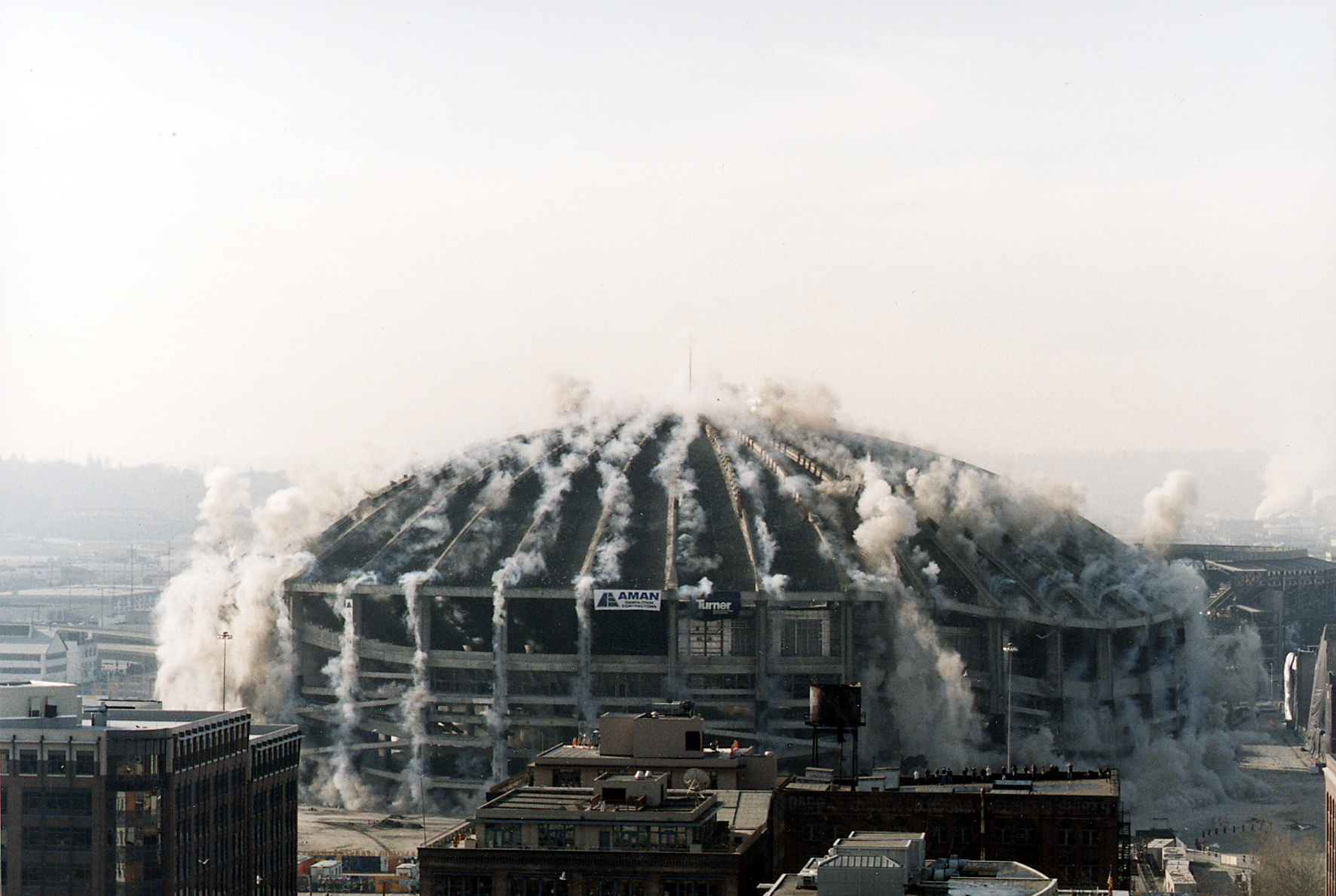
The Kingdome imploding in March 2000

On September 19, 1995, King County voters defeated a ballot measure that would have funded the construction of a new baseball-only stadium for the Mariners. However, the following month, the Mariners made it to the MLB postseason for the first time and, on October 8, defeated the New York Yankees in the decisive fifth game of the 1995 ALDS on the heels of a walk-off game-winning double hit by Edgar Martínez. The Mariners' postseason run demonstrated that there was a fan base in Seattle that wanted the team to stay in town, and as a result, the Washington State Legislature approved a separate funding package for a new stadium on October 14.

In January 1996, Seahawks owner Ken Behring announced he was moving the team to Los Angeles and the team would play at Anaheim Stadium, which had recently been vacated as a football venue when the Los Angeles Rams moved to St. Louis (at the same time, the Los Angeles Raiders returned to Oakland, after 13 years away). His rationale for the decision included unfounded safety concerns surrounding the seismic stability of the Kingdome. Behring went so far as to relocate team headquarters to Anaheim, California, but his plans were defeated when lawyers found out that the Seahawks could not break their lease on the Kingdome until 2005. As a result, Behring tried to sell the team. He found a potential buyer in Microsoft co-founder Paul Allen, who stipulated that a new publicly funded stadium had to be built as a condition of his purchase of the team. Allen funded a special election held on June 17, 1997, that featured a measure that would allocate public funding for a new stadium for the Seahawks on the Kingdome site. The measure passed, Allen officially purchased the team, and the Kingdome's fate was sealed.

Despite the intention of the Mariners to start playing at their new home at the beginning of the 1999 season, construction delays meant that installation of its retractable roof would not occur on time, leading to another sale threat by the team's owners. However, the team eventually agreed to play at the Kingdome from the start of the season until after the All-Star Game, with construction on the new home starting on March 8, 1997. Two years later, a sold-out crowd of 56,530 watched as the Mariners defeated the Texas Rangers 5–2 in their final game at the Kingdome on June 27, 1999; they played their first game at their new home, Safeco Field, nearly three weeks later on July 15.

Meanwhile, the Seahawks temporarily relocated to Husky Stadium for two seasons following the 1999 season. To make way for construction of their new stadium, the Kingdome was stripped down and prepared for demolition. During the process, a security incident occurred on February 21, 2000, when a skateboarder disguised himself as a construction worker, climbed up onto the roof, and skated on it with two friends filming him on the nearby Alaskan Way Viaduct; demolition crews were unimpressed by the incident and implemented tighter security measures in response. On the morning of March 26, 2000 at 8:30 AM, the Kingdome was demolished by Controlled Demolition, Inc. via implosion, just one day short of 24 years after the stadium's opening. It set a record recognized by Guinness World Records for the largest building, by volume, ever demolished by implosion, a record that stands today. The Kingdome was the first large, domed stadium to be demolished in the United States; its demolition was also the first live event covered by ESPN Classic. The new stadium, Seahawks Stadium, eventually opened on July 20, 2002, in time for the beginning of the NFL season that year.

The Kingdome was demolished before the debt issued to finance its construction was fully paid, and as of September 2010, residents of King County were still responsible for more than $80 million in debt on the demolished stadium. The debt was retired in March 2015, nine months ahead of the original bond maturity and 15 years after the stadium's demolition. The 2% of the 15.6% hotel/motel tax earmarked for the Kingdome debt no longer needed went instead to the county's 4Culture program for arts, heritage, and preservation.

== Seating capacity ==
Baseball
Years	Capacity
1976–1980	59,059
1981–1987	59,438
1988–1990	58,850
1991–1993	57,748
1994–1999	59,166

Football
Years	Capacity
1976–1979	64,752
1980–1983	64,759
1984–1992	64,984
1993–2000	66,400

Basketball
Capacity
40,192

== In popular culture ==
Because of its versatility and its prominent position in the Seattle skyline for close to a quarter-century, the Kingdome was featured in numerous forms of media during and after its existence. On television, it served as the backdrop for a rescue in the 1978 TV movie "Most Deadly Passage" of NBC's Emergency! series, which featured the work of Seattle Medic One paramedics. It was also mentioned in 1992 with the airing of "Crushed", the sixteenth episode of the fifth season of ABC sitcom Full House; in the episode, guest star Tommy Page boasted to Jesse Katsopolis about playing there. The Kingdome was mentioned again in 1998 during the sixth season of NBC sitcom Frasier, which was set in Seattle. In the sixth episode, "Secret Admirer", Martin describes Daphne's frustrating driving that repeatedly takes them right into various traffic delays, ending with them encountering traffic from the Kingdome. Furthermore, the Kingdome's demolition was featured on The History Channel's Modern Marvels series with their "Concrete" episode that first aired on May 31, 2000.

The Kingdome was not limited to just television mentions; numerous songs mentioned it in their lyrics. While playing with the Mariners, Lenny Randle recorded a song titled "Kingdome" with some of his teammates and family members in order to raise money to buy a speech synthesizer for a young fan with cerebral palsy. Rock band Foo Fighters mentioned the stadium in the refrain of "New Way Home", which was featured on their 1997 album, The Colour and the Shape. Rapper Macklemore also mentioned the Kingdome in "My Oh My", a 2011 song that paid tribute to Dave Niehaus, the longtime play-by-play announcer of the Mariners who had recently died; in it, he talks about growing up in Seattle and going to the Kingdome. The song mentions the Double in the Mariners–Yankees 1995 ALDS, and its accompanying music video also contains footage of the Kingdome's demolition.

With the rise of 3D computer graphics, video games started to depict the Kingdome as well. The stadium is visible on and directly next to part of the Seattle track in the 1998 video game Rush 2: Extreme Racing USA. The Gran Turismo series of racing games on the PlayStation line of consoles featured the Kingdome in the Seattle Circuit race track, a street circuit based on the roads of Seattle. Seattle Circuit is featured in Gran Turismo 2, Gran Turismo 3: A-Spec, Gran Turismo 4, Tourist Trophy, and Gran Turismo PSP. Despite the Kingdome's demolition occurring before the game was released, Gran Turismo 3: A-Spec still featured it in the track. The Kingdome also made an appearance in the 2007 RTS game World in Conflict, in which it was destroyed by Soviet artillery during a Soviet invasion of Seattle in an alternate timeline.

== See also ==
- Delta Dome
- Thin-shell structure
- List of thin shell structures

== Notes ==
Events and tenants
Preceded by first stadium	Home of the Seattle Seahawks; 1976 – 1999	Succeeded by Husky Stadium
Preceded by first ballpark	Home of the Seattle Mariners; 1977 – 1999	Succeeded by T-Mobile Park
Preceded by Seattle Center Coliseum	Home of the Seattle SuperSonics; 1978 – 1985	Succeeded by Seattle Center Coliseum
Preceded by The Pit; Kemper Arena; Charlotte Coliseum	NCAA Men's Division I Basketball tournament Finals Venue; 1984; 1989; 1995	Succeeded by Rupp Arena; McNichols Sports Arena; Continental Airlines Arena
Preceded by Louisiana Superdome	Host of the NFL Pro Bowl; 1977	Succeeded by Tampa Stadium
Preceded by San Diego Stadium	Host of the MLB All-Star Game; 1979	Succeeded by Dodger Stadium
Preceded by Reunion Arena	Host of the NBA All-Star Game; 1987	Succeeded by Chicago Stadium
Preceded by Lockhart Stadium	Host of the College Cup; 1984–1985	Succeeded by Tacoma Dome
