= Seattle Social Housing Developer =

Seattle government agency

Agency overview
- Formed: March 2, 2023
- Jurisdiction: Seattle
- Headquarters: 419 Occidental Ave S, Seattle, Washington
- Employees: 7
- Agency executives: Tiffani McCoy, Interim CEO; ChrisTiana ObeySumner, Board Chair
- Website: seattlesocialhousing.org

The Seattle Social Housing Developer (SSHD) is a public development authority created to own and operate social housing in Seattle.

== History ==
The Seattle Social Housing Developer (SSHD) was created by ballot initiative 135 (I-135) in 2023. The I-135 campaign was organized by House Our Neighbors, a coalition including Real Change and the Seattle Democratic Socialists of America. House Our Neighbors chose not to include a funding mechanism in I-135 out of concern that creating a new public development authority and a new tax to fund it would violate Washington's single-subject rule. It passed in a special election on February 14, 2023 with 57% of the vote. On March 2, Mayor Bruce Harrell signed the initiative into law. The first board meeting was held on May 24. Although it was allocated $180,000 in startup funding by the state legislature, the State Department of Commerce did not issue the SSHD the first installment of that funding until March 2024.

In 2024, House Our Neighbors launched ballot initiative 137 to fund the SSHD with a tax on companies with employees earning more than $1,000,000 a year. It passed with more than 63 percent of the vote in a special election on February 11, 2025. Although originally estimated to generate $50 million each year, the tax yielded $133 million in 2026. Interim CEO Tiffani McCoy announced that the agency planned to purchase 2 properties containing a total of 300 units in 2026 before transitioning to new construction.

== Governance ==
The Seattle Social Housing Developer is governed by a 13-member board. 7 members are appointed by the Seattle Renters' Commission, two by the City Council, and one each by the Mayor, King County Labor Council, Green New Deal Oversight Board, and a community organization providing housing to marginalized communities. Board members serve staggered four-year terms. Once SSHD has begun to operate housing, the 7 seats appointed by the Seattle Renters' Commission will be filled by residents of the SSHD's buildings.

Roberto Jiménez was hired to be the SSHD's first CEO in August 2024. In December 2025, a number of community organizations authored a letter criticizing Jiménez's absence from meetings, failure to make progress on hiring staff, and decision not to relocate to Seattle as he had originally promised. On January 14, Seattle Democratic Socialists of America called Jiménez "incapable of achieving even ordinary tasks" and called for his replacement. The following day, the Board fired Jiménez and named Tiffani McCoy as his interim replacement.

== See also ==
- Public housing in Singapore
- Gemeindebau

== Bibliography ==
- Patrick, Anna (August 14, 2023b). "Seattle social housing developer sees first round of funding". Seattle Times.
- Kroman, David (January 16, 2026). "CEO of Seattle's social housing developer fired by board". Seattle Times.
- "Meet Our Team". Seattle Social Housing Developer. 2026.
- Cohen, Josh (May 26, 2022). "Seattle's social housing campaign, explained". Cascade PBS.
- "February 14, 2023 Special Election". King County.
- "February 11, 2025 Special Election". King County.
- Patrick, Anna (March 2, 2023a). "New 'social housing' developer becomes official, but when will it be funded?". Seattle Times.
- McNichols, Joshua; Denkmann, Libby; Gasca, Noel (May 25, 2023). "'Real people being represented': Seattle's social housing board is just getting started".
- Kroman, David (April 4, 2024). "Seattle's social housing developer struggles to take shape". Seattle Times.
- Hamann, Emily (August 1, 2024). "CEO Roberto Jiménez leaving Mutual Housing California for social housing developer in Seattle". Sacramento Business Journal.
- McNichols, Joshua (January 23, 2025). "Why someone earning over $100,000 could qualify for Seattle's affordable housing". KUOW.
- Schneider, Benjamin (April 14, 2026). "Social housing coming to Seattle this year". Remapping Debate.
- Trumm, Doug (January 16, 2026). "Seattle Social Housing Board Fires CEO, Taps McCoy as Interim Leader". The Urbanist.
- Bollag, Jordan (March 2, 2025). "Seattle Has Voted to Build Social Housing". Jacobin.
- "Seattle Social Housing Public Development Authority". Granicus. May 14, 2026.
