= Ann Streissguth =

American scientist (1932–2023)

- Born: December 13, 1932; Pasadena, California, U.S.
- Died: August 1, 2023 (aged 90)
- Occupation: Director of the Fetal Alcohol Drug Unit
- Awards: American Psychological Foundation Gold Medal for Lifetime Achievement for Psychology in the Public Interest

Academic background
- Education: 1954 B.S., Oregon State University 1959 M.S., University of California, Berkeley 1964 Ph.D., University of Washington

Ann Roth Pytkowicz Streissguth (December 13, 1932 – August 1, 2023) was an American scientist known for her research on fetal alcohol spectrum disorder. She is an Endowed Professor Emeritus and Founding Director of the Fetal Alcohol Drug Unit at the University of Washington School of Medicine.

Streissguth the author of Fetal Alcohol Syndrome: A Guide for Families and Communities, The Challenge of Fetal Alcohol Syndrome: Overcoming Secondary Disabilities, and In Love with a Hillside Garden.

== Awards ==
Streissguth received the American Psychological Foundation's Gold Medal for Lifetime Achievement for Psychology in the Public Interest in 2002, and an Excellence Award from the National Organization on Fetal Alcohol Syndrome in 2003. In 2005, Streissguth received an Honorary Doctorate Award in the Humanities from her undergraduate alma mater, Oregon State University.

== Biography ==
Streissguth was born in South Pasadena, California to Agnes Gurney Roth and Arie Roth. In 1950, she graduated from Roseburg High School in Oregon. She graduated magna cum laude with a B.S. degree at Oregon State University in 1954, and her M.S. degree at the University of California, Berkeley in 1959. In 1964 Streissguth received her Ph.D. from the University of Washington. Throughout her career, Streissguth participated in academic work at the University of Washington. She was hired as Assistant Professor for the Department of Psychiatry and Behavioral Sciences in 1968. She was associate professor from 1974-1979 until her promotion to Professor in 1979. She was named Professor Emeritus in 2005.

Streissguth was a member of the National Organization on Fetal Alcohol Syndrome. She is known for her research program on fetal alcohol syndrome, and its effects on child development. With her colleagues Kenneth Jones, David Smith and Christy Ulleland, Streissguth conducted research on eight children who were born to alcoholic mothers which resulted in the first widely circulated paper on fetal alcohol syndrome and its relation to alcohol abuse during pregnancy. Streissguth has published findings on the long-term consequences of alcohol use during pregnancy.

Ann Streissguth married Daniel Michener Streissguth in 1968, and together they had one child. Together they created Streissguth Gardens a family-maintained hillside garden covering approximately one acre on the northwest side of Capitol Hill in Seattle, Washington. Dan Streissguth died in November 2020, at the age of 96. Ann Streissguth died on August 1, 2023, at the age of 90.
