= Howe Street Stairs =

Outdoor stairway in Seattle, Washington, U.S.

- Public stairway
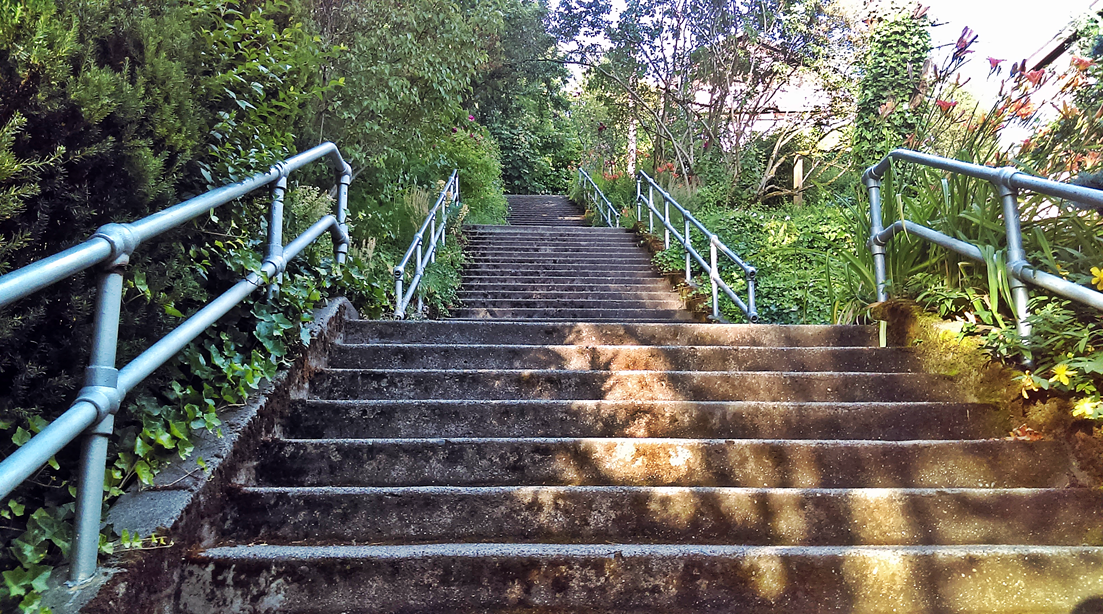
- Three flights of the Howe Street Stairs pictured in June 2016
- Opened: 1911
- Steps: 388
- Location: Seattle, United States
- Interactive map of Howe Street Stairs
- Coordinates: 47.6360°N 122.3206°W

The Howe Street Stairs (also known as the East Howe Steps, Howe Stairs, Howe Street Staircase, and the Howe Staircase) are a public, outdoor staircase that straddles Seattle's Capitol Hill and Eastlake neighborhoods. They were constructed in 1911.

== History ==
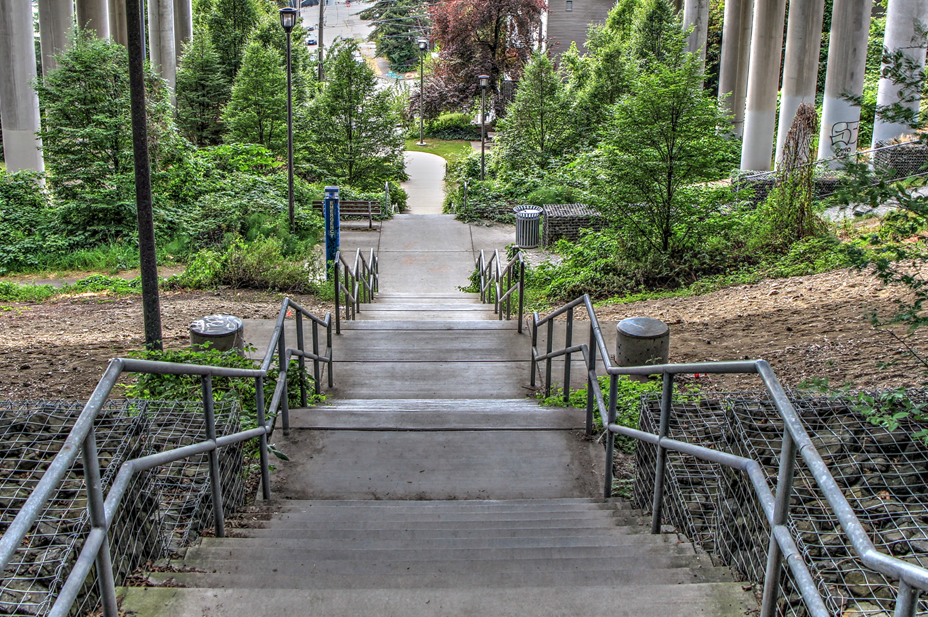
The Howe Street Stairs as they pass under the I-5 Colonnade, pictured in 2016

Due to Seattle's difficult topography, the city has spent more than a century building in excess of 650 staircases linking sections of neighborhoods that are otherwise isolated or disconnected. The Howe Street Stairs were originally built in 1911 to provide a pedestrian link between two different lines in Seattle's former streetcar system.

A proposal to construct a plaza at the bottom of the staircase has been advanced by area residents since the 2000s.

== Design ==
The stairs, which begin at Eastlake Avenue, are divided into 13 flights interrupted by landings and streets. They contain 388 steps and are the longest such staircase in the city. A portion of the stairs pass through the I-5 Colonnade, a city park under an elevated section of Interstate 5. They terminate at Howe Street, from which they take their name.

The stairs sit parallel to the nearby Blaine Street Stairs, which transits an identical route. They are used for exercise and fitness, as well as commuting.

== See also ==
- Regrading in Seattle
- Public stairways in Seattle
- Transportation in Seattle
