= Historic Seattle =

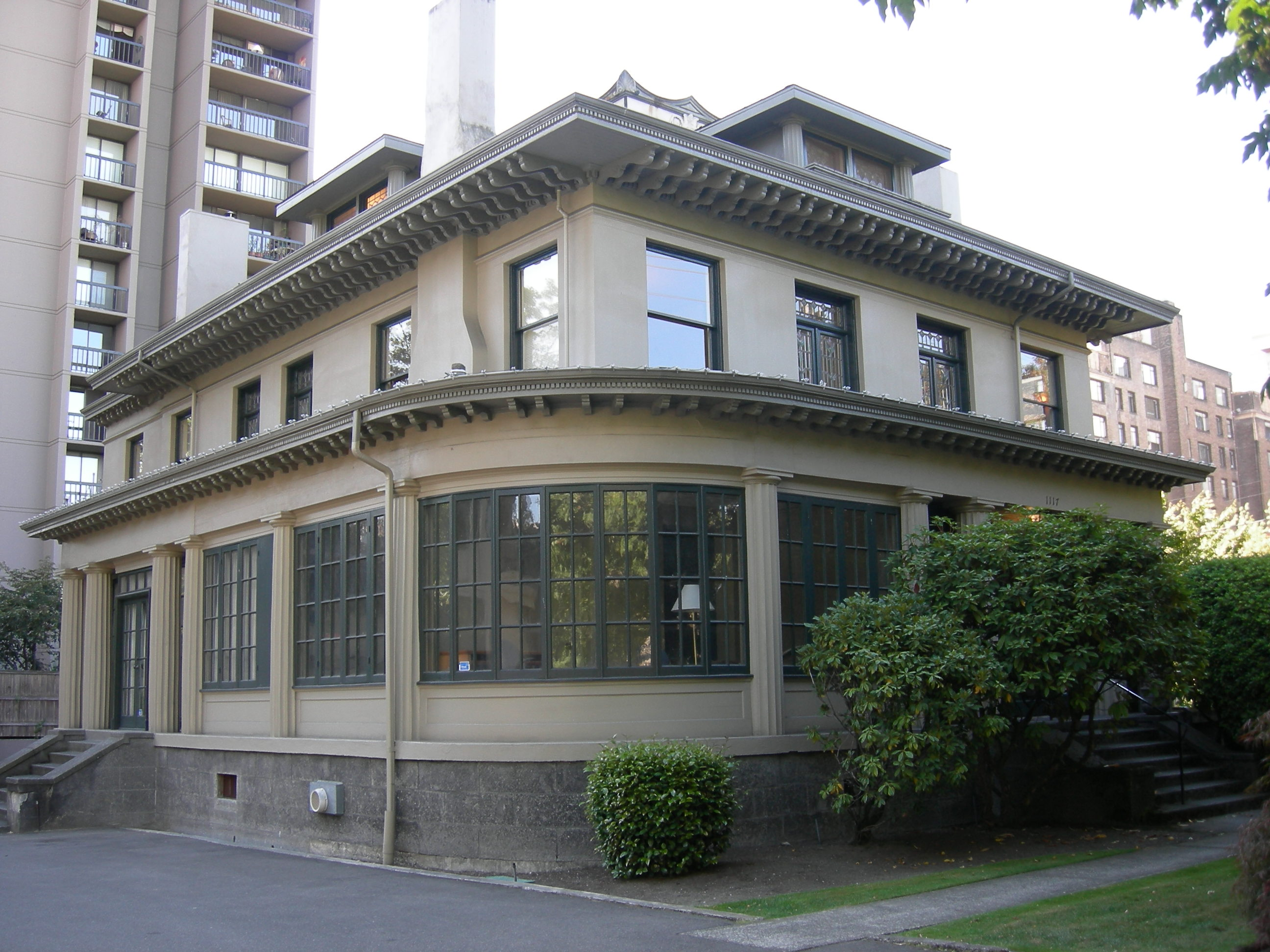
Historic Seattle's headquarters, the Henry H. Dearborn House (photographed 2007), is on the National Register of Historic Places.

Historic Seattle is a Seattle, Washington public development authority focused on preserving Seattle's architectural heritage. For many years, they issued a monthly online magazine, Preservation Seattle and are involved in advocacy and education.

As a public development authority, Historic Seattle is a government-owned corporation. Its 12-member board includes 4 members appointed by the Mayor of Seattle, 4 appointed by the PDA Council, and 4 elected by its constituency. All board members serve 4-year terms. Its mission is the "Preservation and enhancement of the historic heritage of Seattle for the mutual pride and enjoyment of all citizens, and creation of a more livable environment within the historic areas of the city."

According to their website, as of 2006 they had completed 44 projects "in capacities ranging from owner/developer to consultant." Among these were their own headquarters, Dearborn House. Other prominent Seattle buildings with which they are or have been involved include the Good Shepherd Center in Seattle's Wallingford neighborhood, a former Catholic girls' home, which Historic Seattle owns and operates mainly as office space for non profit organizations; the Cadillac Hotel in Pioneer Square, now the visitor center of the Klondike Gold Rush National Historical Park; and Town Hall, a former Christian Science church that now functions as a 900-seat venue for lectures and performances; They have also been involved in one or another capacity with numerous houses including the Carpenter Gothic Twenty-third Avenue Houses, originally built in 1892-1893 as inexpensive housing; the Fourteenth Avenue Houses, a remnant of a late 19th-century community of mostly Finnish immigrants at Smith Cove; and Egan House with which Historic Seattle has ever been involved.
