= Bacon Bowl =

Charity football game in Seattle (1979–2005)

The Bacon Bowl was an annual charity football game in the United States. It was originally played between members of the Seattle Police Department on one side, and members of the Tacoma Police Department, Pierce County sheriff's deputies, and state police working in Pierce County on the other side. Over the years, participation grew to include personnel from other law enforcement bodies in the counties.

It was the second largest charity football game played in the US. All money raised, after expenses, went to various children's charities around the Puget Sound region. Through 2001, $2.4 million had been distributed to charities.

The Bacon Bowl was played from 1979 through 2005. By 2004, there was criticism that too much of the money raised had gone to a telemarketing firm and expenses. In 2002, although the game raised nearly $350,000, after expenses only $18,380 went to charities. Other problems were a decrease in attendance, injury concerns and the difficulty in finding players to play the game. The game was replaced in 2006 in favor of other athletic events, including a 3.1-mile (5-kilometre) run and walk. A later replacement for the football game in 2007 was a boxing event.

Over 3,000 law enforcement officials in both police departments participated in the game during its 26-year run.

Its name derives from the eponymous pork product, a play on "pig," a pejorative term for police officers in the United States.

== Venues ==
- Kingdome
- Husky Stadium
- Qwest Field
- Tacoma Dome
- Memorial Stadium

At the conclusion of the 27-game series, standings were:

- Tacoma PD: 15 wins
- Seattle PD: 12 wins

== See also ==
- Tacoma Police Department
- Seattle Police Department
