= Henry H. Dearborn House =

Historic house in Washington, United States

- U.S. National Register of Historic Places
- Seattle Landmark
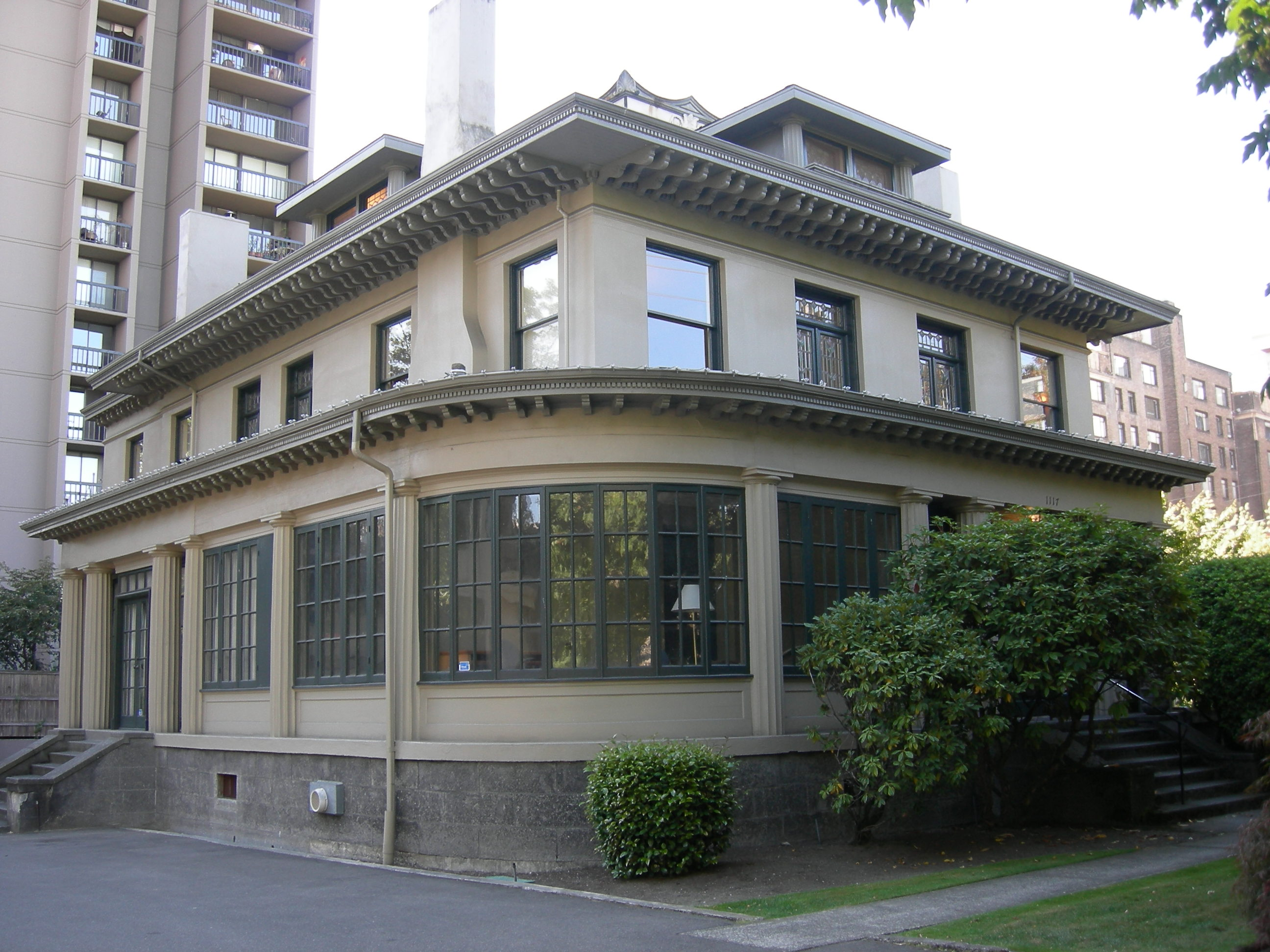
- Henry H. Dearborn House while being used as headquarters of Historic Seattle.

- Location within Washington (state) Location within the United States
- Location: 1117 Minor Ave., Seattle, Washington, USA
- Coordinates: 47.610911°N 122.325587°W
- Built: 1907
- Architect: Henry Dozier
- Architectural style: American Foursquare
- NRHP reference No.: 97001672
- Added to NRHP: Jan 23, 1998

The Henry H. Dearborn House, also known as the Seattle Dearborn House, is a single family residence in the First Hill neighborhood of Seattle, Washington, United States. It was designed in 1904 by architect Henry Dozier, and building was completed in 1907 for Seattle real estate developer Henry H. Dearborn. It is listed on the National Register of Historic Places and as a Seattle Landmark by the Seattle Landmarks Preservation Board. As of 2021, the building is used as the headquarters of Historic Seattle.

The Dearborn house is two and a half stories in an American Foursquare style, with stucco exterior. The house has an enclosed veranda and an out building originally built as stables. In 1953 the house was converted to a medical office, and subsequently into office space.
