= Streissguth Gardens =

Gardens in Seattle, Washington

Coordinates: 47°38′05″N 122°19′15″W

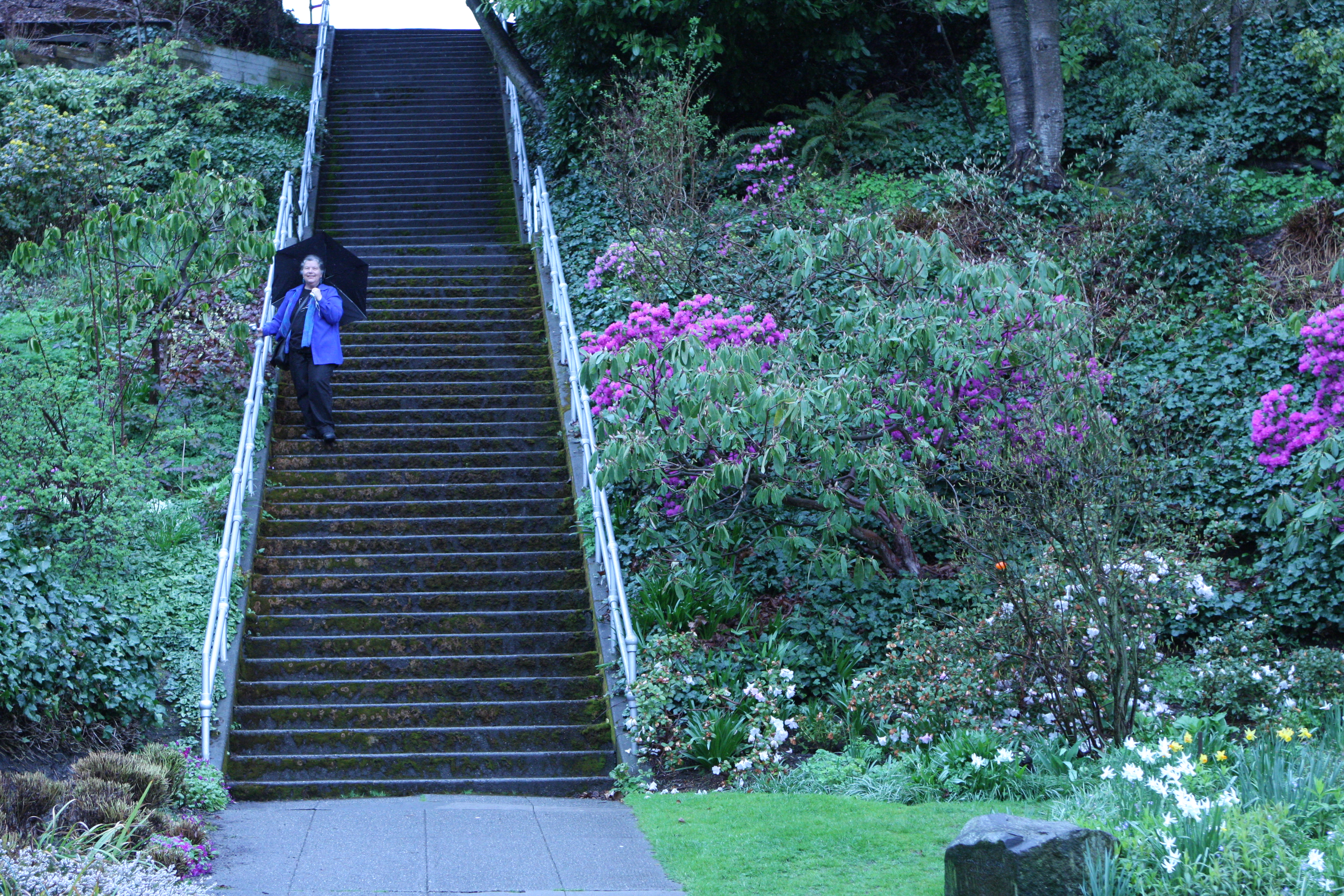
- Interactive map of Streissguth Gardens
- Nearest city: Seattle, Washington

The Streissguth Gardens are a family-maintained hillside garden covering approximately one acre on the northwest side of Capitol Hill in Seattle, Washington.

== Early history ==
The Streissguth Gardens have grown incrementally over the years, beginning with Daniel Streissguth’s purchase of the north lot by the Blaine steps in 1962. In 1965, Ann Roth Pytkowicz moved into the adjacent house at 1806 Broadway East and began cultivating a garden there. The two gardens were joined when Daniel and Ann married in 1968, and the combined gardens form the basis for the larger family garden that exists today.

== Expansion ==
In 1972, two years after Ben was born, the family purchased the hillside lots south of the Blaine steps. The first path was cleared in order to admire a native trillium discovered blooming among the weeds in the middle of the hillside. Further paths were developed to allow better access for planting and maintenance as more of the hillside was cultivated, and Ben and his friends, as well as other neighbors, began enjoying the growing network of trails. The oldest trail was named the Woodland Path, followed by the High Path, the Rock Wall Path, and the Raccoon Pool Path. Over time, the tree canopy has been thinned to allow for better views of Lake Union from the various paths and higher points in the garden.

== Special sections ==
From north to south, the gardens are divided into four main sections, beginning with the perennial/shrub section that borders the public steps and walkway on East Blaine Street. Second is the central section, extending from the hillside trails to the east to the edge of Broadway East, to the west. This main section includes perennials and fruit-bearing shrub plantings, as well as berries and vegetable beds. Third, the Rust Garden, which has the best soil and sunlight, has been cultivated for perennials. Finally, the transition zone between the developed gardens and the St. Mark's Greenbelt is experiencing a blurring of boundaries to facilitate better public access and enjoyment of the gardens.

== The public gardens ==
The garden was first threatened with encroaching construction in the late 1970s, when the wooded lots at the south end of Broadway East were proved viable for a condo development project. The neighborhood rallied together and succeeded in protecting the lots. When in 1989 the city of Seattle passed a bond to purchase and preserve undeveloped green space, the neighborhood nominated the garden’s south lots for purchase. After negotiations with the city, this was finally achieved in 1996 and the south lots of the Streissguth Gardens became public land, and part of the St. Mark's Greenbelt.

== Programs ==
In 2006, the Streissguth family began a volunteer program for the garden. In 2008, dedicated volunteer workers contributed a total of 157 hours toward beautification and maintenance.
