= 4Culture =

Public development authority in King County, Washington

Agency overview
- Formed: 1965
- Jurisdiction: King County, Washington state
- Headquarters: 101 Prefontaine Place South Seattle WA 98104
- Annual budget: US$8,213,436 (2012)
- Agency executive: Brian Carter, Executive Director

4Culture is a tax-exempt public development authority (PDA), with a fifteen-member board of directors, who are nominated by the King County Executive and confirmed by the King County Council. A Public Development Authority is a public entity created by cities or counties to accomplish public purpose activities without assuming them into the regular functions of County government.

== Background ==
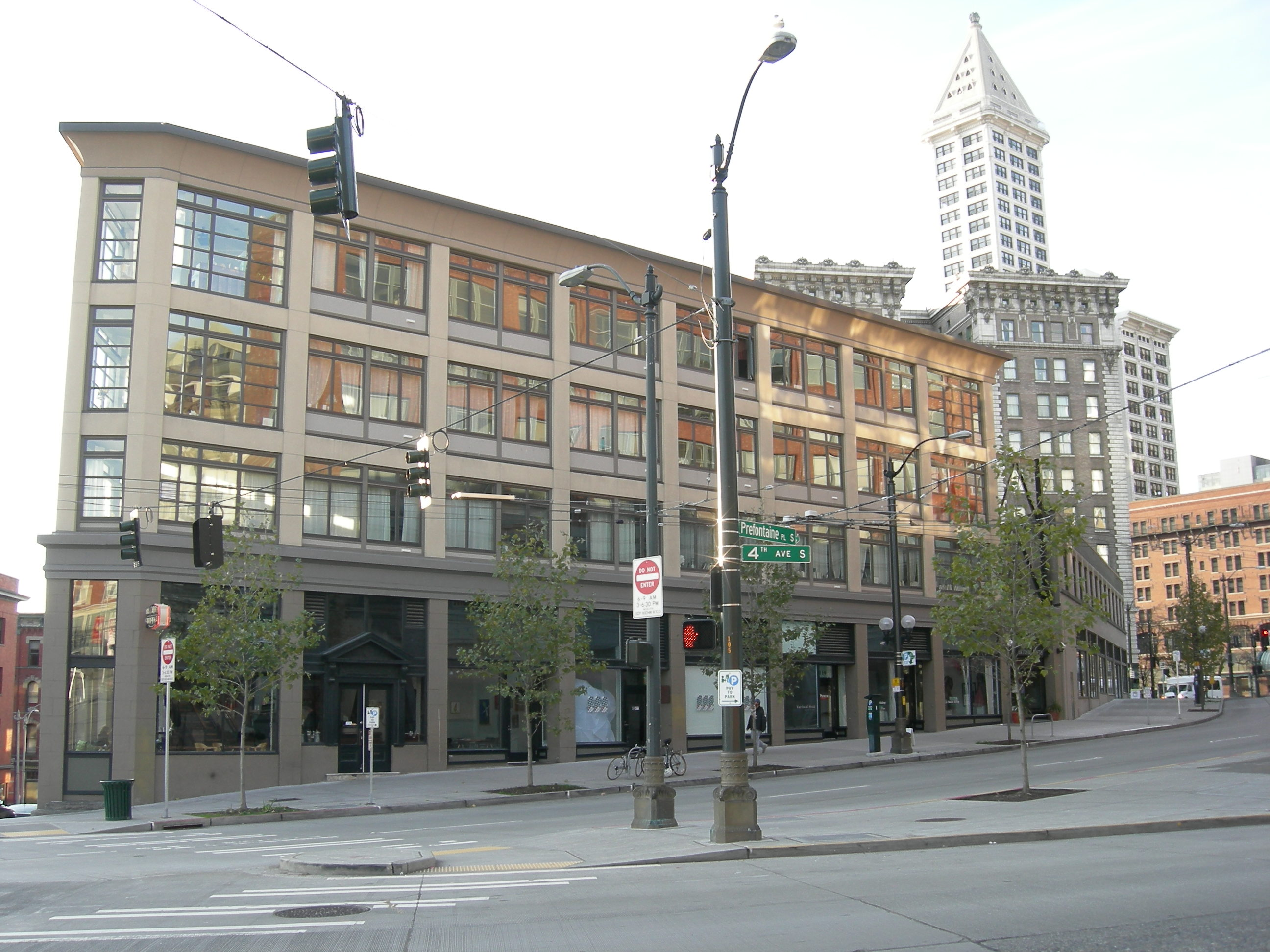
4Culture's offices are located in Seattle's historic Tashiro Kaplan building

4Culture evolved from the Office of Cultural Resources, a department of King County government, which housed King County's arts, heritage, preservation and public art office. In 2001, in reaction to the post-9/11 economic recession and subsequent elimination of its Current Expense (CX) funding, the Office of Cultural Resources staff proposed to the King County Executive and Council that they transition the office to a public development authority (PDA). This structure would allow dedicated public funds to be stretched further through business innovations and allow access to other revenues, including grants and earned income through consulting services, that are traditionally beyond the reach of a government agency. The County Executive agreed and the County Council adopted an ordinance approving the establishment of the Cultural Development Authority of King County in September 2002, effective January 1, 2003.

== Governance ==
The work of 4Culture is accomplished by over 150 individuals each year. 4Culture is governed by a fifteen-member board of directors, who are nominated by the King County Executive and confirmed by the King County Council, and aim to "[represent] the cultural, geographic, and ethnic diversity of King County." Additionally, over 20 citizen volunteers in the fields of arts, heritage, preservation and public art serve on 4Culture Advisory Committees that contribute to program and policy development. Every year, over 100 citizen panelists review applications to competitive funding programs and calls for artists.

== Programs and grants ==
Through the integration of five program areas—arts, heritage, preservation, science and public art—4Culture works to: identify the needs of local King County communities and create programs that meet these needs; champion individual expression and community engagement; create and support a distinctive built environment; and work with artists and cultural organizations to offer culturally relevant solutions for the region.
