= FASD United =

U.S. nonprofit organization

- Formation: 1990
- Type: Non-profit public health charitable organization
- Purpose: The issue of fetal alcohol syndrome and fetal alcohol spectrum disorders

FASD United is a non-profit public health charitable organization focused on fetal alcohol spectrum disorders (FASD). FASD United was founded in 1990 as the National Organization on Fetal Alcohol Syndrome (NOFAS) to advocate for improved public policy for people living with FASD, provide resources and support, and educate the public about FASD and the risks of drinking alcohol while pregnant. The organization has a network of 48 affiliates around the United States.

FASD United works in collaboration with several U.S. government agencies, such as the Centers for Disease Control and Prevention. In 2022, the CDC awarded a four-year cooperative agreement with the organization to increase FASD support services.

Susan Shepard Carlson is the chair of the board, and Tom Donaldson is the president and CEO of the organization.

Programs include:

- Information clearinghouse of FASD facts and research
- Support group for families with FASD
- Peer mentoring group of birth mothers to children with FASD (Circle of Hope Birth Mothers Network)
- Medical student curriculum
- Public awareness campaigns, social media outreach
- Trainings on FASD for doctors and public health professionals
- Legislative/public policy advocacy
