= St. Mark's Greenbelt =

Greenbelt in Seattle, Washington, United States

Coordinates: 47°37′52″N 122°19′19″W

- Interactive map of St. Mark's Greenbelt
- Location: Seattle, Washington, United States

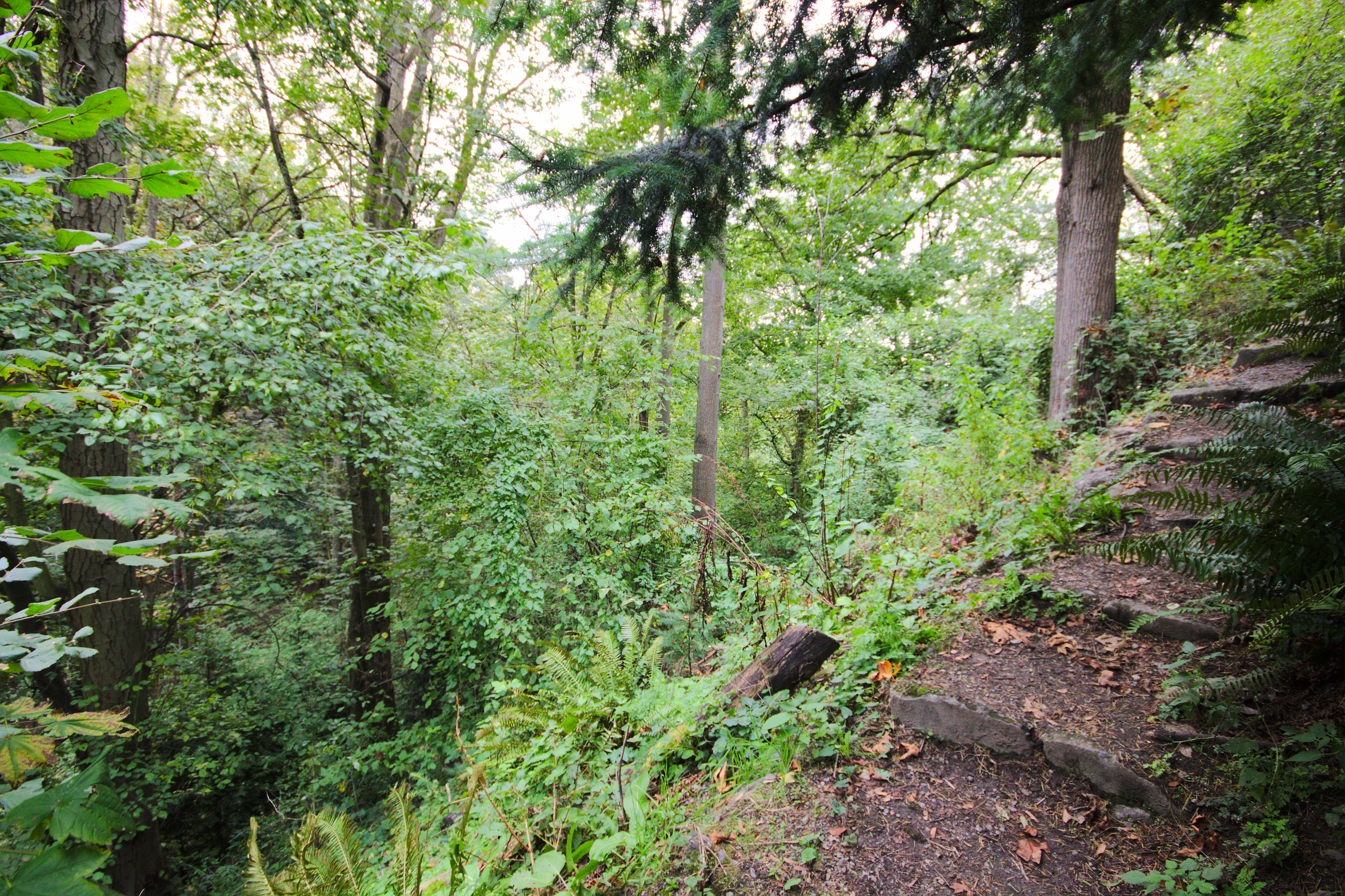
Walking trail in St. Mark's Greenbelt

The St. Marks Green Belt, in Seattle, Washington, borders East Blaine Street to the west, 10th Ave East to the east. The northern and southern borders are vague at best mixed with trees and houses. The greenbelt helps buffer the noise from I-5 from Capitol Hill. A trail entrance at the Lefler House parking lot leads through the green belt looping back to the other end of the parking lot. A small creek runs through the center of the western portion of the greenbelt weaving through corrugated pipes above and underground.

== History ==
In 1993, the city added the greenbelt to a number of properties protected by the green space policy. Later in the 1990s, the Streissguth family donated additional land to the greenbelt that included a permanent garden. In 2007 a large grant from the city was given to Green Seattle and St. Marks Episcopal Cathedral to reduce invasive plant species and build new trails.

== Plants and Animals ==
The greenbelt has been overrun in the last decade with invasive species of plants; mainly Holly and Ivy. A lack of native species especially conifers leaves little for the urban wildlife except local birds. One positive of the location is that provides refuge for raptors hunting on I-5 and is a good place to view American Kestrels and occasional a Peregrine Falcon.
