= Public development authority =

In the U.S. state of Washington, a public development authority (most commonly PDA; also known as a public corporation) is a government-owned corporation. They are established under RCW 35.21.730.

For example, the city of Seattle has numerous PDAs: the Burke Gilman Place PDA, Community Roots Housing, Historic Seattle PDA, Museum Development Authority, Pacific Hospital PDA, Pike Place Market PDA, Seattle Chinatown/International District PDA, 4Culture, and the Seattle Indian Services Commission. Examples from elsewhere in the state include a PDA that oversees the Meydenbauer Center, a performing arts venue in Bellevue, Washington and the Hurricane Ridge Public Development Authority, created by the city of Port Angeles, Washington to develop and oversee the Hurricane Ridge Ski and Snowboard Area.

A PDA is legally separate from the city or county that establishes it. Under state and federal law, all PDA contracts must specify that liabilities incurred by the corporation must be satisfied exclusively from their own assets. According to the City of Seattle, "This allows accomplishment of public purpose activities without assuming them into the regular functions of City government." Each Seattle PDA is governed by a volunteer council that oversees PDA activities and staff.
