= Right of way =

Legal authority to use a specific route

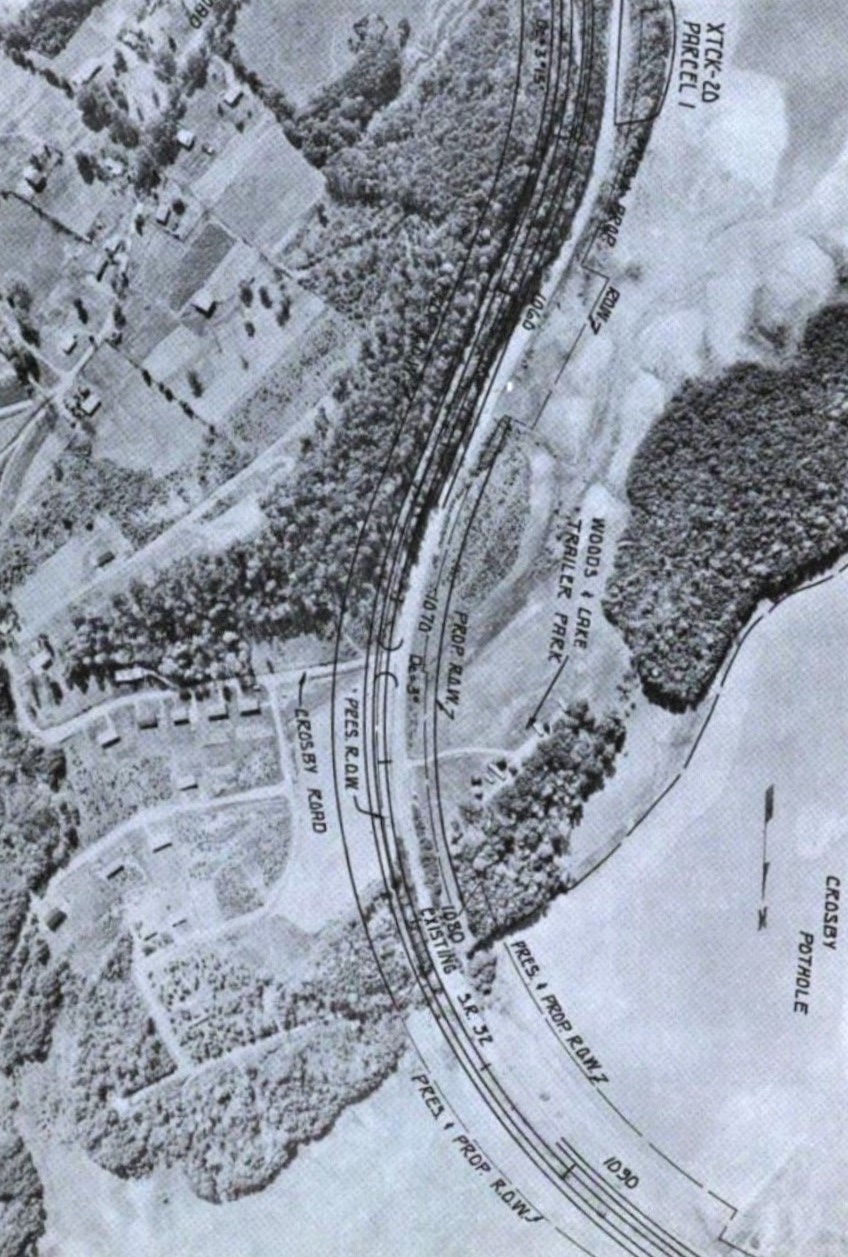
Right of way drawing of U.S. Route 25E for widening project, 1981

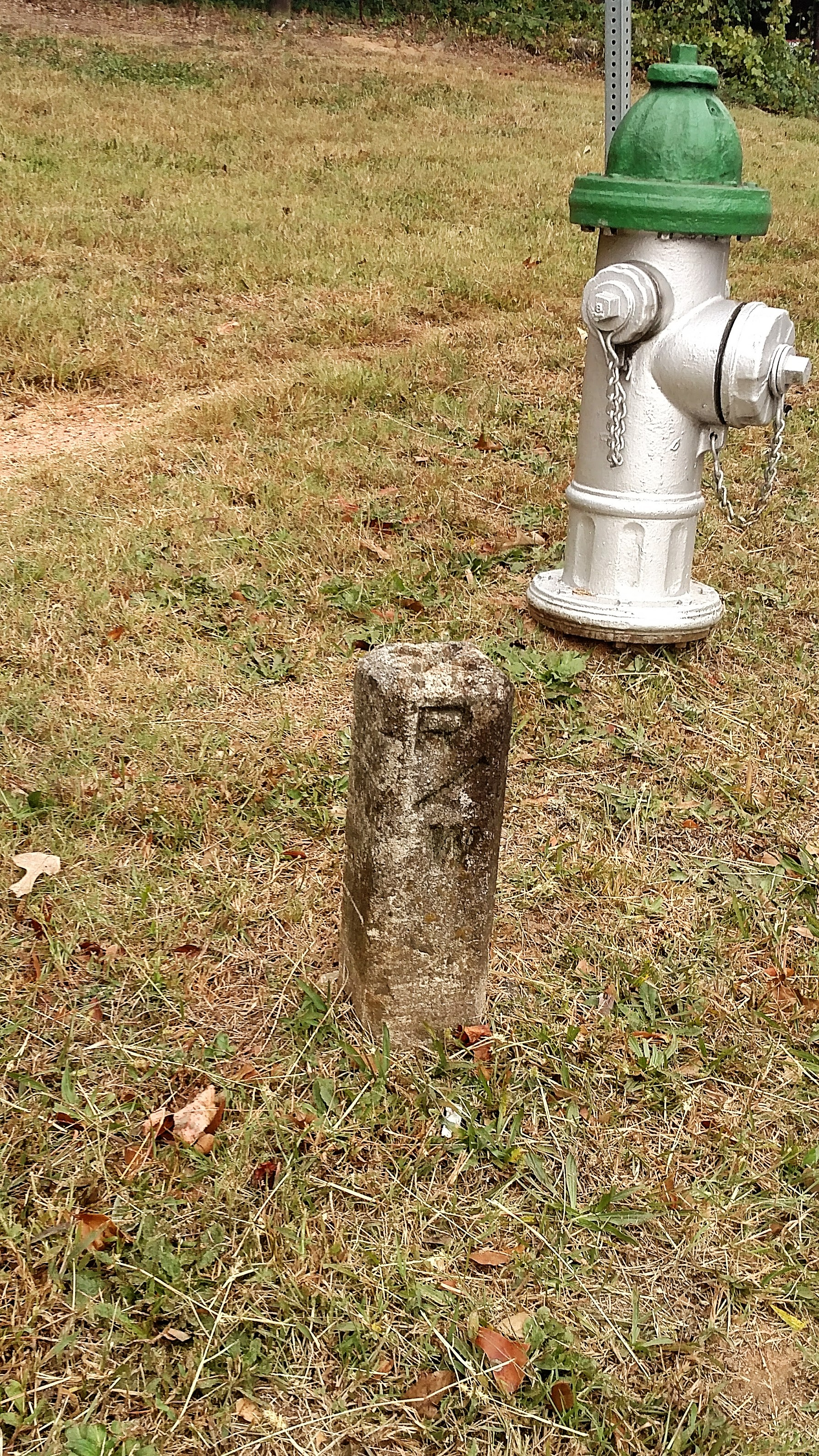
Right of way highway marker in Athens, Georgia

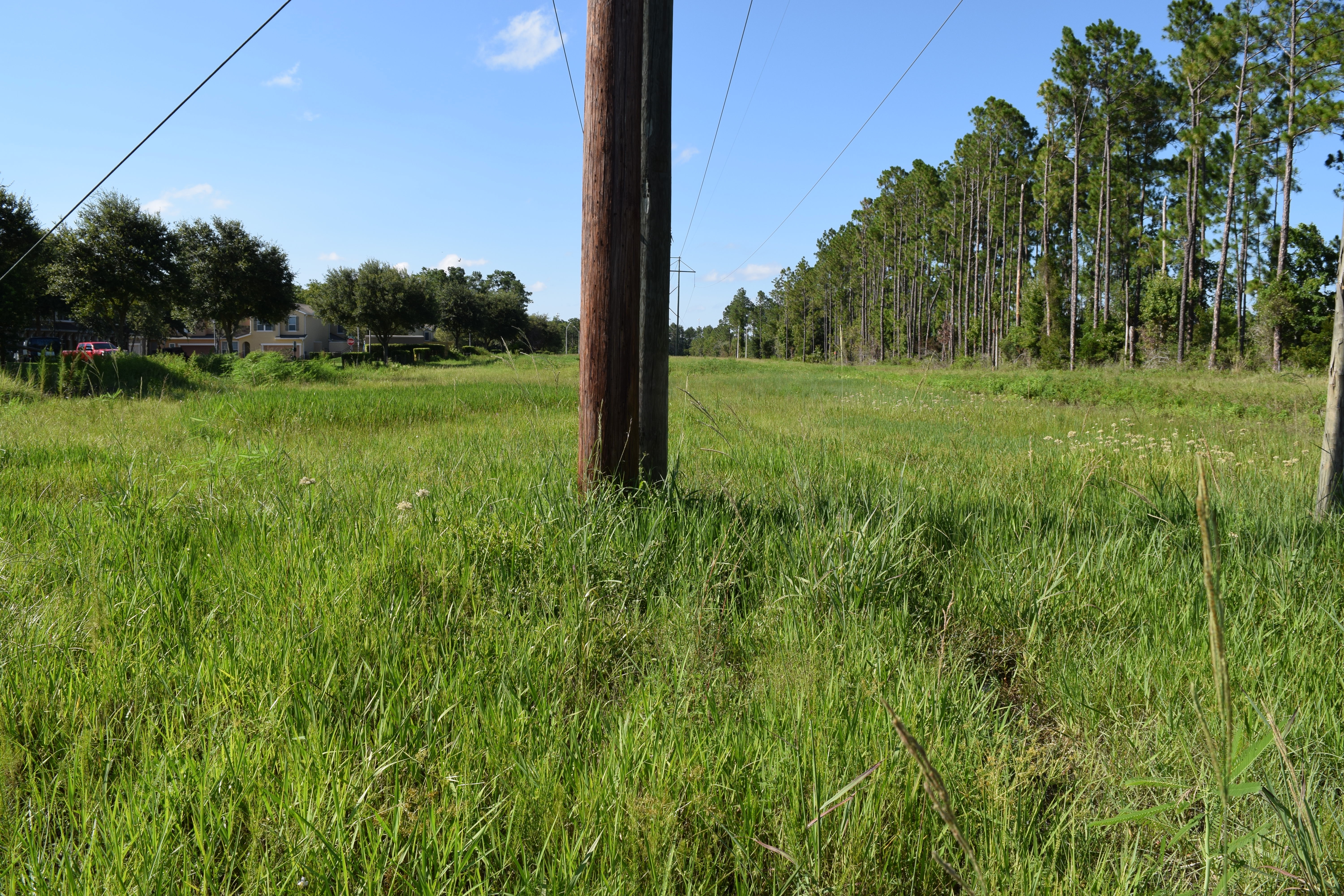
Julington-Durbin Peninsula power line right of way

A right of way (also right-of-way) is a specific route that people, animals, vehicles, watercraft, or utility lines travel, or the legal status that gives them the right to do so. Rights-of-way in the physical sense include controlled-access highways, railroads, canals, hiking paths, bridle paths for horses, bicycle paths, the routes taken by high-voltage lines (also known as wayleave), utility tunnels, or simply the paved or unpaved local roads used by different types of traffic. The term highway is often used in legal contexts in the sense of "main way" to mean any public-use road or any public-use road or path. Some are restricted as to mode of use (for example, pedestrians only, pedestrians, horse and cycle riders, vehicles capable of a minimum speed).

Rights-of-way in the legal sense (the right to pass through or to operate a transportation facility) can be created in a number of different ways. In some cases, a government, transportation company, or conservation non-profit purchases the full ownership of real estate, including everything above and below the ground. Many rights-of-way are created instead by easement, which is a right to cross that does not include full ownership of the land. For example, the original owner may still retain mineral rights under the right-of-way easement, but not the right to exclude people from passing through certain parts of what would otherwise be private land.

== Creation and elimination ==
=== Canals, railroads, and government roads ===
A government may create a right of way on land it already owns, for example in a public park, or on "unowned" land, or it can seize land (or an easement) by eminent domain (compulsory purchase). Private companies can purchase land or easements, and in some cases (such as private toll roads (turnpikes), canals, and railroads in the 18th and 19th centuries) have been given the power of eminent domain for the limited purpose of providing a certain type of transportation between specified locations. In the Western United States, the transcontinental railroad was funded by government land grants that gave railroads both the physical right-of-way and surrounding land that could be sold after becoming valuable parcels connected to the long-distance transportation network. In new developments, the government may create the road network in cooperation with the land-owning developer or parcel owners—easement boundaries are defined in writing, and public roads formally "dedicated" as government-maintained. In some jurisdictions, utility companies may by law have a general easement to access certain areas when necessary to construct and maintain their networks. In many cases they must request permission from the owner to expand or perform construction activities on a government or private right-of-way.

When a road, railroad, or canal is no longer needed, the effect on property rights depends on the jurisdiction and how the right of way was created. Many jurisdictions have a formal process of voluntary discontinuation or abandonment, often involving public comment. This allows the government to clarify which facilities it will and will not spend money to maintain, which can affect property owners and values. It also clearly distinguishes between transportation facilities which are temporarily not being used versus those which are permanently out of use, and provides for orderly transfer of rights. When an easement is terminated, full rights automatically revert to the owner of the real estate over which the right of way passed. Some jurisdictions have a separate formal process for terminating disused right-of-way easements involuntarily, such as adverse abandonment for railroads in the United States. This allows property owners to regain full use after a railroad stops running but does not initiate the legal abandonment process on its own.

Railbanking is a legal maneuver that avoids full abandonment, preserving a railroad easement for future reactivation without reverting property rights to real estate owners. Rail trails are often constructed on rights-of-way that no longer host active railroads, putting the property to productive use while preventing obstructions like buildings or crossing infrastructure from being built. These may be used for recreation or for bicycle commuting, given the typical gentle slopes and connectivity of railroad rights-of-way.

Some courts will extend the real property boundaries of abutters to the middle of the abandoned right-of-way, even if the right-of-way is outside the boundaries defined in the property deed. Treating the property as if it were an undocumented easement in this way avoids long, narrow strips of unproductive land. This is known as the centerline presumption (formerly strip and gore doctrine). This doctrine may also be used to assert mineral rights under neighboring government-maintained roads in some jurisdictions, a question which has become more relevant since the invention of horizontal drilling.

In other jurisdictions or circumstances, the right-of-way is simply a normal parcel which happens to have an unusual shape, and it is up to the owner to sell it to abutters, a conservation non-profit, another transportation company, or some other buyer. Full land ownership generally cannot be lost due to disuse, but abandoned right-of-way land can be taken by the government due to non-payment of property tax, by escheat if no private owner can be found (due to death without heirs or disincorporation), or by eminent domain if it wishes to return the property to some productive use. Property outside of linear corridors, especially if improved with buildings (such as railroad stations and large highway interchanges) is more likely to be fully owned and sold off as real estate. Legal discontinuation or abandonment may trigger public auction or negotiated sale of government-owned land.

=== Private roads and other easements ===
Some right-of-way easements are created because the only way to access certain parcels from a public way is over the private property of a single neighbor. In these cases, the owner of the "servient" estate (which is the one being crossed) may simply give permission, or the "dominant" estate (the one needing access) may purchase the easement, for example to construct a driveway. Such easements are attached to the dominant estate, or appurtenant. The dominant estate cannot sell the easement separately from the neighboring property, and if the property is sold it would convey to the new owners. Courts may declare this type of easement exists as a matter of equity to resolve a dispute, if the easement was apparently left out of property deeds despite obvious necessity, if there was an apparent intent to create an easement but this was never formalized, or in some jurisdictions if an undocumented right of way has been in continuous use for a certain number of years without obstruction by the property owner. Changes to circumstances (such as construction of a new road that connects to the dominant estate), disuse, and obstruction by the property owner may affect this type of right.

In other geographic situations, several neighbors will agree to maintain (or inherit from the original developer) a private road that connects their properties, either as communally owned or as a contractual, appurtenant easement. Private ownership typically gives the owners more power, such as the right to restrict parking to owners and their guests. Traffic laws (such as obeying speed limits and stop signs) typically still apply to private roads if they are open to the general public.

Transferrable easements (such as the right to use a specific boat ramp not used by the property owner or operate it as a concession) are known as in gross and are typically created by arrangement.

=== Easements that benefit the public ===
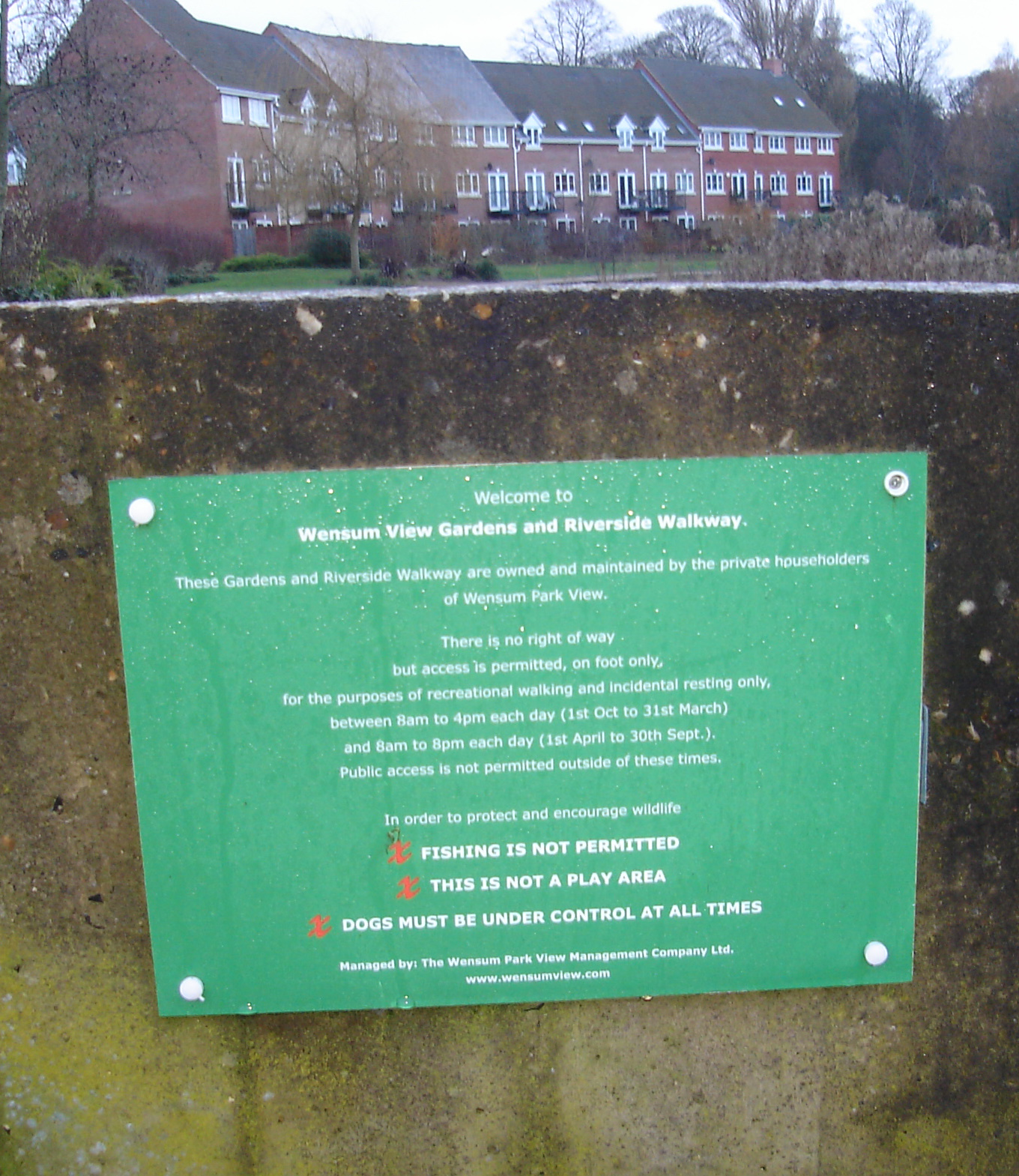
River Wensum permissive path, Norfolk, England

Right-of-way easements that benefit the general public are often created for foot, bridle, mountain bike, and ATV paths (often carrying a mix of users). These routes are all formally highways, but have legally restricted modes of use. Such rights-of-way might extend a recreational trail network from land owned by the government or a conservation non-profit, to connect trails to public roads, to make long-distance trails, or provide access to a beach or waterfront. Especially in common law jurisdictions, these can be created by longstanding use, also known as easement by prescription. They can also be purchased or by a government or conservation group or created by eminent domain. Property owners can also explicitly grant permission to use a route, either through a deed restriction or informal means such as posted signs, and may place restrictions on times or types of traffic allowed. Whether this permission can be revoked or expire from disuse depends considerably on the legal jurisdiction, how it was granted, and the circumstances of public use. Some of these "permissive paths" are closed once a year to prevent the creation of a permanent public easement.

Some jurisdictions legally recognize the right to roam—to move through any undeveloped land unless otherwise posted or fenced. This allows wandering beyond established trails. Even without a general right to roam, not all rights-of-way have a physical indication of boundaries, and some easements do not specify any particular path to be taken when crossing. Some easements permit certain recreational activities across a broad swath of land, as do many government-owned conservation areas.

Some public rights-of-way are negotiated with government as a part of property development. This can result in a public-use right of way, such as an urban waterfront walkway, the public right to use a lobby as a shortcut during business hours, or public access to recreational land such as an urban park (which may include activities not limited to simply passing through).

== Waterways ==
In England and Wales under current law, public access to rivers is restricted, and only 2% of all rivers have public access rights. The Rivers Access Campaign is being undertaken by the British Canoe Union (BCU) to open up the inland water-ways in England and Wales on behalf of members of the public. Canals are not, in general, public rights of way in England and Wales. Waterways in the care of the Canal & River Trust are accessible for use by boats, canoeists, paddleboarders and other watercraft upon payment of an appropriate licence fee.

Walkers and cyclists can freely use the extensive network of towpaths that run alongside the canals in England and Wales. See Towpath#Britain for information on the legal status of towpaths.

In Canada rivers are crown land and there is a legal "right to navigate over navigable waters. However, the difficult legal question is what constitutes navigable waters. There is no federal or provincial law defining this, nor is there any list of waters the public can use".

Under federal law, all natural inland waterways of the United States are classifiable as "navigable" or "non-navigable". Navigable rivers, lakes, ponds, and streams are treated as "public highways", open to surface passage by anyone. The doctrine of navigable servitude gives the federal government primary regulatory power over navigable waters, but users are also subject to state police power. Ownership of non-tidal non-navigable waters goes along with the submerged land, and issues of public access and trespass are treated similarly to private property on land. This may be determined by explicit deed, or implicitly as an extension of ownership of adjacent land, depending on the local ownership history and state law.

The right to roam in northern European countries, including Scotland, usually includes rivers and lakes.

Freedom of navigation is generally provided on ocean waters under the law of the sea, subject to national laws. Public access to tidal shores depends on the jurisdiction.

== Rail right of way ==
In the United States, railroad right-of-way easements carry with them, under applicable state laws, the right to control access by the public and even by the owner of the underlying land. Most U.S. railroads employ their own police forces, who can arrest and prosecute trespassers found on their rights-of-way. Some railroad rights-of-way (both active and disused) include recreational rail trails.

In Canada railroad rights of way are regulated by federal law. In October 1880 the building of Canada's first transcontinental rail line, the Canadian Pacific Railway, started. It was built by a consortium contracted by the government, and financed by CA$25 million (Note: about CA$860 million today, indexed by retail prices.) in credit and required 25 million acres (100,000 km^{2}) of land. In addition, the government defrayed surveying costs and exempted the railway from property taxes for 20 years.

In the United Kingdom, railway companies received the right to "resume" land for a right of way, by means of private Acts of Parliament. Resumption means compulsory acquisition of land.

=== Designations of railroad right of way ===
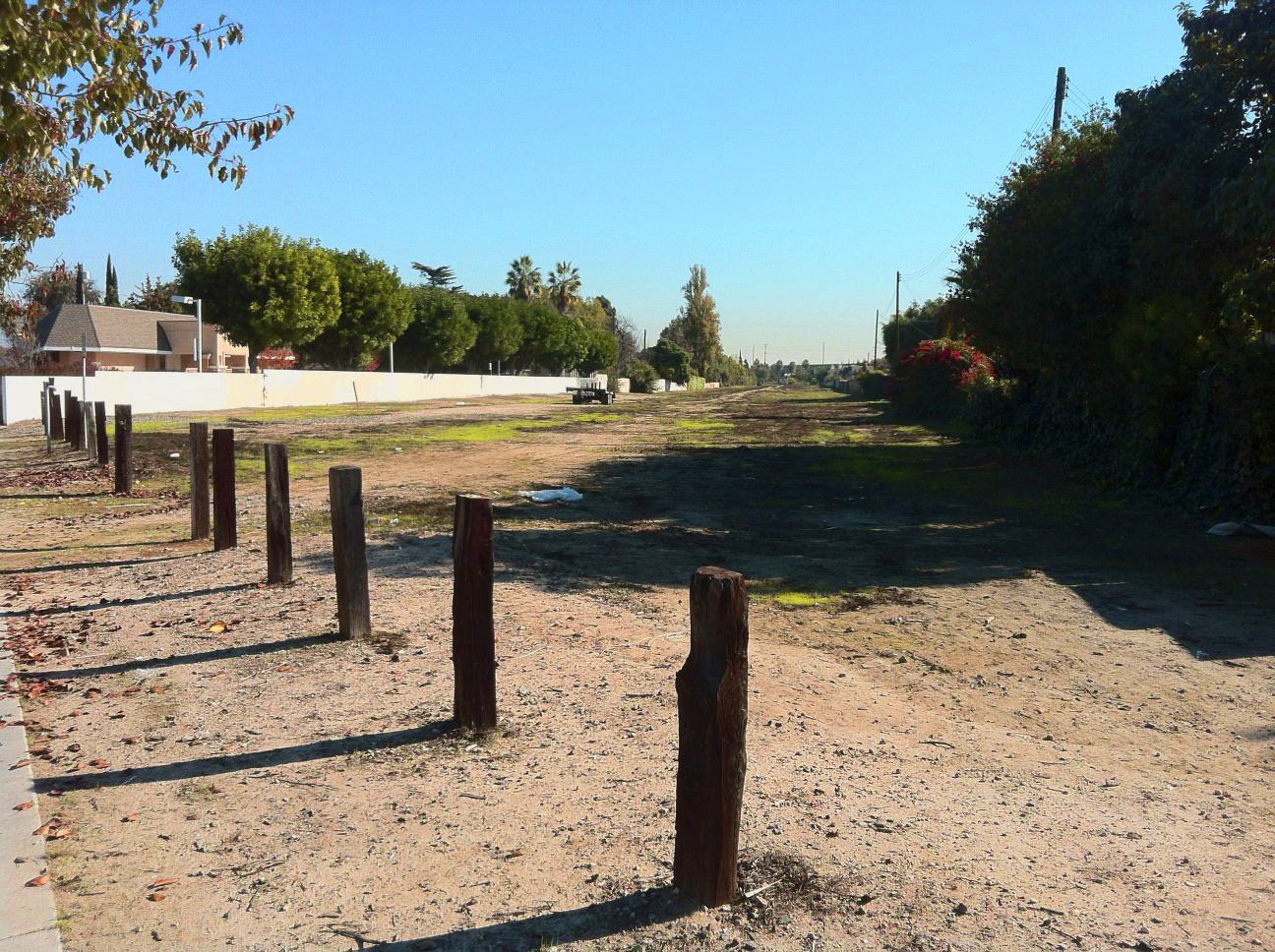
Right of way of the out of service Pacific Electric in Garden Grove, California from left middleground to right background

The various designations of railroad right of way are as follows:

- Active track is any track that is used regularly or even only once in a while.
- Out of service or moth-balled means the right of way is preserved, and the railroad retains the right to activate it. The line could be out of service for decades. Thus track or crossings that have been removed need to be replaced or reinstated.
- Embargo means the track is removed, but the right of way is preserved and usually is converted into a walking or cycling path or other such use.
- Abandonment is a lengthy formal process by which the railroad gives up all rights to the line. In most cases the track is removed and sold for scrap and any grade crossings are redone. The line will never be active again. The right of way easement reverts to the adjoining property owners.

=== Concerns about constructions of buildings around railway right-of-way ===
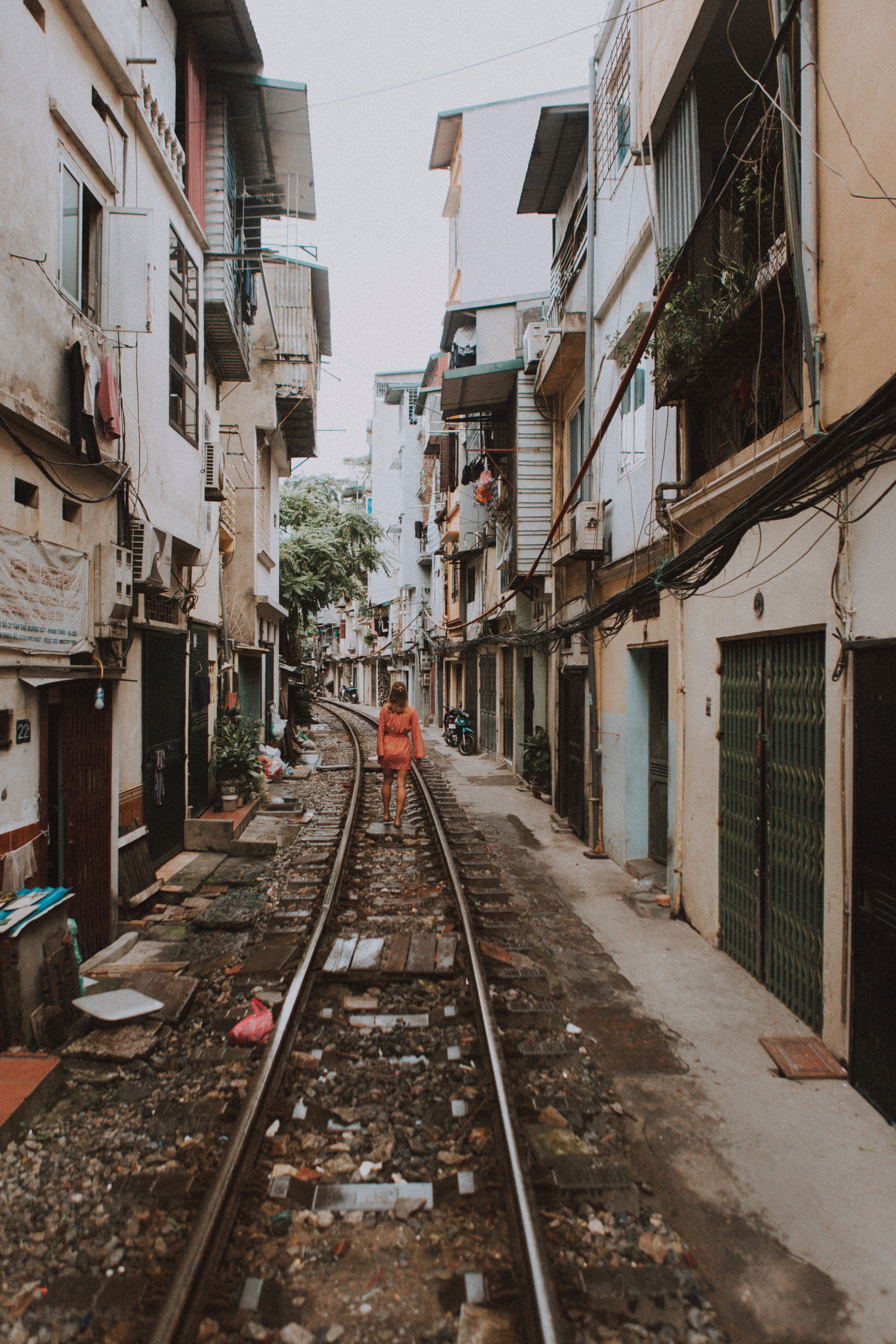
Train Street, Hanoi in 2017

Construction of houses/buildings beside railway right-of-way presents a significant safety risk. For example, the Hanoi Department of Tourism in Vietnam ordered the permanent closure of cafes and shops along Hanoi Train Street for safety reasons despite its being a popular destination for foreign tourists in the city.

== Traditional paths ==
=== France ===
There is a system of about 120,000 kilometres of well-marked footpaths in France: traditional rights of way take the form of servitude de passage (right of passage) and droit de marche-pied (right to walk, alongside canals and canalised rivers). Many were formerly the main routes between villages and are often "steeper and more direct than modern roads". There are also, in addition, sentiers de grande randonnée (long distance trails).

=== Republic of Ireland ===
In the Republic of Ireland, pedestrian rights of way to churches, known as mass paths, have existed for centuries. In other cases, the modern law is unclear; Victorian era laws on easements protect a property owner's rights, amplified by the 1937 constitution, which stipulate that a right of way has to be specifically dedicated to public use. Opposing these, those claiming general rights of way hark back to an anti-landed gentry position that lasted from the Land War of the 1880s to the end of British rule in 1922. Rights of way can be asserted by adverse possession, but proving continuous use can be difficult. A case heard in 2010 concerning claims over the Lissadell House estate was based on the historical laws, since amended by the Land and Conveyancing Law Reform Act, 2009.

The 2009 act abolished the doctrine of lost modern grant, and allows a user to claim a right of way after 12 years of use across private land owned by another, 30 years on state land and 60 years on the foreshore. The claimant must apply to the courts, and have their claim confirmed by a court order, and then have it duly registered on the title deeds, a lengthy process. The user must prove "enjoyment without force, without secrecy and without the oral or written consent of the […] owner", a restatement of the centuries-old principle of Nec vi, nec clam, nec precario. A court order granting a right of way is personal to the applicant for their lifetime, and cannot be inherited or assigned.

=== England and Wales ===
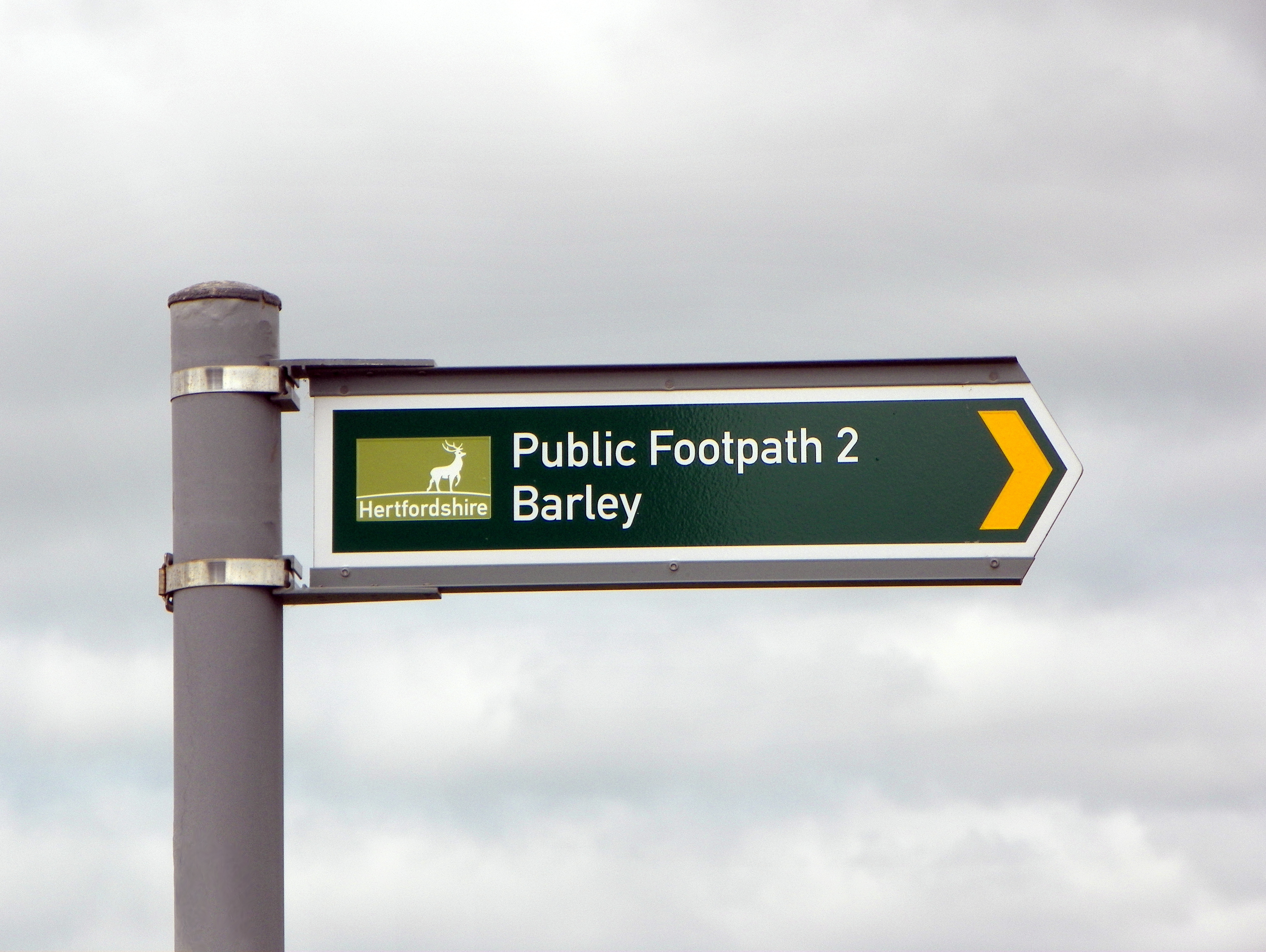
Hertfordshire public footpath, England

In England and Wales, other than in the 12 Inner London boroughs and the City of London, public rights of way are paths on which the public have a legally protected right to pass and re-pass. The law in England and Wales differs from that in Scotland in that rights of way only exist where they are so designated (or are able to be designated if not already) whereas in Scotland any route that meets certain conditions is defined as a right of way, and in addition there is a general presumption of access to the countryside. Private rights of way or easements also exist.

Footpaths, bridleways and other rights of way in most of England and Wales are shown on definitive maps. A definitive map is a record of public rights of way in England and Wales. In law it is the definitive record of where a right of way is located. The highway authority (normally the county council, or unitary authority in areas with a one-tier system) has a statutory duty to maintain a definitive map, though in national parks the national park authority usually maintains the map.

=== Scotland ===
In Scotland, a right of way is a route over which the public has been able to pass unhindered for at least 20 years. The route must link two "public places", such as villages, churches or roads. Unlike in England and Wales there is no obligation on Scottish local authorities to signpost rights of way. However the charity Scotways, formed in 1845 to protect rights of way, records and signs the routes.

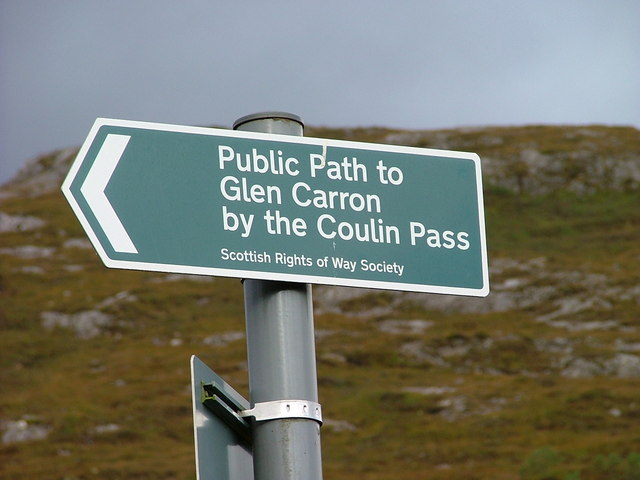
Scotways sign for a "Public Path"

The Land Reform (Scotland) Act 2003 codified in law traditional, non-motorised, access practices on land and water. Under the 2003 act a plain language explanation of rights is published by Scottish Natural Heritage: the Scottish Outdoor Access Code. Certain categories of land are excluded from this presumption of open access, such as railway land, airfields and private gardens.

Section 4 of the access code explains how land managers are permitted to request the public to avoid certain areas for a limited period in order to undertake management tasks, however longer term restrictions must be approved by the local authority. The ability to temporarily restrict public access is commonly exercised without notice by shooting, forestry or wind farm operators, but does not extend to public rights of way. In Scotland the public have a higher degree of freedom on rights of way than on open land. Blocking a right of way in Scotland is a criminal obstruction under the Highways Act, just as in England and Wales, but the lack of publicly accessible rights of way maps in Scotland makes it very difficult to enforce.

The unofficial National Catalogue of Rights of Way (CROW), compiled by the Scottish Rights of Way and Access Society (Scotways), in partnership with Scottish Natural Heritage, and the help of local authorities. There are three categories of rights of way in CROW:

- Vindicated – routes declared to be rights of way by some legal process
- Asserted – routes which have been accepted as rights of way by the landowner, or where local authorities are prepared to take legal action to protect them
- Claimed – other right of way routes, which have not been vindicated or asserted, but which appear to meet the common law conditions and have not yet been legally disputed

=== Northern Ireland ===
Northern Ireland has very few public rights of way and access to land in Northern Ireland is more restricted than other parts of the UK, so that in many areas walkers can only enjoy the countryside because of the goodwill and tolerance of landowners. Permission has been obtained from all landowners across whose land the Waymarked Ways and Ulster Way traverse. Much of Northern Ireland's public land is accessible, e.g. Water Service and Forest Service land, as is land owned and managed by organisations such as the National Trust and the Woodland Trust.

Northern Ireland has much the same legal system as England, including concepts about the ownership of land and public rights of way, but it has its own court structure, system of precedents and specific legislation concerning rights-of-way and right-to-roam.

=== Canada ===
In Québec City, Canada, which was originally built on the riverside bluff Cap Diamant in the 17th century, there are strategically placed public stairways that link the bluff to the lower parts of the city. The Upper City is the site of Old Québec's most significant historical sites, including 17th- and 18th-century chapels, the Citadel and the city ramparts. The Breakneck Stairs or Breakneck Steps (French: Escalier casse-cou), Quebec City's oldest stairway, were built in 1635. Originally called escalier Champlain "Champlain Stairs", escalier du Quêteux "Beggars' Stairs", or escalier de la Basse-Ville "Lower Town Stairs", they were given their current name in the mid-19th century, because of their steepness. The stairs have been restored several times, including an 1889 renovation by Charles Baillargé.

Some rights of way in North America are hundreds of years old. In Newfoundland the East Coast Trail, established by a group of hiking enthusiasts, makes use of traditional trails between local communities along the coast of the Avalon Peninsula.

=== United States ===
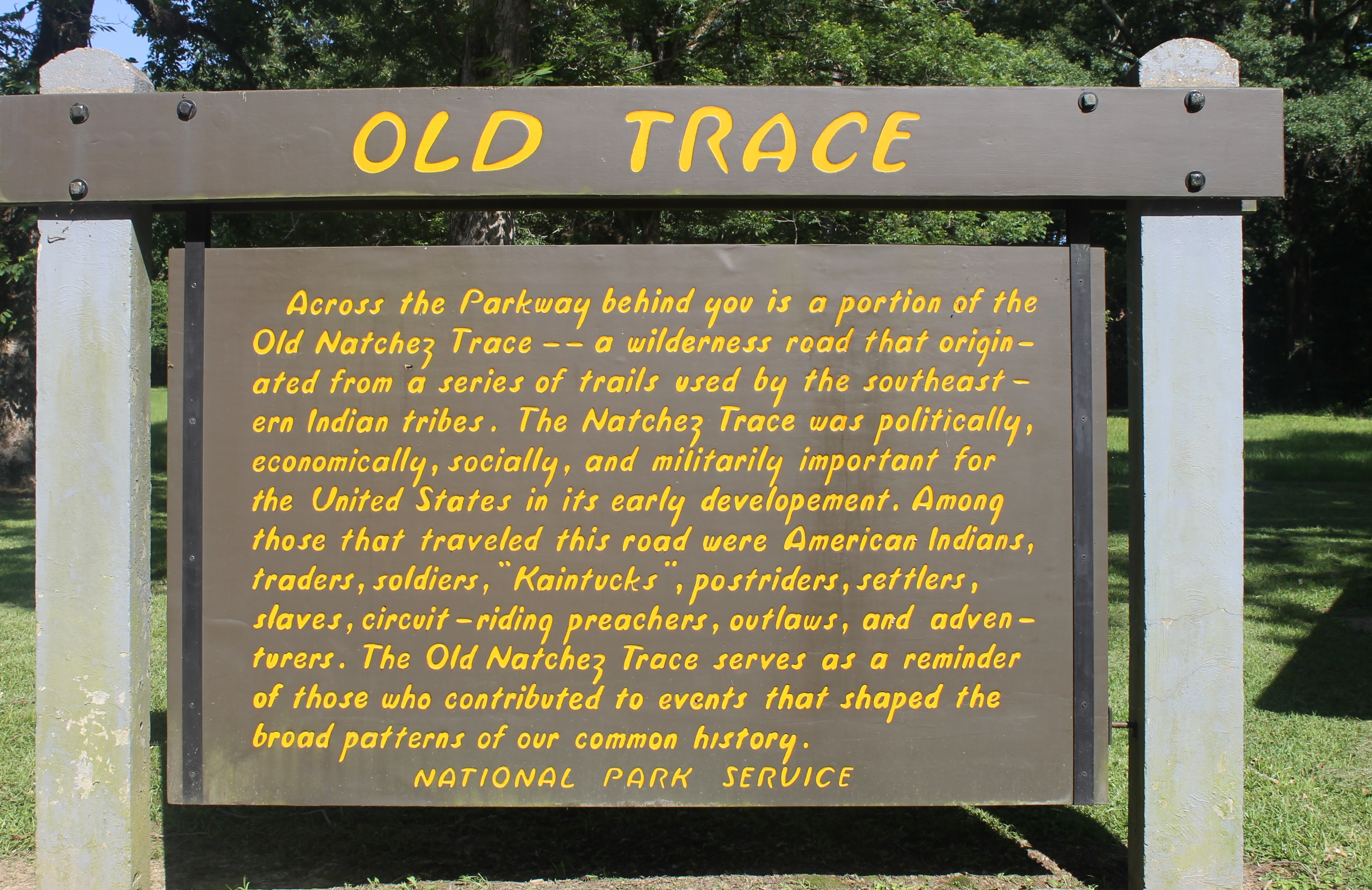
Natchez Trace National Historic Trail

Rights of way have been created in the US, both by historic use (prescription) and grants made by the national and state governments, local authorities and private landowners.

Trails that had been established by indigenous peoples were used by Europeans settling North America. Some became highways, while others have been incorporated recently into hiking trails. Examples include: Natchez Trace; Santa Fe Trail; Bozeman Trail.

In Seattle, there are over 500 public stairways.

=== Philippines ===
In the Philippines, right of way disputes often arise when landowners block access to paths or roads that have been used by the public or specific individuals for a considerable period. The issue typically centers on whether the affected parties have a legal right to use the route that traverses private property to reach a public road or a national highway. This causes delays in many infrastructure projects, and a laborious process at the local government level.

== See also ==
=== Types ===
- Alley – Narrow street that usually runs between, behind, or within buildings
- Byway (United Kingdom) – UK track more minor than a road
  - Restricted byways – Byways that are generally open to pedestrians, equestrians and cyclists but (for example) only residents' and farm traffic may be motorised.
- Corpse road – Road historically used to transport corpses to cemeteries
- Drovers' road – Route for driving livestock on foot
- Green lane (road) – Unpaved rural route wider than a footpath
- Historic roads and trails – Historical trail or road
- Military roads of Scotland – Road network created in the wake of the Jacobite rebellions
- Railway track – Rail infrastructure (sometimes known as "the permanent way").
- Throughway – Highway designed for high-speed, regulated traffic flow
- Thoroughfare – Transportation route connecting one location to another
- Toll road – Roadway for which a fee (or toll) is assessed for passage
- Trail – Path for mostly non-motorized travel through a natural area

=== Related rights ===
- Air rights – Type of real estate ownership right
- Freedoms of the air – Set of international commercial aviation rights
- Right to light – Form of easement in English law
- Right to property – Human right to own property
- Rights of way in England and Wales

=== Other ===
- Easements in English law
- Nec vi, nec clam, nec precario – "without force, without secrecy, without permission"
- Noise barrier – Exterior structure on infrastructure used to prevent loud sounds from escaping
- Trespass – Legal concept of intentional interference
