= Uti possidetis juris =

Principle of international law

Uti possidetis juris or uti possidetis iuris is a principle of international law according to which newly formed sovereign states should inherit the internal borders that their preceding dependent area had prior to their independence.

== History ==
Uti possidetis juris is a modified form of uti possidetis; created for the purpose of avoiding terra nullius, the original version of uti possidetis began as a Roman law governing the rightful possession of property. During the medieval period it evolved into a law governing international relations and had by the 1820s been modified for situations related to newly independent states.

== Application ==
Uti possidetis juris has been applied in modern history to such regions as South America, Africa, the Middle East, and the Soviet Union, and numerous other regions where centralized governments were broken up. It is often applied to prevent foreign intervention by eliminating any contested terra nullius, or no man's land, that foreign powers could claim, or to prevent disputes that could emerge with the possibility of redrawing the borders of new states after their independence.

The doctrine has been asserted in relation to Israeli sovereignty over the West Bank and the Gaza Strip. Israel withdrew from Gaza in 2005 and while it is possible to argue that Israel voluntarily abandoned any claims of territorial sovereignty it might have had there, there is no unequivocal documentary evidence of such an abandonment. The Oslo Accords gave the Palestinians territorial jurisdiction, although Israel was allowed to maintain security control pending the conclusion of final status talks. These talks were, however, never finalized.

The principle was also applied by the Badinter Arbitration Committee established by the Council of Ministers of the European Economic Community in opinions related to the disintegration of Yugoslavia, specifically no. 2, on self-determination, and no. 3, on the nature of the boundaries between Croatia and Serbia and between Bosnia and Herzegovina and Serbia.

Argentina and Chile base their territorial claims in Antarctica on the uti possidetis juris principle in the same manner as their now-recognized Patagonian claims.

== See also ==
- Decolonization
- Dissolution (politics)
- Successor states
- Timeline of national independence
- List of border conflicts
- Uti possidetis, an article about the term and its history
