= Status quo ante bellum =

Latin phrase meaning 'the state existing before the war'

Status quo ante bellum is a Latin phrase meaning 'the situation as it existed before the war'. The term was originally used in treaties to refer to the withdrawal of enemy troops and the restoration of prewar leadership. When used as such, it means that no side gains or loses any territorial, economic, or political rights. This contrasts with uti possidetis, where each side retains whatever territory and other property it holds at the end of the war.

== Historical examples ==
An early example is the treaty that ended the Byzantine–Sasanian War of 602–628 between the Eastern Roman and the Sasanian Persian Empires. The Persians had occupied Asia Minor, Palestine and Egypt. After a successful Roman counteroffensive in Mesopotamia finally ended the war, the integrity of Rome's eastern frontier as it was prior to 602 was fully restored. Both empires were exhausted after this war, and neither was ready to defend itself when the armies of Islam emerged from Arabia in 632.

Another example is the sixteenth-century Abyssinian–Adal war between the Muslim Adal Sultanate and Christian Ethiopian Empire, which ended in a stalemate. Both empires were exhausted after this war, and neither was ready to defend itself against the Oromo Migrations.

=== War of 1812 ===
The War of 1812 was fought between the United States and the United Kingdom, which was concluded with the Treaty of Ghent in 1814. During negotiations, British diplomats had suggested ending the war uti possidetis. While American diplomats demanded cession from Canada and British officials also pressed for a pro-British Indian barrier state in the Midwest and keeping parts of Maine they captured (i.e., New Ireland) during the war, the final treaty left neither gains nor losses in land for the United States or the United Kingdom's Canadian colonies.

=== Football War ===
The Football War, also known as the Soccer War or 100 Hour War, was a brief war fought between El Salvador and Honduras in 1969. It ended in a ceasefire and status quo ante bellum due to intervention by the Organization of American States.

=== Indo-Pakistani War of 1965 ===
The Indo-Pakistani War of 1965 was a culmination of skirmishes that took place between April 1965 and September 1965 between Pakistan and India. The conflict began following Pakistan's Operation Gibraltar, which was designed to infiltrate forces into Jammu and Kashmir to precipitate an insurgency against Indian rule. This war concluded in a stalemate with no permanent territorial changes (see Tashkent Declaration).

=== Iran–Iraq War ===
The Iran–Iraq War lasted from September 1980 to August 1988. "The war left the borders unchanged. Three years later, as war with the Western powers loomed, Saddam Hussein recognized Iranian rights over the eastern half of the Shatt al-Arab, a reversion to the status quo ante bellum that he had repudiated a decade earlier." In exchange, Iran gave a promise not to invade Iraq while the latter was busy in Kuwait.

=== Kargil War ===
The Kargil War was an armed conflict between India and Pakistan that took place between 3 May and 26 July 1999 in the Kargil district of Jammu and Kashmir and elsewhere along the Line of Control (LoC). The war started with the infiltration of Pakistani soldiers and armed insurgents into positions on the Indian side of the LoC. After two months of fighting, the Indian military regained most of its positions on the Indian side, and the Pakistani forces withdrew to their peacetime positions. The war ended with no territorial changes on either side.
