= Hanoi Train Street =

Street in Hanoi, Vietnam

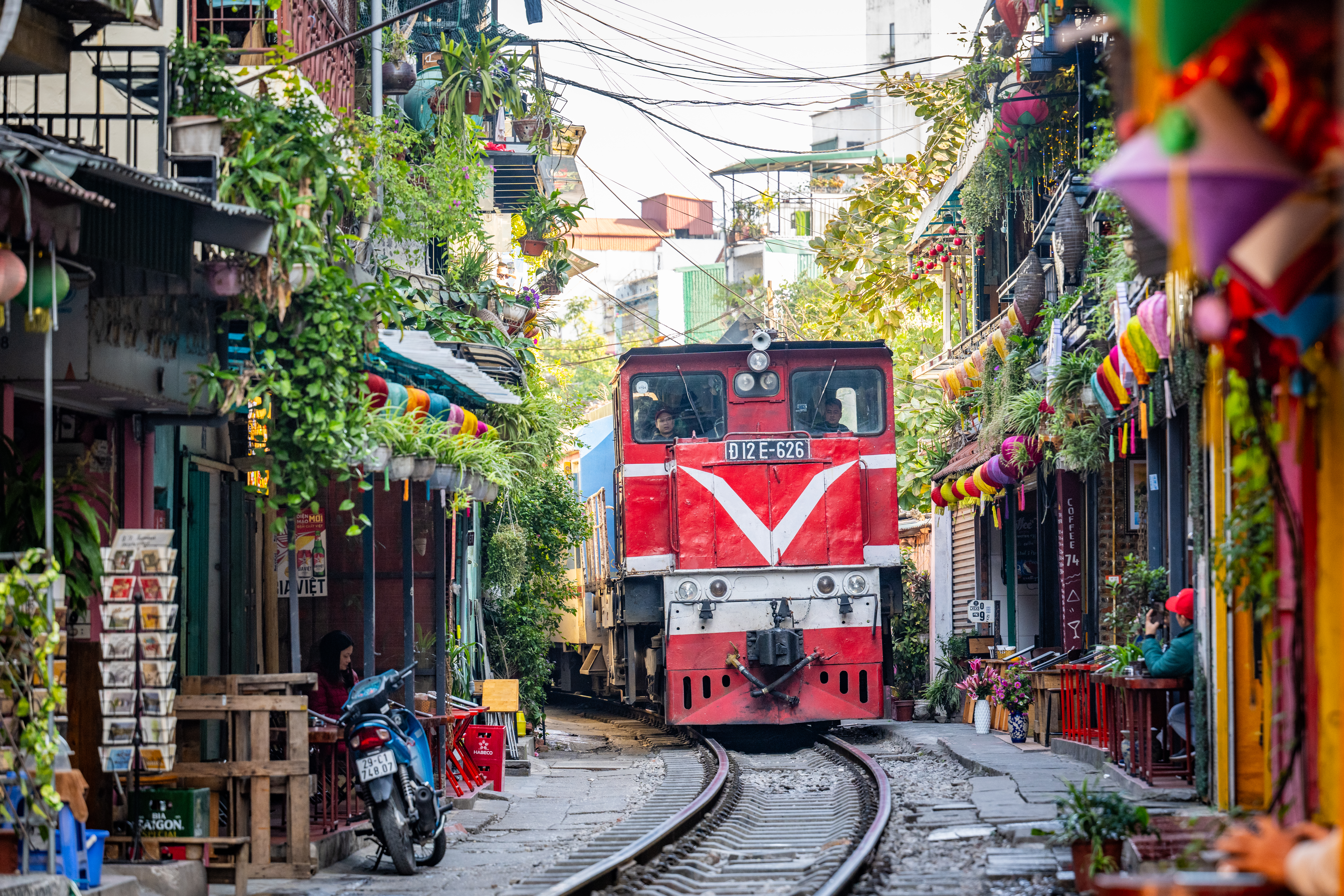
- The street in 2023
- Interactive map of Hanoi Train Street
- Length: 0.85 km (0.53 mi)
- Location: Old Quarter, Hanoi, Vietnam
- Coordinates: 21.03°N 105.8439°E
- From: Phùng Hưng Street
- Major junctions: Điện Biên Phủ Street, Lý Nam Đế Street
- South end: Trần Phú Street

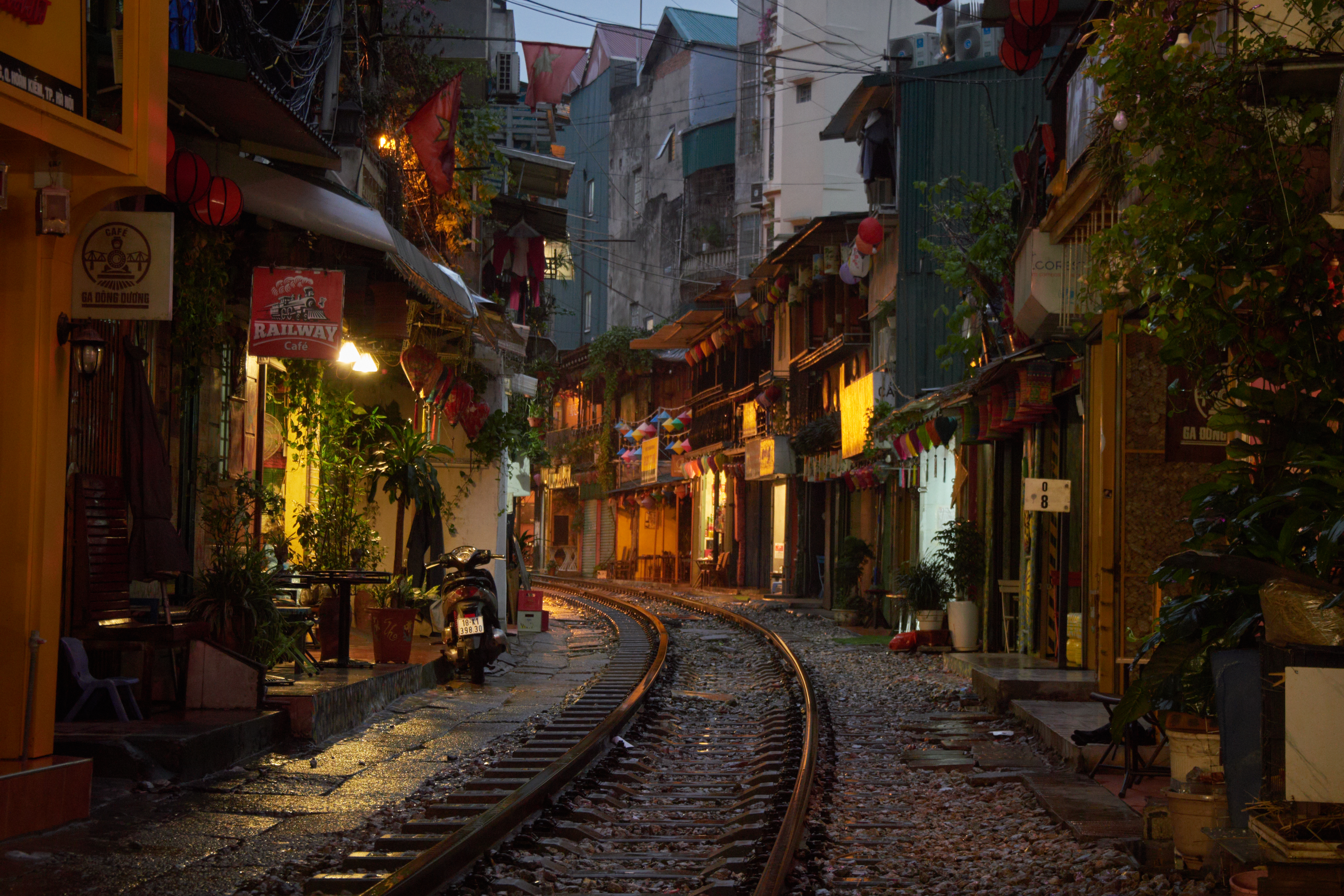
Hanoi Train Street at dusk

Train Street or Railway Street (Vietnamese: Phố Đường Tàu Hà Nội) is a narrow train bypass in Hanoi which several times daily sees a train pass close to buildings on either side of the tracks (the width of the train takes up nearly the entirety of the "train street"). It is situated specifically, along Điện Biên Phủ and Phùng Hưng streets, opposite Dropin Cafe and the main Hanoi Railway Station. The track was built by the French in 1902 and is still an active rail line as of 2026.

The train passes several times daily, on the single track line running north out of Hanoi railway station (thus not the rail line between Hanoi and Ho Chi Minh City in the south). Residents living alongside the tracks clear their belongings from the narrow space when trains approach. Often during other times, they use the space for daily activities, like drinking tea and playing board games. A writer on the Hanoi Old Quarter travel website wrote: "Hanoi Train Street encapsulates an extraordinary portrait of local life a real-time illustration where trains routinely coalesce with the rhythm of resident sources of pride and heritage."

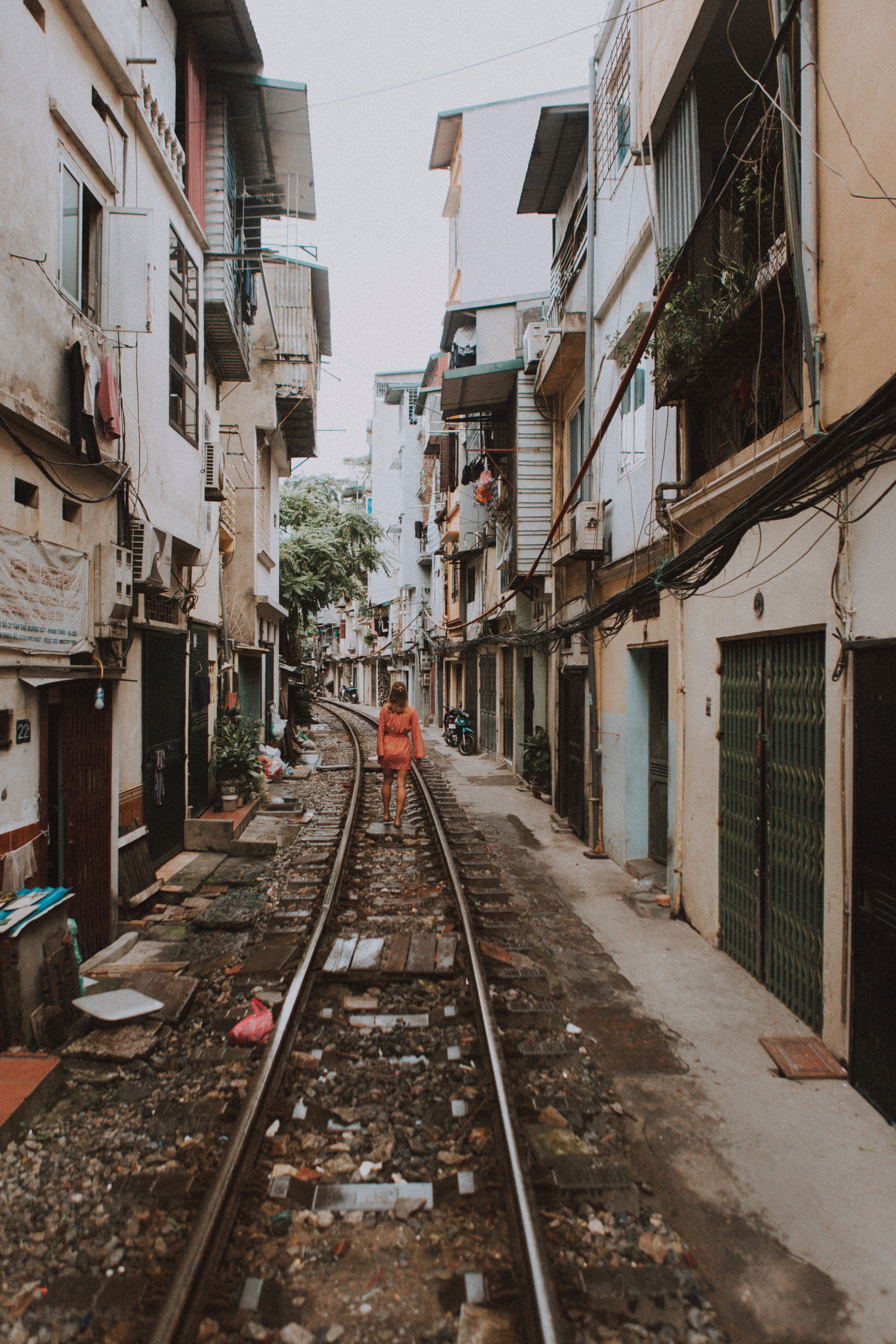
Train Street, Hanoi in 2017

== As a tourist attraction ==
The street developed into a tourist destination in Hanoi before local authorities closed it to visitors in October 2019, citing safety concerns. Tourists would often stop and take pictures to post on social media along the narrow alley. The area includes cafes and homes, but local officials have also reported concerns about unauthorized residents and drug use in the vicinity. The overcrowded street caused the need to reroute a local train on October 6, 2019, prompting the closure. Local cafes have sprung up to serve the bustling tourist trade along the street and owners are concerned over the loss of business the closure will bring. The VnExpress newspaper cites a train driver that has had three close calls with tourists on the tracks, once stopping only meters from the woman who was taking pictures of the train.

Safety concerns have increased in recent years as tourism has grown. Train drivers have reported making emergency stops when visitors did not clear the tracks despite warnings. On June 18, 2024, a viral video showed a woman risking her life by jumping onto the track to pose for a picture before she was rescued by a bystander. In another incident, an unidentified South Korean tourist survived being hit by a train.

In October 2019, Vietnamese government directed businesses along the train track to close and implemented barriers and police presence to restrict tourist access to the street. This prompted thousands of complaints on social media and negatively affected local tourist businesses.

The train street reopened in early 2023 for tourists. Visitors frequently gather at locations including the intersection at the North side near P.Trần Phú close to old quarter or South side near Ng.222 Đ.Lê Duẩn. Both sides are crowded with local cafes on sides indicating the train timetable. Tourists could also request train passing by time from cafe in advance. Usually there are around seven trains passing by from 7 am to 11 pm.

Hanoi Train Street has seen a growth in local businesses since it became popular with world tourists. As the number of visitors increased, many residents around the area turned their houses into businesses for selling drinks, food, and handmade souvenirs. Many small cafes populate the street, including Cafe Đường Tàu and Cafe Ga Đông Hương.

The railway line that runs along the north–south railway was built by the French in 1902 during their colonial rule of Vietnam. Hanoi Train Street was originally home to railway workers and their families since 1956. Houses around the area were built as collective housing for the employees. In recent years, the street attracted widespread recognition and eventually became a tourist attraction, with various cafes and small businesses along the street.

Tourists can safely watch the train from the outdoor seating areas of the local cafes; owners will typically move their stools closer to the wall and advise patrons to do so as the train approaches. Many will also post train times on chalk boards in their establishments.

== See also ==
- Maeklong Railway, a railway line in Thailand known to pass through a market.
