= Nec vi, nec clam, nec precario =

Legal term relating to permissions over land

Nec vi, nec clam, nec precario, is a Latin legal term meaning 'without force, without secrecy, without permission' or, in an alternative formulation offered, for instance, by Lord Hoffmann, 'not by force, nor stealth, nor the licence of the owner'. It is the principle by which rights may be built up over time, principally public rights of way in the United Kingdom. Specifically, if a path is used – openly, not against protests, but without permission of the landowner – for an extended period (20 years) then a permanent legal right to such use is usually established.

It is often referred to in the context of adverse possession and other land law issues. It is also relevant to the creation of easements whereby the law 'prescribes' an easement in the absence of a deed. In order for the law to do so the right of way or easement needs to have been enjoyed without force, without secrecy, and without permission for a period of time, usually 20 years.

== Use in Roman law ==
The phrase originates in Roman law, appearing in the form neque ui neque clam neque precario in line 18 of the Lex Agraria on the Tabula Bembina, a statute passed in 111 BC. The maxim appears to have been a widely recurring rider to the definition of property rights based on possessio (the form of interest in land arising from exercise of control, capable of maturing into ownership or dominium). It is referred to by Cicero on three occasions. In 72/71 BC, setting out some standard defences to a charge of obtaining property by 'force' or 'violence' (uis) in his speech on behalf of his client Marcus Tullius, he referred to the requirement that the dispossessed party's claim to possession not be based upon entry by force, stealth or licence ('cum ille possideret, quod possideret nec ui nec clam nec precario' - 'as long as the other party was in lawful possession and did not gain possession by force, stealth or licence'). In 69, in his defence of Aulus Caecina, Cicero similarly referred to the defence available to the man using force or violence (uis) to recover his property from an adverse possessor that the latter had himself entered by force, by stealth or on the recoveror's licence ('uincit tamen sponsionem si planum facit ab se illum aut ui aut clam aut precario possedisse' - 'yet he wins his argument if he can clearly show that the other obtained it from him by force, by stealth or by his licence'). And in 63, the year of his own consulship, Cicero attacked the agrarian reform bill introduced by Servilius Rullus for not excluding possession gained by force, stealth or owner's licence from its definition of lawful possessa: ('Suppose he ejected [the owner] by force, suppose he came into possession by stealth or by licence?' - 'etiamne si ui deiecit, si clam, si precario uenit in possessionem?').

The phrase appears to have been established long before the Lex Agraria of 111, and could be used facetiously or for comic effect beyond the legal profession, as is clear from a passage in the Eunuchus of Terence, a play usually dated to 161 BC. The character Chaerea enjoins the slave Parmeno to get the woman he lusts after for him by any means possible: 'Hanc tu mihi uel ui uel clam uel precario fac tradas; mea nihil refert, dum potiar modo' ('Make sure you deliver her to me, whether by force, by stealth, by licence - it makes no difference to me, as long as I get hold of her').
