= Kinrossie =

Village in Scotland

Coordinates: 56.47579°N 3.31980°W

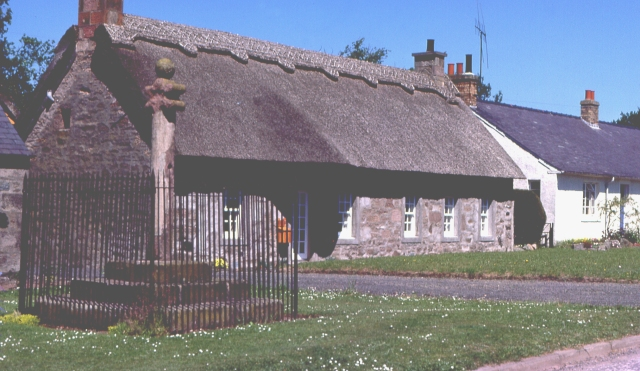
Kinrossie in 1977, including its Mercat cross

Kinrossie is a linear village in the Perth and Kinross area of Scotland. It is less than a mile south off the A94 road, 8 miles (13 kilometres) from Perth and 6 miles (10 kilometres) from Coupar Angus.
