= Mercat cross =

Scottish historic structure

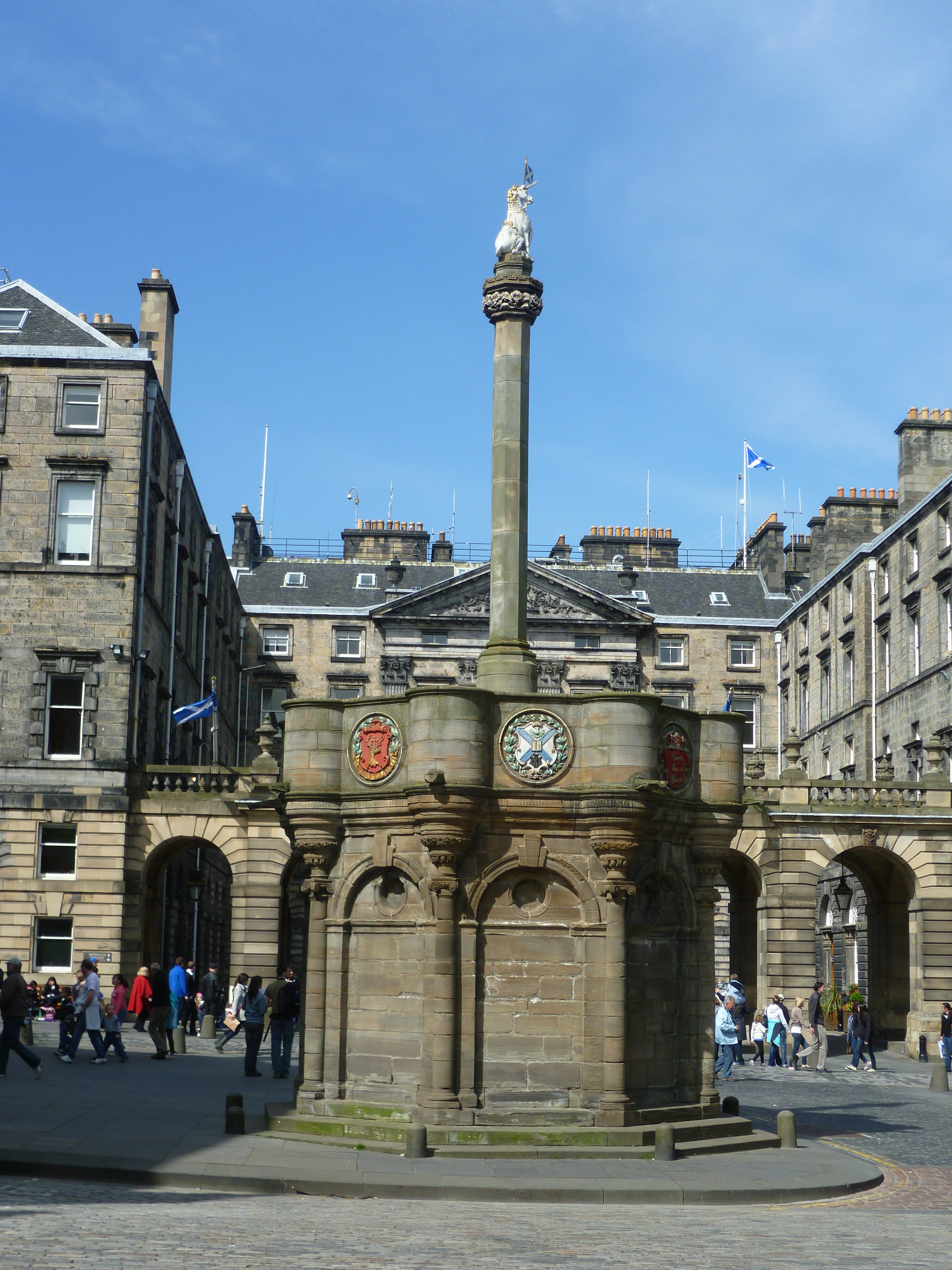
The Mercat Cross on Edinburgh's Royal Mile, an 1885 replacement of the original cross removed in 1756

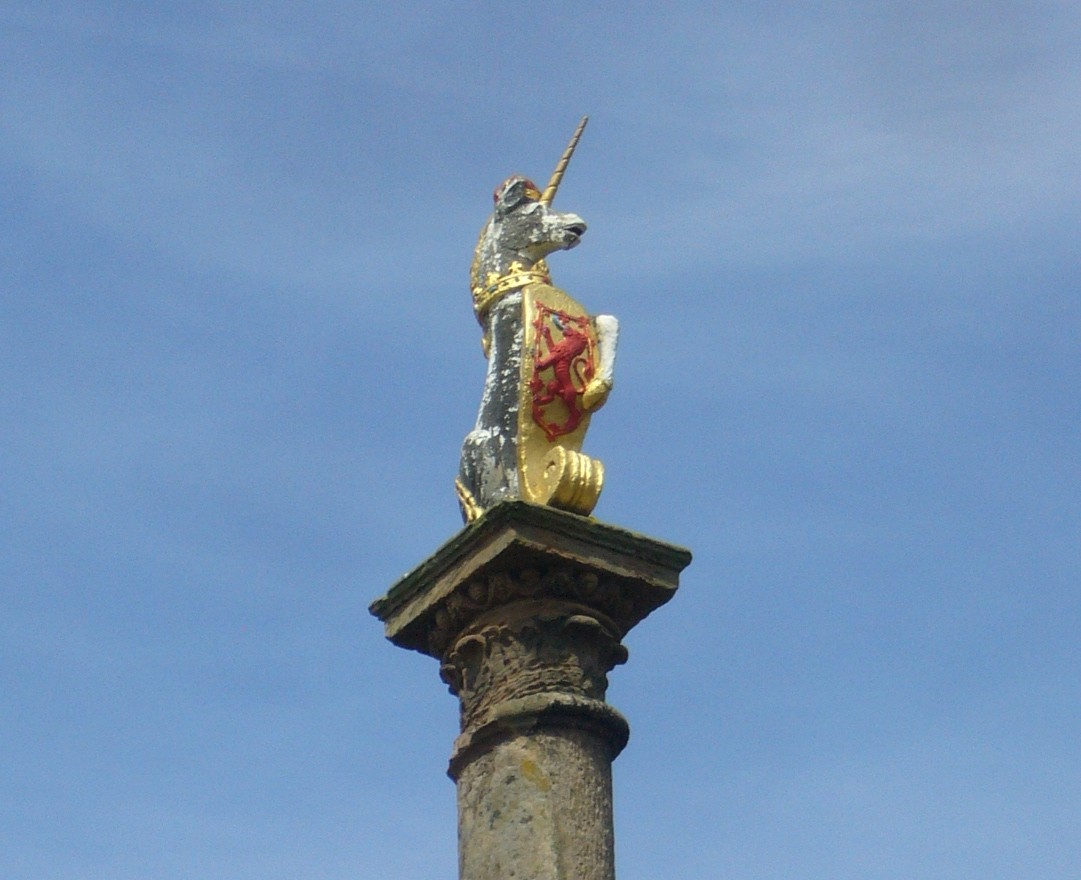
Royal unicorn finial on the cross at Prestonpans

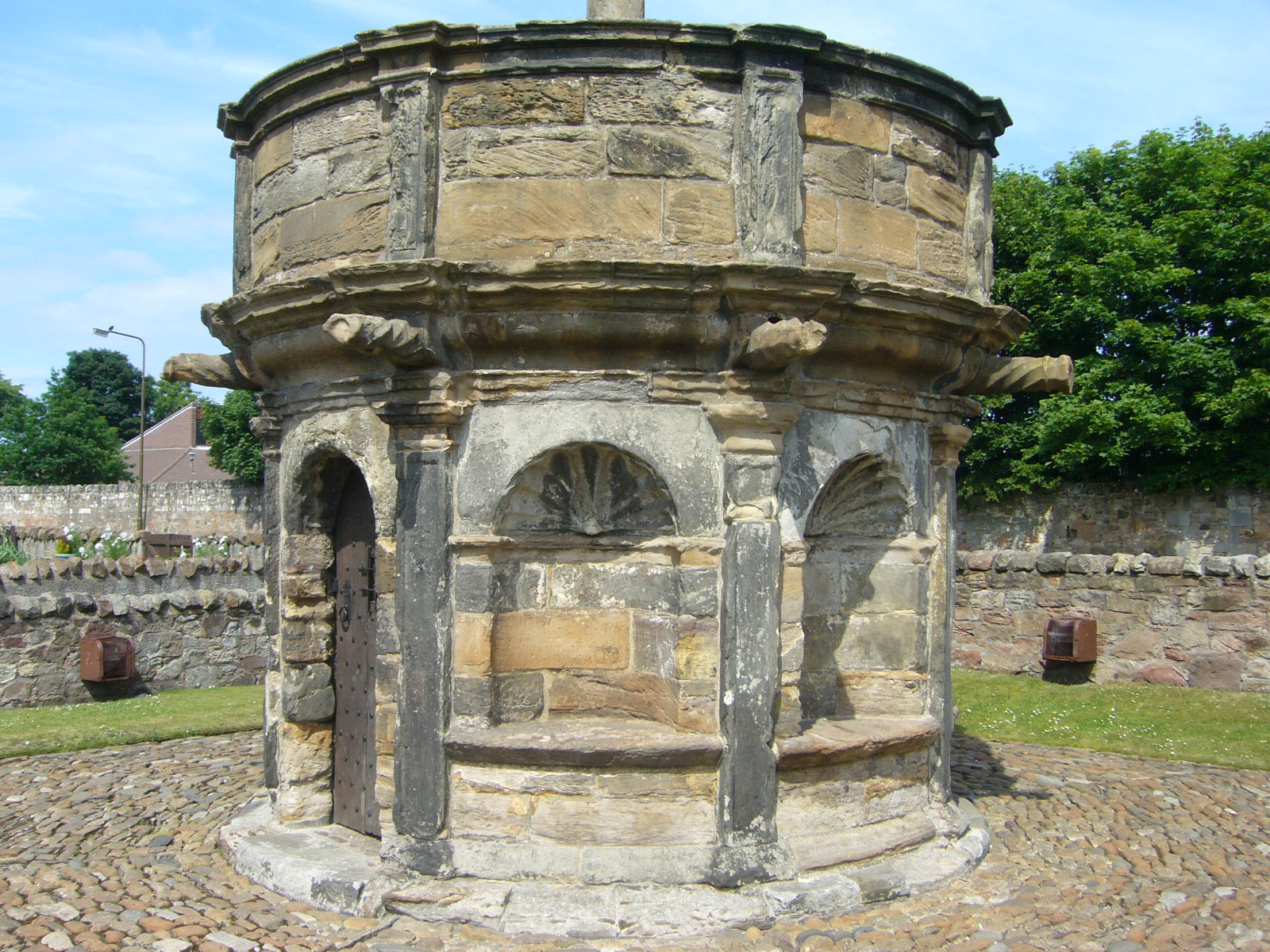
The cross-house at Prestonpans, built some time after 1617, when the right to hold a fair was granted

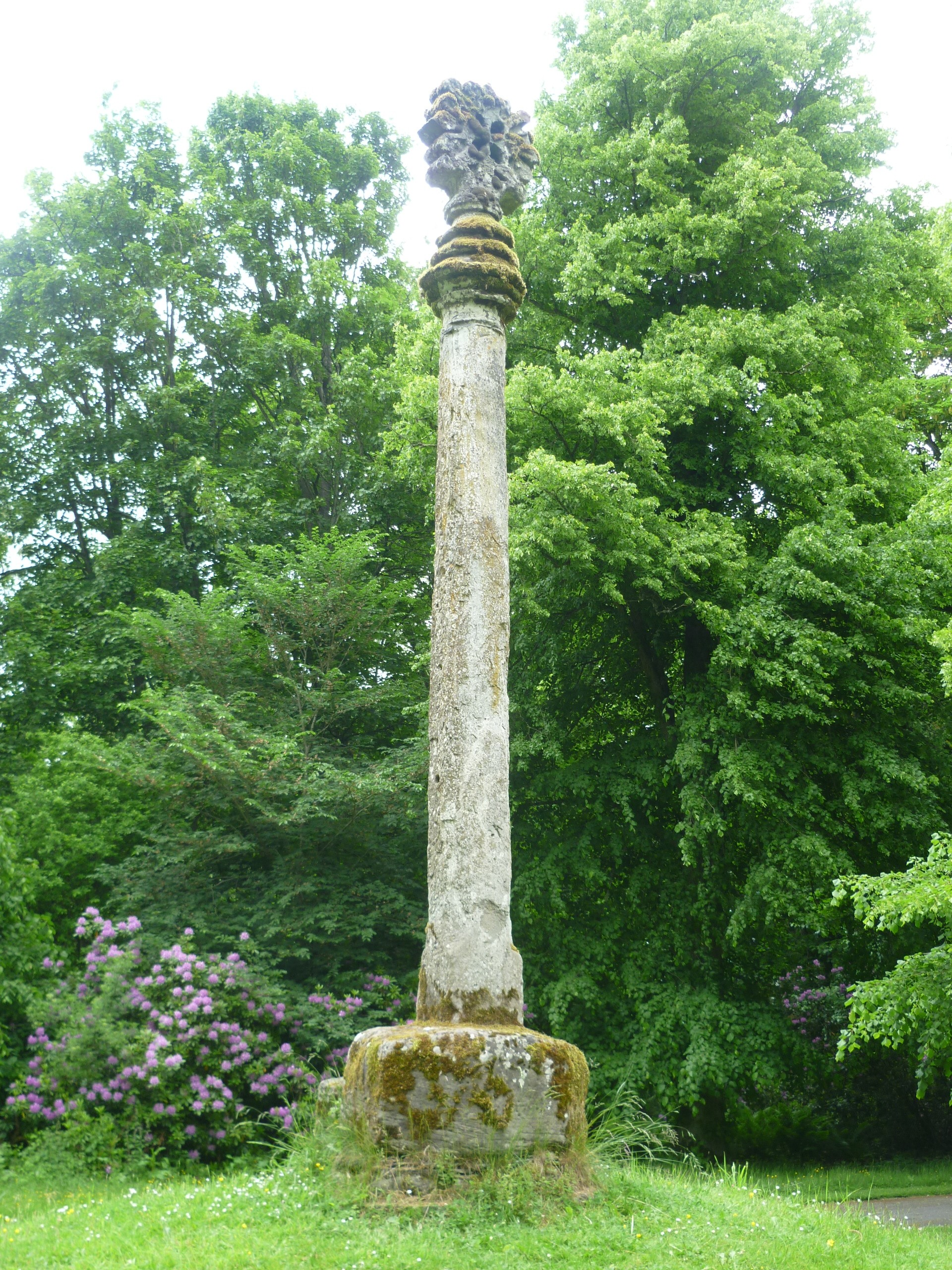
The cross of Old Scone, in the grounds of Scone Palace

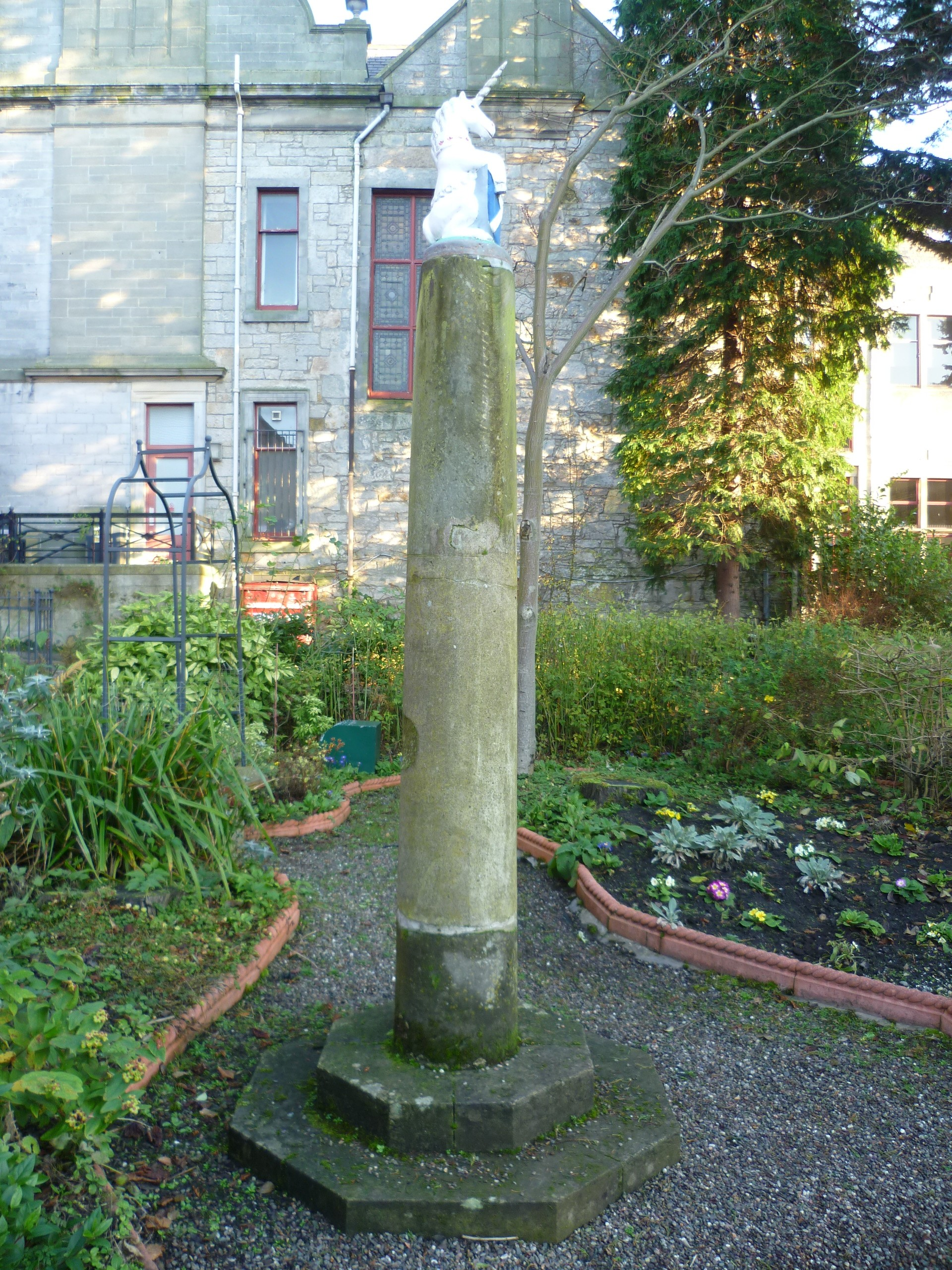
Original shaft of the Dunfermline Cross, in the garden of the Abbot House

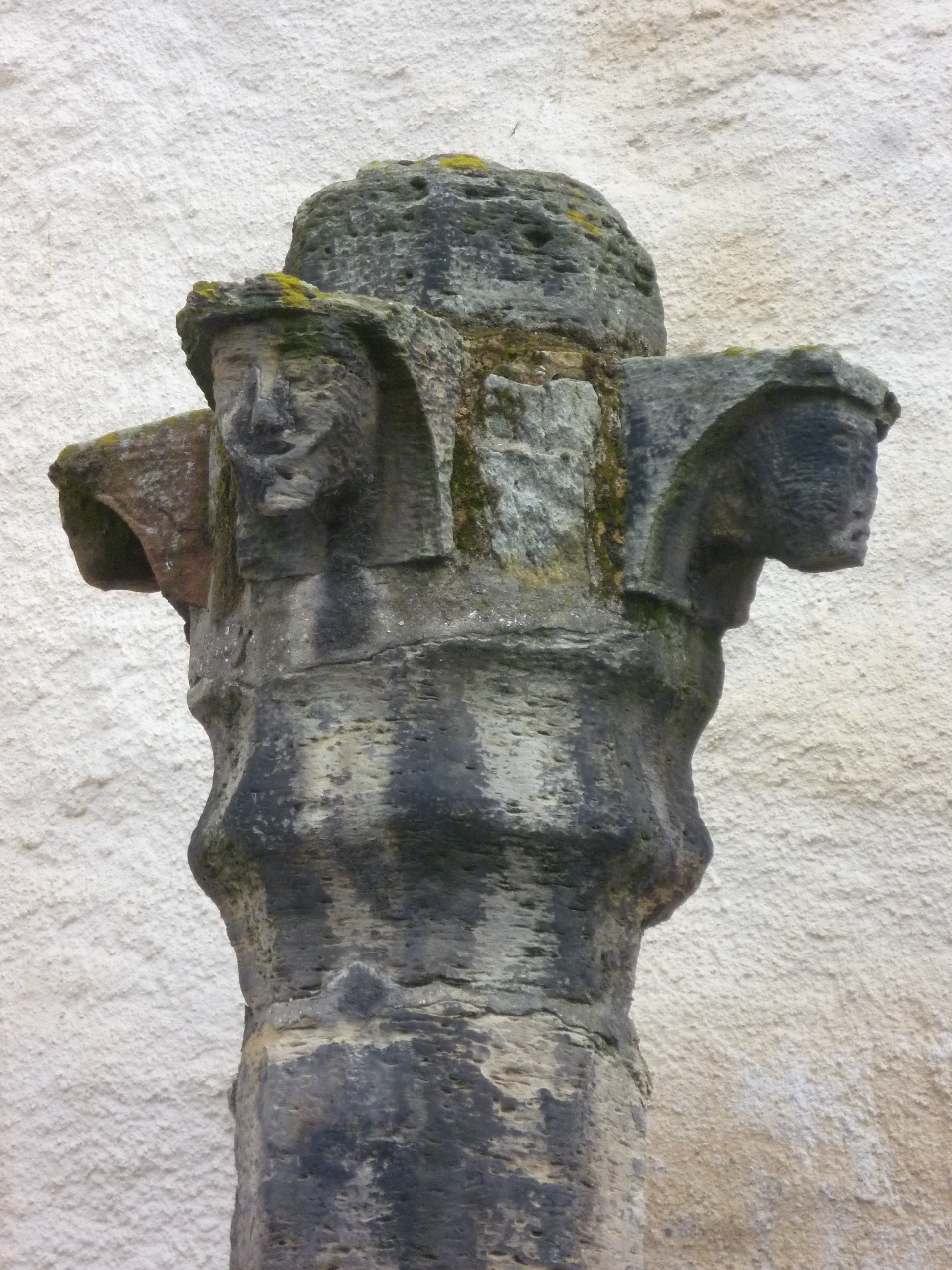
Dunbar's 16th-century cross is surmounted by three grotesque human heads, believed to have been taken from the town's old parish church.

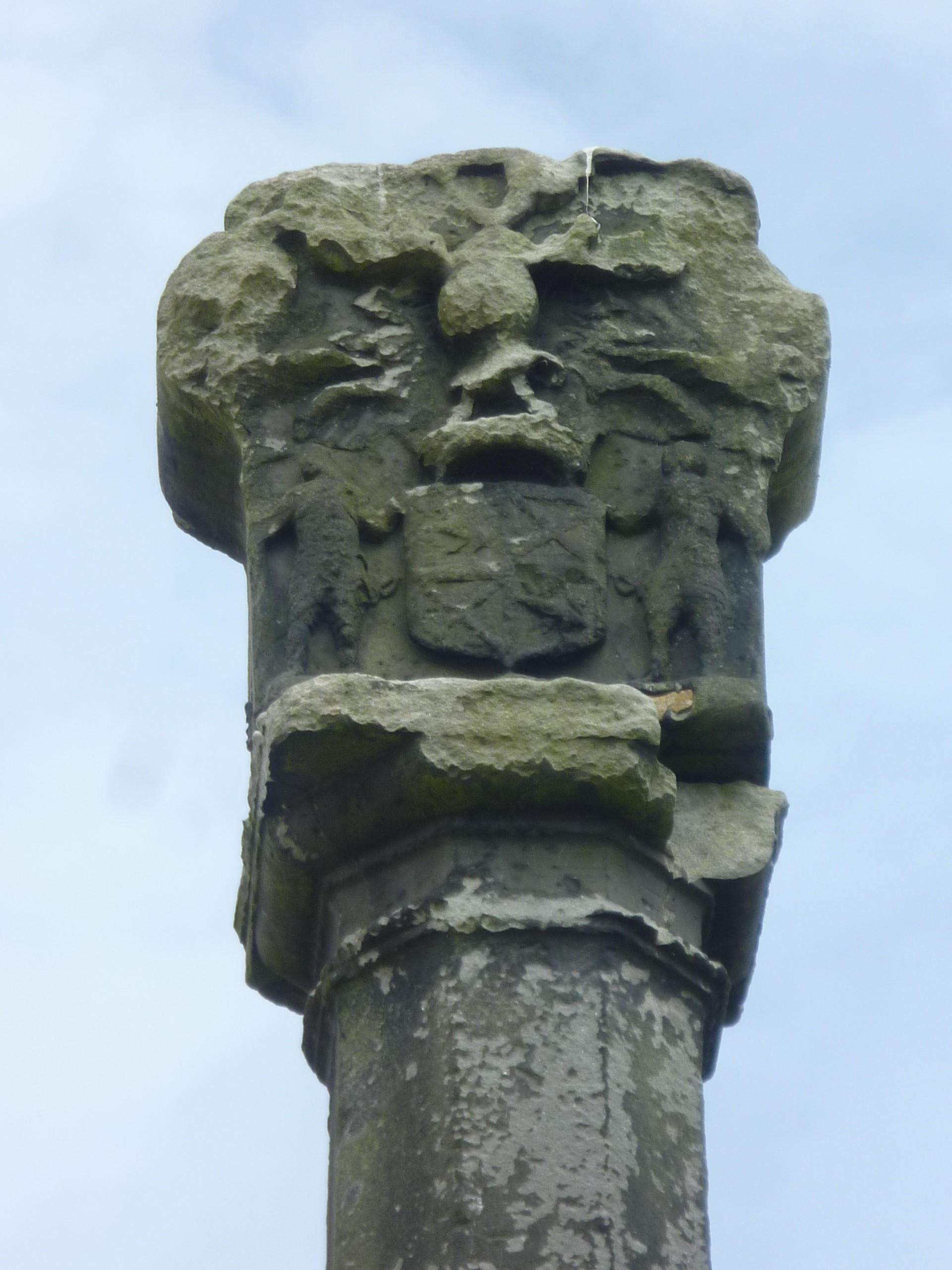
Arms of the Earl of Kincardine on the cross at Kincardine, Fife. The creation of the earldom in 1647 points to the cross being erected some time after that date.

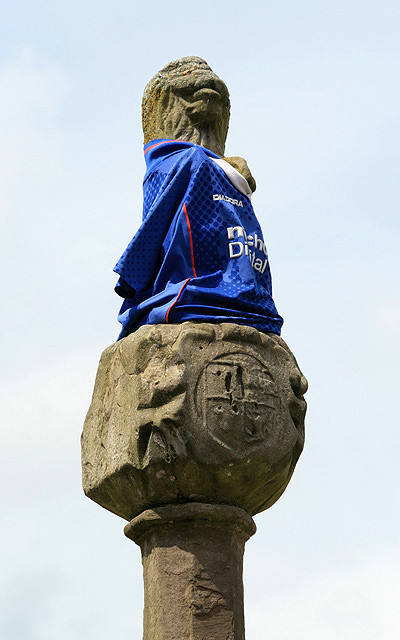
A Glasgow Rangers F.C. shirt adorns the mercat cross in Doune after the team won the Scottish Cup in 2009.

A mercat cross is a structure used in Scottish settlements to denote a market square. It historically indicated that the settlement had been granted the right to hold a regular market or fair by the monarch, a bishop or a baron; the cross therefore served as a symbol of authority, and was an indication of a burgh's relative prosperity. Some burghs had more than one cross, often named for the produce sold at their base.

There are around 126 known examples of mercat crosses in Scotland, with many examples dating from the sixteenth and seventeenth centuries. Scottish crosses are distinct from market crosses found elsewhere in the United Kingdom in form and iconography.

== History ==
The earliest documentary reference occurs in the reign of William the Lion (1165–1214), when it was decreed that "all merchandises sal be presentit at the mercat and mercat croce of burghis". Early town crosses may have continued the tradition of church crosses used to mark consecrated land or sanctuary boundaries, and functioned similarly to early ecclesiastical crosses, from before the building of stone churches, in marking a communal gathering place. They are thought to have been originally pillars of wood, possibly placed on stone bases, changing to stone pillars in later centuries. Some, as at Inverkeithing, incorporate sundials (the pillar of each cross itself acts as a primitive sundial).

The cross was the place around which market stalls would be arranged, and where 'merchants' (Scots for shopkeepers as well as wholesale traders) would gather to discuss business. It was also the spot where state and civic proclamations would be publicly read by the "bellman" (town crier). For example, in 1682 a town guild in Stirling was accorded the privilege of making a proclamation, to be "intimat at the Mercat Croce that no person pretend ignorance." To this day, royal proclamations are still ceremonially read in public at the Mercat Cross in Edinburgh, including the calling of a general election and succession of a new monarch.

The cross was also the communal focal point of public events such as civic ceremonials, official rejoicings, and public shamings and punishments, including executions. Some crosses still incorporate the iron staples to which jougs and branks were once attached. Communal gatherings still take place at crosses, as at Galashiels on "Braw Lads Day" or Peebles at the start of the Beltane Festival. Crosses are often the place to mark the start or end of Common Ridings as at Musselburgh or events such as the Stonehaven fireball ceremony.

== Descriptions ==
Despite the name, the typical mercat cross is not usually cruciform, or at least has not been since the iconoclasm of the Scottish Reformation. The cross atop the shaft may have been replaced with a small statue, such as a royal unicorn or lion, symbols of the Scottish monarchy, or a carved stone displaying the arms of the royal burgh, or, in the cases of ecclesiastical burghs or burghs of barony, the bishop's or feudal superior's coat-of-arms. These are often painted. Another finial commonly seen is a stone ball as at Clackmannan and Newton Stewart. The shaft is usually surmounted by a plain or decorated capital. A variety of decorative designs are employed, including foliage, emblems like thistles and roses, armorial shields, and mouldings of the egg-and-dart type.

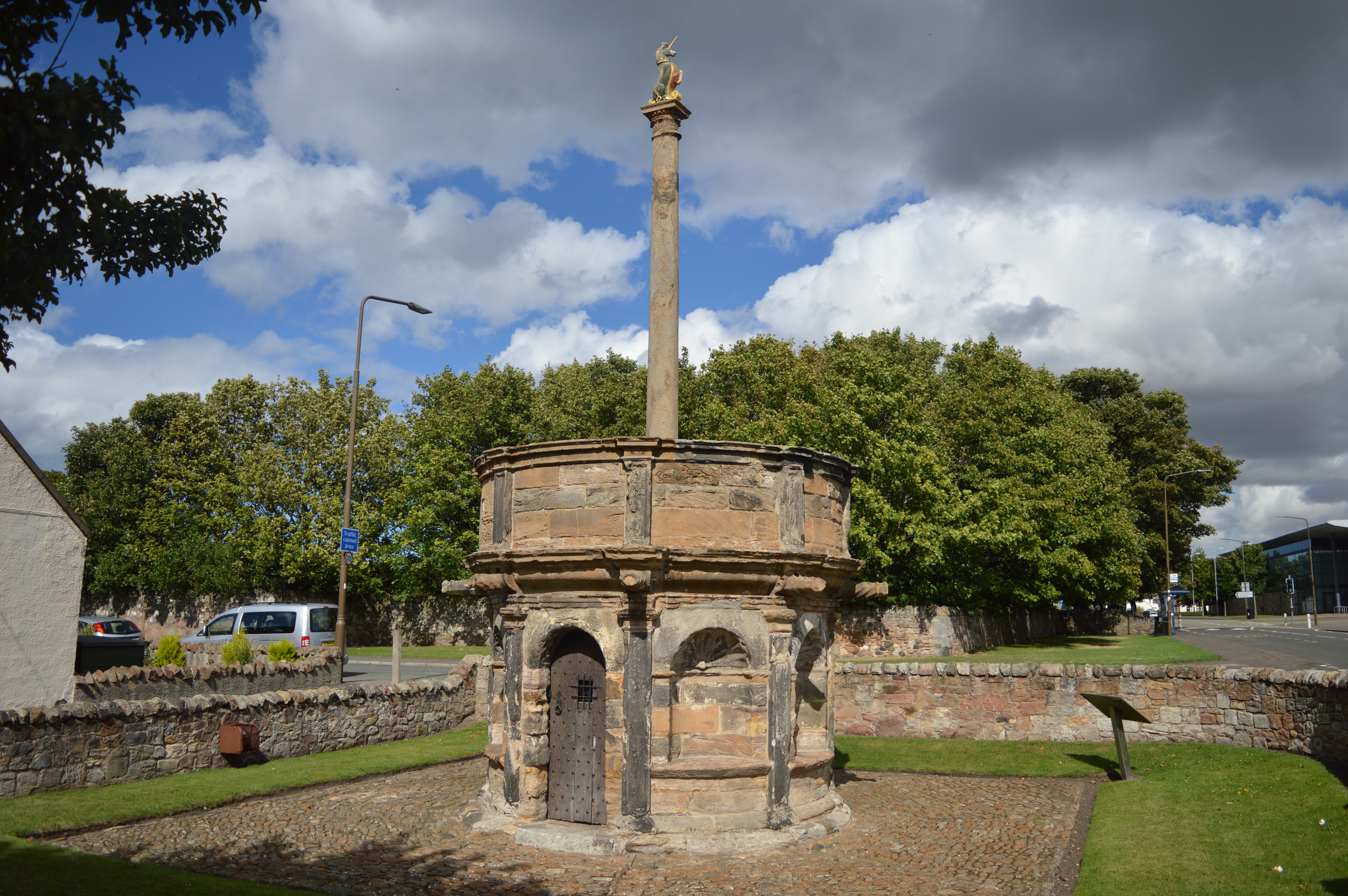
Preston Cross, in Prestonpans

Five crosses: at Edinburgh, Dundee, Perth, Aberdeen and Preston (modern Prestonpans) were supported by a drum-shaped understructure, known as a cross-house, with a platform reached by internal steps or ladder. In the case of Aberdeen's late 17th-century cross the platform is supported by a series of open semi-circular arcades. The Preston Cross, built in the early 17th century, is the only one of the type still existing on its original site. This traditional design has been replicated approximately with added Scots baronial elements in Victorian reconstructions at Edinburgh and Perth. A plainer understructure faintly echoing the design was adopted for Glasgow's cross when a replacement was erected on or near the site of the original in 1921; and simpler versions exist elsewhere, as at Elgin and Selkirk. Most crosses, however, stand on stepped, often octagonal stone bases and are of an average height of between 9 and 13 feet. In some cases, as at Musselburgh (see gallery image) and Kirkcudbright, the pillar is secured within or stands upon a solid stone structure.

Some mercat crosses of today are replicas from the Victorian period, as at Dunfermline and Scone, though they often incorporate one or more original elements, particularly the shaft or a section thereof. Some crosses, as at Linlithgow and St Andrews, were replaced with public drinking fountains substituting for older, demolished crosses, and some were adapted as war memorials after the Great War of 1914–1918. A war memorial may incorporate a part of the original cross, as at Renfrew or Bowden, or have been built deliberately in the style of a mercat cross, as at Lauder and Moffat. The war memorials at Abernethy, North Berwick and Portree also closely resemble mercat crosses and are known as such. The last, of course, lies geographically well outside the historic area of Scottish Lowland burghs. Another example of what might be termed an imitation cross is the war memorial at Dalmeny. It provides the village with a customary focal point and gives the impression that it is much older than its 19th-century origin, but is not indicative of a historical market.

Taken for granted as a normal part of the street scene, crosses have in the main been poorly documented in the past regarding their dates of erection, relocation and remodelling, and they often suffer from neglect in the present. Many no longer stand in their original position. Some, such as Forfar's, and Queensferry's have disappeared, and some, such as Cupar's and Banff's, have been moved to a location outside the burgh but later retrieved and re-erected.

Scottish emigrants to countries such as Canada and especially Australia took the idea of the mercat cross with them, and several cities in the New World have or once had them in the town centre.

== List of places with mercat crosses ==
- New Aberdeen
- Aberlady
- Abernethy
- Airth
- Alloa
- Alyth
- Anstruther
- Banff
- Beauly
- Biggar
- Brechin
- Burntisland
- Callander
- Campbeltown
- Canongate
- Carnwath
- Clackmannan
- Cockburnspath
- Coldingham
- Coupar Angus
- Crail
- Crieff
- Cullen
- Culross
- Cumnock
- Cupar
- Dingwall
- Dornoch
- Doune
- Duffus
- Dumfries
- Dunbar
- Dundee
- Dunfermline
- Dunkeld
- Duns
- Edinburgh
- Elgin
- Errol
- Falkirk
- Fettercairn
- Forres
- Fortrose
- Fraserburgh
- Galashiels
- Gifford
- Glamis
- Glasgow
- Haddington
- Houston
- Inveraray
- Inverbervie
- Inverkeithing
- Inverness
- Irvine
- Jedburgh
- Kilmarnock
- Kilmaurs
- Kilwinning
- Kincardine
- Kinross
- Kinrossie
- Kirkcudbright
- Kirkwall
- Langholm
- Lerwick
- Leven
- Linlithgow
- Lochmaben
- Longforgan
- Lossiemouth
- Luss
- Macduff
- Maybole
- Meikleour
- Melrose
- Milton
- Moniaive
- Montrose
- Musselburgh
- Nairn
- Newton Stewart
- North Berwick
- Oban
- Oldhamstock
- Old Aberdeen
- Old Rayne
- Old Scone
- Ormiston
- Peebles
- Perth
- Pittenweem
- Portree
- Prestonpans
- Prestwick
- Renfrew
- Rutherglen
- St Andrews
- Sanquhar
- Scone
- Selkirk
- Stirling
- Stonehaven
- Swinton
- Tain
- Thornhill
- Turriff
- Whithorn
- Wick
- Wigtown

== Gallery ==
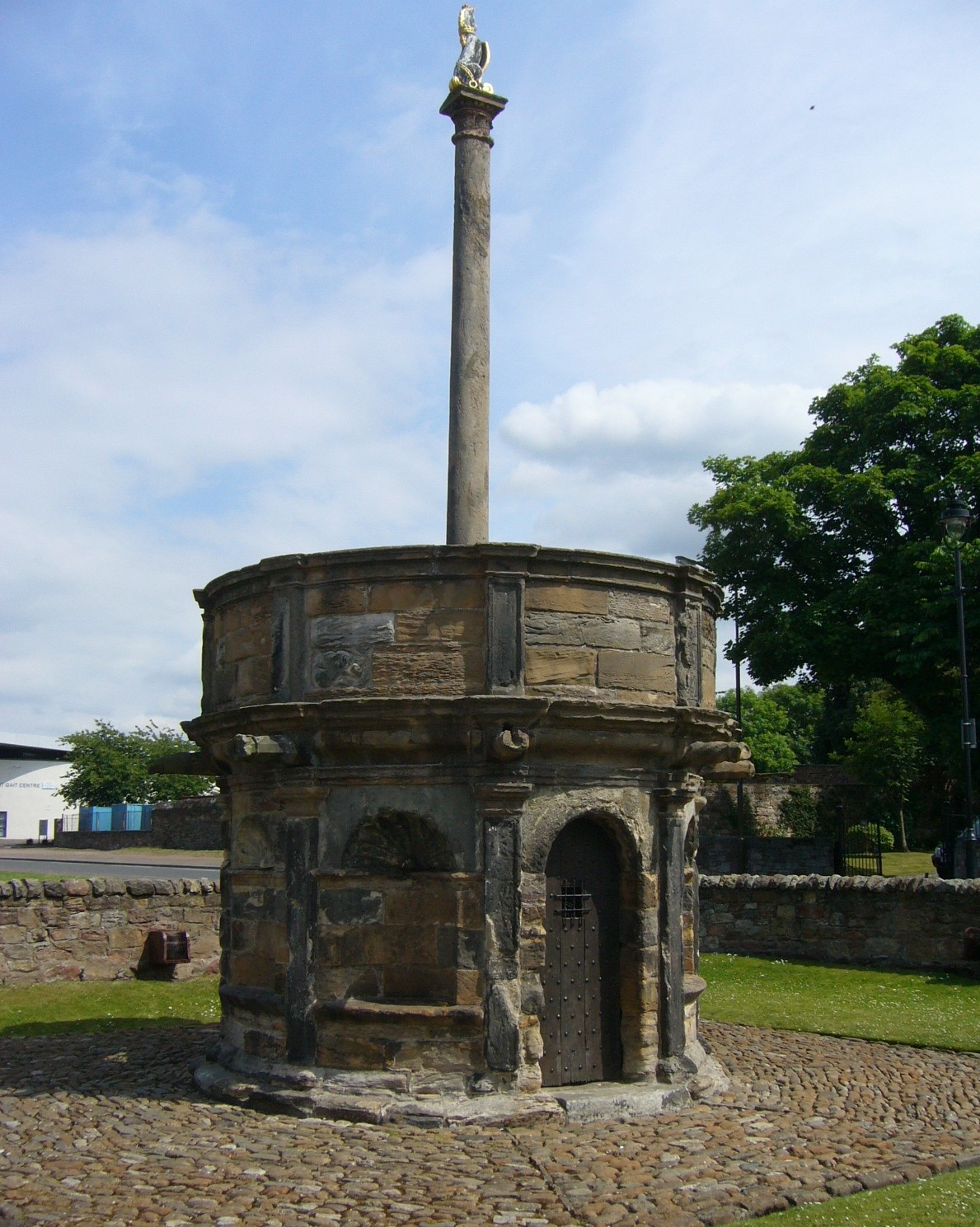
One of the oldest surviving crosses still on its original site at Prestonpans, East Lothian

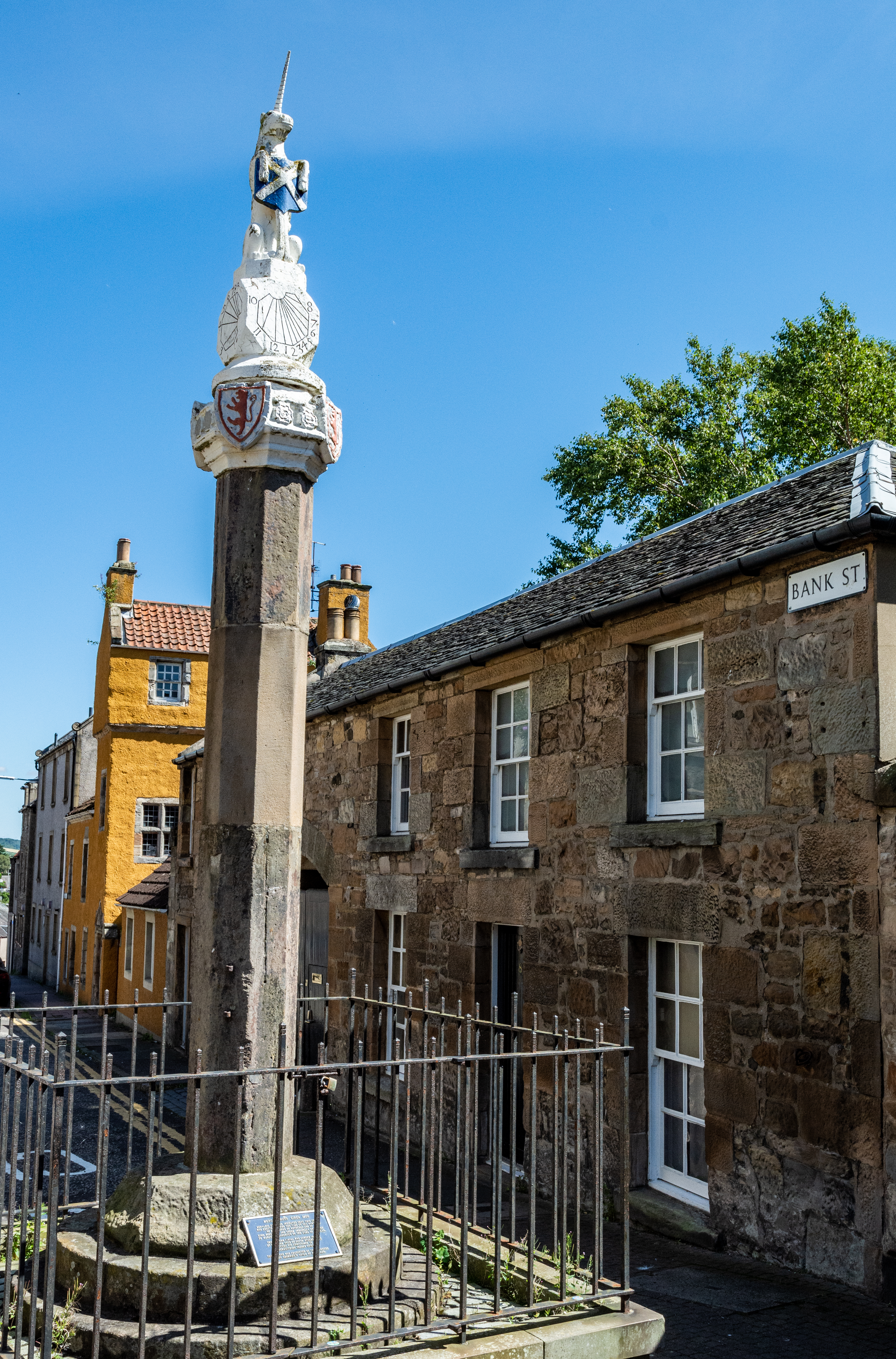
One of the finest examples of a mercat cross, at Inverkeithing, Fife

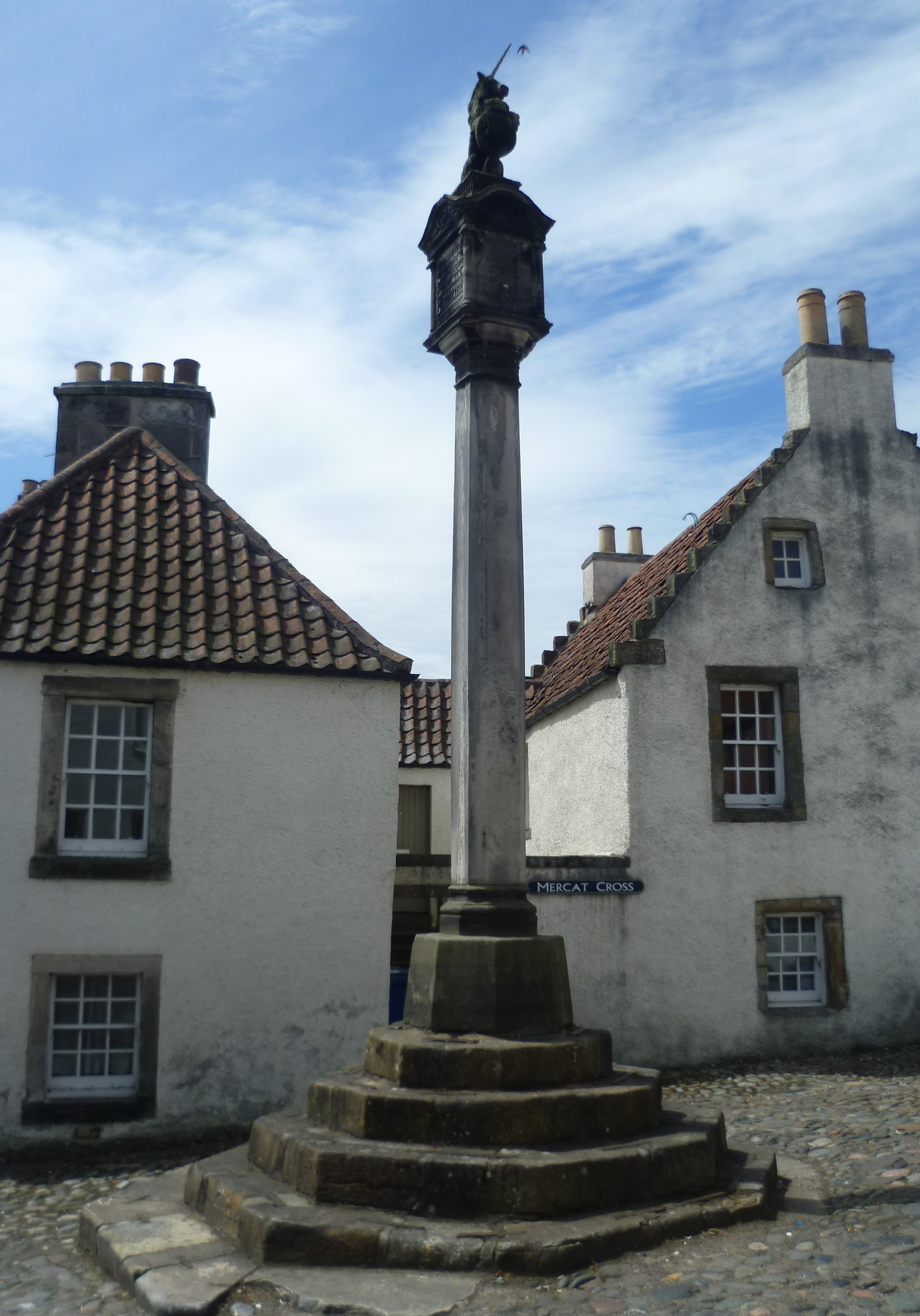
The cross in the small burgh of Culross, Fife

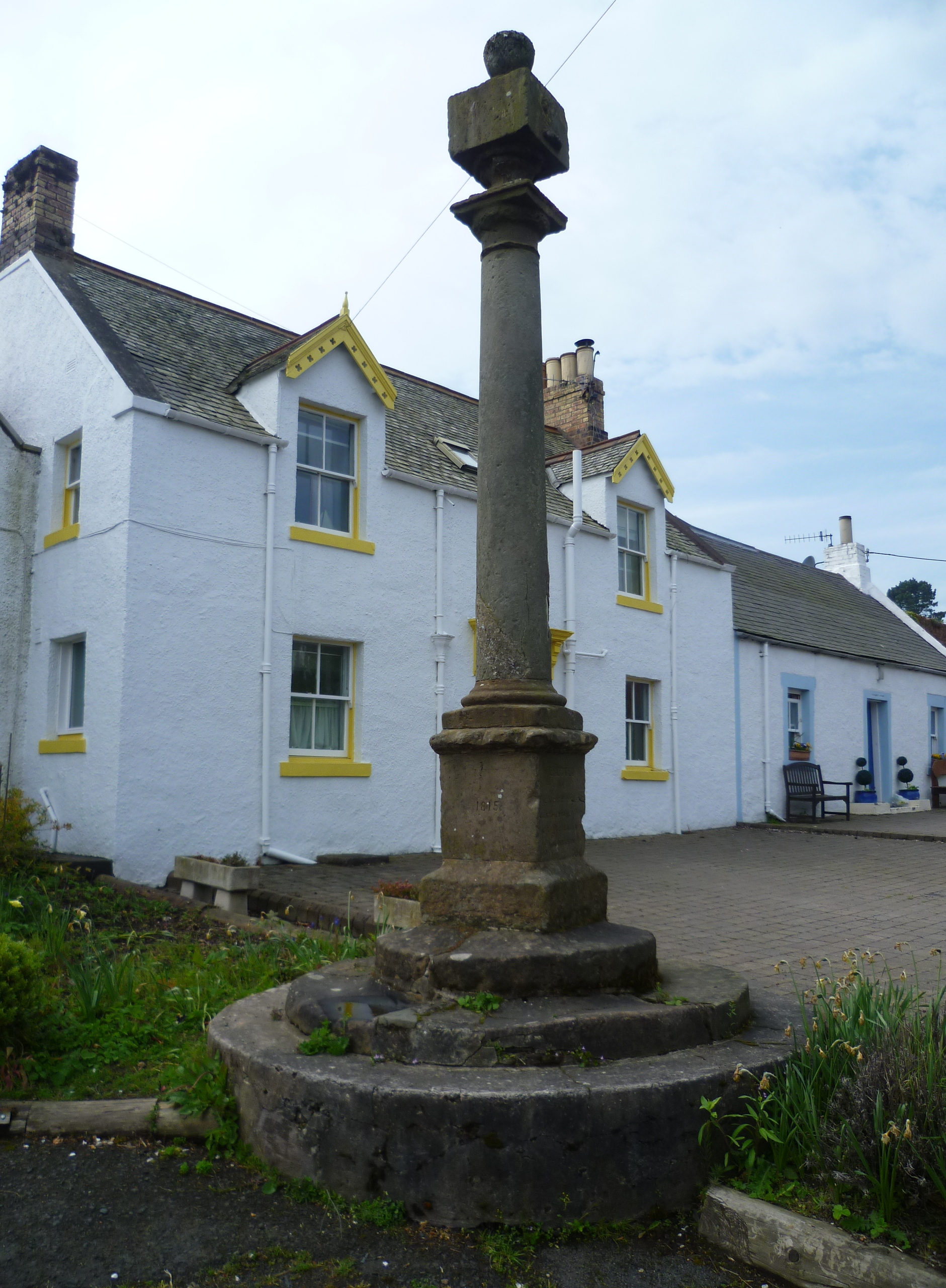
The cross at Coldingham, Berwickshire

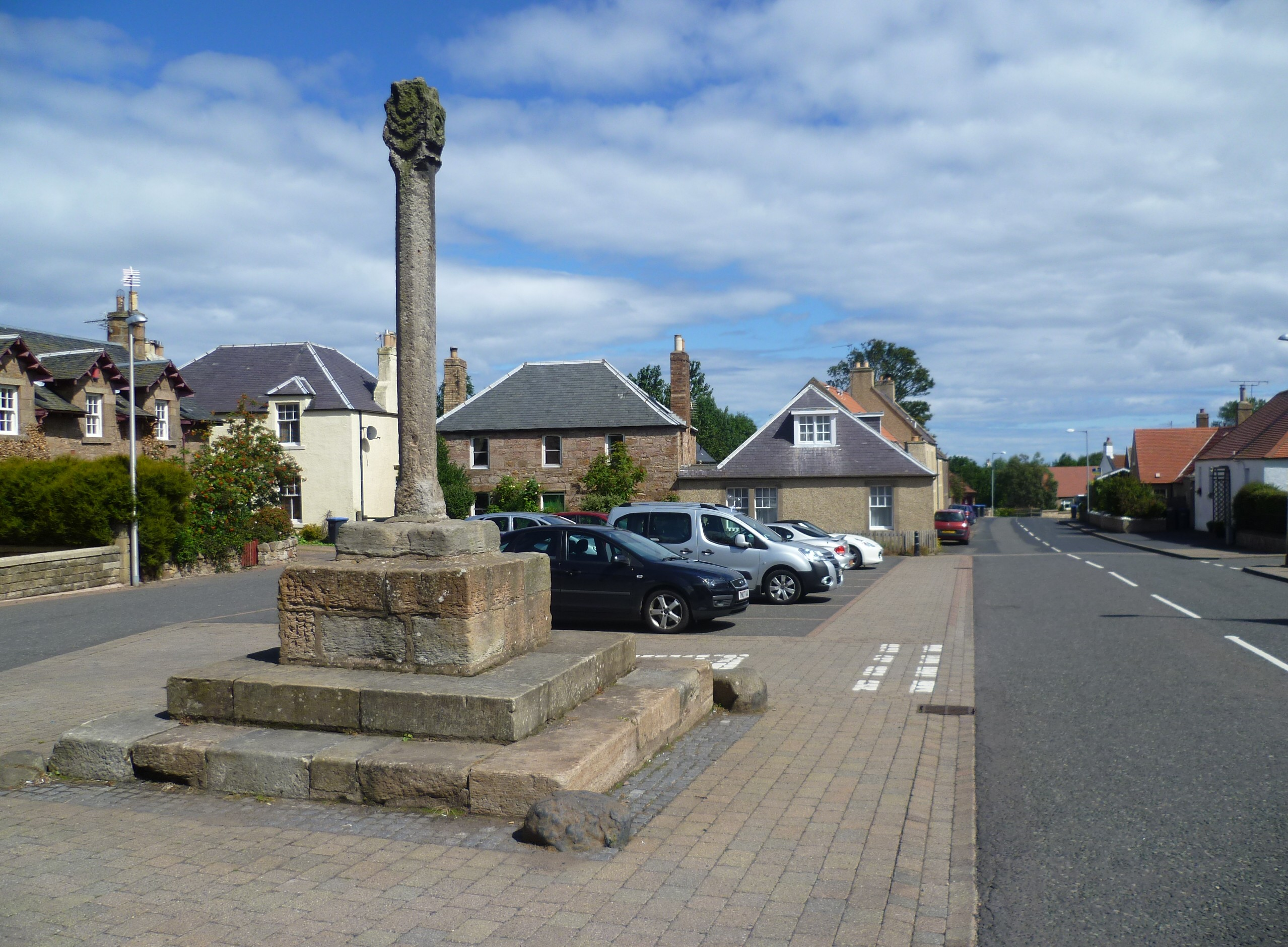
The cross at Cockburnspath, Berwickshire

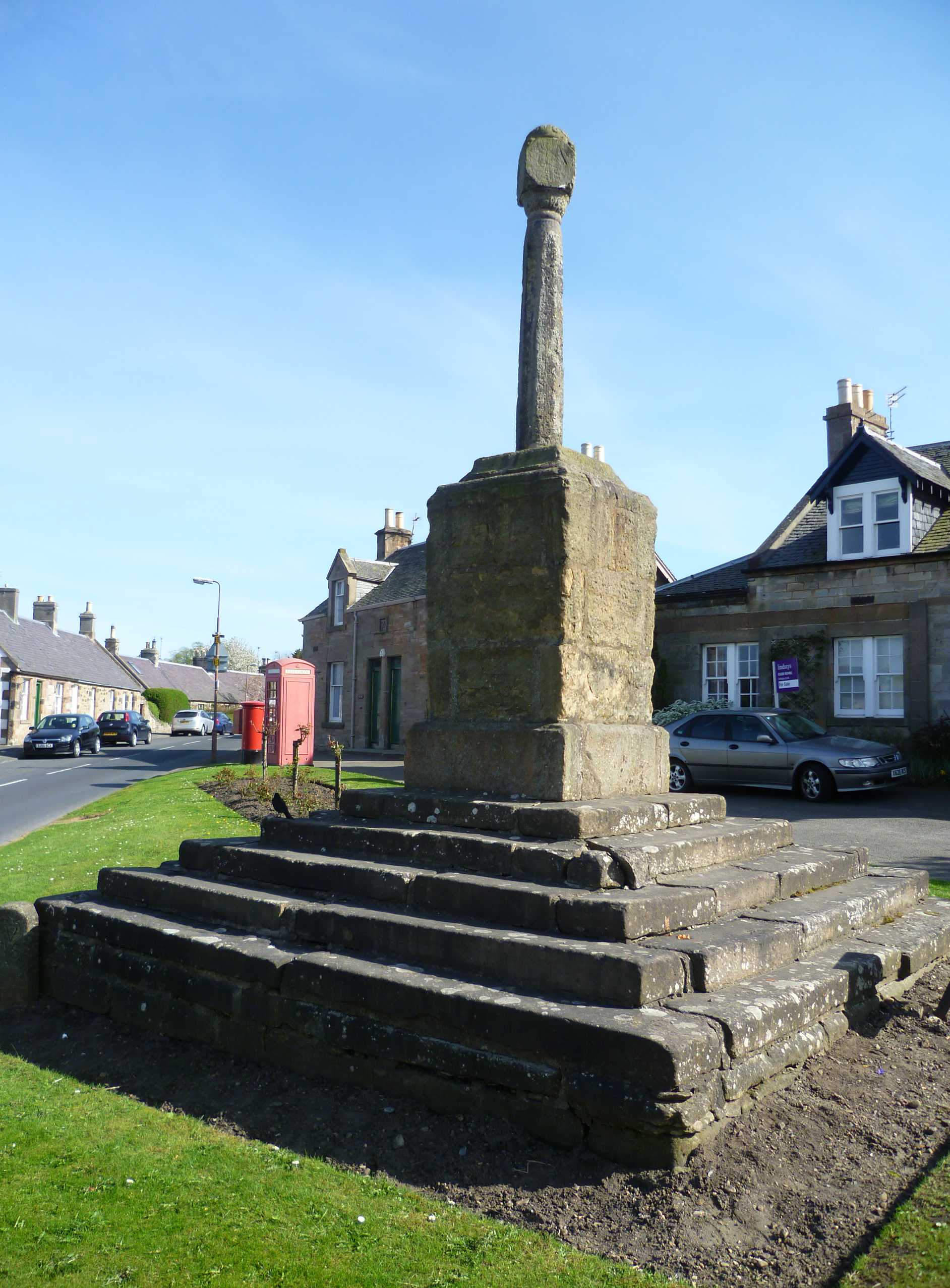
The cross at Pencaitland, East Lothian

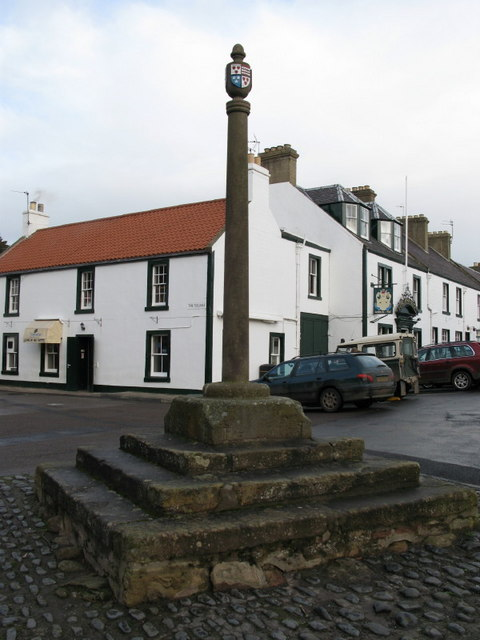
The cross at Gifford, East Lothian

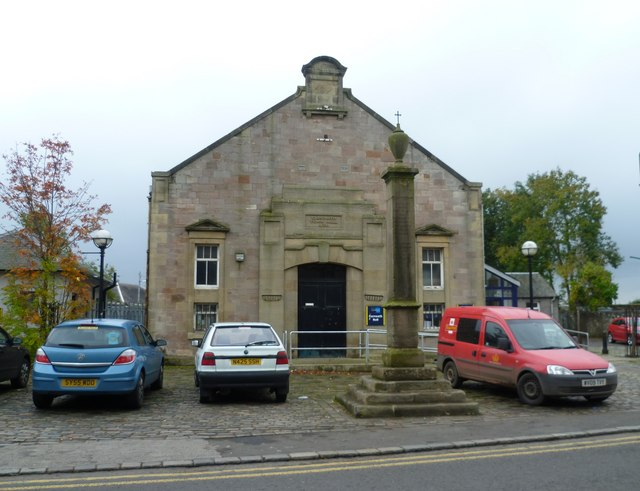
The cross at Carnwath, Lanarkshire, with inscribed distances to other burghs

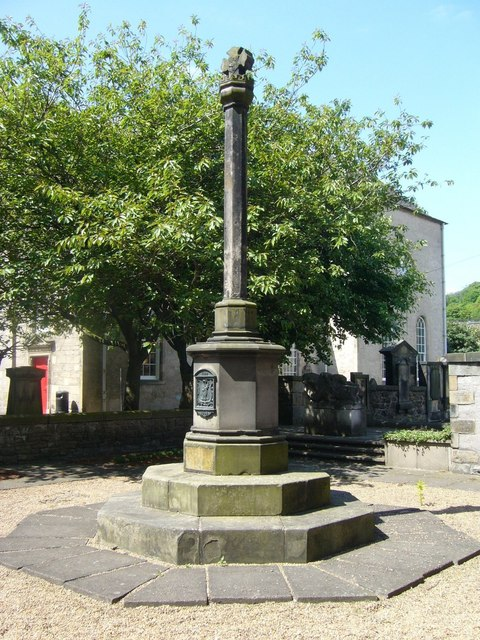
The Canongate Cross, in Edinburgh, topped by a cross symbolising the former ecclesiastical burgh

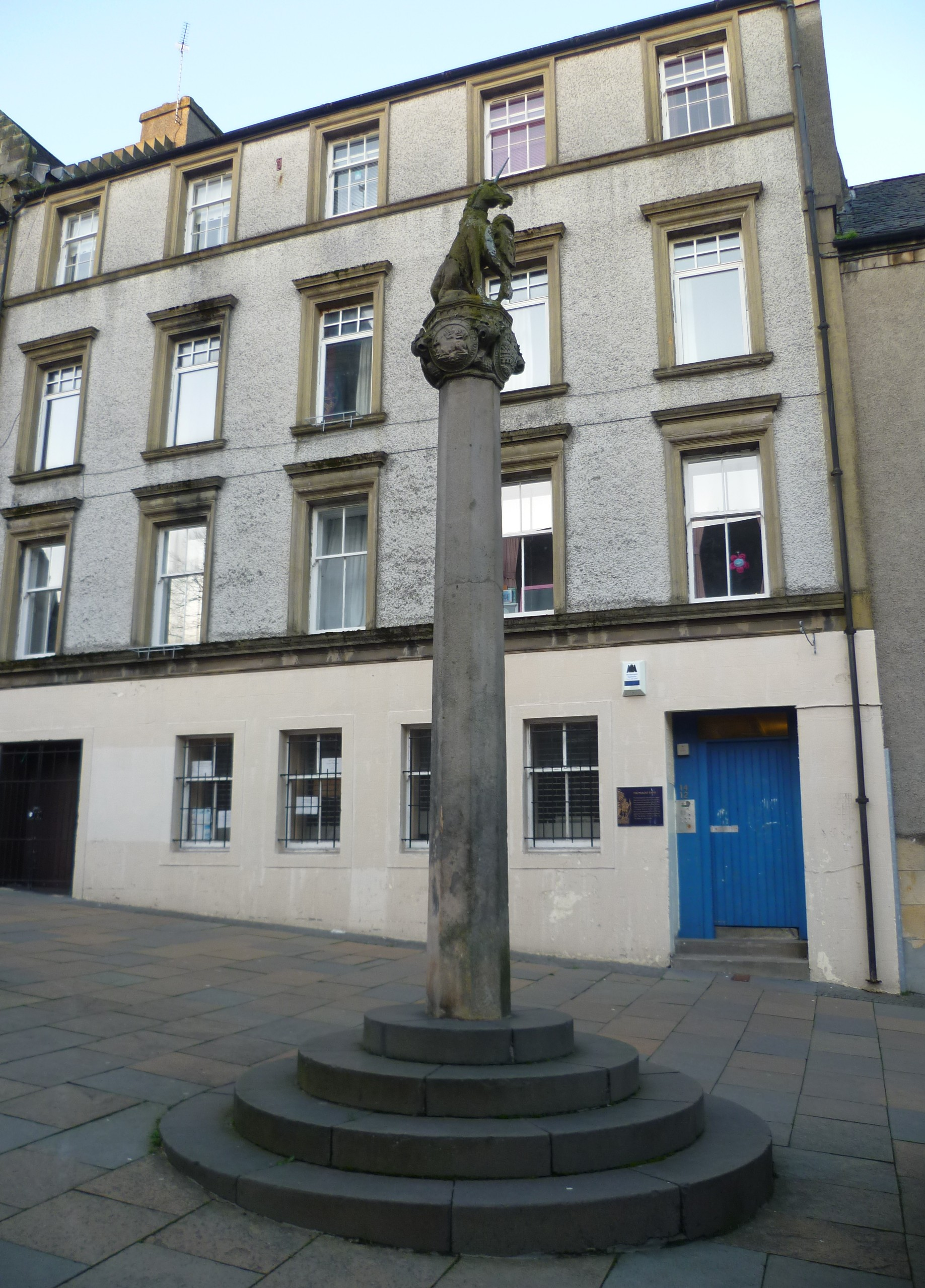
The cross at Stirling, topped by a unicorn

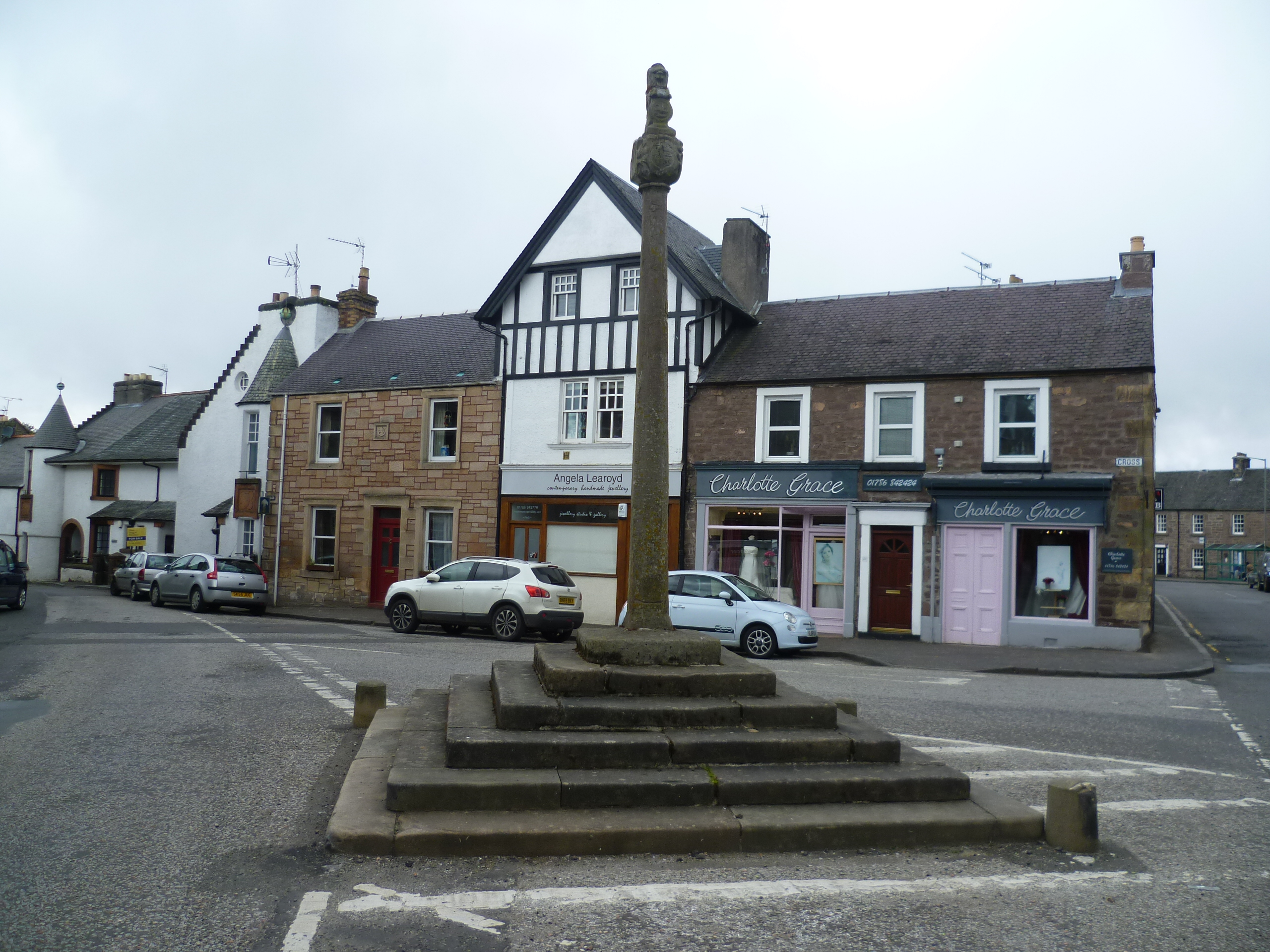
The cross at Doune, near Stirling, topped by a lion

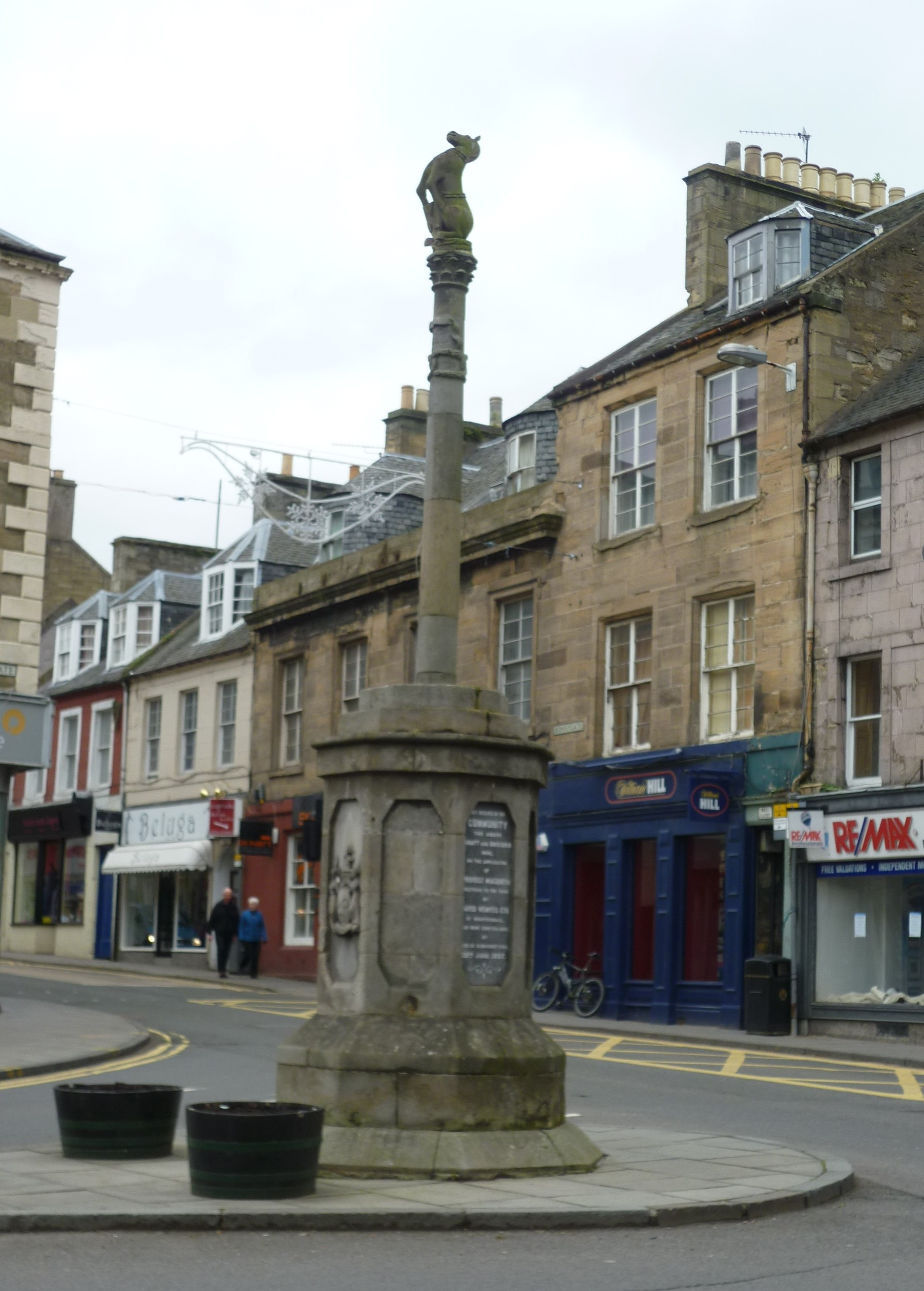
The cross at Cupar, Fife

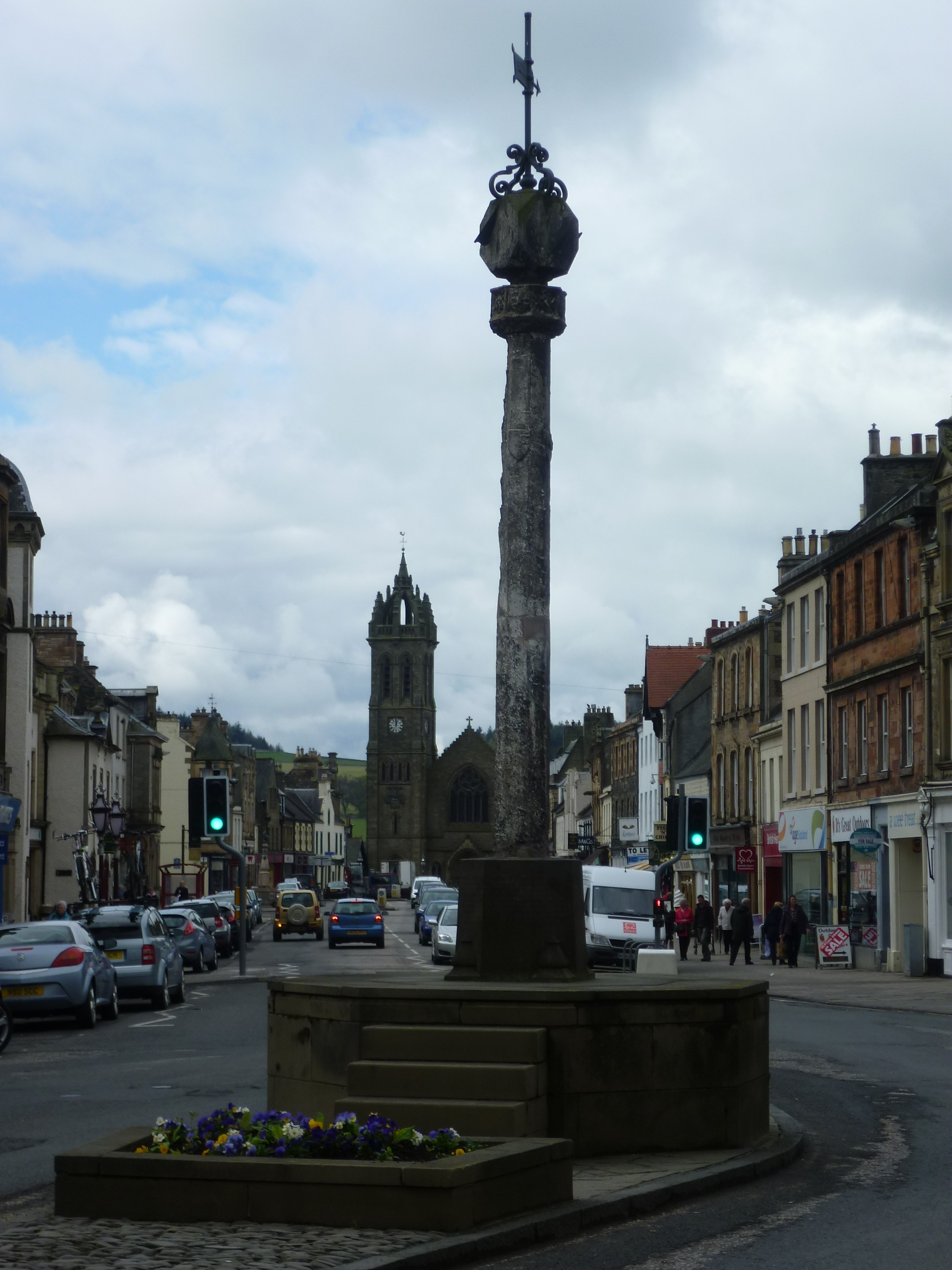
The cross at Peebles, in the Scottish Borders

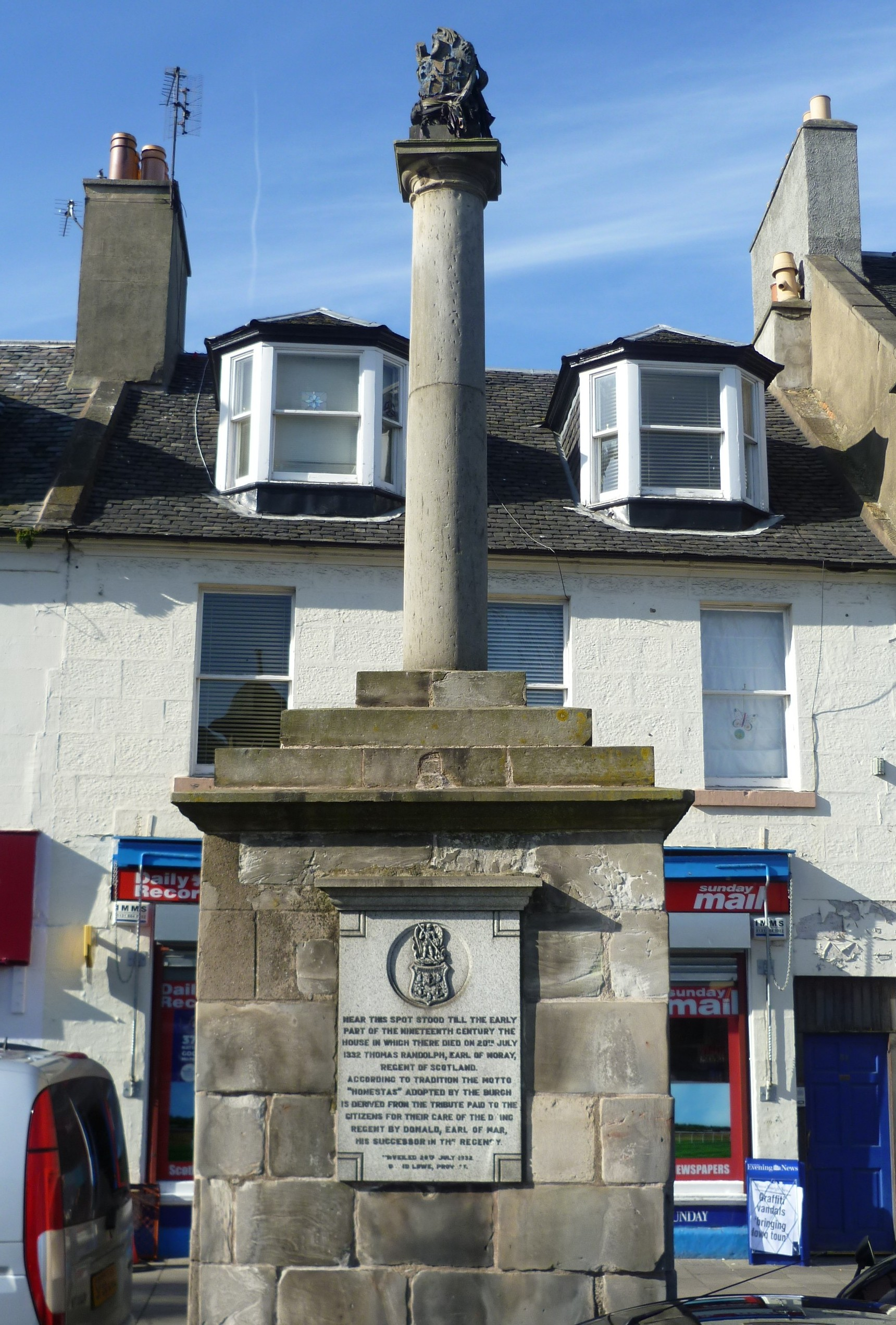
The cross at Musselburgh, East Lothian, topped by the burgh arms

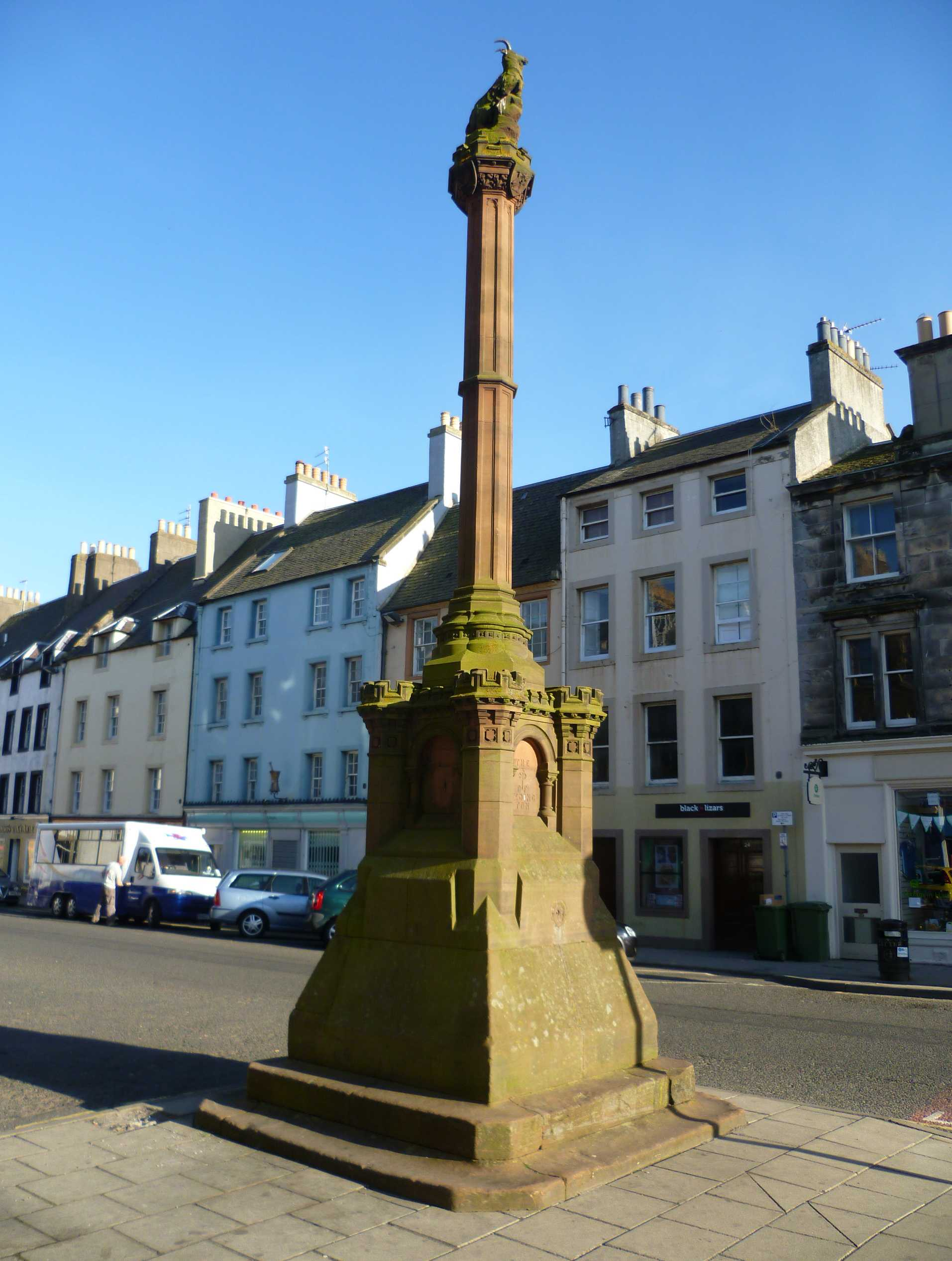
The cross at Haddington, East Lothian, topped by the town's symbol, a goat

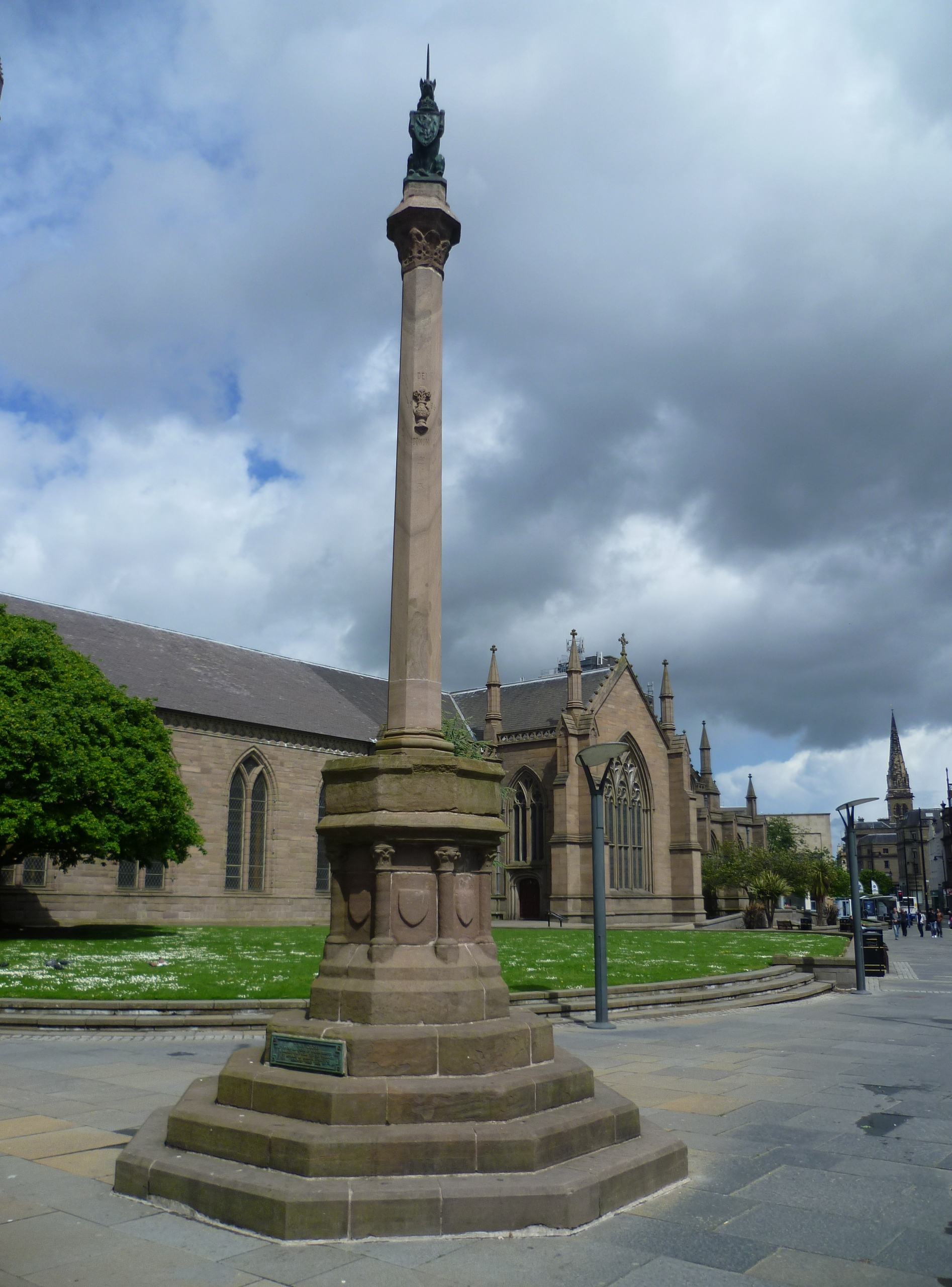
The cross at Dundee, re-erected at a new location in 1874 without its original octagonal cross-house

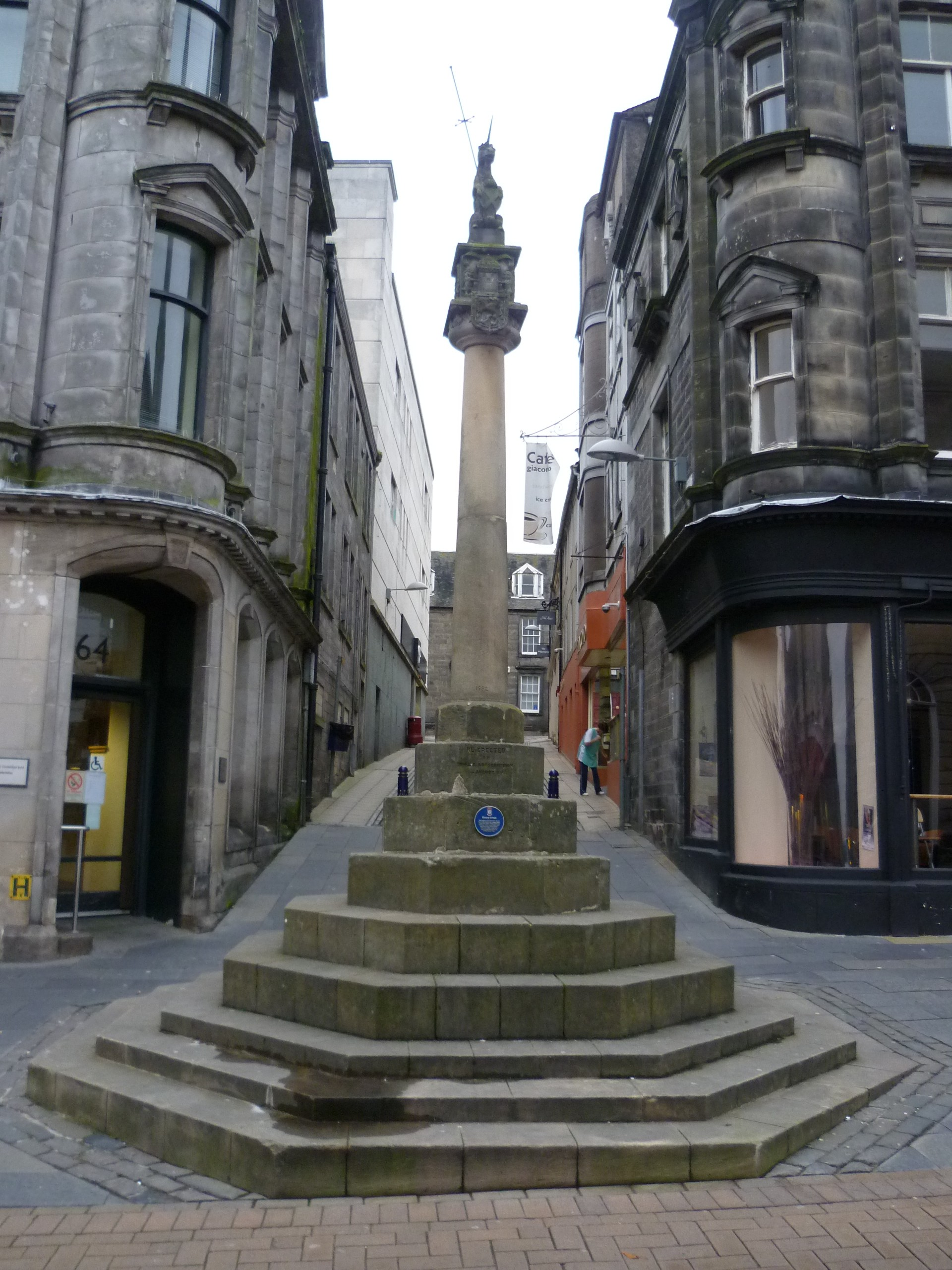
The cross at Dunfermline, Fife

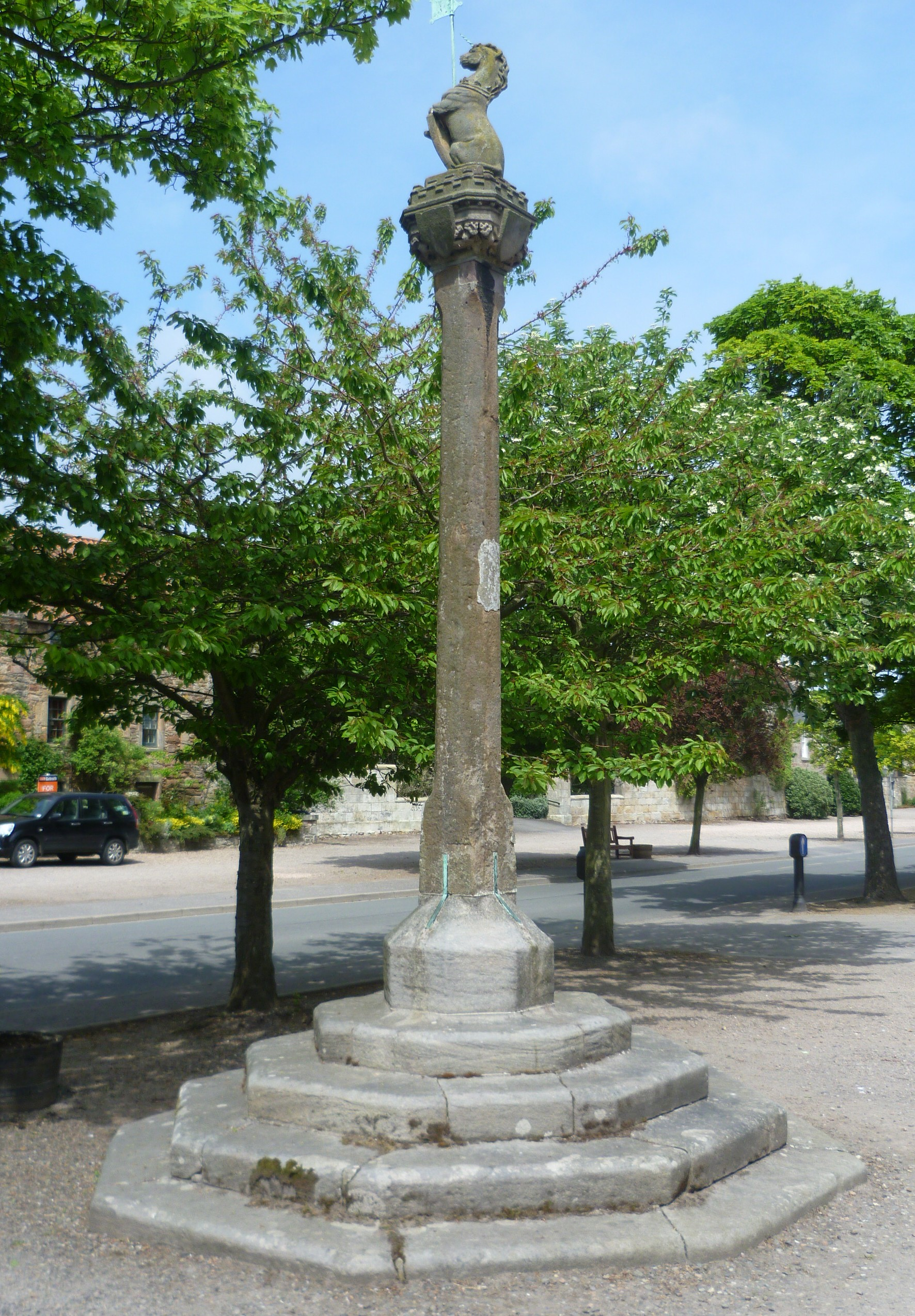
The cross at Crail, Fife

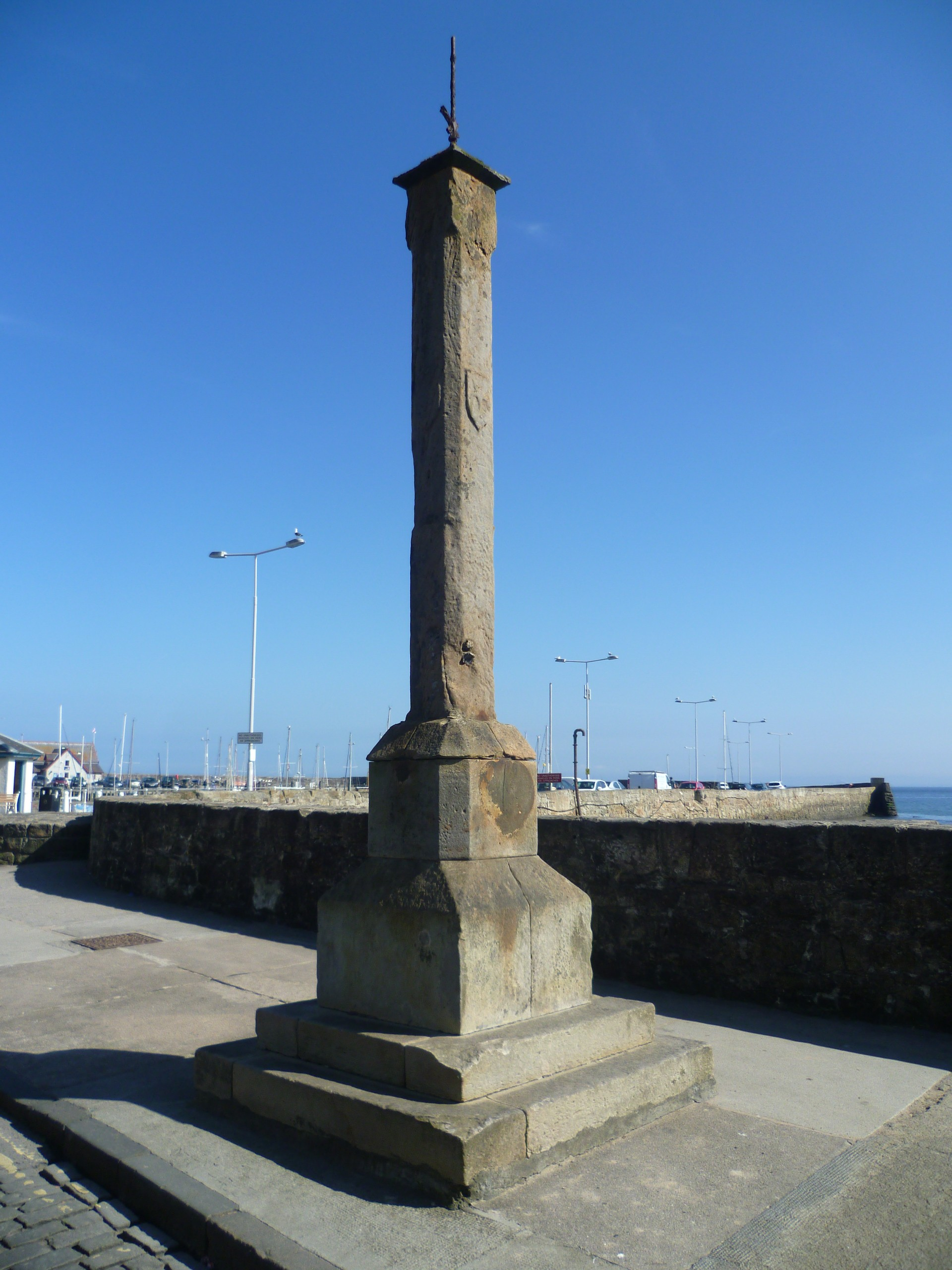
The cross at Anstruther, Fife, missing its finial

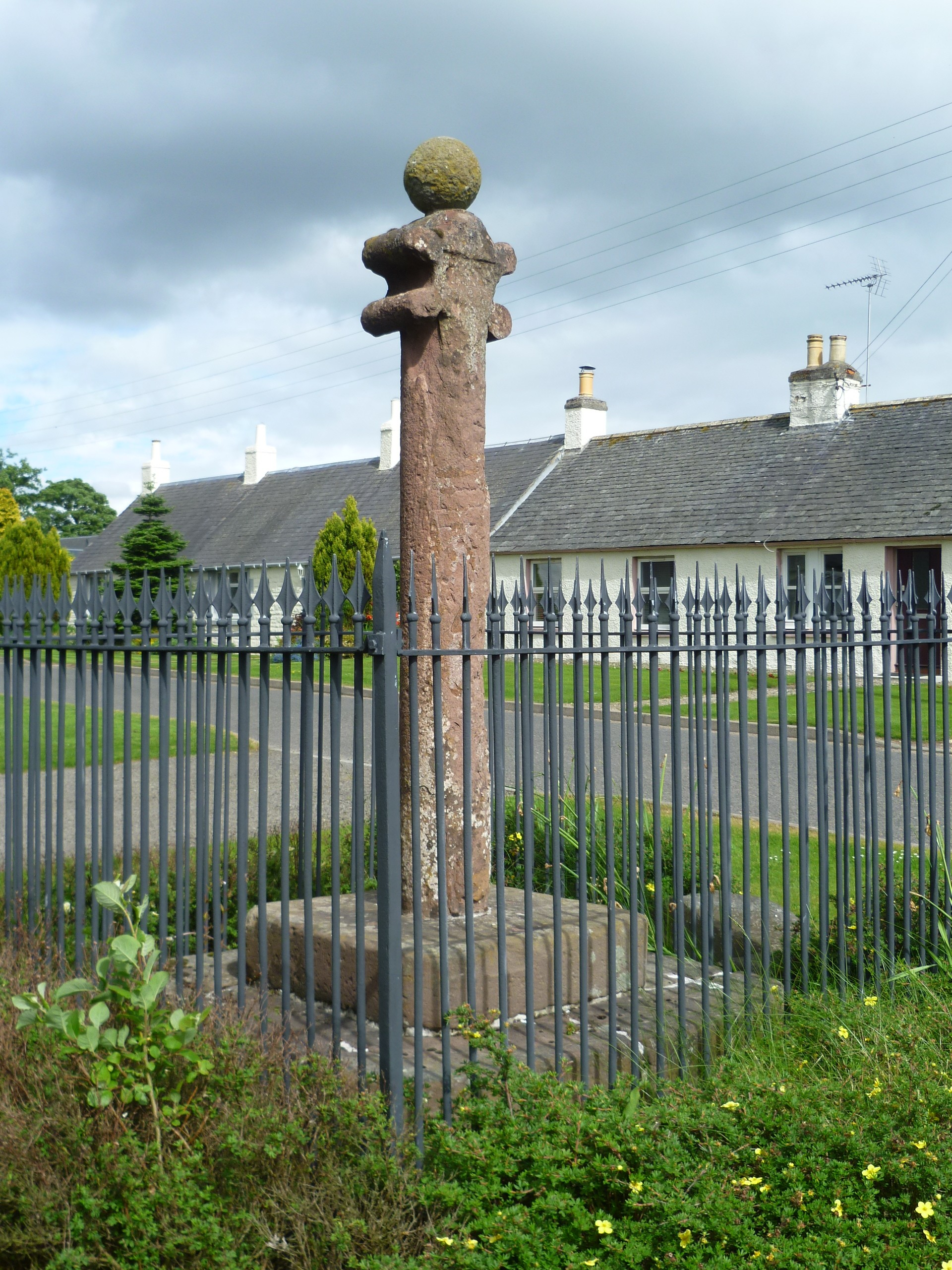
The cross in the village of Kinrossie, Perthshire

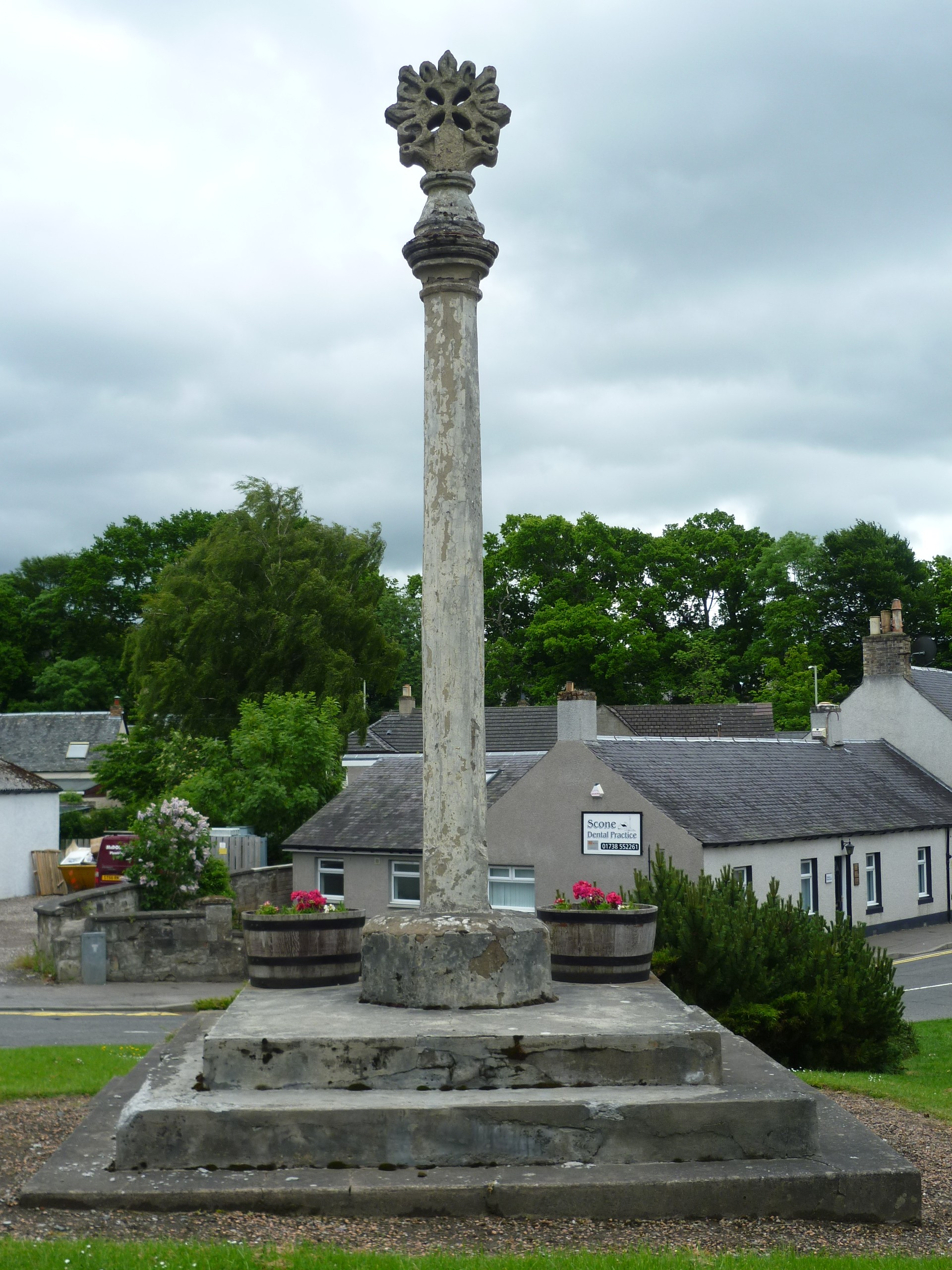
The cross in the 'new' village of Scone, topped by a foliated ornamental cross

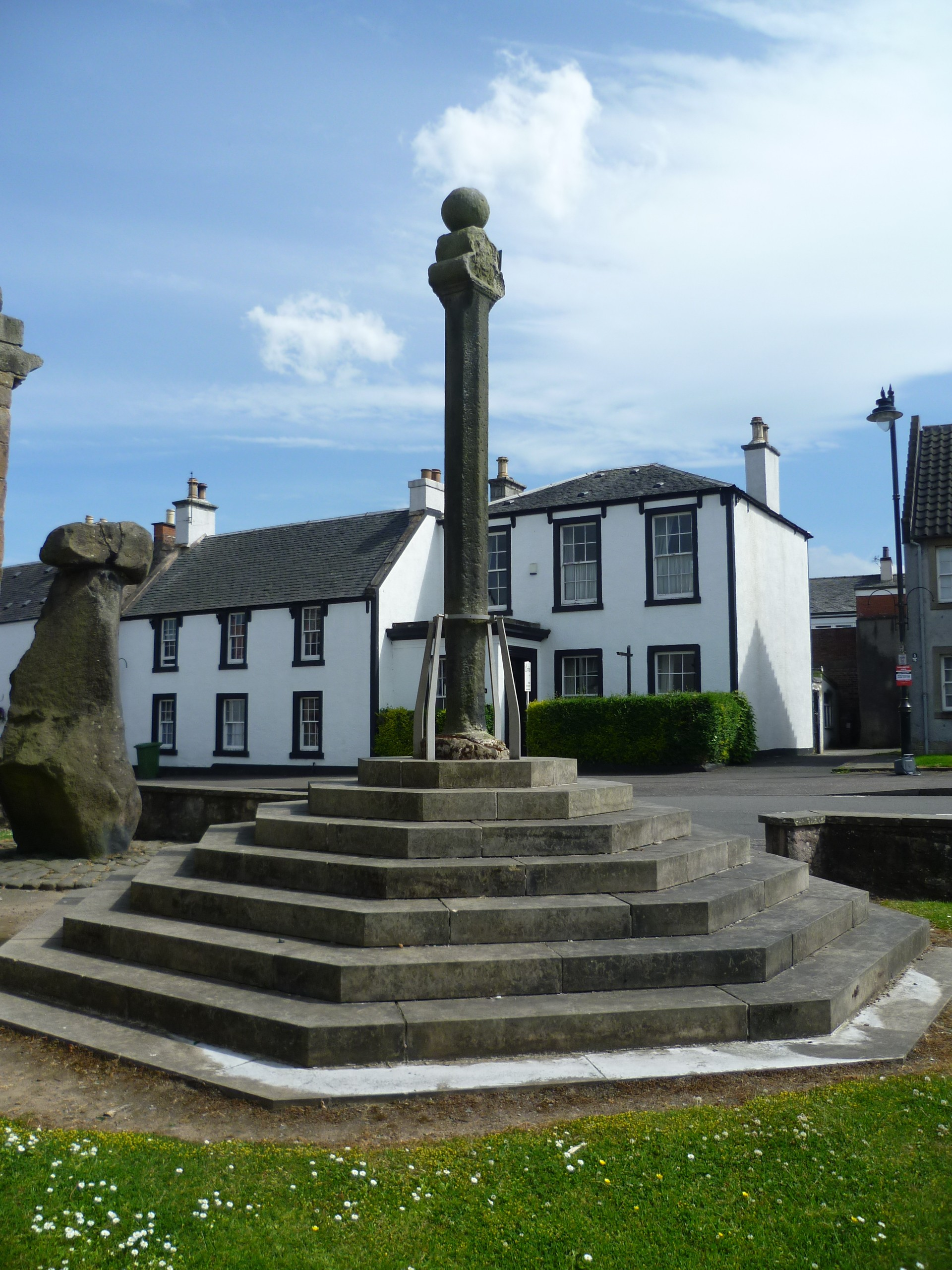
The cross in the town of Clackmannan

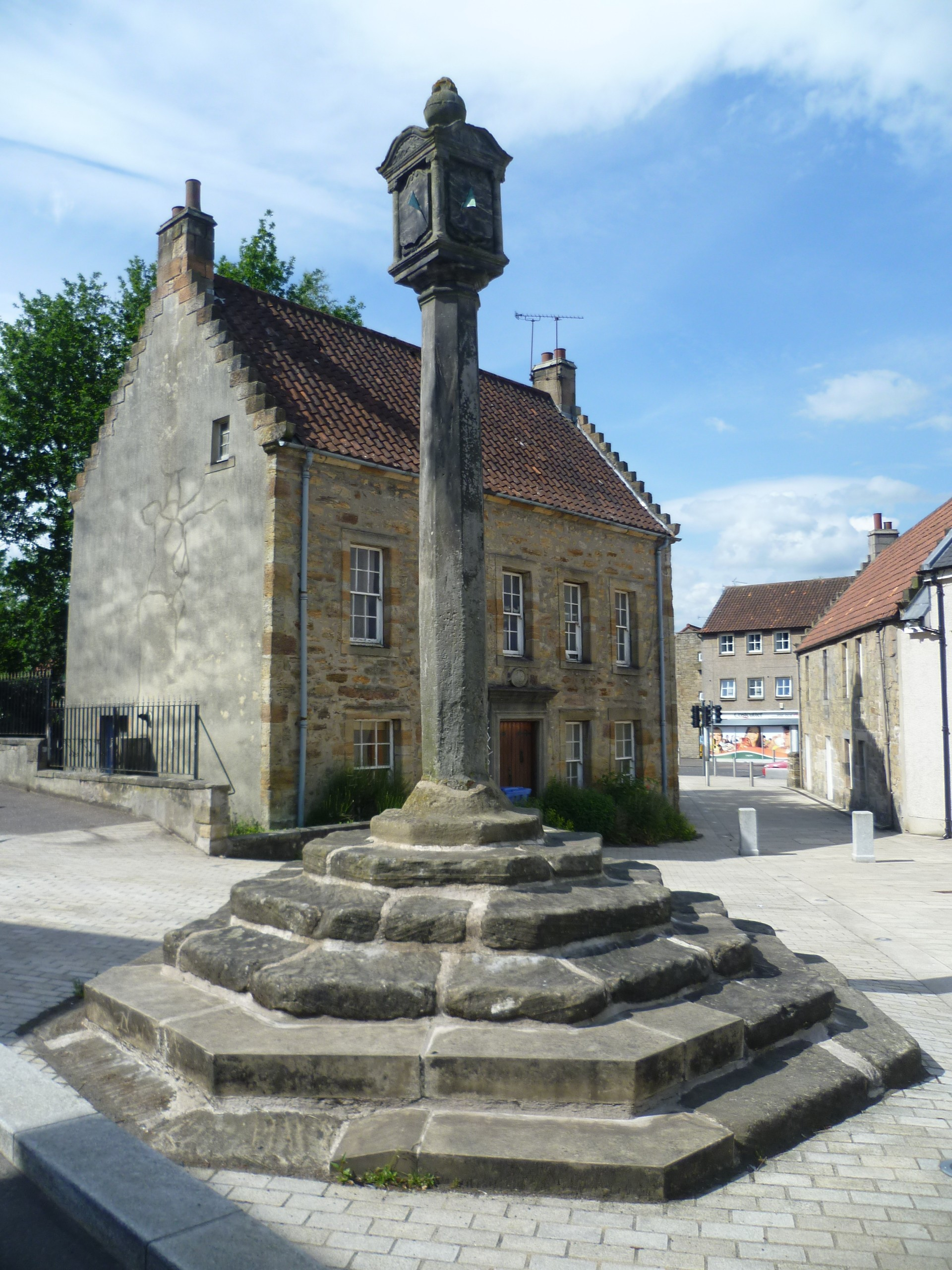
The cross in the village of Airth, near Falkirk, incorporating sundials

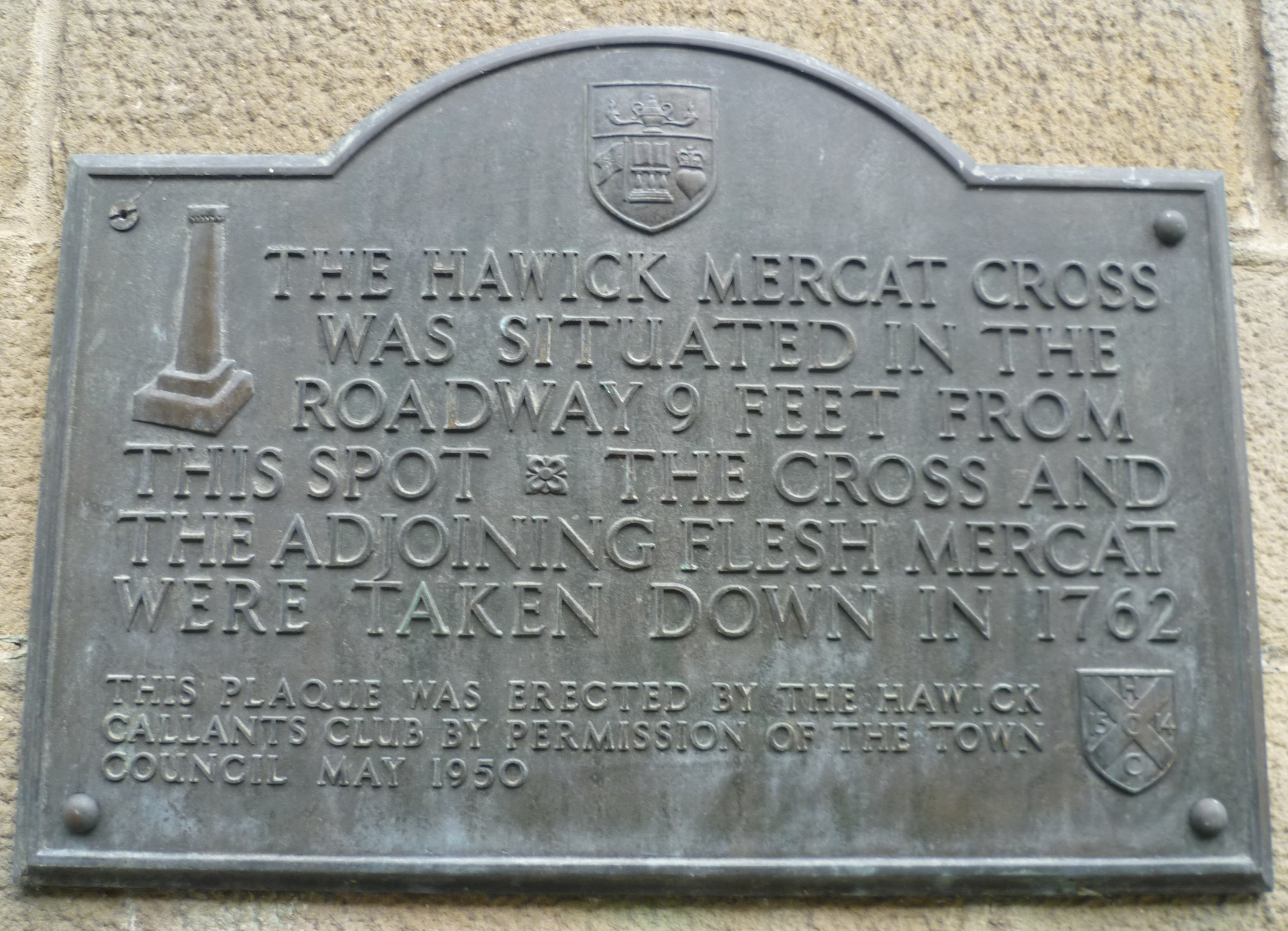
Some towns, like Hawick, in the Scottish Borders, lost their crosses because they were increasingly deemed obstructions to wheeled traffic.

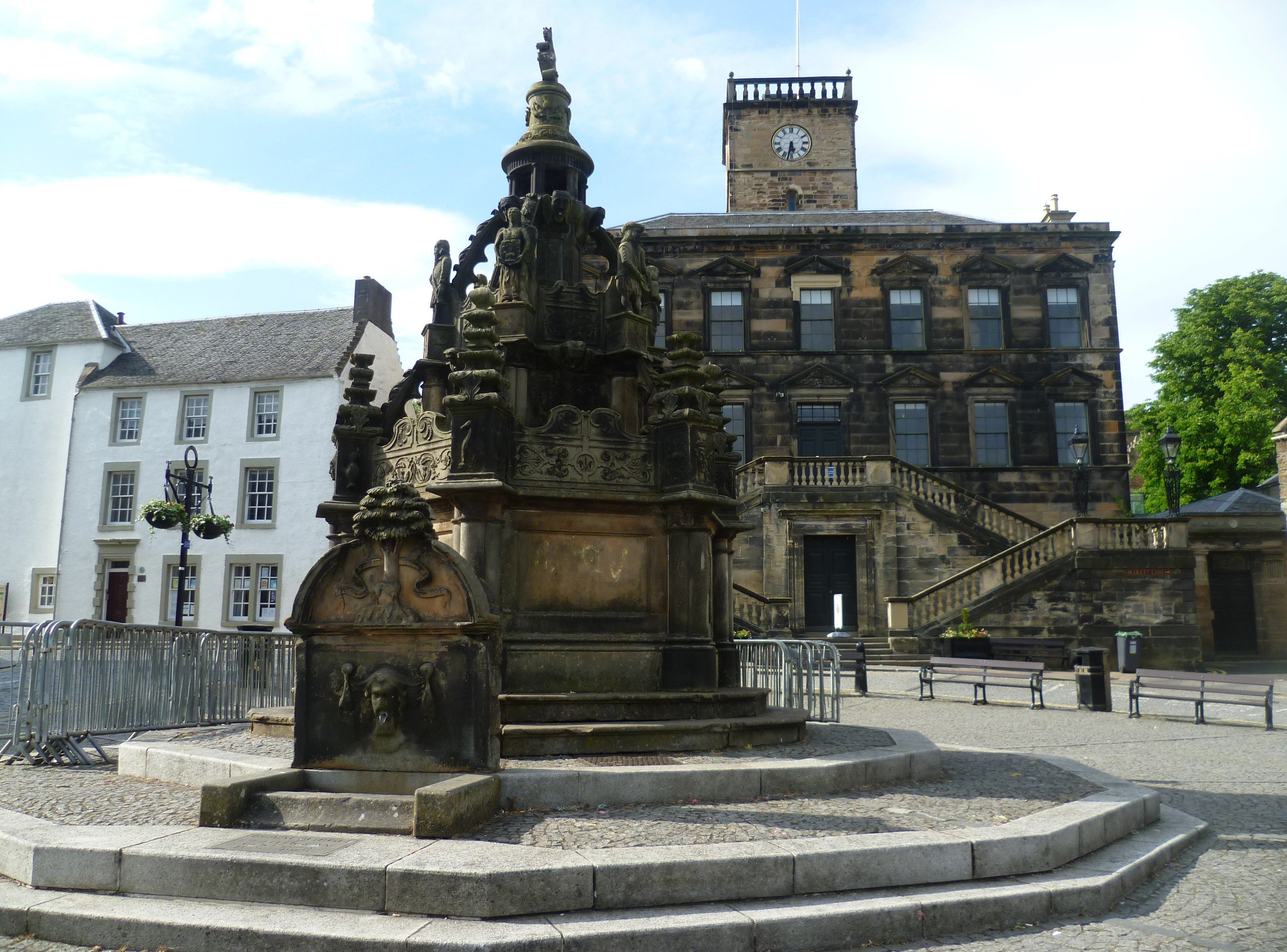
The Cross Well at Linlithgow, modelled on the courtyard fountain of Linlithgow Palace, substitutes for the town's demolished cross.

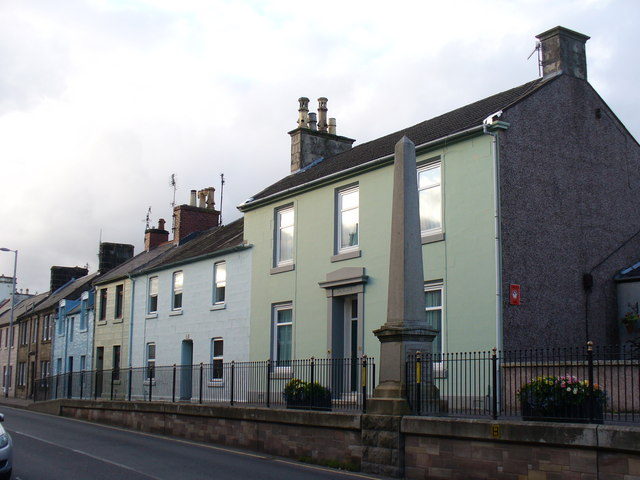
The cross at Sanquhar was transformed into a Covenanter monument in 1856.

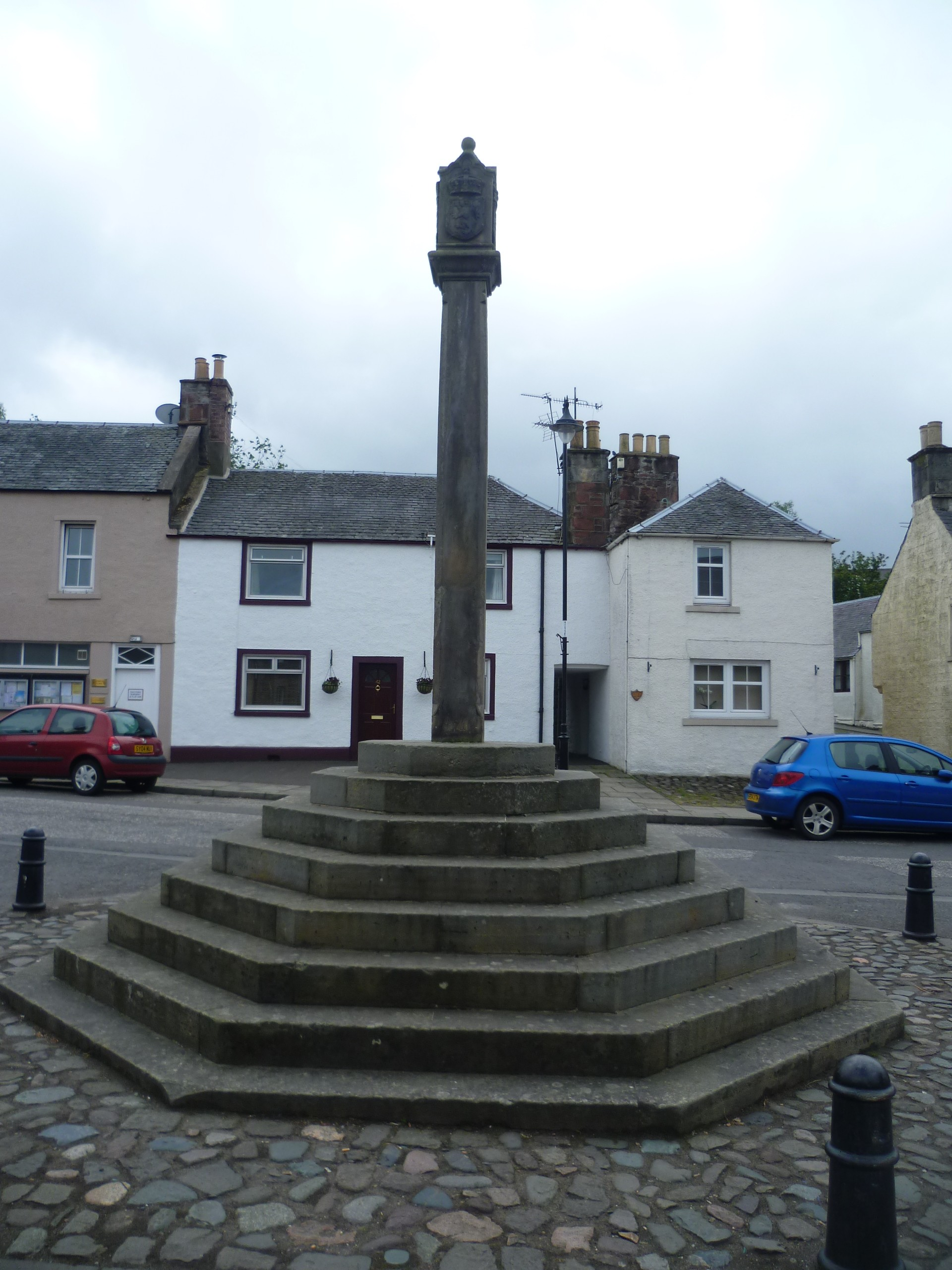
The cross at Abernethy, an example of a war memorial in the form of a mercat cross

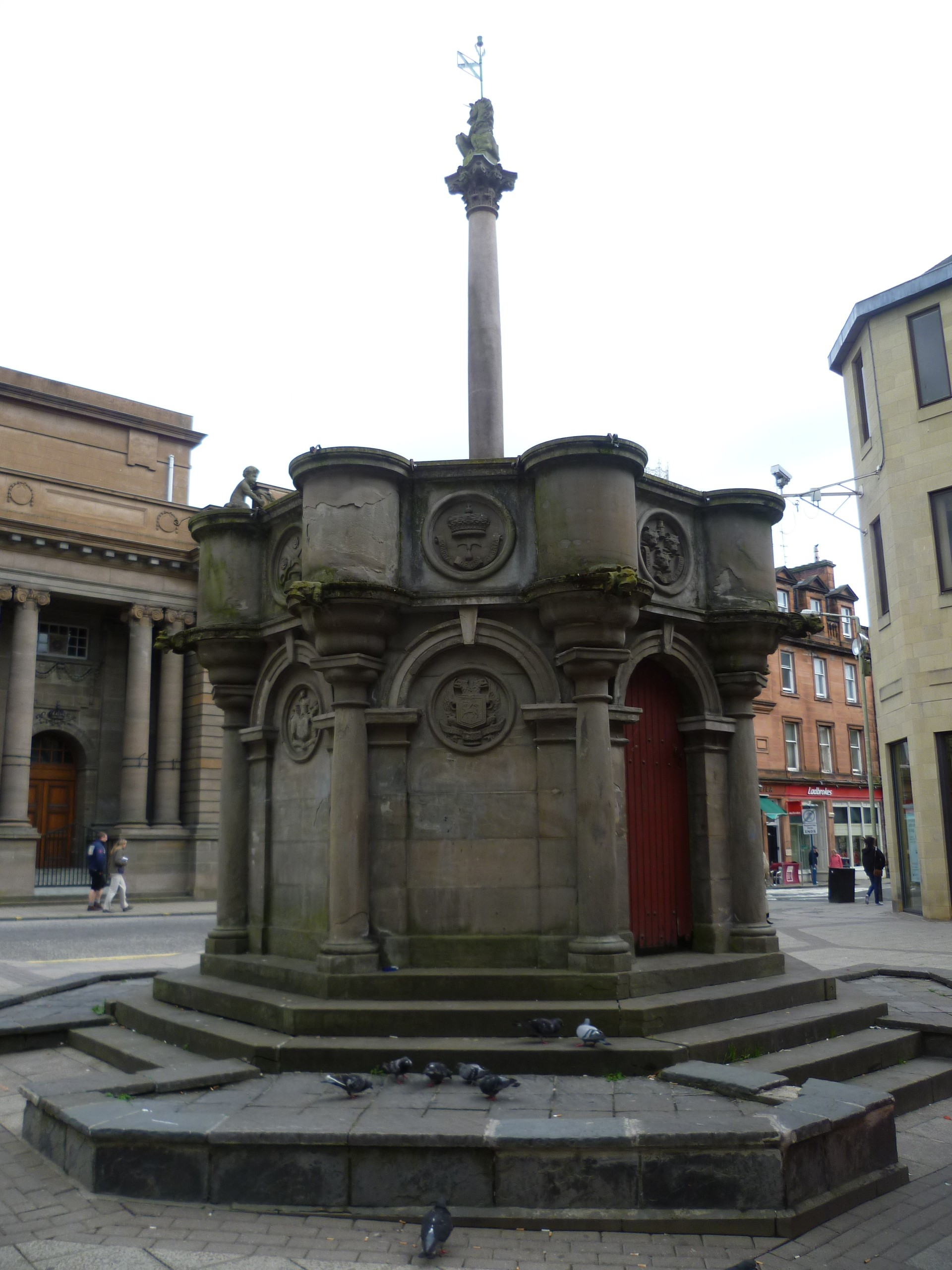
Edward VII Memorial in Perth (1913), replacing the town's original cross, removed in 1763

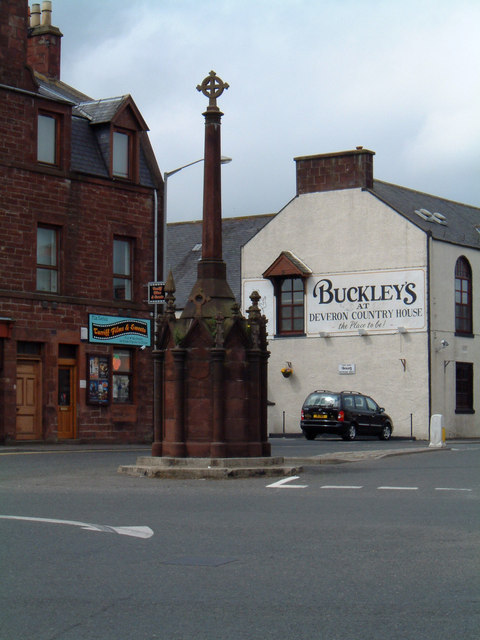
The cross in Turriff, Aberdeenshire, comprises a 16th-century pillar and cruciform top raised on a 19th-century plinth.

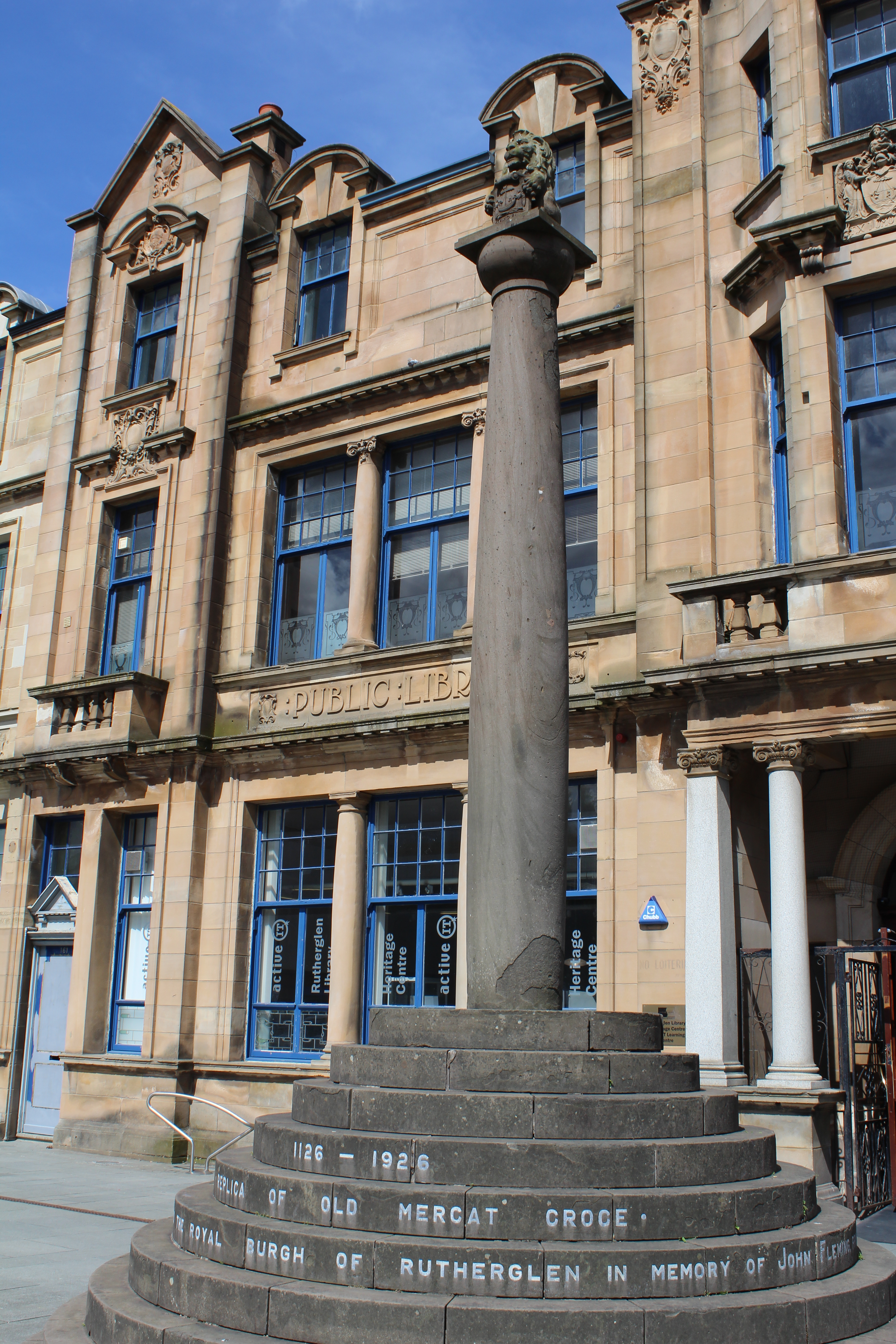
The mercat cross in Rutherglen is a replica erected in 1926 for the town's octocentenary.

== See also ==
- Mercat Cross, Edinburgh
