= Passage =

Passage, The Passage or Le Passage may refer to:

== Arts and entertainment ==
=== Films ===
- Passage (2008 film), a documentary about Arctic explorers
- Passage (2009 film), a short movie about three sisters
- Passage (2020 film), a Canadian documentary film,
- The Passage (1979 film), starring James Mason and Malcolm McDowell
- The Passage (1986 film), a French supernatural thriller film starring Alain Delon
- The Passage (2007 film), by Mark Heller
- The Passage (2011 film), by Roberto Minervini
- The Passage (2018 film), a short film directed by Kitao Sakurai

=== Literature ===
- The Passage (Palmer novel), a 1930 novel by Vance Palmer
- Le Passage, a 1954 French novel by Jean Reverzy
- Passage (Willis novel), a 2001 science fiction novel by Connie Willis
- Passage (Morley novel), a 2007 novel by John David Morley
- Passage (Bujold novel), a 2008 novel by Lois McMaster Bujold
- Le Passage, a 2009 novel by former French President Valéry Giscard d'Estaing
- The Passage (novel series), by Justin Cronin
  - The Passage (Cronin novel), a 2010 novel by Justin Cronin
- Passage Press, a far-right book publisher led by Jonathan Keeperman

=== Music ===
- Passage, or section, a complete musical idea
- Passage (rapper), an alternative hip hop artist based in Oakland, California
- The Passage (band), a punk rock band from the UK

==== Albums ====
- Passage (Bloodrock album), 1972
- Passage (The Carpenters album), 1977
- Passage (The Tannahill Weavers album), 1983
- Passage (Samael album), 1996
- Passages (Ravi Shankar and Philip Glass album), 1990
- The Passage (Andy Narell album) or the title song, 2004
- The Passage (Boy Hits Car album), 2005
- The Passage (DGM album) or the title song, 2016
- Le Passage (album), a 2004 album by Jenifer Bartoli

==== Songs ====
- "Passage", a song by Vienna Teng on her 2004 album Warm Strangers
- "The Passage", a song by Bradley Joseph from the 1997 album Rapture

=== Television ===
- "The Passage" (Battlestar Galactica), a 2006 episode of the science fiction television series
- The Passage (TV series), a science fiction thriller TV series on Fox

=== Other uses in arts and entertainment media ===
- Passage (sculpture), an outdoor 2014 art installation
- Passage (video game), a 2007 computer game

== Architecture ==
- Alley, a narrow street that usually runs between, behind, or within buildings
- Ginnel, a narrow pathway or portal between houses
- Hallway, a room used to connect other rooms
- Pend, a passageway through a building

== Geography ==
- Le Passage, Isère, a commune in France
- Le Passage, Lot-et-Garonne, a commune in France
- Passage Island (disambiguation)
- Passage, 19th century English name for Pasaia, a town and municipality in Spain
- Passage East, County Waterford, Ireland; locally called Passage
- Passage West, County Cork, Ireland; locally called Passage

== Topography ==
- Passage, a distinct section of a cave
- Passage, or strait, a narrow channel of water that connects two larger bodies of water

== Other uses ==
- Passage (legislature), the process of approving a proposed law
- Passage (department store), an upscale department store in Saint Petersburg, Russia
- Passage (dressage), a form of trained slow, animated trot performed by a horse
- The Passage (charity), a charity for homeless and vulnerable people in London

== See also ==
- Passages (disambiguation)
- Passaging, in cell culture
- Rite of passage (disambiguation)
- Rites of passage (disambiguation)
- Safe Passage (disambiguation)
