= Vennel =

Passageway between buildings

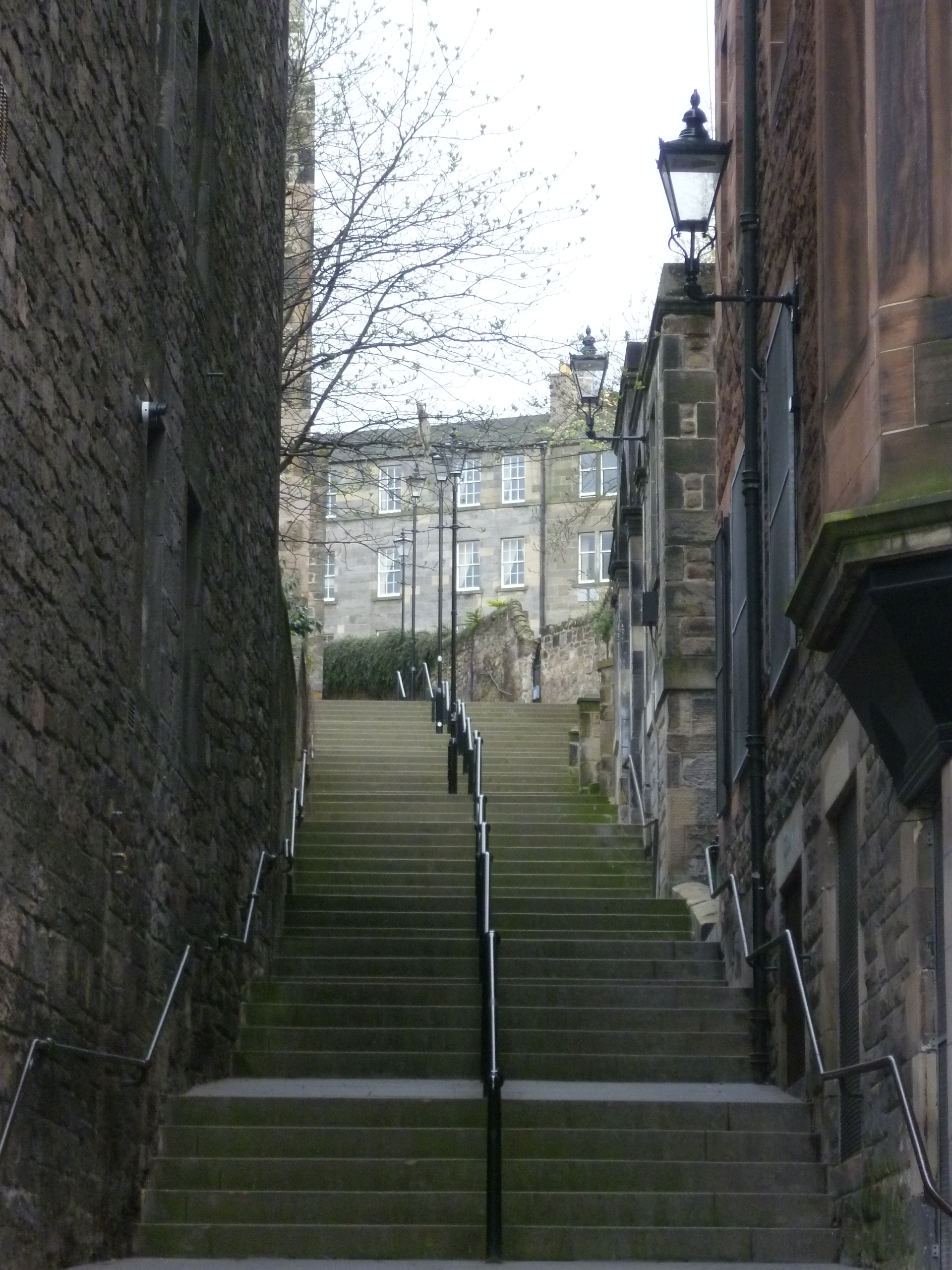
The Vennel, off Edinburgh's Grassmarket

A vennel is a passageway between the gables of two buildings which can in effect be a minor street in Scotland and the north east of England, particularly in the old centre of Durham.

== Etymology ==
In Scotland, the term originated in royal burghs created in the twelfth century, the word deriving from the Old French word venelle meaning "alley" or "lane". Unlike a tenement entry to private property, known as a "close", a vennel was a public way leading from a typical high street to the open ground beyond the burgage plots. The Latin form is venella, related to the English word "funnel".

== Names ==
The Scottish burghs established by David I (see Burghs section of Economy of Scotland in the High Middle Ages) drew upon the burgh model of Newcastle upon Tyne and used a number of French or Germanic words for townscape features. Aberdeen City Council refers to vennels having been part of the old town and historical records suggest Arbroath had a vennel. In the City of Durham, like Newcastle, part of the old kingdom of Northumbria, lanes are also known colloquially as vennels.

== Areas ==
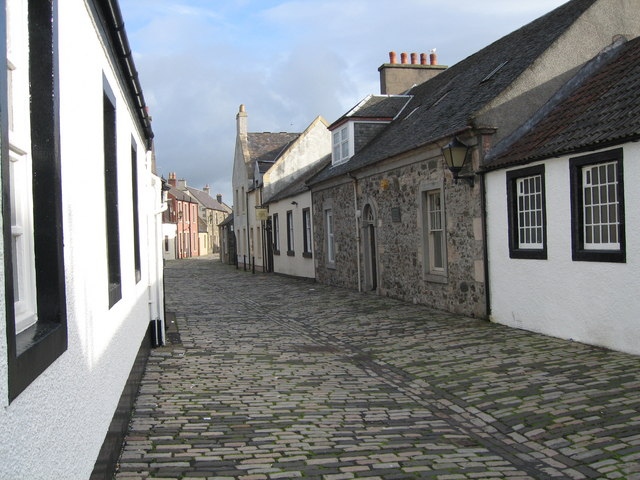
The Glasgow Vennel in Irvine, where Robert Burns lodged while working in the nearby heckling shop.

There are vennels in Ardersier, Cromarty, Culross, Dumfries, Dalry, Dumfries, Dunfermline, Edinburgh, Elie, Eyemouth, Forfar, Irvine, Lanark, Linlithgow, Maybole, North Berwick, Peebles, Perth (see Vennels of Perth), South Queensferry, Stirling and Wigtown. There are also vennels in the towns of Glenarm and Bangor (abandoned in 2021) in Northern Ireland, likely reflecting the Scottish influence in the eastern parts of the province of Ulster. For example, the old name for High Street in Comber was Cow Lane, an anglicisation of its Ulster Scots name Coo Vennel.

The city of Perth has lost many vennels with the gradual transformation of its medieval centre, but some have survived and are still used: Guard Vennel, Cow Vennel, Baxters Vennel, Fleshers Vennel, Oliphants Vennel, Water Vennel and Cutlog Vennel. It was announced on 2 June 2018 that The Vennel steps have been renamed Miss Jean Brodie Steps to commemorate the 100th anniversary of the birth of author Muriel Spark.

== Popular culture ==
The Vennel off the Grassmarket in Edinburgh appears in the film The Prime of Miss Jean Brodie (1969) when Brodie takes her girls on a walk through the Old Town, ending up in Greyfriars Kirkyard.

== See also ==
- Alley – Narrow street that usually runs between, behind, or within buildings
- Ginnel – Narrow pathway or portal between houses
- Pend – Passageway through a building
- Snickleway – Small streets and alleys in York, England
- Wynd – Type of street in Britain
