= Snicket =

Snicket may refer to:

- A narrow alleyway, or a ginnel
- Lemony Snicket, pen name of American Daniel Handler, author of the A Series of Unfortunate Events novels

== Characters ==
- Jacques Snicket, a character in the Series of Unfortunate Events series by author Lemony Snicket
- Kit Snicket, a character in the Series of Unfortunate Events series by author Lemony Snicket
- Lemony Snicket, a character in the Series of Unfortunate Events series by author Lemony Snicket
