= Wynd =

Type of street in Britain

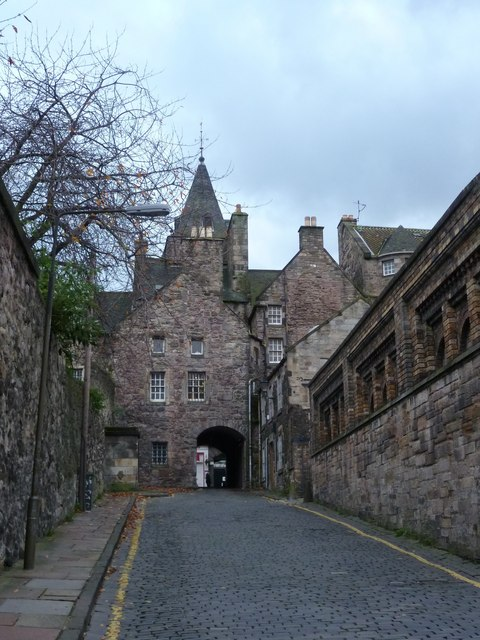
Old Tolbooth Wynd in the Canongate, Edinburgh

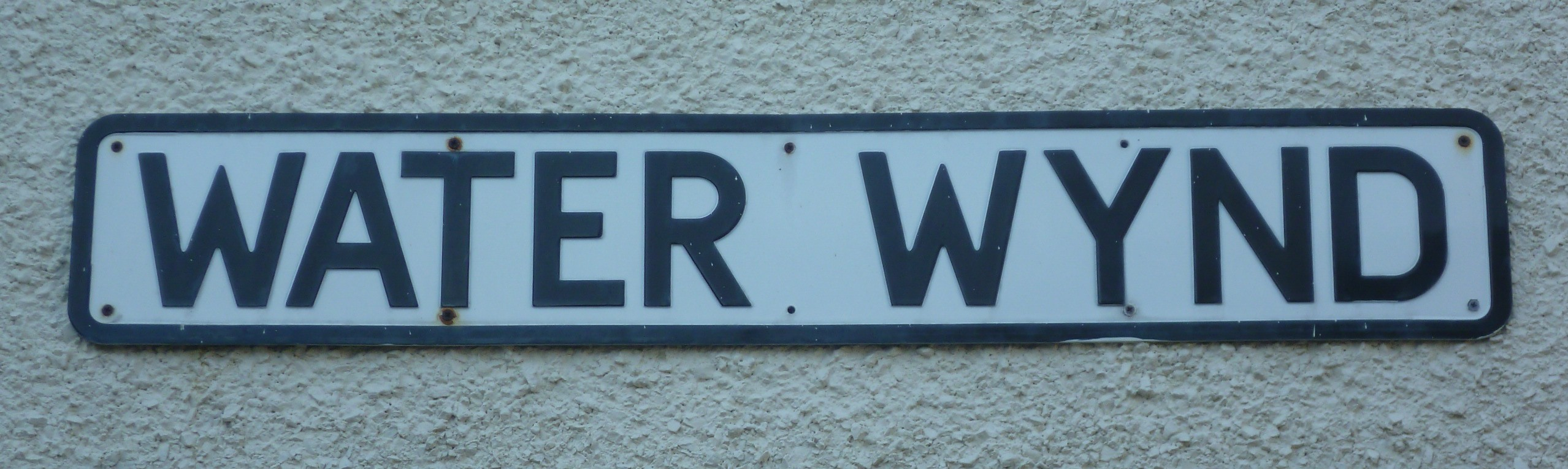
Street sign leading to the harbour in the Scottish fishing village of Pittenweem

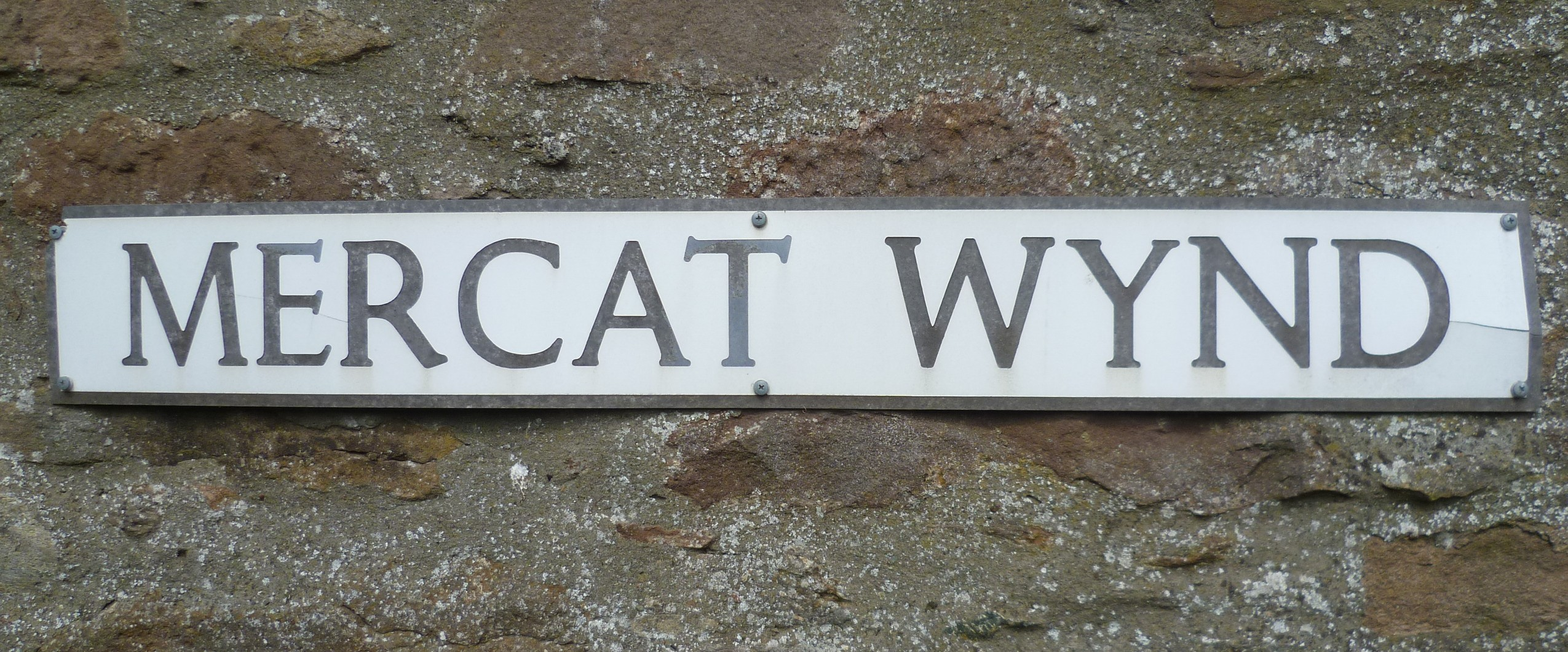
Street sign leading to the market place in the Scottish village of Kinrossie

In Scotland and Northern England, a wynd (/waɪnd/) is a narrow lane between houses. The word derives from Old Norse venda ("to turn"), implying a turning off a main street, without implying that it is curved. In fact, most wynds are straight. In many places wynds link streets at different heights and thus are mostly thought of as being ways up or down hills.

== Locations ==
There are many wynds in North Yorkshire and County Durham, such as "Bull Wynd" in Darlington and Castle Wynd in Richmond, North Yorkshire.

The Old Town of Edinburgh had many wynds, such as St. Mary's Wynd, Blackfriars Wynd and Niddry Wynd, until Victorian street improvements in the 19th century led them to be widened and thus, renamed "streets".

Wynds feature prominently in the city centre of Aberdeen, a testament to the medieval street pattern in the city's past. Before the levelling of St. Catherine's Hill and the construction of Union Street, Back Wynd served as the main thoroughfare to and from The Green, the main point of entry into the city of Aberdeen in the early 1500s. Another medieval wynd still existing in the city centre, Correction Wynd, was built to link the top half of the city to its lower half.

In the East Neuk fishing village of Pittenweem in Fife, all walking connections between the shore and the raised beach—apart from the road down to the harbour—are wynds, namely: West Wynd, Calman's Wynd, Bruce's Wynd, School Wynd, Water Wynd and Cove Wynd. Another School Wynd, in Abernethy, Perth and Kinross, is home to Abernethy Round Tower.

On North Carolina's Bald Head Island the main roads are referred to as wynds, such as North, South and West, Bald Head Wynd and Stede Bonnet Wynd and Edward Teach Wynd.

== See also ==
- Vennel
- Ginnel
