= Economy of Scotland in the Middle Ages =

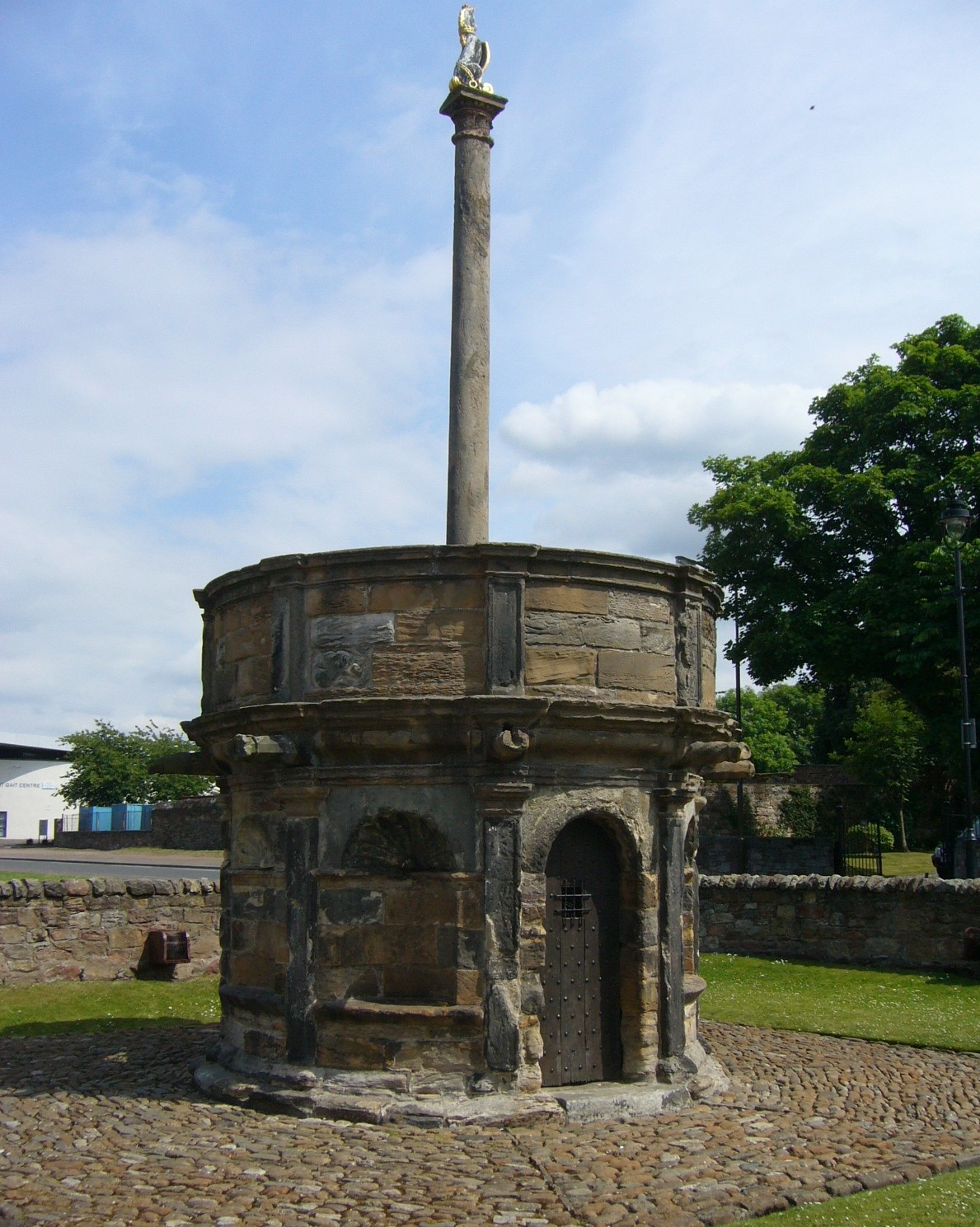
One of the oldest surviving mercat crosses at Prestonpans, East Lothian, which often indicated the commercial centre of a burgh

The economy of Scotland in the Middle Ages covers all forms of economic activity in the modern boundaries of Scotland, between the End of Roman rule in Britain in the early fifth century, until the advent of the Renaissance in the early sixteenth century, including agriculture, crafts and trade. Having between a fifth or sixth (15-20%) of the arable or good pastoral land and roughly the same amount of coastline as England and Wales, marginal pastoral agriculture and fishing were two of the most important aspects of the Medieval Scottish economy. With poor communications, in the early Middle Ages most settlements needed to achieve a degree of self-sufficiency in agriculture. Most farms were operated by a family unit and used an infield and outfield system.

Arable farming grew in the High Middle Ages and agriculture entered a period of relative boom between the thirteenth century and late fifteenth century. Unlike England, Scotland had no towns dating from times of Roman Britain. From the twelfth century there are records of burghs, chartered towns, which became major centre of crafts and trade. There are also Scottish coins, although English coinage probably remained more significant in trade, and until the end of the period barter was probably the most common form of exchange. Craft and industry remained relatively undeveloped before the end of the Middle Ages and, although there were extensive trading networks based in Scotland, while the Scots exported largely raw materials, they imported increasing quantities of luxury goods, resulting in a bullion shortage and perhaps helping to create a financial crisis in the fifteenth century.

== Background ==
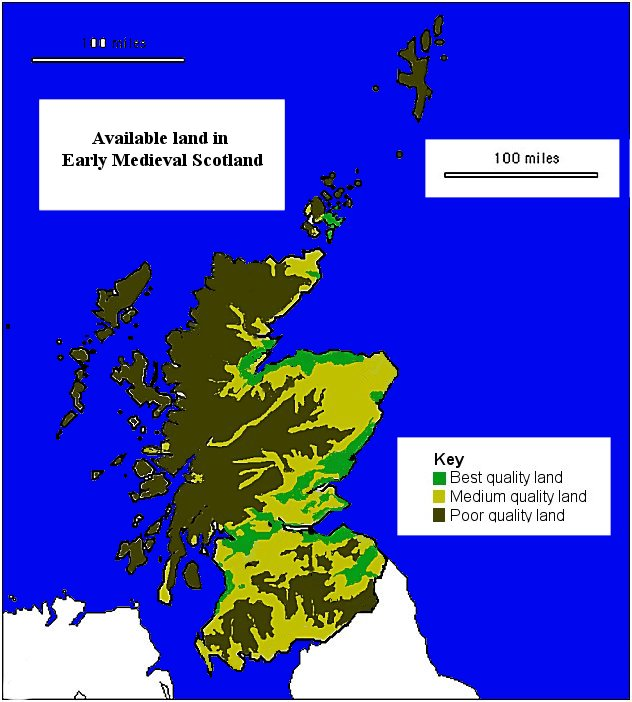
Map of available land in early medieval Scotland.

Scotland is roughly half the size of England and Wales and has approximately the same amount of coastline, but only between a fifth and a sixth of the amount of the arable or good pastoral land, under 60 metres above sea level, and most of this is located in the south and east. This made marginal pastoral farming and fishing the key factors in the pre-modern economy. Its north Atlantic position means that it has very heavy rainfall, which encouraged the spread of blanket peat bog, the acidity of which, combined with high level of wind and salt spray, made most of the western islands treeless. The existence of hills, mountains, quicksands and marshes made internal communication and conquest extremely difficult.

After the departure of the Romans from Northern Britain, in the fifth century four major circles of influence had emerged in what is now Scotland. In the east were the Picts, whose kingdoms eventually stretched from the river Forth to Shetland; in the west the Gaelic (Goidelic)-speaking people of Dál Riata with their royal fortress at Dunadd in Argyll, with close links with the island of Ireland, from which they brought with them the name Scots; in the south was the British (Brythonic) Kingdom of Alt Clut, descendants of the peoples of the Roman-influenced kingdoms of "The Old North"; finally, there were the Angles who had overrun much of southern Britain and held the Kingdom of Bernicia (later the northern part of Northumbria), in the south-east. This situation was transformed from the eighth century when ferocious Viking raids began. Orkney, Shetland and the Western Isles eventually fell to the Norsemen. These threats may have speeded a long-term process of gaelicisation of the Pictish kingdoms, which adopted Gaelic language and customs and which probably facilitated a merger of the Gaelic and Pictish crowns. This culminated in the rise of Cínaed mac Ailpín (Kenneth MacAlpin) in the 840s, which brought to power the House of Alpin, who became the leaders of a combined Gaelic-Pictish kingdom, known as the Kingdom of Alba and later as Scotland.

From the sixth century, Scotland experienced a process of Christianisation, traditionally seen as carried out by Irish-Scots missionaries, including St Ninian, St Kentigern and St Columba and to a lesser extent those from Rome and England. However, Gilbert Markus highlights the fact that most of these figures were not church-founders, but were usually active in areas where Christianity had already become established, probably through gradual diffusion that is almost invisible in the historical record. This would have included trade, conquest and intermarriage.

There are almost no written sources from which to re-construct the demography of Medieval Scotland. Estimates have been for the early period made of a population of 10,000 inhabitants in Dál Riata and 80–100,000 for Pictland, which was probably the largest region. From the formation of the Kingdom of Alba in the tenth century, to before the Black Death reached the country in 1349, estimates based on the amount of farmable land, suggest that population may have grown from half a million to a million. Although there is no reliable documentation on the impact of the plague, if the pattern followed that in England, then the population may have fallen to as low as half a million by the end of the fifteenth century.

== Agriculture ==
In the early Middle Ages, poor transport forced self-sufficiency on small settlements. Lacking the urban centres created under the Romans in the rest of Britain, the economy of Scotland in the early Middle Ages was overwhelmingly agricultural. With a lack of significant transport links and wider markets, most farms had to produce a self-sufficient diet of meat, dairy products and cereals, supplemented by hunter-gathering. Limited archaeological evidence indicates that throughout Northern Britain, farming was done on single homesteads or amongst a small cluster of three or four homes. Each of these probably contained a nuclear family, with kinship relationships likely to be common among neighbouring houses and settlements, reflecting the partition of land through inheritance. A system was adopted that distinguished between the infield, around the settlement, where crops were grown every year, and the outfield, further away, where crops were grown and then left fallow in different years. This would be the predominant system until the eighteenth century.

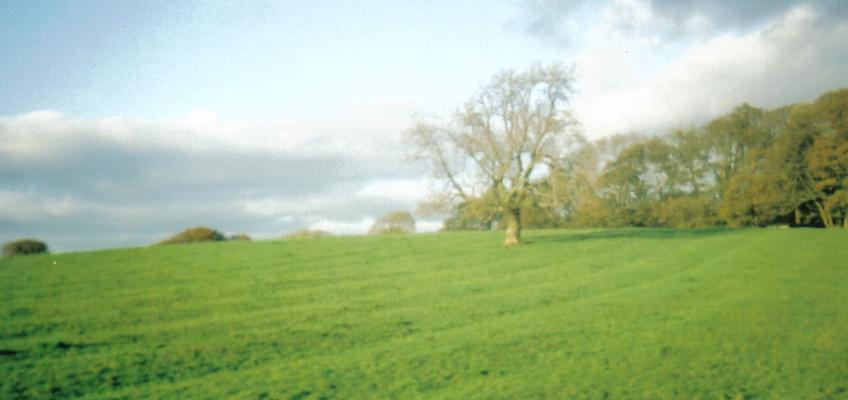
Rig and furrow marks at Buchans Field, Wester Kittochside.

The nature of agricultural production was determined by the land and climate. The cold and wet climate meant that more oats and barley were grown than corn. The evidence of bones indicates that cattle were by far the most important domesticated animal, followed by pigs, sheep and goats, while domesticated fowl were very rare. Bone evidence indicates that there was a significant growth in the fish trade around 1000. This increased marine exploitation of the Highlands and Islands may have been as a result of the arrival of Scandinavian settlers in this period.

The early Middle Ages were a period of climatic deterioration, with a drop in temperature and an increase in rainfall, resulting in more land becoming unproductive. Climate change had a major impact on agriculture in this period and terms emerged to describe different quantities of land. In the period c. 1150 to 1300, warm dry summers and less severe winters allowed cultivation at much greater heights above sea level and made land more productive. Arable farming grew significantly, but was still more common in low-lying areas than in high-lying areas such as the Highlands, Galloway and the Southern Uplands. The main unit of land measurement in Scotland was the ploughgate, also known as the davoch and in Lennox as the arachor. It may have measured about 104 acres (0.42 km^{2}), divided into 4 raths. The average amount of land used by a husbandman in Scotland might have been around 26 acres.

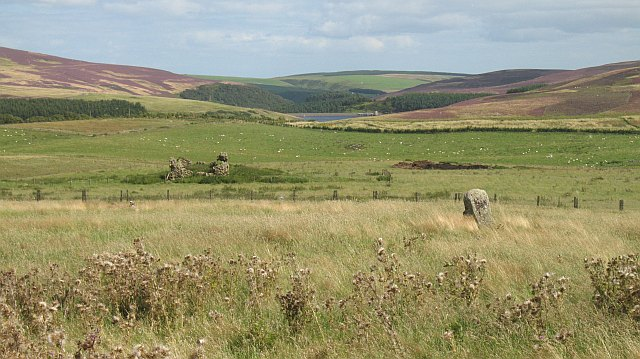
The ruins of Penshiel Tower, East Lothian, a sheep grange of Melrose Abbey

Most farming was based on the lowland fermtoun or Highland baile, settlements of a handful of families that jointly farmed an area notionally suitable for two or three plough teams, allocated in run rigs to tenant farmers. They usually ran downhill so that they included both wet and dry land, helping to offset some of the problems of extreme weather conditions. Most ploughing was done with a heavy wooden plough with an iron coulter, pulled by oxen, which were more effective in heavy soils and cheaper to feed than horses. Obligations to the local lord usually included supplying oxen for ploughing the lord's land on an annual basis and the much resented obligation to grind corn at the lord's mill.

In the late Middle Ages, average temperatures began to reduce again, with cooler and wetter conditions limiting the extent of arable agriculture, particularly in the Highlands. The introduction of new monastic orders such as the Cistercians in this period also brought innovations in agriculture. Their monasteries became major landholders, particularly in the Borders. They were sheep farmers and producers of wool for the markets in Flanders. By the late Middle Ages, Melrose Abbey and the Earl of Douglas had about 15,000 sheep apiece, making them among the largest sheep farmers in Europe.

New farming methods began to transform agriculture in some parts of the country. Monastic agriculture was organised in granges, farms run by lay brothers of the order. Granges were theoretically within 30 miles of the mother monastery, so that those working there could return for services on Sundays and feast days. They were used for variety of purposes, including pastoral, arable and industrial production. However, to manage more distant assets in Ayrshire, Melrose Abbey used Mauchline as a "super grange", to oversee lesser granges. The rural economy appears to have boomed in the thirteenth century and was still buoyant in the immediate aftermath of the Black Death, which reached Scotland in 1349, and may have carried off a third of the population. However, by the 1360s there was a severe falling off in incomes that can be seen in clerical benefices, of between a third and half compared with the beginning of the era, to be followed by a slow recovery in the fifteenth century.

== Burghs ==
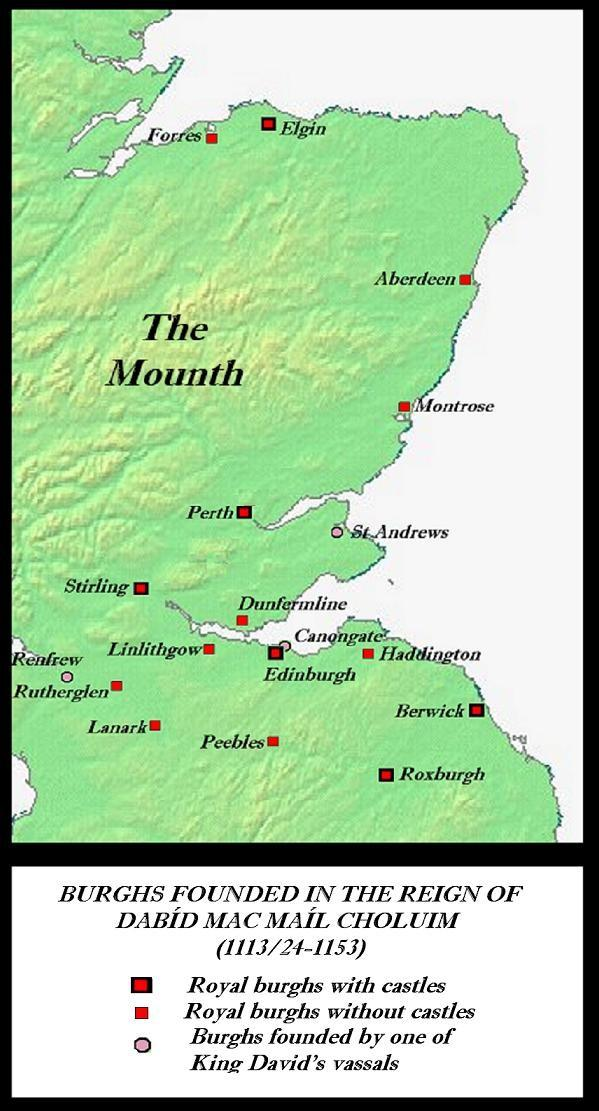
Burghs established before 1153

Records of burghs, small towns granted legal privileges from the crown, can be found from the eleventh century. Burghs (a term derived from the Germanic word for fortress), developed rapidly during the reign of David I (1124–53). Up until this point there were no identifiable towns in Scotland. Most of the burghs that were granted charters in his reign probably already existed as settlements. Charters were copied almost verbatim from those used in England, and early citizens, called burgesses, that were usually English or Flemish. They were able to impose tolls and fines on traders within a region outside their settlements. Most of the early burghs were on the east coast, and among them were the largest and wealthiest, including Aberdeen, Berwick, Perth and Edinburgh, whose growth was facilitated by trade with the European continent. In the south-west, Glasgow, Ayr and Kirkcudbright were aided by the less-profitable sea trade with Ireland, and to a lesser extent France and Spain.

Burghs had unique layouts and economic functions. They were typically surrounded by a palisade or possessed a castle, and usually had a marketplace, with a widened high street or junction, often marked by a mercat cross (market cross), beside houses for the burgesses and other inhabitants. The foundations of around 15 burghs can be traced to the reign of David I and there is evidence of 55 burghs by 1296. In addition to the major royal burghs, the late Middle Ages saw the proliferation of baronial and ecclesiastical burghs, with 51 being created between 1450 and 1516. Most of these were much smaller than their royal counterparts. Excluded from international trade they mainly acted as local markets and centres of craftsmanship. In general, burghs probably carried out far more local trading with their hinterlands than nationally or internationally, relying on them for food and raw materials.

== Manufacture and trade ==
While burghs acted as centres of basic crafts. These included the manufacture of shoes, clothes, dishes, pots, joinery, bread and ale, which would normally be sold to inhabitants and visitors on market days. However, there were relatively few developed manufacturing industries in Scotland for most of this period. By the late fifteenth century, there were the beginnings of a native iron-casting industry, which led to the production of cannon and of the silver and goldsmithing for which the country would later be known. As a result, the most important exports were unprocessed raw materials, including wool, hides, salt, fish, animals and coal, while Scotland remained frequently short of wood, iron and, in years of bad harvests, grain, which was imported in large quantities, particularly from the Baltic ports, through Berwick and Ayr.

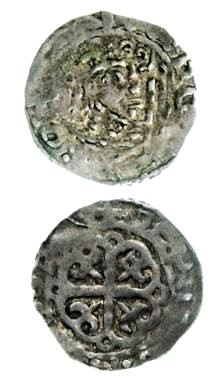
A silver penny of David I, the first silver coinage to bear a Scottish king's head.

Limited sources for the early Middle Ages indicate that there was some trade of luxury goods with continental Europe. For most of the period there are not the detailed custom accounts that exist for England, that can provide an understanding of foreign trade, with the first records for Scotland dating to the 1320s. In the early Middle Ages, the rise of Christianity meant that wine and precious metals were imported for use in religious rites, and there are occasional references of trips to and from foreign countries, such as the incident recorded by Adomnán in which St Columba went to a port to await ships bearing news, and presumably other items, from Italy. Imported goods found in archaeological sites of the period include ceramics and glass, while many sites indicate iron and precious metal working.

In the High Middle Ages, although the Scottish economy was still dominated by agriculture and by short-distance, local trade, there was an increasing amount of foreign trade. Coins were replacing barter goods, with Scottish coins being struck from the reign of David I. Mints were established at Berwick, Roxburgh, Edinburgh and Perth, but until the end of the period most exchange was done without the use of metal currency, and English coins probably outnumbered Scottish ones. Until the disruption caused by the outbreak of the Wars of Independence in the early fourteenth century, most naval trade was probably coastal and most foreign trade was with England. The wars closed English markets and raised the levels of piracy and disruption to naval trade on both sides. They may have led to an increase in continental trade, and isolated references indicate that Scottish ships were active in Norway and Danzig, and the earliest records from the 1330s indicate that five-sixths of this trade was in the hands of Scottish merchants.

Wool and hides were the major exports in the late Middle Ages. From 1327 to 1332, the earliest period for which figures survive, the annual average was 5,700 sacks of wool and 36,100 leather hides. The disruption of the Wars of Independence, which not only limited trade but damaged much of the valuable agricultural land of the Borders and Lowlands, meant that this fell in the period 1341–42 to 1342–43 to 2,450 sacks of wool and 17,900 hides. The trade recovered to reach a peak in the 1370s, with an annual average of 7,360 sacks, but the international recession from the 1380s saw a reduction to an annual average of 3,100 sacks. The introduction of sheep-scab was a serious blow to the wool trade from the early fifteenth century. Despite a levelling-off, in the Low Countries there was another drop in exports as the markets collapsed in the early-sixteenth century. Unlike in England, this did not prompt the Scots to turn to large-scale cloth production and only poor-quality rough cloths seem to have been significant.

Exports of hides and particularly cod, where the Scots held a decisive advantage in quality over their rivals, appear to have held up much better than wool, despite the general economic downturn in Europe in the aftermath of the Black Death. Exports of hides averaged 56,400 a year from 1380 to 1384, but fell to an average of 48,000 over the next five years and to 34,200 by the end of the century. In the late Middle Ages, the growing desire among the court, lords, upper clergy and wealthier merchants for luxury goods, that largely had to be imported (including fine cloth from Flanders and Italy), led to a chronic shortage of bullion. This, and perennial problems in royal finance, led to several debasements of the coinage, with the amount of silver in a penny being cut to almost a fifth between the late fourteenth century and the late fifteenth century. The heavily debased "black money", introduced in 1480, had to be withdrawn two years later and may have helped fuel a financial and political crisis.

== See also ==
- Economic history of Scotland
- Economy of Scotland in the High Middle Ages
