= Ritual (disambiguation) =

A ritual is the scripted performance of ceremonial action, usually for a perceived supernatural purpose.

Ritual(s) or The Ritual may also refer to:

== Film and television ==
- Ritual (2000 film) or Shiki-Jitsu, a Japanese film directed by Hideaki Anno
- Ritual (2002 film), a Tales from the Crypt film
- Ritual (2012 film), an Indonesian horror thriller film
- Ritual (2013 film), an American horror film
- Ghatashraddha, a 1977 Kannada-language Indian film released as The Ritual internationally
- The Ritual (2009 film), an American horror film
- The Ritual (2017 film), a British horror film
- The Ritual (2025 film), a horror film starring Al Pacino
- Rituals (film), a 1977 Canadian horror/thriller film directed by Peter Carter
- Ritual (TV play), a 1970 Australian teleplay by Alan Hopgood
- Rituals (TV series), a 1984–1985 American soap opera

== Literature ==
- Ritual (Pinner novel), a 1967 novel by David Pinner; basis for the 1973 film The Wicker Man
- Ritual, a 2008 novel by Mo Hayder
- The Ritual (novel), a 2011 novel by Adam Nevill
- Rituals (novel), a 1980 novel by Cees Nooteboom
- Roman Ritual, a Catholic book containing liturgies for certain services

== Music ==
=== Bands ===
- Ritual (post-punk band), an English post-punk and gothic rock band (1981–1983)
- Ritual (electronic band), an English electronic pop band formed in 2014

=== Albums ===
- Ritual (The Black Dahlia Murder album), 2011
- Ritual (Fernando Otero album), 2015
- Ritual (In This Moment album), 2017
- Ritual (Jape album), 2008
- Ritual (Jon Hopkins album), 2024
- Ritual (Keith Jarrett album) or the title song, 1982
- Ritual (Los Piojos album), 1999
- Ritual. (Master's Hammer album) or the title song, 1991
- Ritual (Oomph! album), 2019
- Ritual (Peter Frohmader album), 1986
- Ritual (Shaman album) or the title song, 2002
- Ritual (Soulfly album) or the title song, 2018
- Ritual (White Lies album), 2011
- Ritual: The Modern Jazz Messengers, by Art Blakey and the Jazz Messengers, or the title song, 1960
- Ritual, by Vampires Everywhere!, 2016
- Ritual, an EP by Envy on the Coast, 2017
- The Ritual (Testament album) or the title song, 1992
- The Ritual, by Sabac, 2008
- Rituals (Fenech-Soler album) or the title songs, 2013
- Rituals (John Zorn album), 2005
- Rituals (Rotting Christ album), 2016
- Rituals, by Shapeshifter, 2020
- Rituals (Watchhouse album), 2025

=== Songs ===
- "Ritual" (Marshmello song), 2016
- "Ritual" (Tiësto, Jonas Blue and Rita Ora song), 2019
- "Ritual" (Within Temptation song), 2023
- "Ritual", by Annihilator from Waking the Fury, 2002
- "Ritual", by Black Veil Brides from Set the World on Fire, 2011
- "Ritual", by Crystal Lake from Helix, 2018
- "Ritual", by Dan Reed Network, 1988
- "Ritual", by Delerium from Mythologie, 2016
- "Ritual", by The Devil Wears Prada from Flowers, 2025
- ”Ritual”, by Ellie Goulding from the deluxe edition of her album Halcyon
- "Ritual", by Ghost from Opus Eponymous, 2010
- "Ritual", by Gorgoroth from Pentagram, 1994
- "Ritual", by Meshuggah from None, 1994
- "Ritual", by Waterparks from Intellectal Property, 2023
- "Ritual (Nous Sommes du Soleil)", by Yes from Tales from Topographic Oceans, 1973
- "The Ritual", by Blue Stahli from Antisleep Vol. 03, 2012
- "The Ritual", by Heavenly from Dust to Dust, 2004
- "The Ritual", by Primal Fear from Apocalypse, 2018
- "The Ritual", by Quiet Riot from Alive and Well, 1999
- "Rituals", by Rolo Tomassi from Time Will Die and Love Will Bury It, 2018
- "Rituals", by This Will Destroy You from Moving on the Edges of Things, 2010

== Other uses ==
- Ritual Entertainment, a computer game software developer

== See also ==
- Rite (disambiguation)
- Ritualization
