= Rite =

Rite may refer to:

== Religion ==
- Ritual, an established ceremonious act
- Rite (Christianity), sacred rituals in the Christian religion
- Ritual family, Christian liturgical traditions; often also called liturgical rites
- Catholic particular churches and liturgical rites, within the Catholic Church
- Christian liturgy, traditional patterns of worship in Christianity
- Li (Confucianism), rites in the Confucian ritual religion
- Nusach (Jewish custom), rites of worship in Judaism
- Rite of passage, a ceremonious act associated with social transition
- Sacrament, rites in Christianity including baptism, communion, and last rites
- Samskara (rite of passage), rites of passage in Indic religions and cultures

== Arts, entertainment, and media ==
- Rite (album), a 1993 ambient album by Julian Cope and Donald Ross Skinner
- Rites (album) a 1998 jazz album by Norwegian saxophonist Jan Garbarek
- The Rite (1969 film), a Swedish drama film
- The Rite (2011 film), an American horror film
- Quarry (novel), a 2011 book by Ally Kennen, originally entitled Rites
- Sacred Rite (band), American heavy metal band active from the 1980s to the 2000s

== Other uses ==
- RITE Method, usability testing method
- Masonic rites, a series of degrees of initiation in Freemasonry
- Mount Rite, a mountain in the Dolomites in the Veneto region of Italy
- RITES, an Indian company

== See also ==
- Rite of passage (disambiguation)
- Ritual (disambiguation)
- Syriac Rite (disambiguation)
