= School Wynd =

Street in Abernethy, Scotland

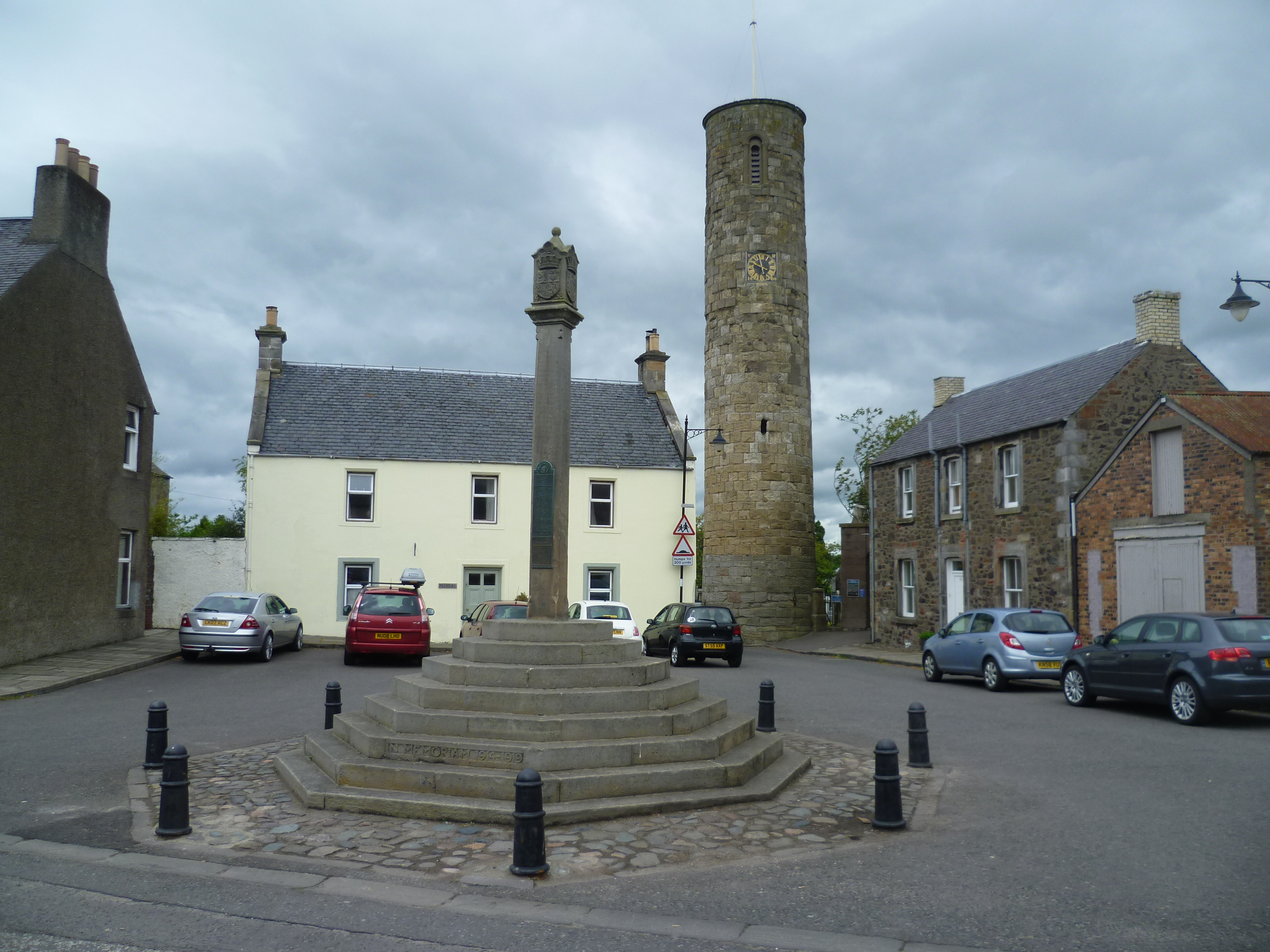
- Abernethy's mercat cross and round tower in School Wynd, looking north from Main Street in 2013
- Maintained by: Perth and Kinross Council
- Location: Abernethy, Perth and Kinross, Scotland, UK
- Coordinates: 56.333384°N 3.312318°W
- North: Back Dykes
- South: Main Street

Construction
- Completion: 18th century

School Wynd is a street and open space in the centre of Abernethy, Perth and Kinross, Scotland. Running between Main Street in the south and Back Dykes in the north, it is the site of Abernethy Round Tower, a scheduled monument dating to the 18th century. The street is named for the school which formerly operated on it, a building now occupied by Abernethy Museum.

The village's Category C listed parish church and mercat cross also stand on School Wynd.

== See also ==
- Wynd
