= Pend =

Passageway through a building

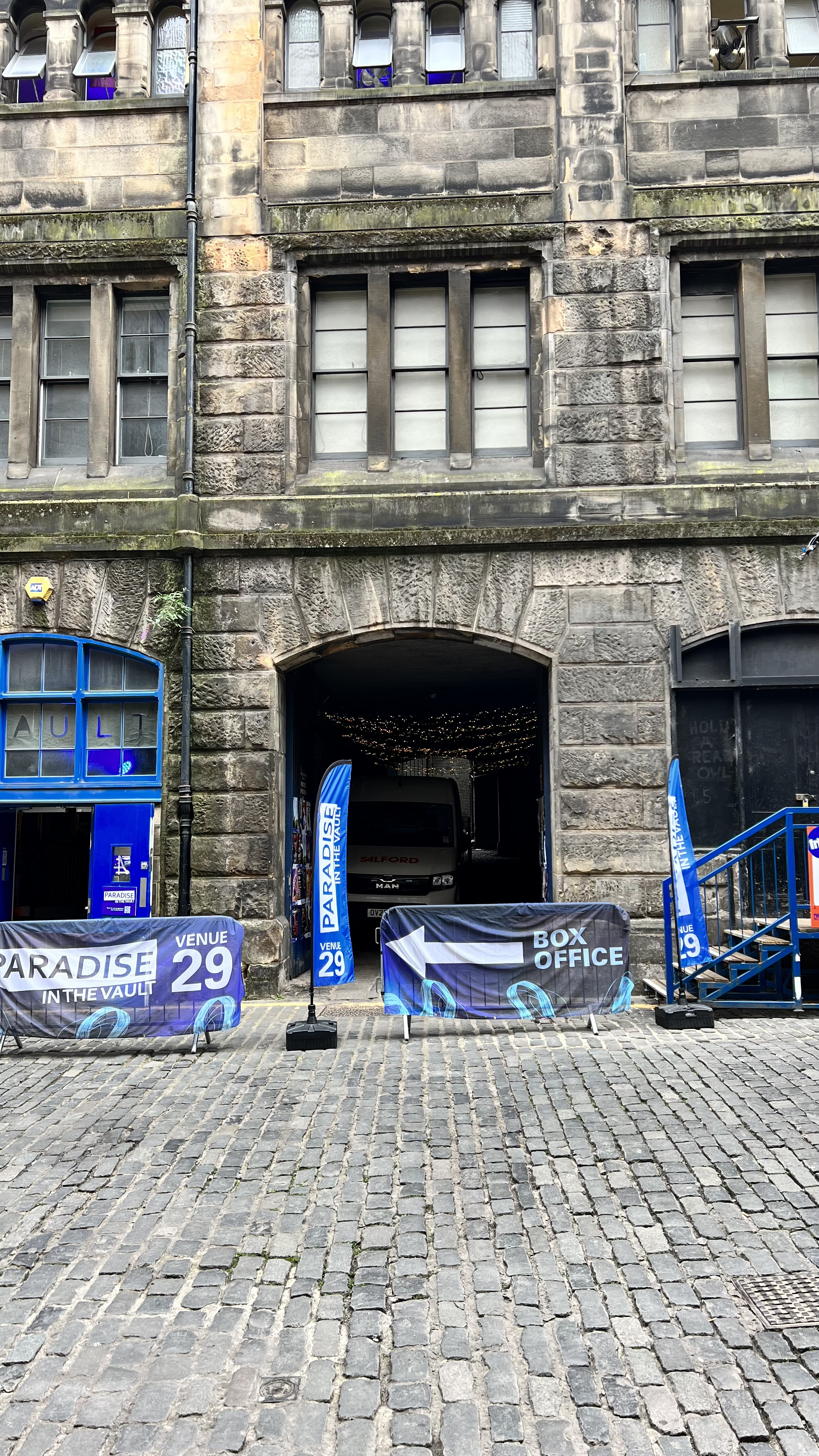
A pend on Merchant Street in Edinburgh for both vehicles and pedestrians

In Scotland, a pend is a passageway through a building, often from a street through to a courtyard or 'back court', and may be for both vehicles and pedestrian access or exclusively pedestrians.

The term "common pend" can often be found in descriptions of Scottish property for sale, such as "a common pend shared with the residential dwellings above".

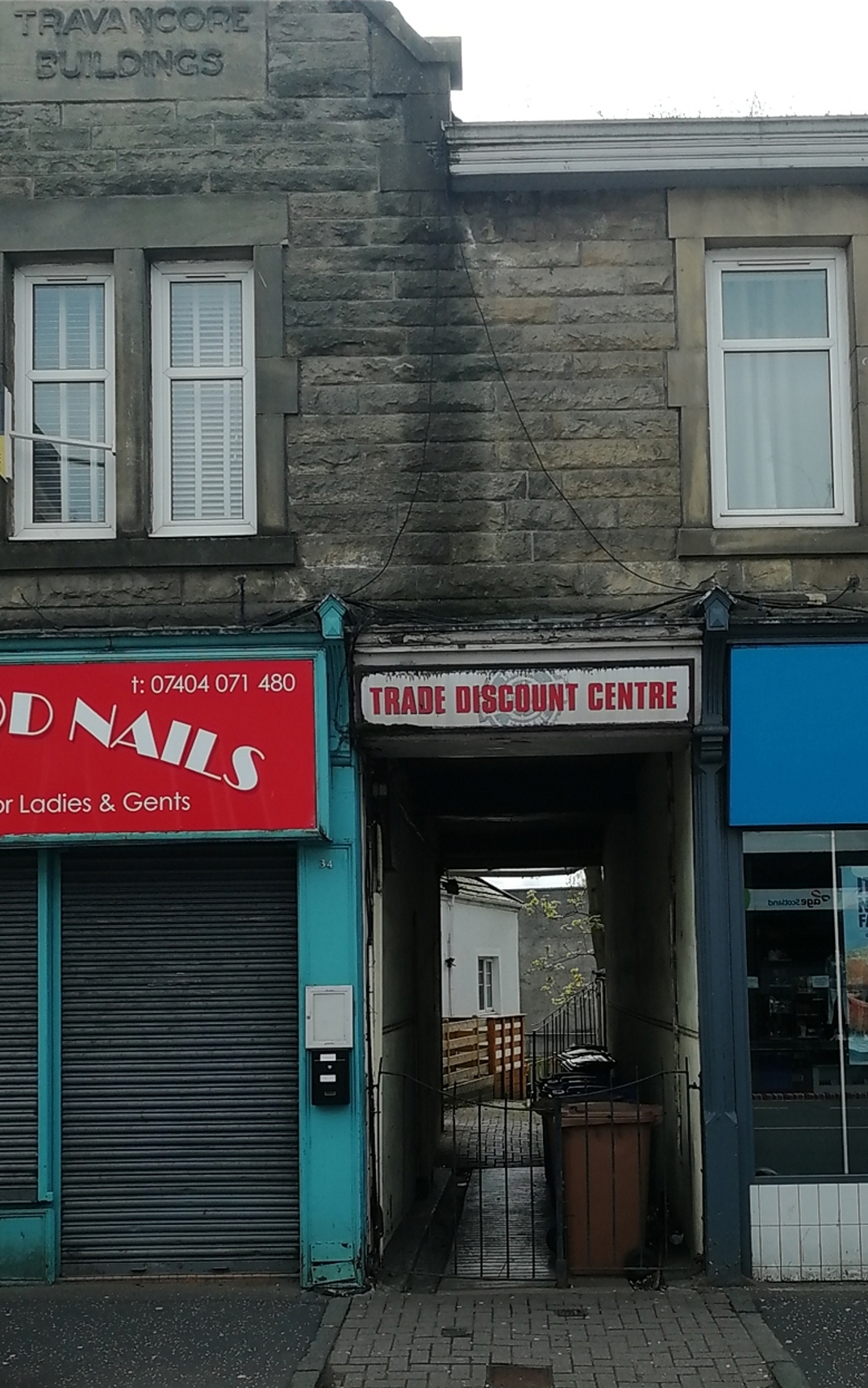
A typical pedestrian-only pend in Broxburn, West Lothian

A pend is distinct from a vennel or a close, as it has rooms directly above it, whereas vennels and closes tend not to be covered over and are typically passageways between separate buildings. However, a 'close' also means a common entry to multi-dwelling tenement properties in Scotland.

== Etymology ==
The OED suggests that the etymology of the word is probably related to the archaic verb pend – "arch, arch over, vault", this in turn being derived from the French pendre, Latin pendēre "to hang", from which also derives the word pendulum.

== See also ==
- Alley
- Gatehouse – Entry control building
- Ginnel – Narrow pathway or portal between houses
- Passage (architecture)
- Snickelway – Small streets and alleys in York, England
