= Passages =

Passages may refer to:

== Film and television ==
- Passages (1996 film), a Spanish crime thriller film
- Passages (2004 film), a Chinese drama film
- Passages (2008 film), a Canadian short documentary film
- Passages (2023 film), a French-German film
- "Passages" (Happy Days), a television episode

== Music ==
- Passages (Frank Gambale album) or the title song, 1994
- Passages (Jesus Jones album), 2018
- Passages (Justin Rutledge album) or the title song, 2019
- Passages (Ravi Shankar and Philip Glass album), 1990
- "Passages", a song by Kenny G from The Moment, 1996

== Other uses ==
- Passages Malibu, an addiction rehabilitation center in California
- Passages, a 1976 book by Gail Sheehy
- Passages, the daily newsletter aboard Regent Seven Seas Cruises

== See also ==
- Pasages (steam trawler)
- Passage (disambiguation)
