= Safe Passage =

Safe passage (German: Geleitrecht) is the escorting of travellers or goods in the Holy Roman Empire. Safe Passage may also refer to:

- Safe Passage (charity), a non-profit organization based in Yarmouth, Maine, U.S.A., supporting families in Guatemala City
- Safe Passage (film), a 1994 film (based on Ellyn Bache's novel) starring Susan Sarandon
- Palestinian freedom of movement#Gaza—West Bank Safe Passage, a safe route for Palestinians between Gaza and the West Bank
- The "Safe passage" provision of the Firearm Owners Protection Act

== See also ==
- Passage (disambiguation)
- Safe conduct, a document issued in time of war or conflict which grants passage to an enemy alien without harassment
