= Passage Island =

Passage Island may refer to:

- Passage Island (British Columbia)
- Passage Island (Tasmania)
- Falkland Islands
  - Passage Islands
  - Passage Island, Falkland Islands, Byron Sound
- Passage Islands, alternate name for the Spanish Virgin Islands
- Passage Island (Michigan)
- Passage Island (Andaman Islands)
