= Rite of passage (disambiguation) =

A rite of passage is a ritual that marks a change in a person's social or sexual status.

Rite(s) of passage may also refer to:

== Arts, entertainment, and media ==
=== Films ===
- Rites of Passage, a 1983 short film by Richard Stanley
- Rites of Passage (1999 film), a thriller starring Dean Stockwell
- Rites of Passage (2012 film), a thriller starring Wes Bentley
- Rites of Passage: The Rebirth of Combat Sports, a 2001 MMA documentary produced by Frederico Lapenda

=== Literature ===
- Rite of Passage (novel), a 1968 novel by Alexei Panshin
- Rite of Passage, a 1956 short fiction by Henry Kuttner and C. L. Moore
- Rite of Passage, a 1994 posthumously published novel by Richard Wright
- Rites of Passage (novel), a 1980 novel by William Golding and first part of the trilogy To the Ends of the Earth

=== Music ===
==== Albums ====
- Rites of Passage (Brother Ali album), 2000
- Rites of Passage (Roger Hodgson album), 1996
- Rites of Passage (Indigo Girls album), 1992
- Rites of Passage, the 1985 debut album of British band Vitamin Z

==== Other uses in music ====
- Rites of Passage (Sculthorpe), a 1972–73 music theatre work by Peter Sculthorpe
- "Rites of Passage", a song by Yanni from Ethnicity
- "A Rite of Passage", a song by Dream Theater from Black Clouds & Silver Linings

=== Television ===
- "Rite of Passage" (The Outer Limits)
- "Rite of Passage" (Shameless)
- "Rite of Passage" (Stargate SG-1)
- "Rites of Passage" (Dead Like Me)
- "Rites of Passage" (Goodnight Sweetheart)
- "Rites of Passage" (Married... with Children)
- "Rites of Passage" (Miami Vice)
- "Rites of Passage" (Superboy)
- "Rites of Passage" (Vikings)

=== Other uses in arts, entertainment, and media ===
- Rites of Passage (magazine), later the Transsexual News Telegraph, a 1991-2002 periodical covering issues related to transsexuality

== Other uses ==
- Rite of Passage (horse) (foaled 2004), a Thoroughbred racehorse
- Rites of Passage (educational program), an educational program on African American history

== See also ==
- "My Rite of Passage", an episode of the TV series Scrubs
- Right of passage, a maritime right to traverse an inner waterway
- Rite (disambiguation)
