= Abernethy Round Tower =

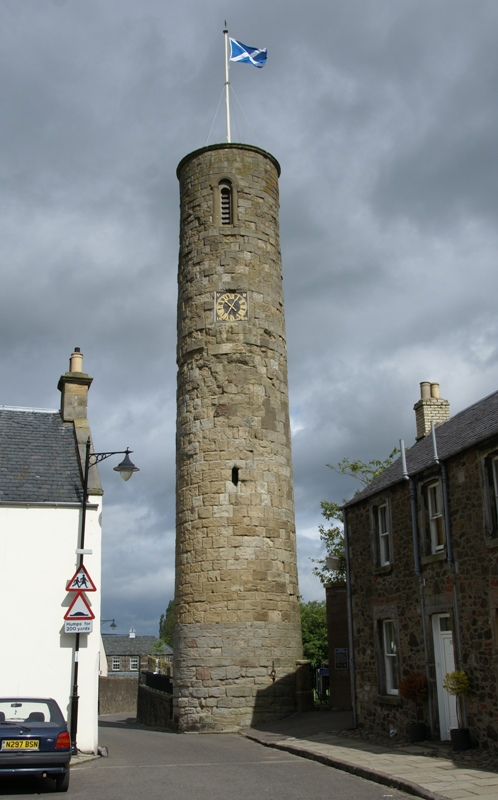
- The tower pictured in 2009
- Interactive map of the Abernethy Round Tower area

General information
- Architectural style: Irish round tower
- Location: School Wynd, Abernethy, Perth and Kinross, Scotland
- Coordinates: 56.332946°N 3.311737°W
- Construction started: 11th century
- Completed: 18th century
- Owner: Earl of Home (with guardianship by Historic Environment Scotland

Abernethy Round Tower is a stone-built Irish-style round tower which stands in School Wynd in Abernethy, Perthshire. It is one of two round towers in Scotland, alongside the tower at Brechin Cathedral.

The tower is located on the town's School Wynd within the village's cemetery alongside St Bride's parish church. Dating from the 11th century, the tower is protected as a scheduled monument.

== History ==
The tower is associated with the historic abbey or monastery in the village - previously held by Culdees and later by Augustinians before its dissolution in the mid-16th century. Remains of the abbey were still visible in the late 18th century but are now lost.

A plaque on the tower commemorates the site as the place where Malcolm III of Scotland paid homage to William the Conqueror in 1072, some six years after the Battle of Hastings, in the Treaty of Abernethy.

== Structure ==
The sandstone tower is 22.5 m (73 ft 10 in) high and has a diameter of 4.57 m (15 ft 0 in) at ground level, tapering upwards to 3.96 m (13 ft 0 in). The walls are 1.07 m (3 ft 6 in) thick. A viewing platform is at the top, open to the public in the summer.

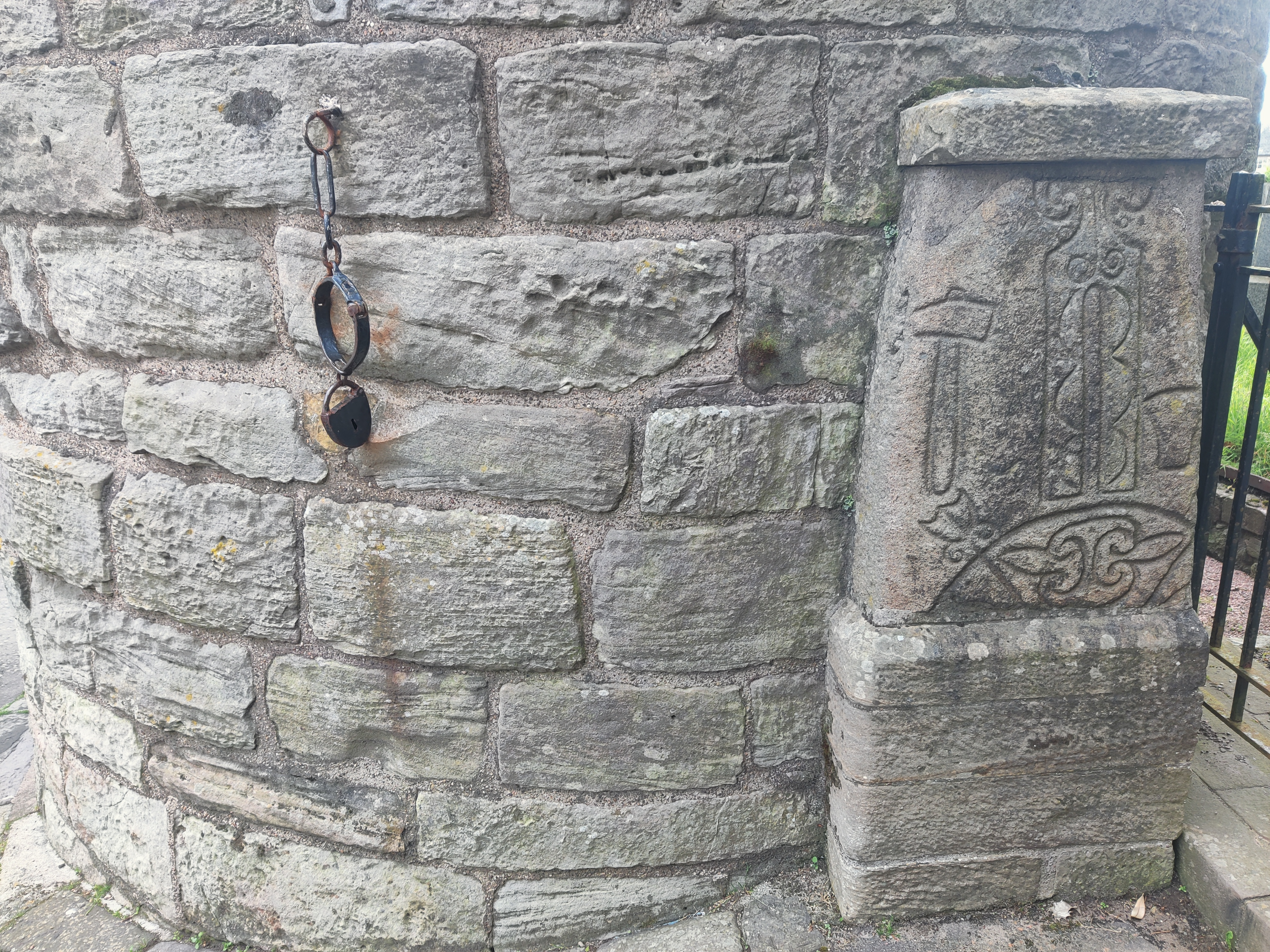
Pictish-symbol stone and jougs

The twelve lower layers are of a different coloured stone to the rest of the building, leading to speculation that the base was built earlier than the rest. There are indications that the tower originally had six wooden floors, probably connected by ladders. Fixed to the outside base of the tower is a Pictish stone; the tower also has an iron joug or pillory attached.

Various changes have been made to the tower over the years, including the installation of an iron spiral staircase when it became a lookout tower, windows and an outside clock. The current clock dates from 1868 - bearing the initials of Queen Victoria. A flagpole with a salmon finial references a traditional industry of the town.
