= Economy of Scotland in the High Middle Ages =

The economy of Scotland in the High Middle Ages for this article, is the economic situation in Scotland between 1058 and 1286 AD. The year 1058 saw the ascension of Malcolm III to the throne of Scotland. His reign marks a significant cultural, economic, and political shift away from Scandinavia and towards England and the European Continent – most noticeable in his marriage to Margaret, the sister of Edgar Aetheling, who was the primary dynastic rival to William I, Duke of Normandy, for the throne of England following the Norman Conquest of England in 1066. The end of this period is marked by the death of Alexander III in 1286, which then led indirectly to the Scottish Wars of Independence. This period corresponds roughly with the High Middle Ages in Europe, which is generally ascribed to the 11th to the 13th centuries and the Medieval Warm Period, which directly affected the Scottish agrarian economy.

== Political geography ==
The Kingdom of Scotland was not identical to its modern geographical boundaries. Rather, the period is marked by further domination of Scottish hinterlands. During Malcolm III's reign, the lands he directly controlled consisted of the Lowlands north of the Firth of Forth, as well as the regions of Lothian and Cumbria, though forced to perform homage to the King of England for these lands until the conclusion of the Scottish Wars of Independence. Although the Scottish monarchy held nominal lordship over Moray, Galloway, and parts of the Western Isles, these supposed vassals often acted irrespective or in direct opposition to Scottish interests. In addition, the Earls of Orkney and Caithness often performed homage to both the King of Scotland and the King of Norway, which demonstrates the limited authority Scotland held over the mainland and outer islands.

However, the period from Malcolm III to Alexander III sees the effective expansion of the Scottish kings’ power over the rival centers and the implementation of royal authority. David I and Alexander II are perhaps the most visible examples of this expansion – with their imposition of new regional lords in the Moray, Galloway, and Argyll – but there was a consistent progression towards greater unity and control.

== Feudalism ==
As mentioned above, this period in Scottish history marks a cultural, economic, and political shift toward Continental institutions, practices, and relationships. The most notable of these is the introduction of a more formalized version of Feudalism. Generally speaking, feudalism was the structuring of society based upon hierarchical relationships whereby the holding of land was exchanged in return for service, generally military, or labor. In addition to military service or labor, the lord would require dues, in either coinage, as is generally the case between the monarch and his vassals, or in-kind payment – which was the standard between a lord and the peasantry. In Scotland, this payment was referred to as cáin. The cáin was generally paid in the form of the area's main produce. The term denotes both the regular exaction of an area's revenue by the king, like the Scottish king's exaction of payment in the Southern Uplands, as well as irregular tribute to a superior authority, as was the case in Moray during its period of quasi-independence prior to the mid-11th century.

=== Lord-vassal relationship ===
This system was heavily reliant upon personal relationships and oaths of fealty to maintain political authority and economic domination. Relationships were often left vague when royal authority was limited. For example, the Scottish Crown maintained only loose authority over the Earls of Galloway until Alan, Earl of Galloway, died in 1234 with no legitimate male heir, and Alexander III divided the inheritance among royal supporters with weak familial ties to the earldom.

This ambiguity generally supported greater stability at the expense of the royal treasury, as the cáin was collected infrequently, if at all. Scotland and England's relationship was performed in much the same way. The Scottish kings performed homage to the English king for royal lands in Cumbria and Lothian except during periods of English strength or Scottish weakness. For example, the Scottish king William the Lion swore fealty to Henry II of England in 1175 as stipulated in the Treaty of Falaise, which explicitly declared William held all of Scotland as a fief. However, even during these periods of English supremacy, payment was exacted more as tribute for peace than vassalage dues. Richard Oram describes the terms of treaty and their “light touch,” emphasizing the limited economic impact on Scotland: “Henry also demanded control of royal castles in Lothian – Berwick, Jedburgh, Roxburgh, Edinburgh and Stirling, but sought neither men nor money for his wars, nor did he hear appeals from Scottish law courts”.

However, this period of ambiguity between the Scottish monarch and his vassals gradually became more formalized during the 11th, 12th, and 13th centuries as the Crown asserted greater political authority over mainland Scotland. In Moray, for instance, David I drew the troublesome district into his direct sphere through claiming of castles as royal property and the settling of English nobility explicitly loyal the king, and not local ties in mid-12th century.

=== Criticisms of Feudal Terminology ===
In spite of the fact that most historians agree that from the 11th century through the 13th marks at minimum a greater formalization of feudalistic hierarchical relationships and structures, the wholesale adoption of the classic manorial feudalism as an explanation for Scottish rural economy has been widely criticized. A. D. M. Barrell points out that unlike in England, where the Norman Conquest enabled the monarchy to redefine societal relationships through the major expropriation of native lords, Scotland was never conquered. Therefore, the settlers introduced into Scotland were on top of existing socio-economic structures forcing the new population to tread carefully over established practices. In addition, Susan Reynolds pointed out that land was not held as a grant from the king, but rather engaged in military service and paid taxes commiserate with their economic and societal standing. Another obstacle frequently used to limit the applicability of feudal terminology to Scotland during this period was the relative importance of pastoralism, especially in the Northern and Western Highlands, over sedentary farming. The inability to tie the peasantry to the land in much of Scotland, like in England, limited the lord's ability to extract economic resources and exert political control over from the peasantry.

== Agriculture ==
Significant inroads were being made in Scottish agricultural practices during the High Middle Ages. This can partly be attributed to the Medieval Warm Period. This climatic change resulted in warmer, drier conditions throughout Northern Europe. Farming in Scotland therefore could be expanded into higher altitudes that were previously too cold for agriculture and valleys that were prone to floods or marsh conditions. The expansion of agricultural production capability was accompanied by improvements in labor saving technologies that increased crop yields and pastoral output. These included the carruca-type plough, which was more effective at plowing tougher soil, improved animal harnesses that shortened the time required for clearance in woodlands, and water mills that “freed more time and concomitantly more labor... which could then be applied to other activities.” These factors in congruence directly led to the expansion of agriculture into new areas and the intensification of existing arable lands that increased annual yields and indirectly caused an increase in population.

=== Assarts ===
In practice, this expansion into new lands manifested itself in the form of assarts. Assarts were lands that were newly cultivated from land formerly considered ‘waste.’ There were several different versions of the expansion. The reclamation of valleys prone to flooding and planting at higher altitudes due to the warmer and drier climate have already been mentioned.

Another substantial method of exploitation was the gradual push into forests. Forests were areas under the direct control of the king typically used for hunting and under special jurisdiction. Although the forest law in Scotland was noticeably more lax than England, much of it was still restricted from agricultural production. It is worth clarifying that the forest considered ‘waste’ does not directly compare with modern usage of the term. This is not to say that these lands were completely absent of production. Richard Oram identifies the value of these regions to local inhabitants: “the afforested area was exploited routinely by the inhabitants of the settlements that lined its margins, as summer pasture for cattle and sheep, a source of autumn pannage for pigs and of winter feed for the livestock left unslaughtered in November, and for building materials and fuel”.

During this period the monarchy acquiesced to the forests, especially in the lands more suitable for planting of cereals, to be made available for cultivation. This contributed to a slow transition from pastoralism to plant-based agriculture, but only in limited areas. Indeed, the pastoral economy experienced much of the same growth that landed cultivation enjoyed from the warming climate, as higher altitudes became suitable for grazing. However, there remained significant competition between the competing industries for land use throughout highlands and lowlands, alike.

=== Pastoralism ===
Although the planting of cereals was becoming increasingly common in the Lowlands, its impact on much of Scotland was relatively unsubstantial to the overall economic output. Herding of animals remained primary means of subsistence and the most important form of agriculture for most of the Scottish mainland. Only about 40% of total land area was below 500 feet above sea level, compared to 78% in England. This meant that a majority of Scotland was less profitable for plant-based agriculture compared to animal husbandry. Economic historian Bruce Campbell explains that the impact of pastoral agriculture is somewhat muted in the historical record that relies on parish churches for wealth statistics, “because tithes on [animal] products were less straightforward to collect.” Even in areas that would be more suitable for farming were slow to transform. Galloway for instance, in the words of G. W. S. Barrow, “already famous for its cattle, was so overwhelming pastoral, that there is little evidence in that region of land under permanent cultivation, save along the Solway coast”.

== Trade ==
=== Burghs ===
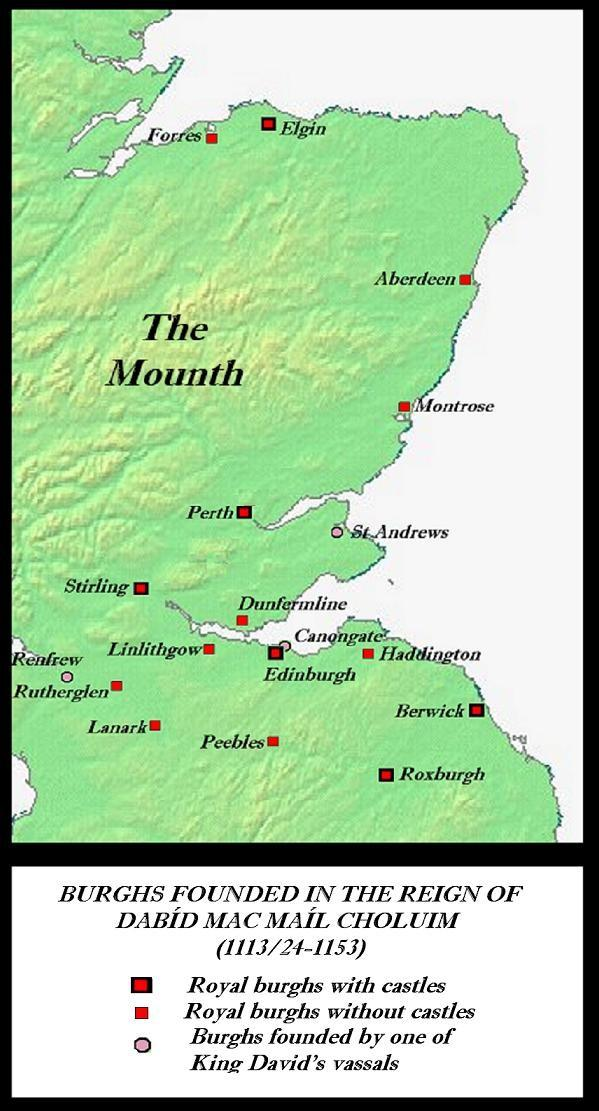
Burghs founded before the death of King David I

Scottish trade during the High Middle Ages was largely centered around the “burgh” or “burgess.” These burghs enjoyed a variety of privileges, but most fundamental to their existence was the monopoly on the buying and selling of goods within its given territory. Although there existed limited trading settlements prior to the 11th century, verified by the excavations at Whithorn, the granting of burgh status strongly incentivized the growth of towns.

David I was the most prolific king at awarding this burgh status to various trading centers and his successor, William the Lion, followed suit. By the end of David's reign in 1153 there were seventeen burghs, and by William's death in 1214 there were forty recorded burghs. Of these newly created burghs, Berwick-upon-Tweed was the largest, most successful and most influential and remained so until the Scottish Wars of Independence.

These burghs provided tangible benefits to the crown as well as boosting overall trade. The king benefited financially in three ways: royal monopolies, tolls, and burgess rents. The first method, royal monopolies, enabled the crown to sell or grant the rights for exclusive distribution of goods within the burgh's proscribed boundary. The second key method of boosting revenue was the collection of tolls. These taxes were placed upon goods purchased in a burgh's hinterland – as only the burgh itself was toll-free – and enforced by inhabitants of the outlying areas were forced to buy and sell solely through the burgh. However, this was often difficult to enforce, and therefore the crown often relied upon burgess rents to compensate. The burgesses paid the rents, also known as ferme, annually to the king in exchange for maintaining their status. Together, these revenue-boosting methods were the primary cash income for the Scottish crown.

Some historians have speculated that David's expansion of burgh status was partly motivated by the desire to open up Scotland to wider international trade networks. During this period, Flanders was experiencing a boom in the cloth industry motivated improvements in weaving production. This in turn increased demand for wool, which Scotland produced in abundance. In spite of England's dominance of the market, Scotland was able to share in the spoils of the boom – partly due to its utilization of colonists, whether Flemish, English, or French, that supplied capital and expertise into an underdeveloped industry.

=== Money supply ===
This period of Scottish history also marked the profound growth of the money supply within Scotland. The initial cause of the growth of the money supply was domestic factors. A silver mining boom in northern England enabled David I to develop Scotland's first minted coins. The increase in available capital helped fuel commercial development, especially in Scotland and England, which gained directly from the mines in the Pennines. However, even when the mines were exhausted of silver, the current account surplus enabled the money supply to continue growing. “During the thirteenth century, a positive and reciprocal relationship therefore existed between the growth of overseas trade, expansion of the money supplies, and advance of commercialization,” describes economic historian Bruce Campbell.

== Catholic Church ==
As the only pan-European organization the Catholic Church commanded both spiritual and temporal power during the High Middle Ages. One of the key manifestations of this power was its important role in the economic affairs of a state. These represent a significant portion of Scotland's overall economy due to the ten percent tithe paid by the faithful, their occasional role as temporal lord within the feudal system, and the production of land owned by the parish. Their economic situation was further supplemented, by the fact that in most cases the parishes enjoyed a tax-exempt status from the state. In many ways, the Church acts as both a driver of economic growth and an indicator of it, through the availability of tax records that have survived.

Economic historian Bruce Campbell estimates the total number of ecclesiastical parishes at around 960 in 1290. The wealth of these parishes varied significantly. Some village parishes existed on subsistence levels similar to the peasantry, while the large dioceses were considered nobles in all but name. For instance, the dioceses of St. Andrews and Glasgow had estimated total assets of £13,724 and £11,144, respectively in 1290. These two dioceses alone account for almost two thirds of total spiritual and temporal assets of the Catholic Church in Scotland.

== Overall assessment ==
By the end of the 13th century, Scotland remained highly rural with a significantly smaller and on average poorer population than its southern neighbor. However, significant strides towards a stronger economy were taken during this period: the formalization of feudal relationships and expansion of the Scottish monarchy allowed for greater exploitation of agricultural production – pastoral and plant-based, the Medieval Warm Period and relaxation of forest law generated agricultural expansion into new fields and pastures, and the introduction of burghs enabled the initial urbanization and opened Scotland to international trade. Campbell succinctly sums up the state of the Scottish economy at the end of the High Middle Ages compared to Ireland, which possessed a similar geographic size and population: “On the eve of the War of Independence the Scottish economy was larger, commercially more dynamic, and more monetized than that of Ireland and, in the speed with which its money supply was growing, bears favourable comparison with its far larger and, in aggregate, wealthier southern neighbour, England.”
