= Ginnel =

Narrow pathway or portal between houses

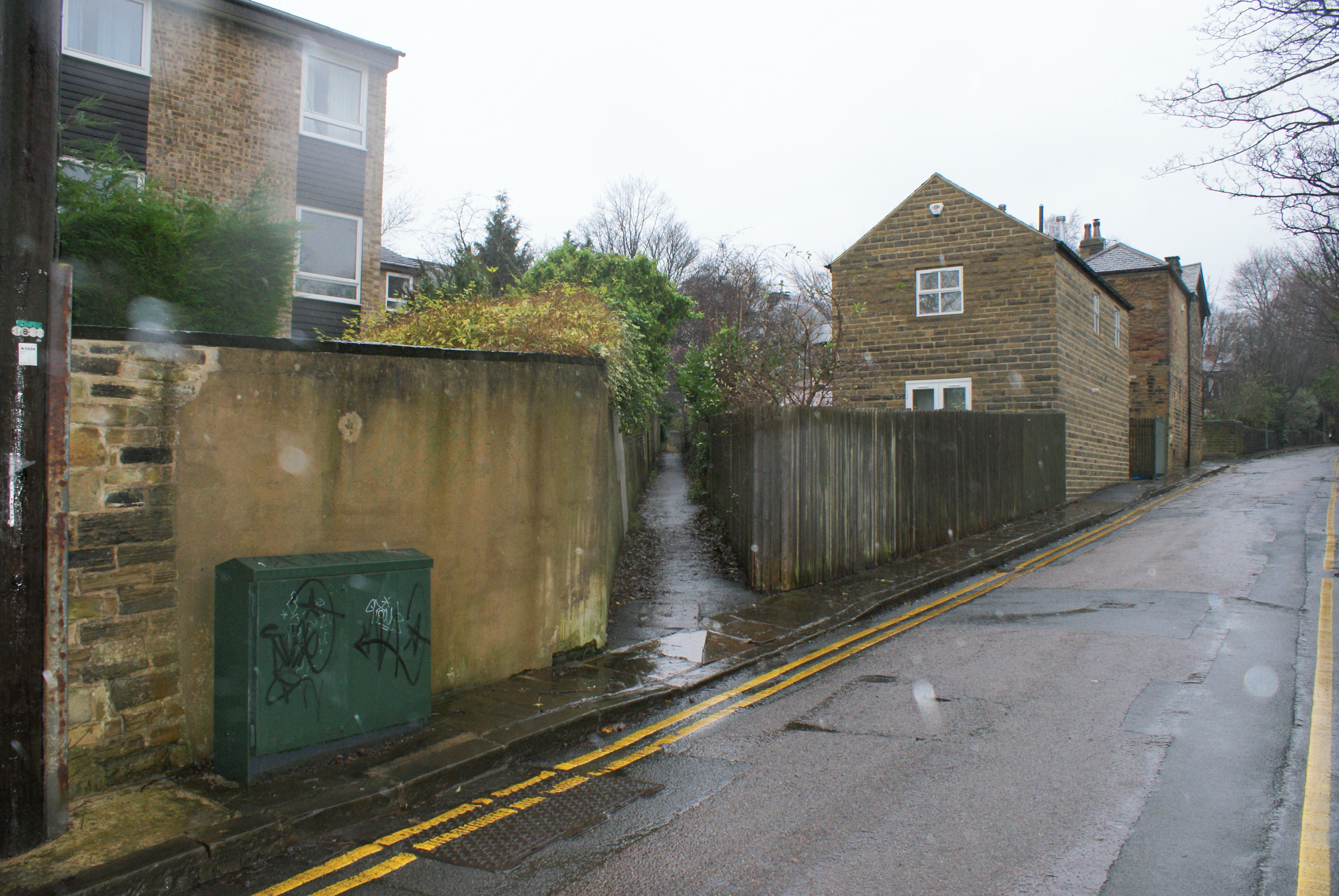
Leeds, England

A ginnel is a word in various Scottish and northern English dialects describing a fenced or walled alley between residential buildings that provides a pedestrian shortcut to nearby streets. Ginnels are typically found in suburban areas, and do not contain any business premises, unlike some other types of alley. Other related terms include snicket, tenfoot and snickelway.

Suburban streets in Sydney, Australia and Auckland, New Zealand similarly feature "cut-throughs", which are fenced or walled passages found between residential lots that grant pedestrians easy access to nearby facilities situated on other roads. These pedestrian walkways or portals may feature a nature strip and are generally secured by bollards to prevent vehicle access.

== Origins ==
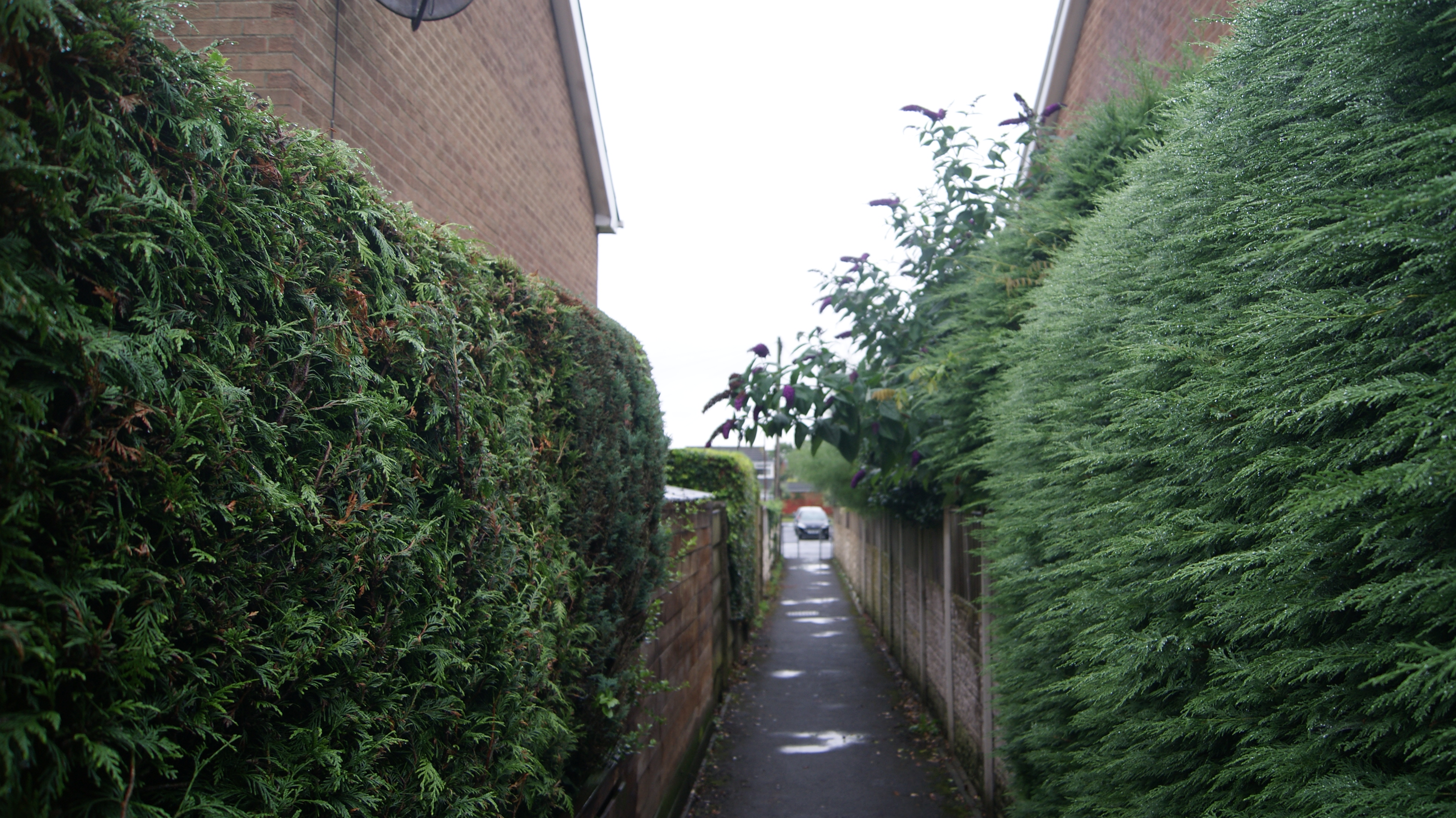
Wetherby, England

The earliest recorded use of the word was in 1613.

In 1744, pharmacist Arthur Jessop wrote a subpoena that mentioned Joseph Eastwood's wife in the "Ginnil" in the Low at Holmfirth in the West Riding of Yorkshire. A subdivision of the Taylor family was said to be of Ginnel in Meltham in 1774. In most works, there is no broad distinction drawn between ginnel and snicket, and the two have been used interchangeably.

Both are described as north-country words for a narrow entrance between houses. However, in the Holme Valley, it has been said that a ginnel goes uphill and has setts whereas a snicket does not, and is surrounded by vegetation. "Ginnel" is a dialect word from Yorkshire, UK, which appeared in dialect dictionaries in the 19th century.

=== Etymology ===
The Oxford English Dictionary states that its etymology is vague, though it compares the word to 'channel' (including being a corruption of it), and says it is 'a long, narrow passage between houses, either roofed or unroofed'. In The English Dialect Dictionary it is differentiated with 'entry', and is said to feature a roof, unlike a ginnel. Furthermore, editors of some Yorkshire glossaries asserted a connection between ginnel and a Scandinavian word for 'mouth', on the analogy of an opening.

According to Collins English Dictionary, a snicket is 'a passageway between walls or fences', and a ginnel is 'a narrow passageway between or through buildings'.

== Gallery ==
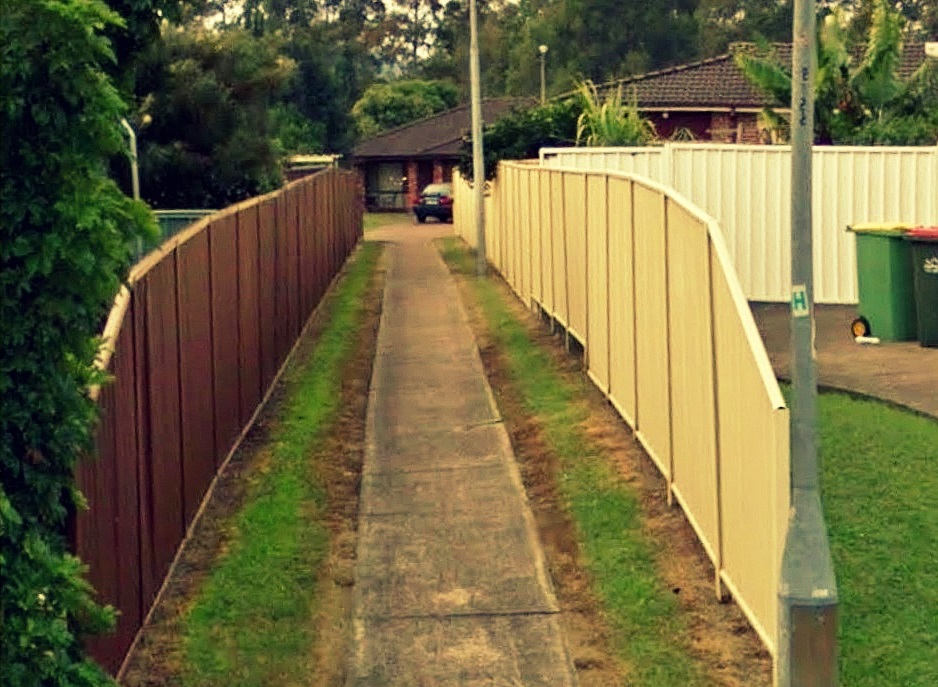
A "cut-through" in Western Sydney, Australia

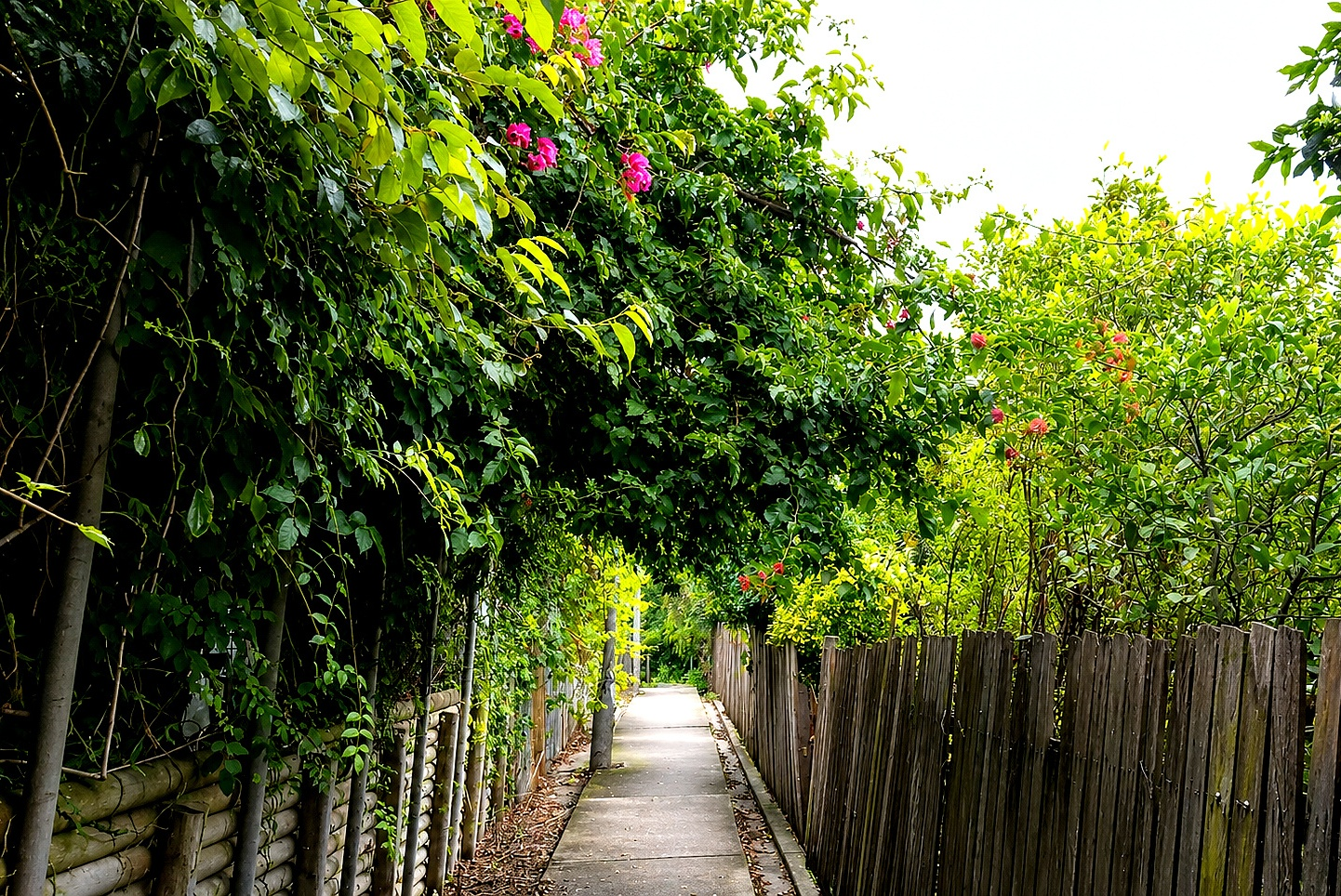
A walkway in Casula, Australia, bordered by fences and dense vegetation

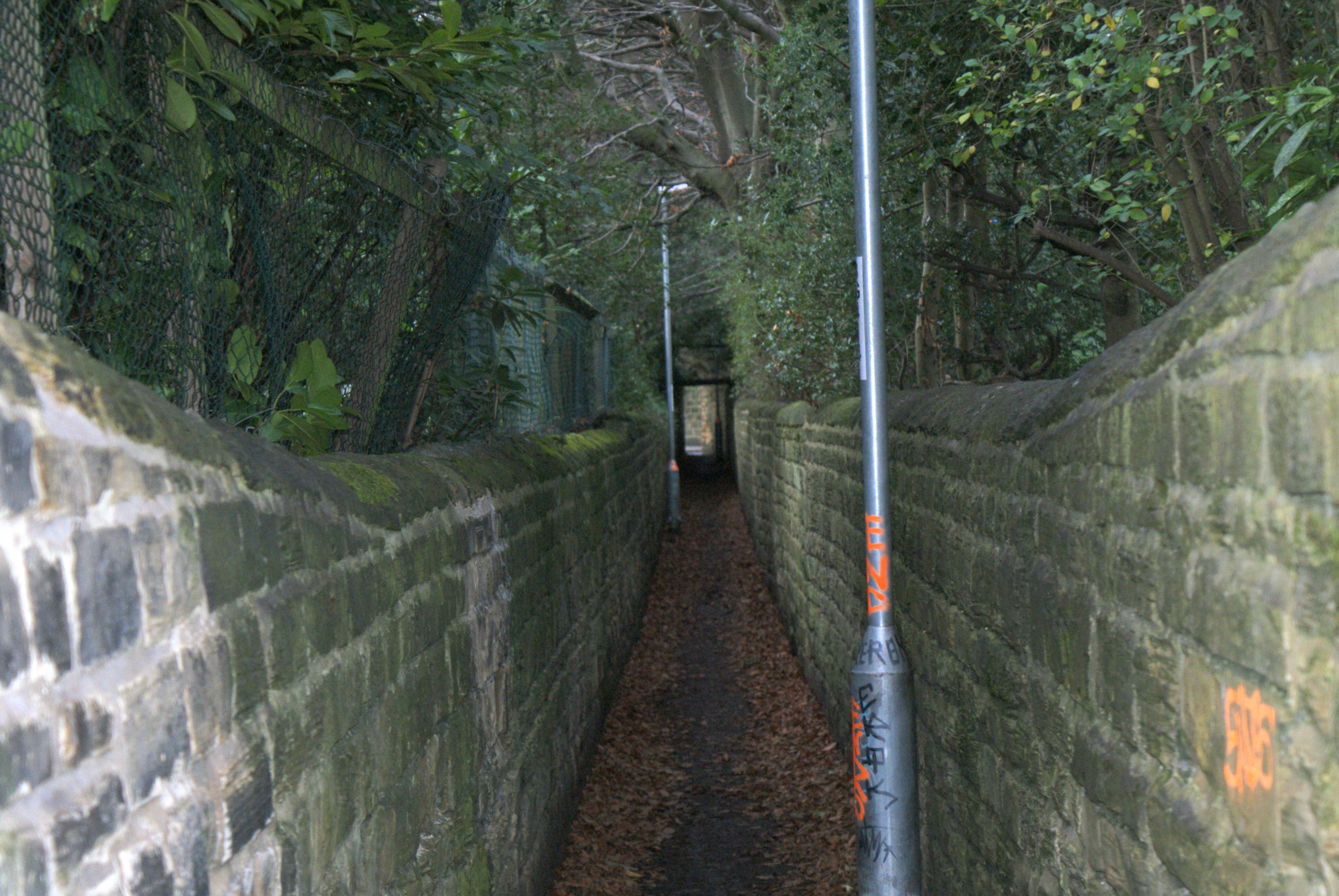
A narrow, bricked ginnel in Leeds

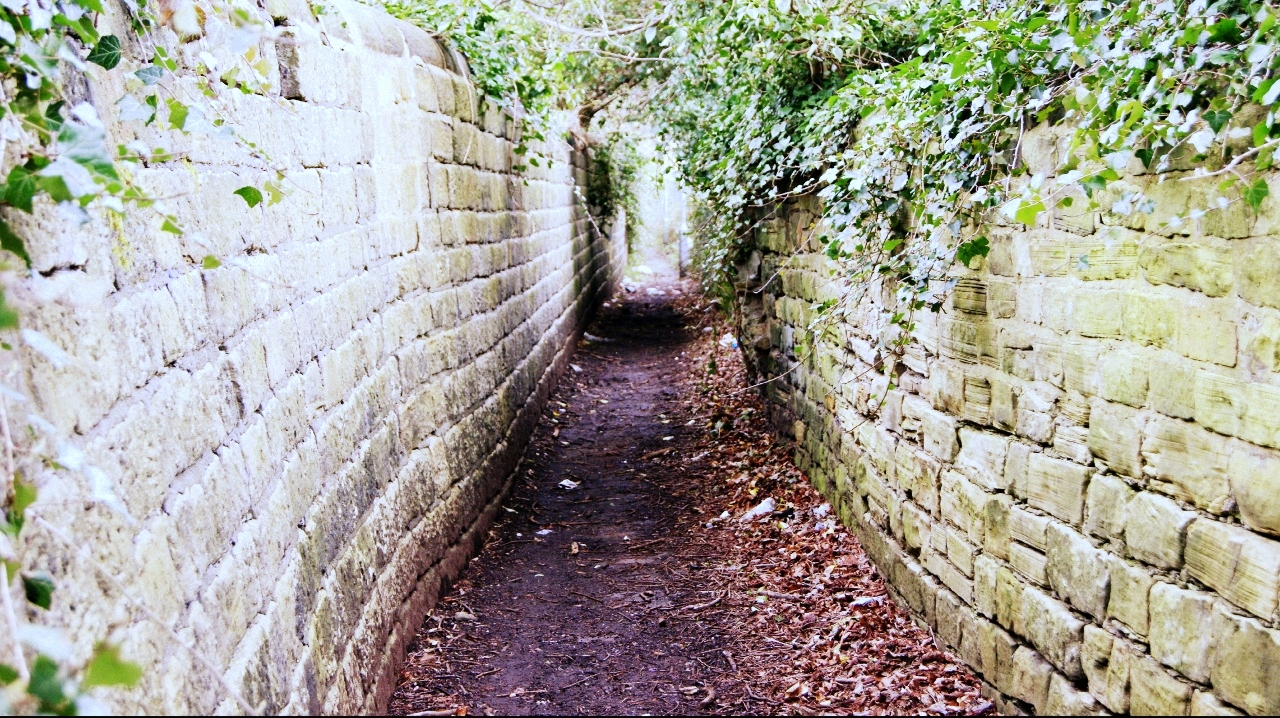
A ginnel surrounded by English Ivy

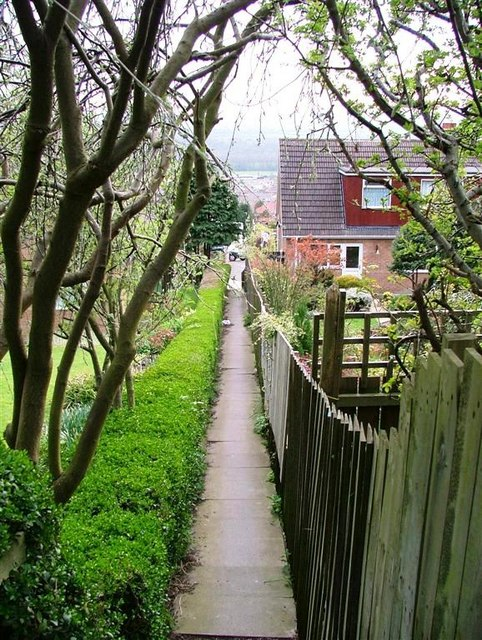
In Brotton

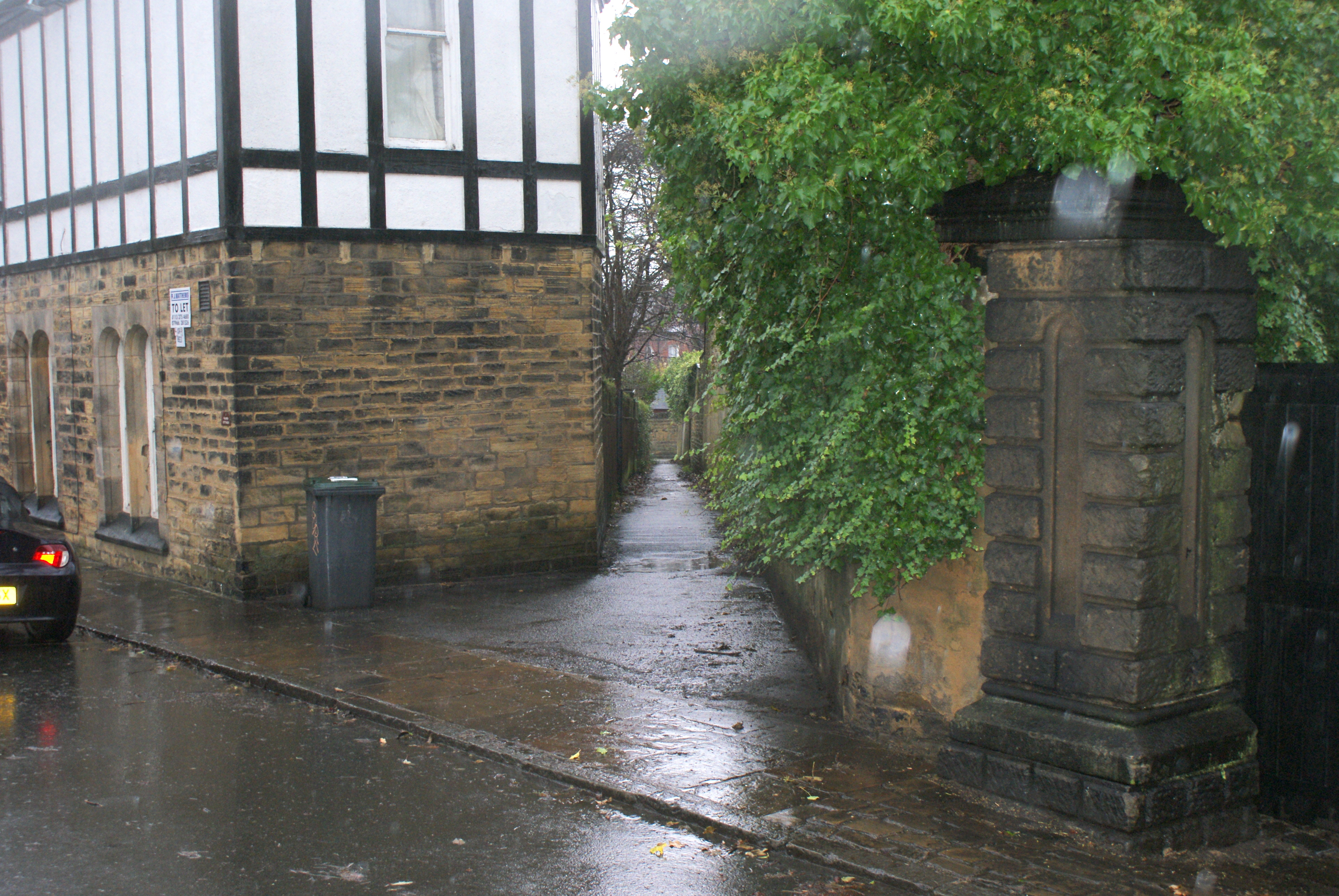

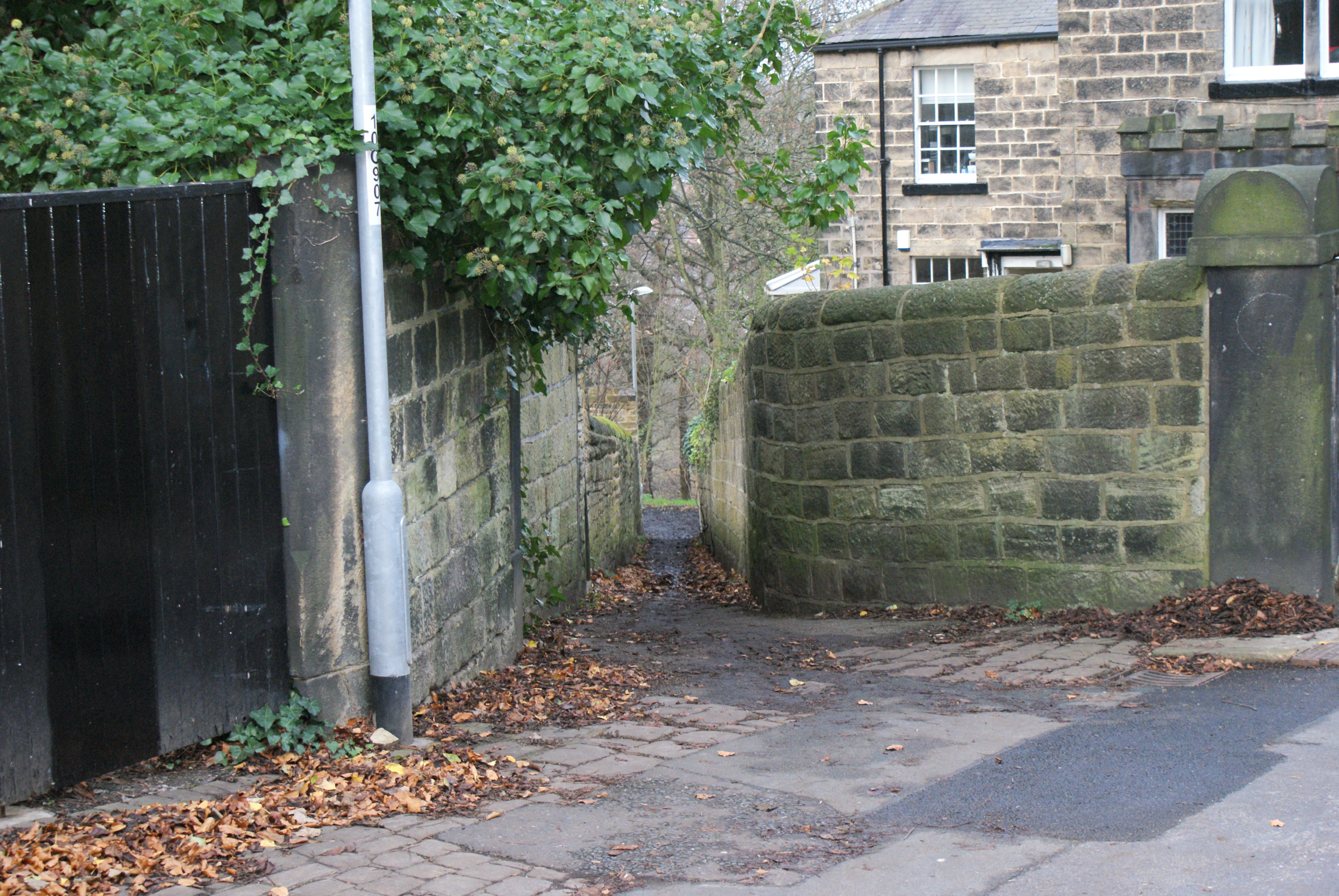

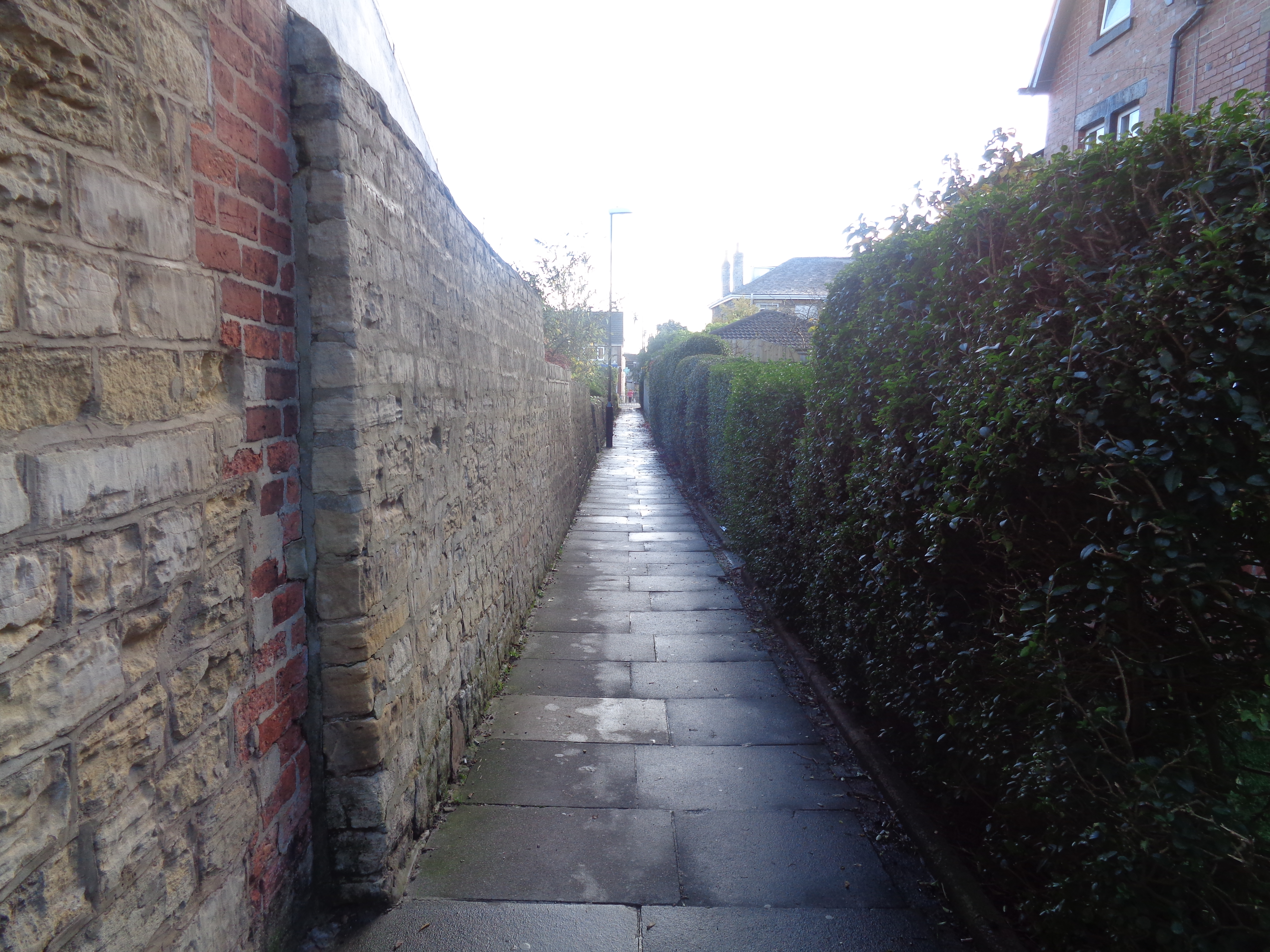

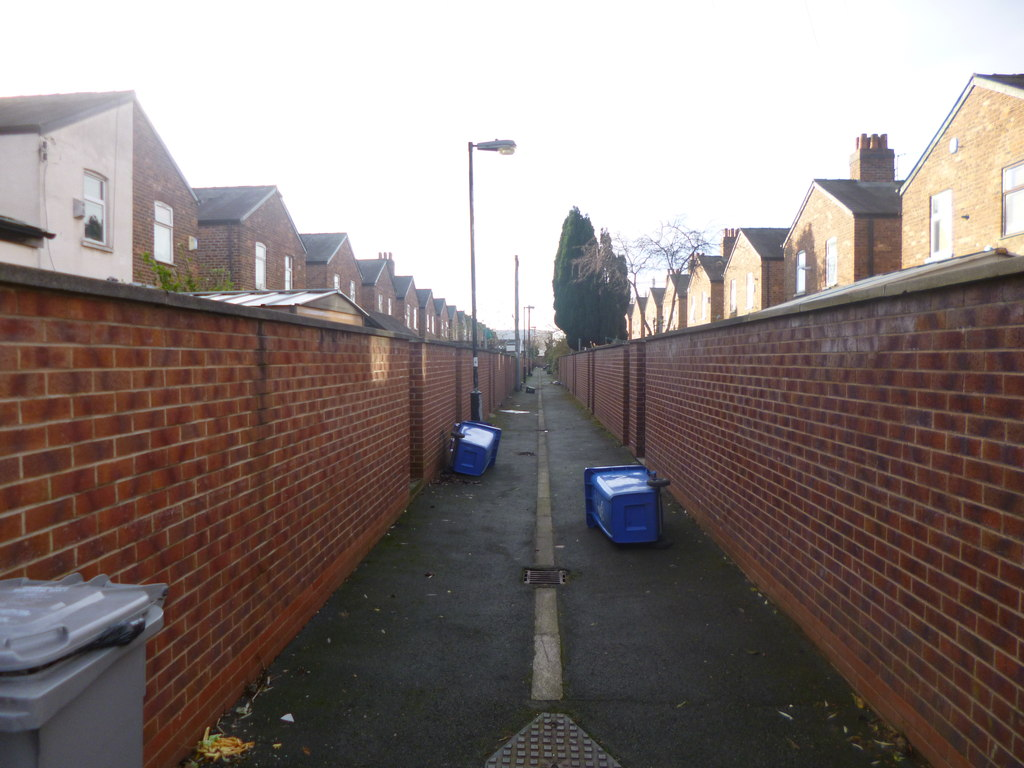

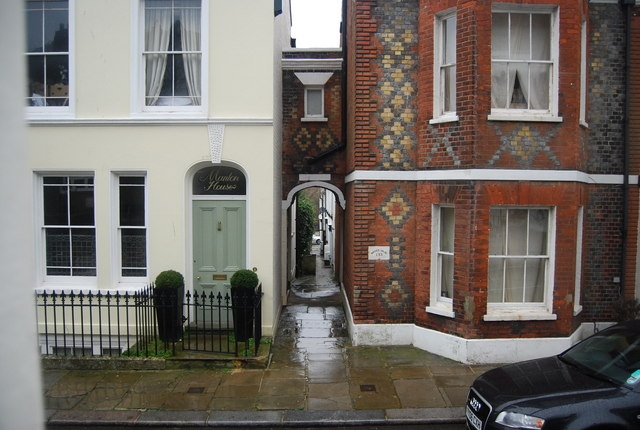

== See also ==
- Pend
- Vennel
- Wynd
- Easement
- Cut-through driving
