= Wire gate =

Wire gate or wiregate may refer to:

- Hampshire gate
- A carabiner locking mechanism
- NSA warrantless surveillance (2001–2007), nicknamed "Wiregate"

== See also ==
- Wiergate, Texas
