= Gate =

Point of entry to a space enclosed by walls

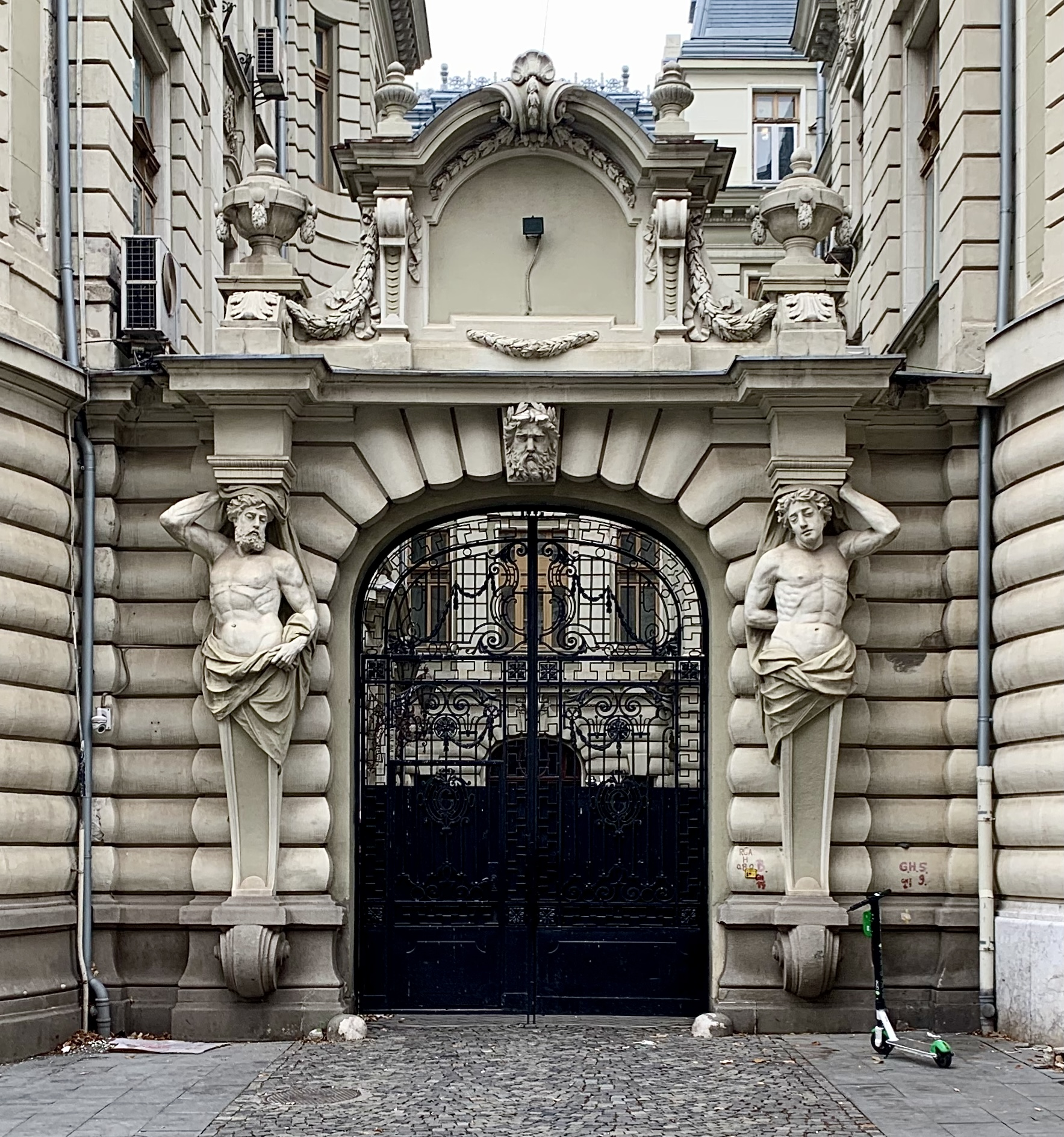
Gate from Bucharest (Romania)

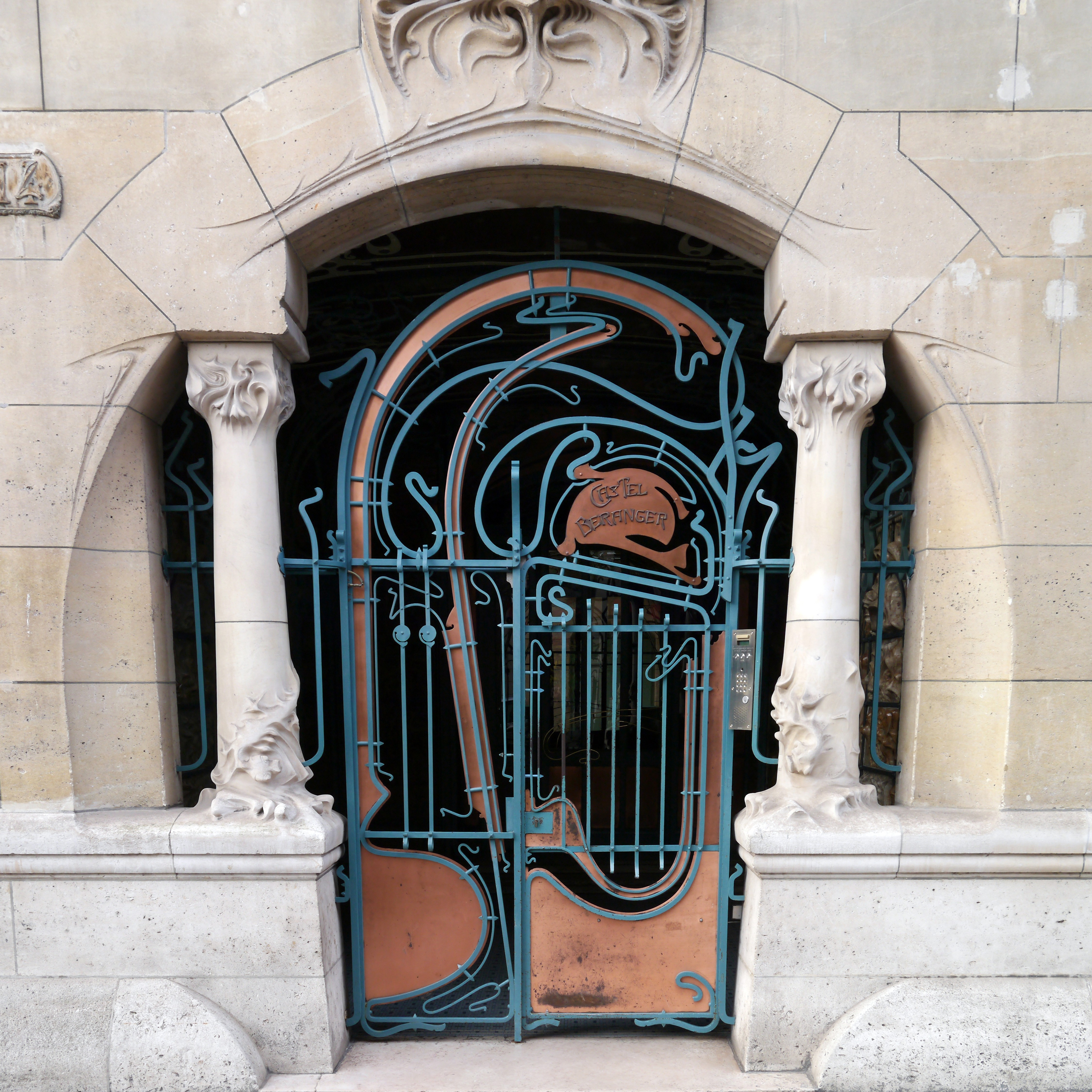
Art Nouveau gate of Castel Béranger (Paris)

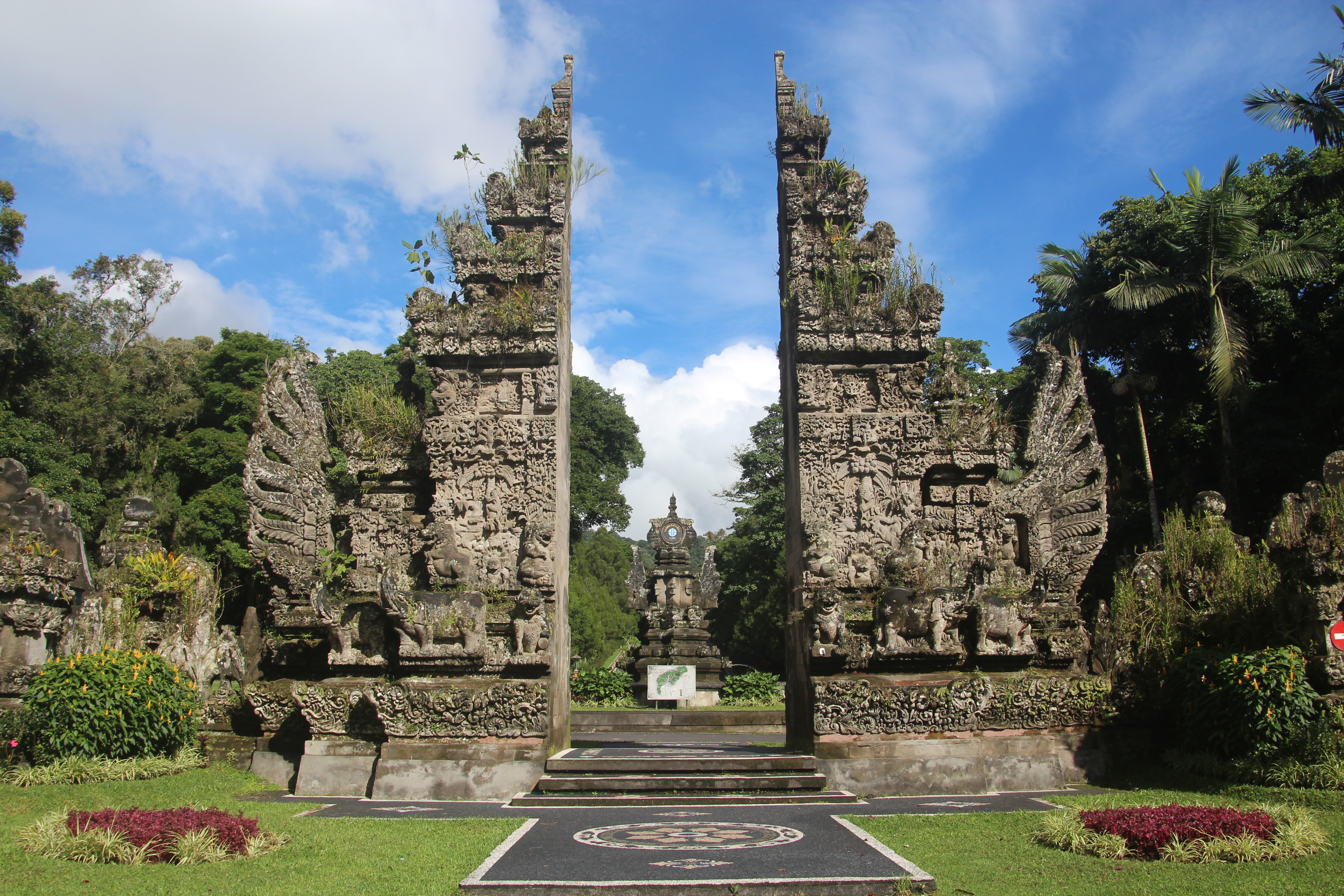
Candi bentar, a typical Indonesian gate that is often found on the islands of Java and Bali

A gate or gateway is a point of entry to or from a space enclosed by walls or other barriers. The word is derived from Proto-Germanic *gatan, meaning an opening or passageway. Synonyms include portal. The concept originally referred to the gap or hole in the wall or fence, rather than a barrier which closed it. Gates may prevent or control the entry or exit of individuals, or they may be merely decorative. The moving part or parts of a gateway may be considered "doors", as they are fixed at one side whilst opening and closing like one.

A gate might have a latch that can be raised and lowered to both open a gate or prevent it from swinging. Gate operation can be either automated or manual. Locks are also used on gates to increase security.

Larger gates can be used for a whole building, such as a castle or fortified town. Doors can also be considered gates when they are used to block entry as prevalent within a gatehouse.

== Types of gate ==
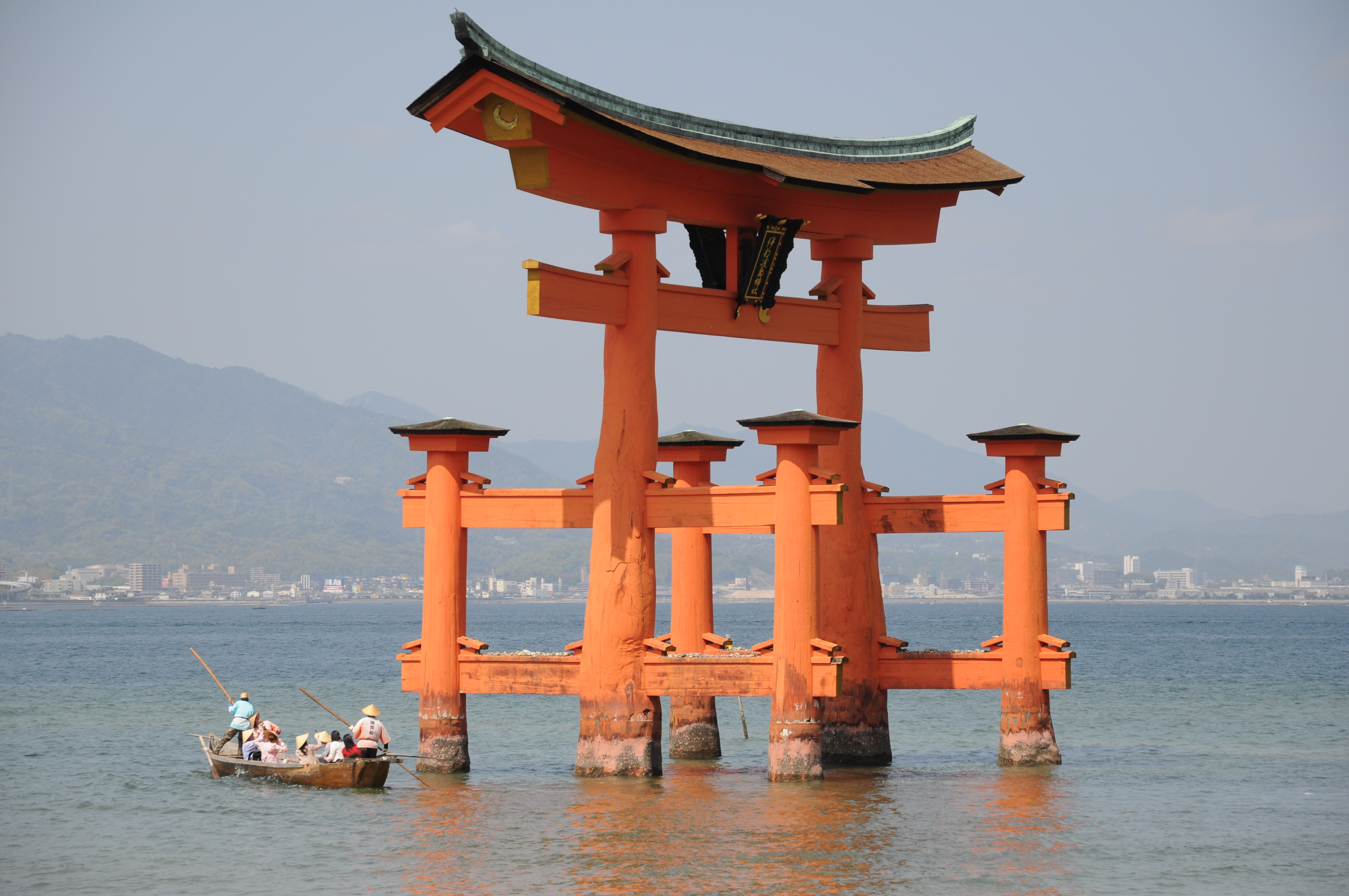
Japanese Torii at Itsukushima Shrine, a UNESCO World Heritage Site in Japan, where the Hindu goddess Saraswati is worshipped as the Buddhist-Shinto goddess Benzaiten

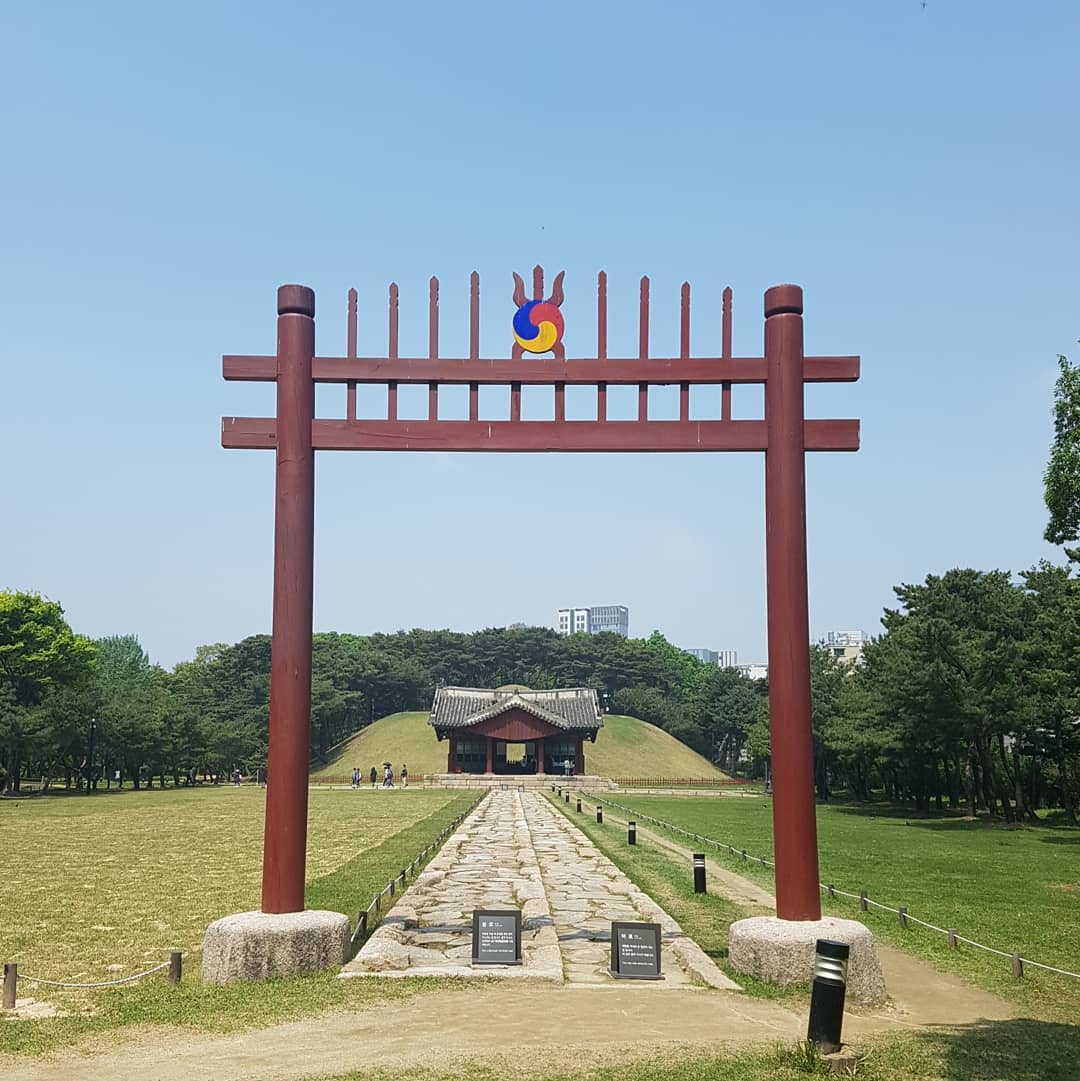
Korean Hongsalmun at Seonjeongneung

- Baby gate: a safety gate to protect babies and toddlers
- Badger gate: gate to allow badgers to pass through rabbit-proof fencing
- Hampshire gate (a.k.a. New Zealand gate, wire gate, etc.)
- Kissing gate on a footpath
- Lychgate, a roofed structure at the entrance to a churchyard
- Mon Japanese: gate. The religious torii compares to the Chinese pailou (paifang), Indian torana, Indonesian Paduraksa and Korean hongsalmun. Mon are widespread in Japanese gardens.
- In fortification, a gate (such as that to a castle or fort, or a city gate) may be contained within a larger gatehouse structure, to make it more secure and imposing. Specific types of gate were used to resist assault, including portcullises (descending grilles) and yetts (iron grilles on hinges, of the same linguistic origin as "gate"). A defensive gate was generally secured with a drawbar, and could include iron reinforcement. Fortified gates may be additionally protected with outer defences like barbicans and drawbridges, and have openings in the surrounding structure (such as machicolations, murder holes or arrowslits) through which defenders could shoot at assailants.
- Race gate used for checkpoints on race tracks
- Slip gate, in which bars are simply inserted into holes or slots in the gateposts to close the 'gate', rather than the gate pivoting on hinges
- Turnstile
- Water gate, to provide access by boat to a fortification
- Slalom skiing gates
- Wicket gate, a small pedestrian gate within a larger vehicle one.

== Image gallery ==
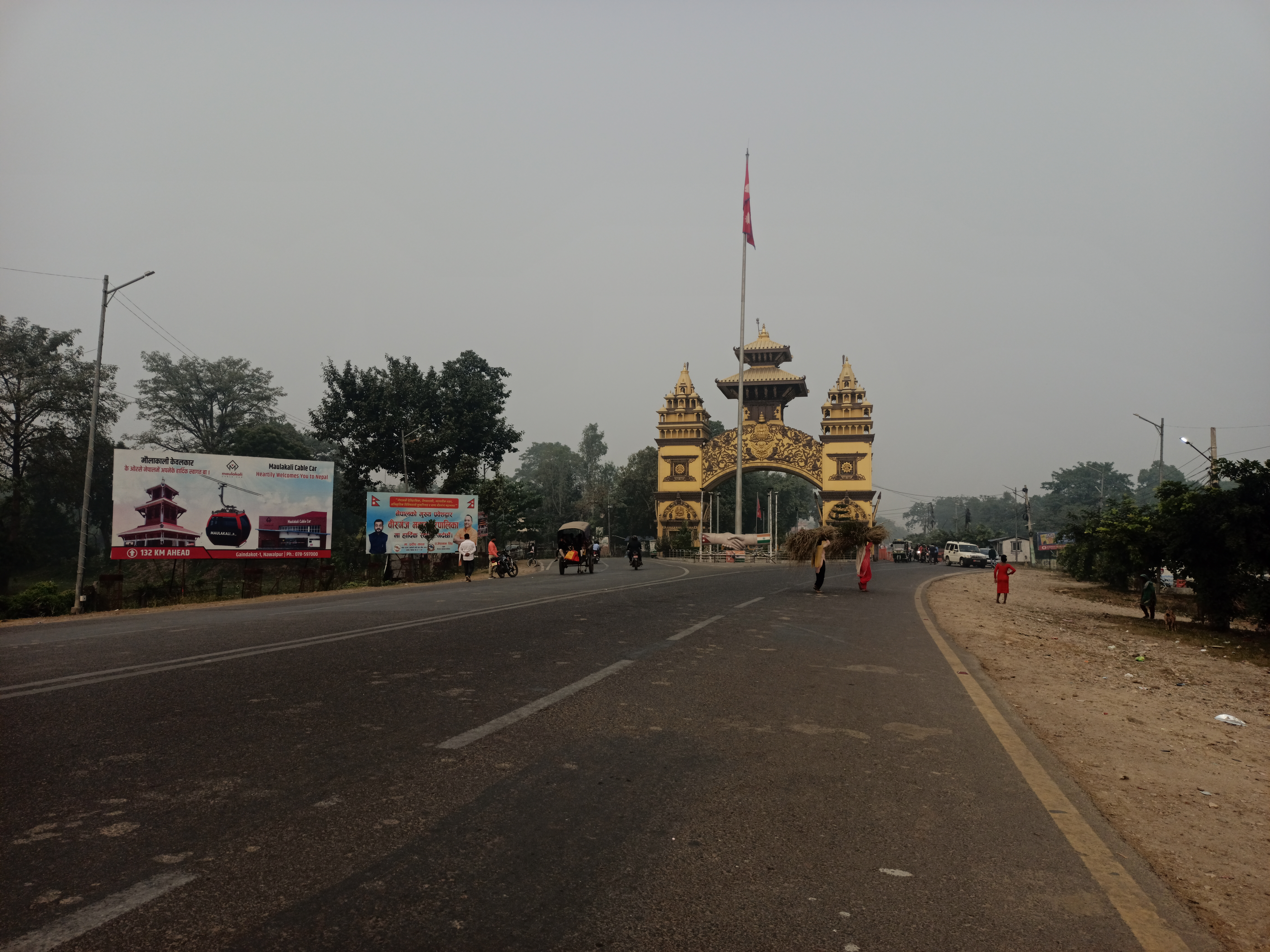
Shankharacharya Gate, Birgunj, is the main entry point of Nepal from North Bihar, India.

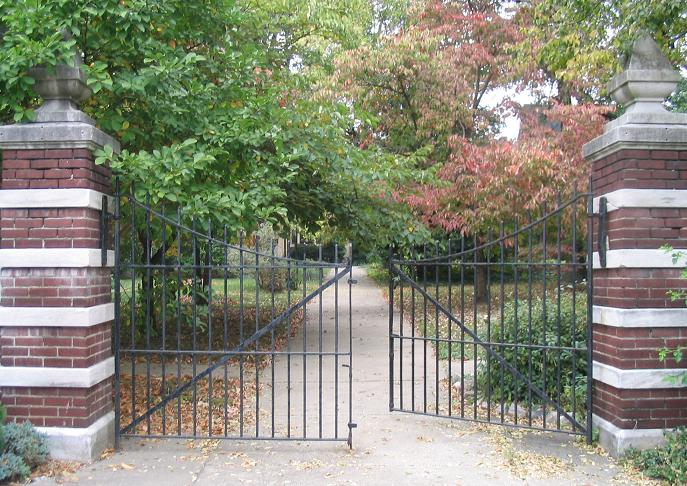
This gate has no locks—a gate marks a borderline in ownership/use and can allow passage.

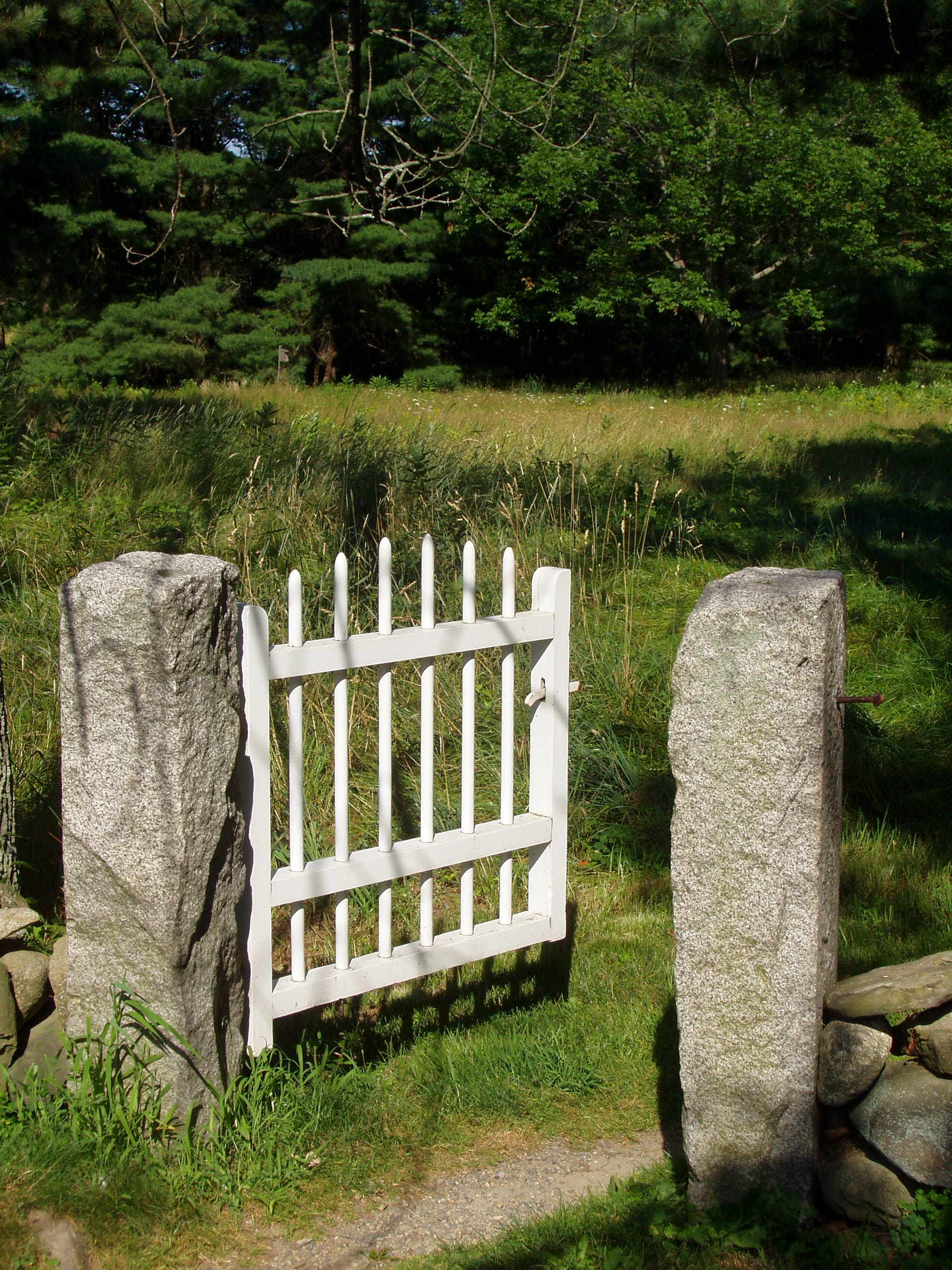
A small gate to a meadow path

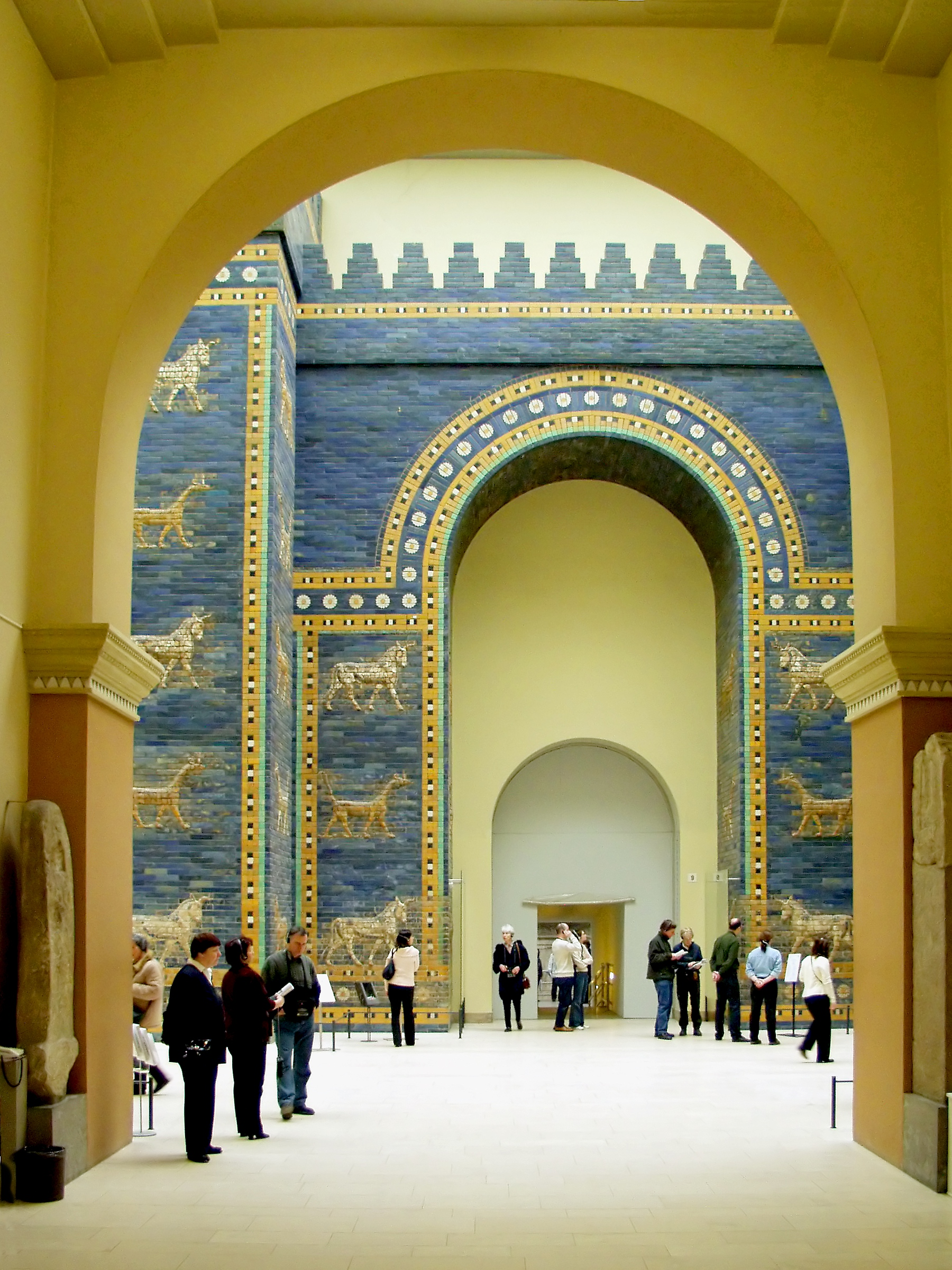
Ishtar Gate is the oldest city gate in existence

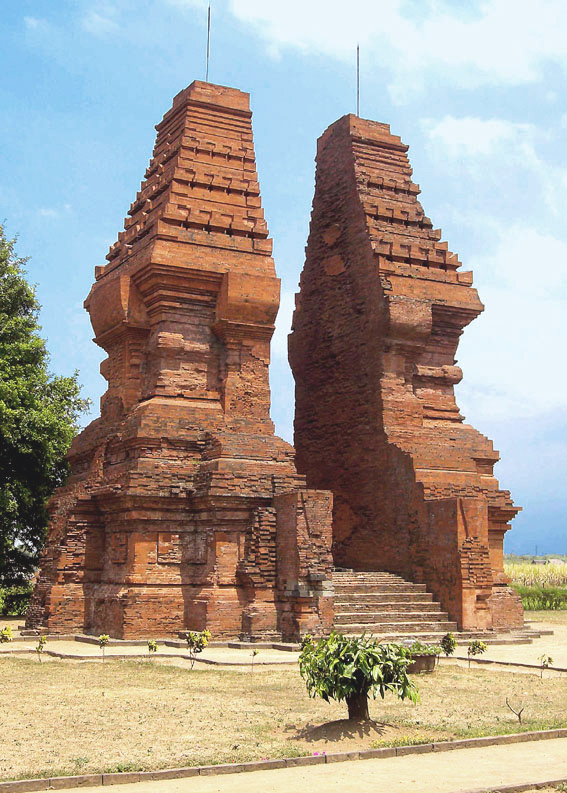
Wringin Lawang, a 14th-century Majapahit split gate, called "Candi bentar", in Trowulan, Java, Indonesia

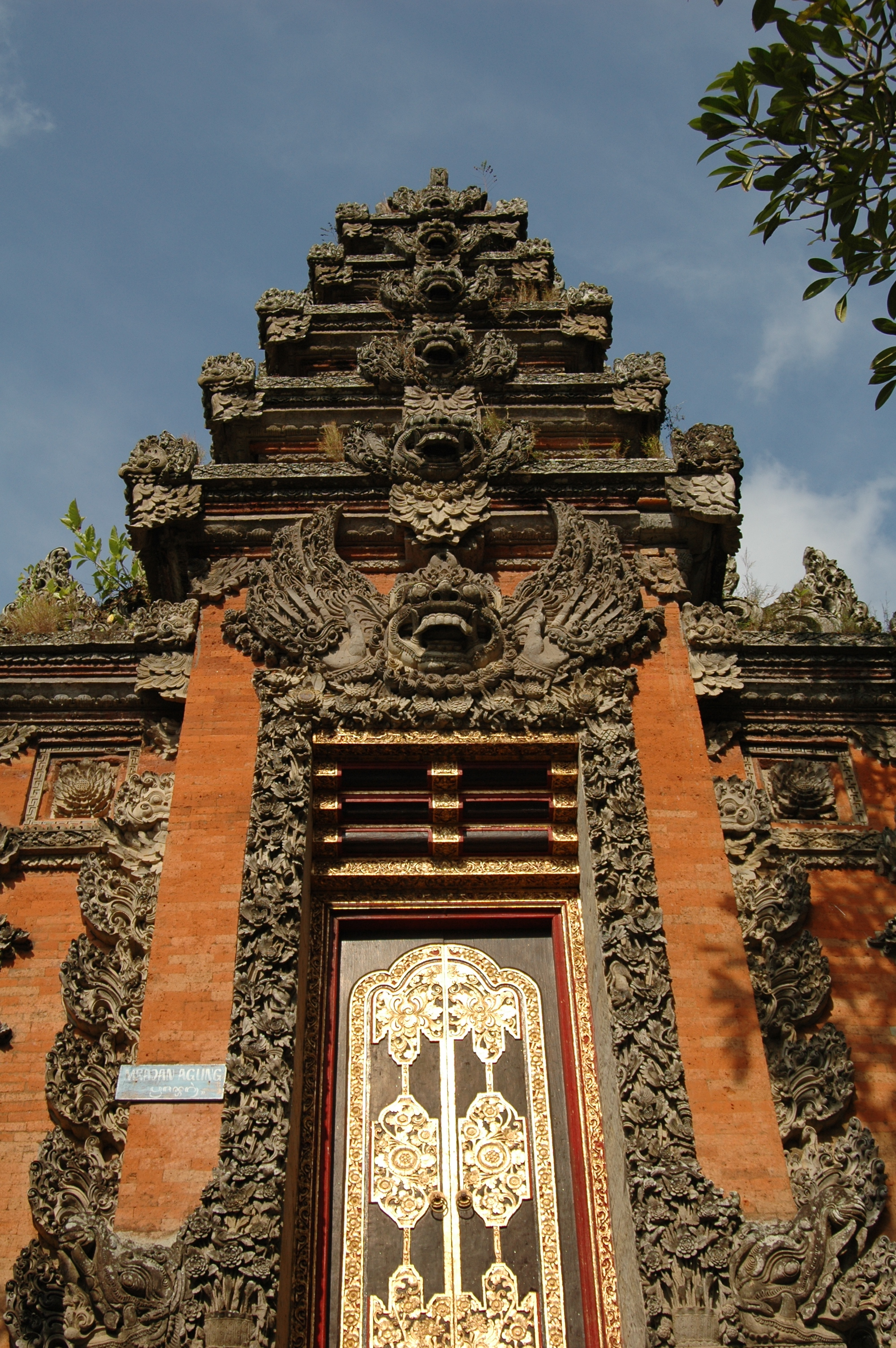
Richly decorated Indonesian Balinese temple gate called Paduraksa

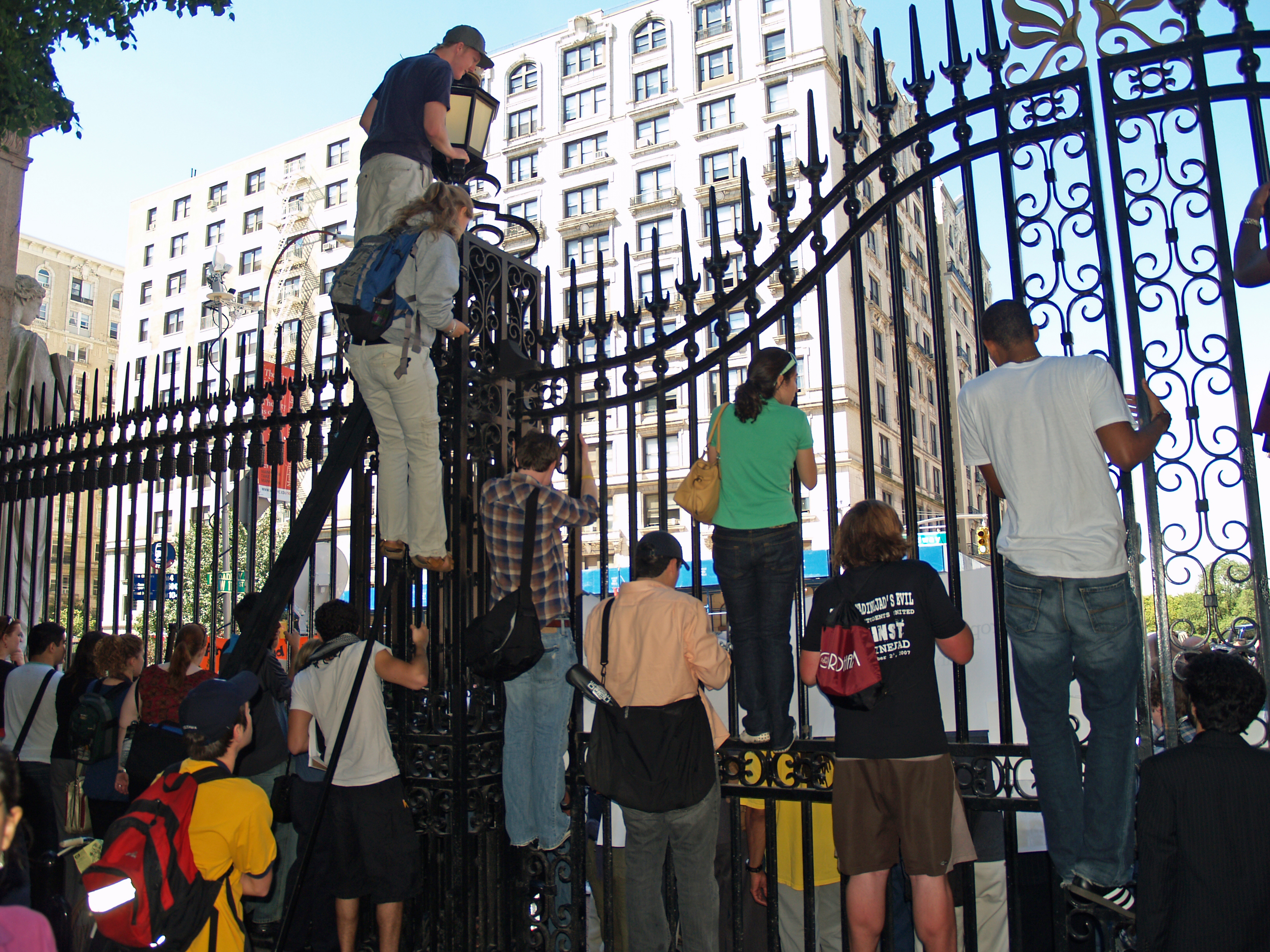
This gate at Columbia University was closed to prevent entry of protesters

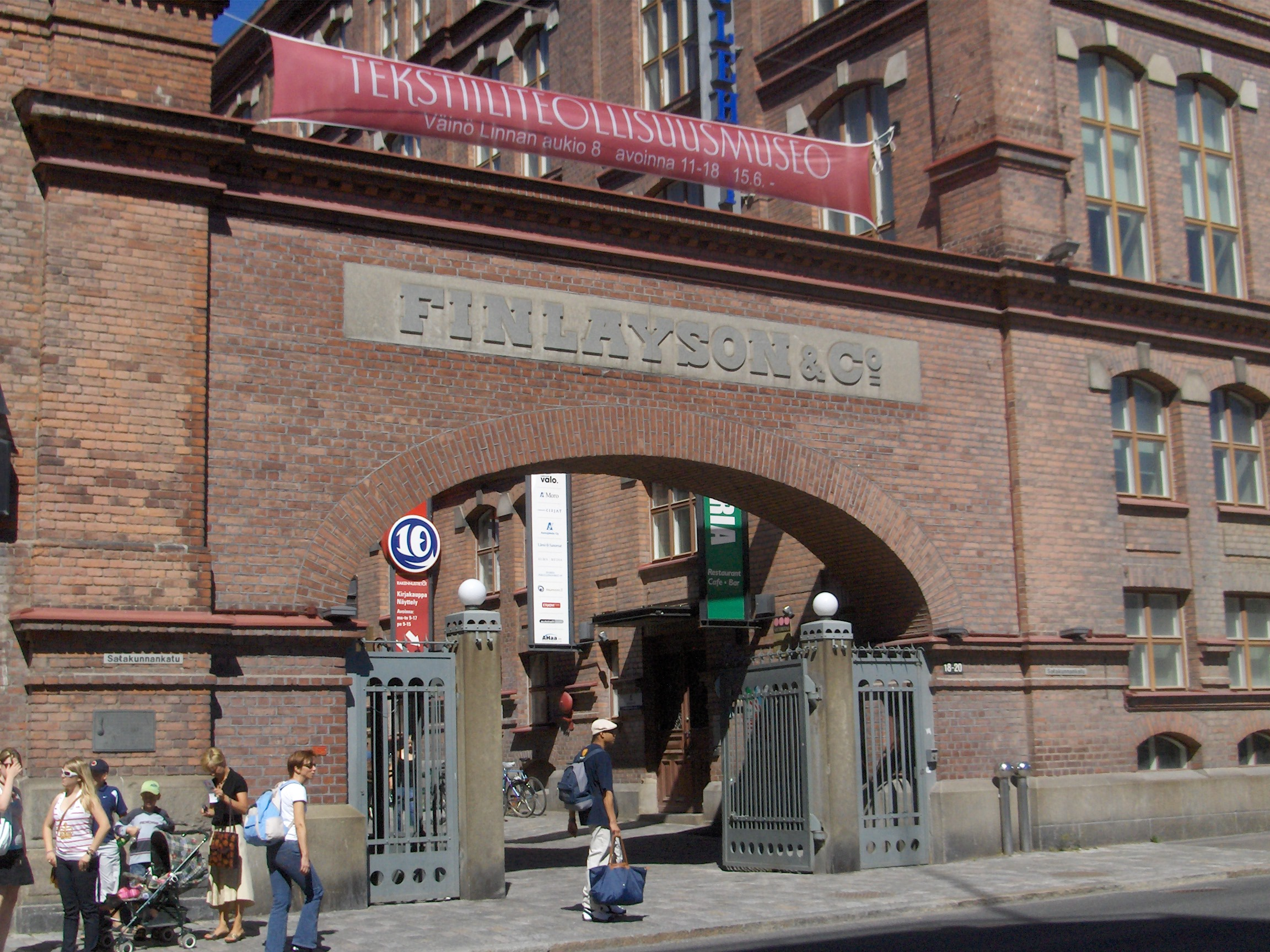
The gate of Finlayson factory in Tampere, Finland

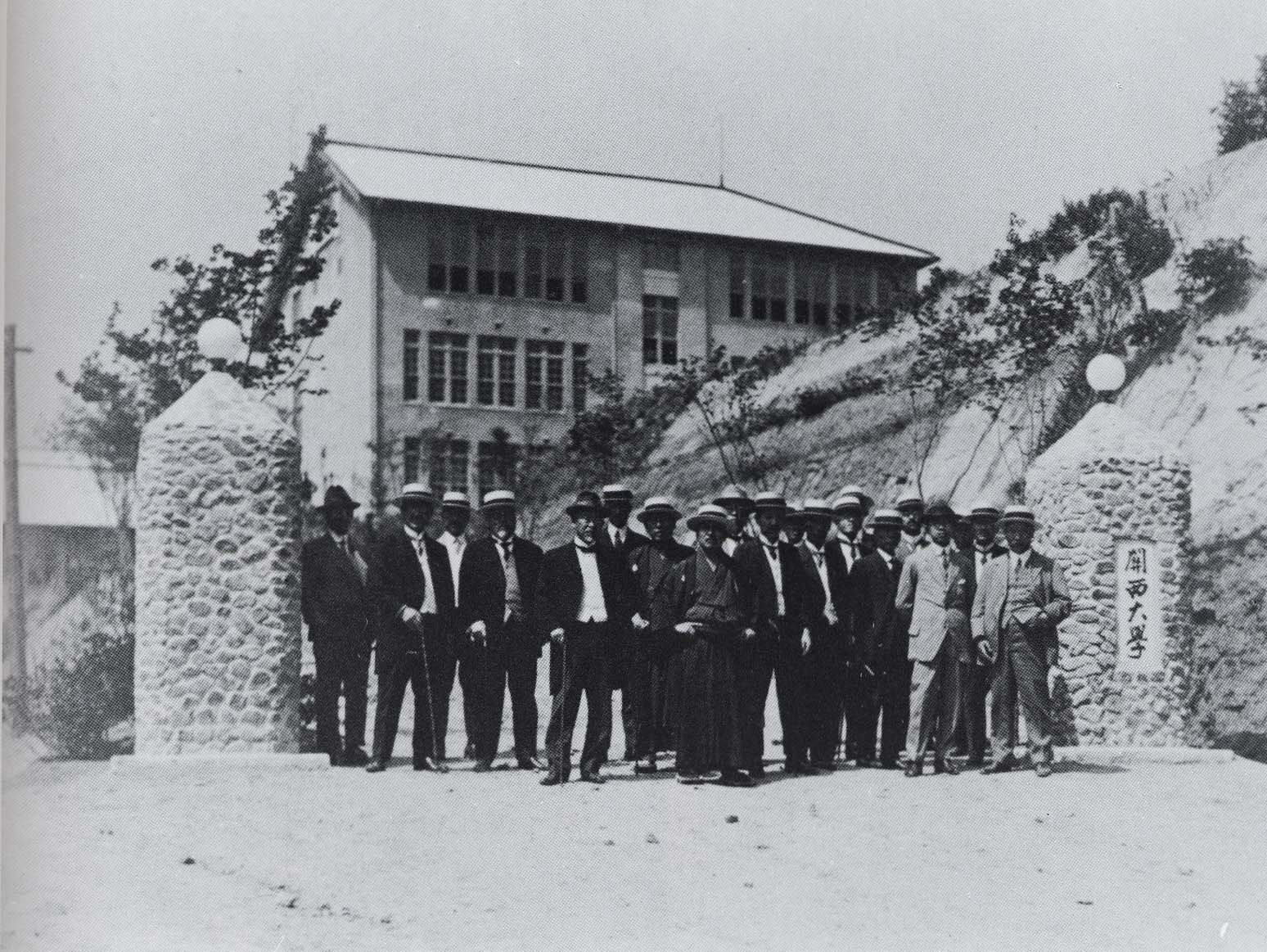
A gate at Kansai University, built in 1923

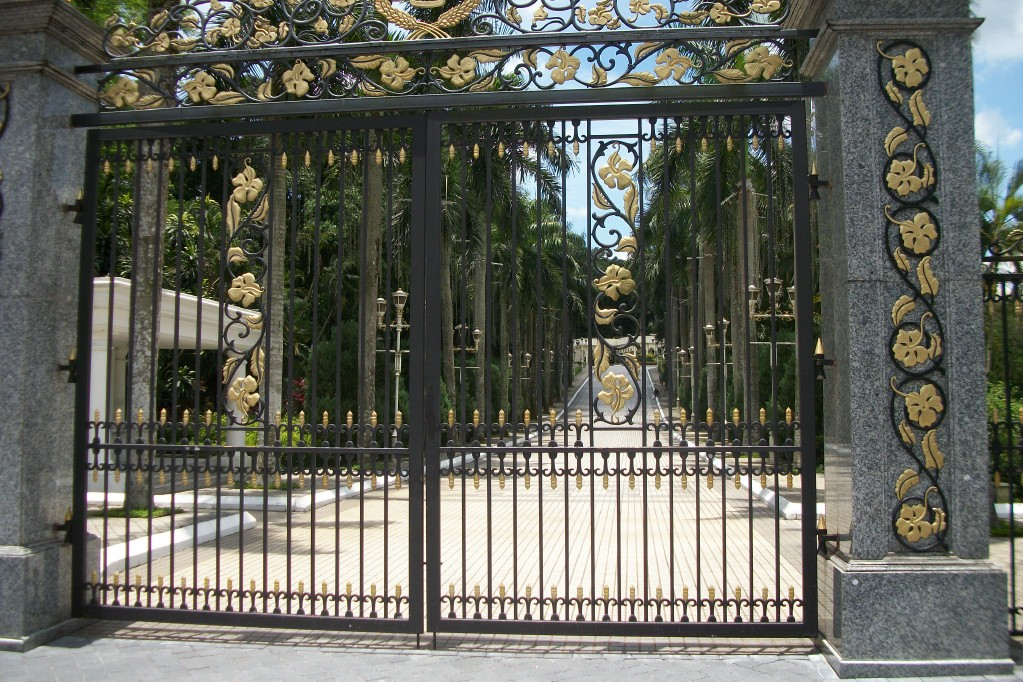
Malaysian King's Palace Gate, Kuala Lumpur

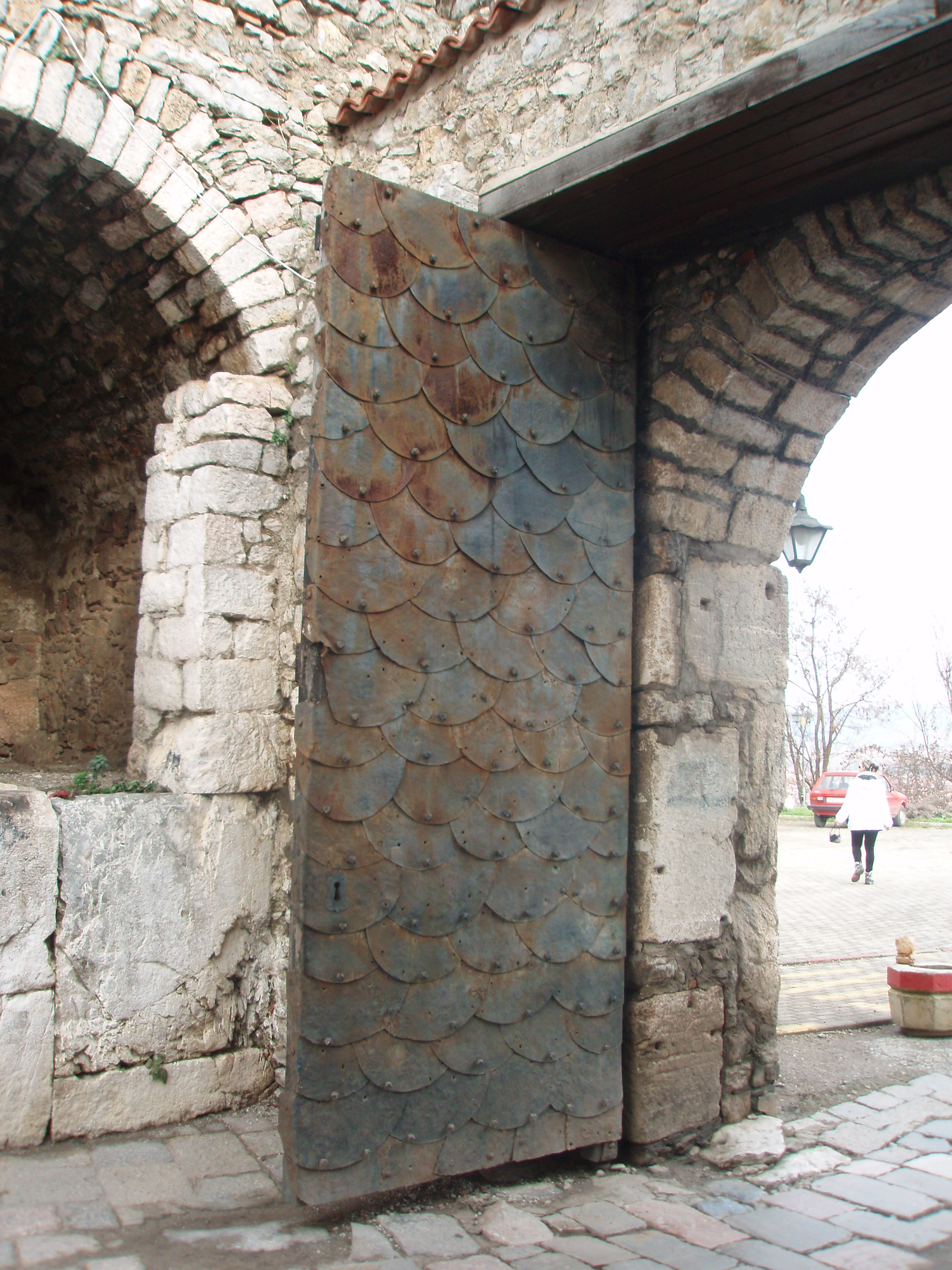
Medieval iron-clad city gate, from the Upper Gate in the old town of Ohrid

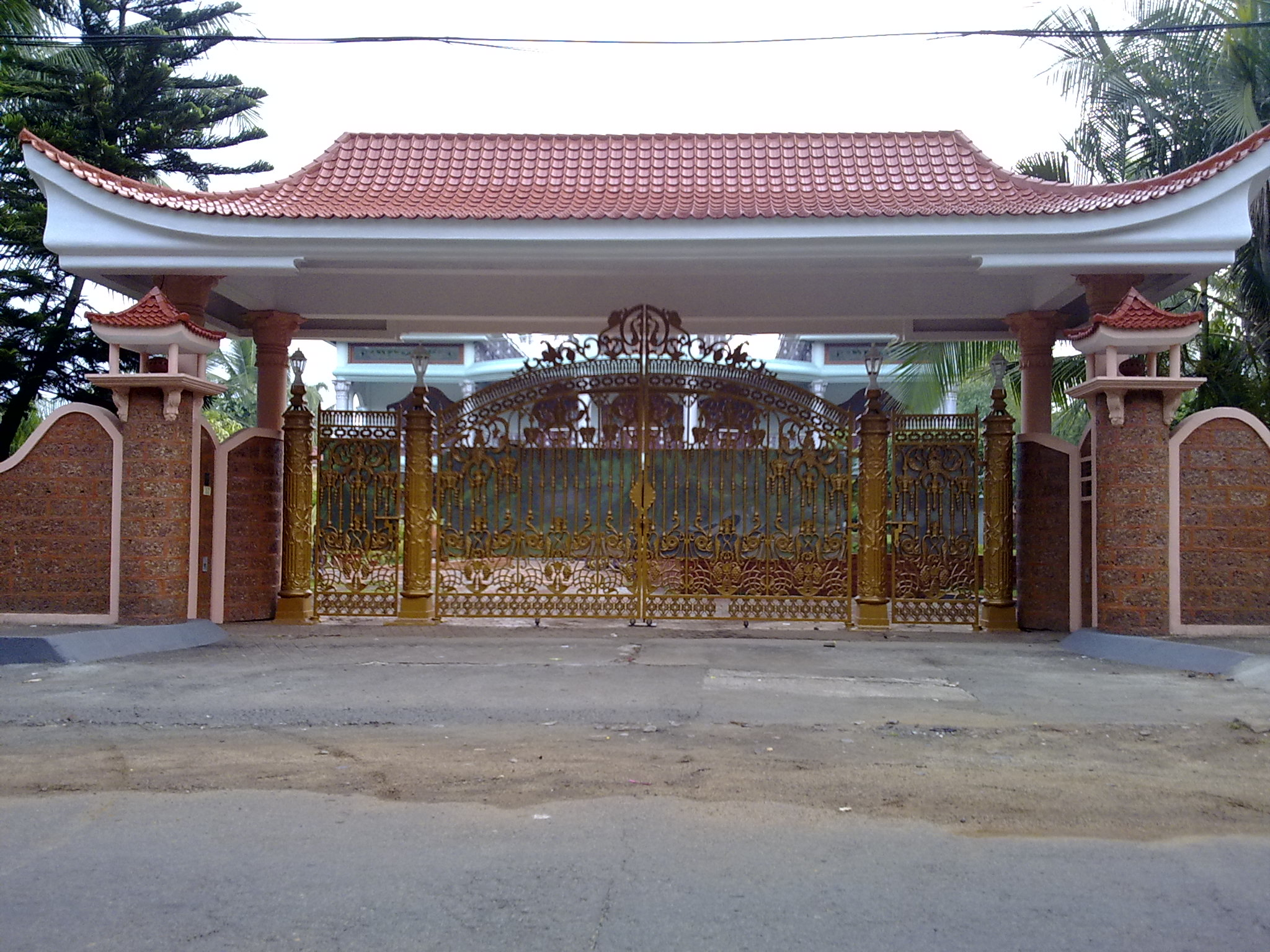
Chinese traditional type gate (iron gate in front of house) in Kerala, India

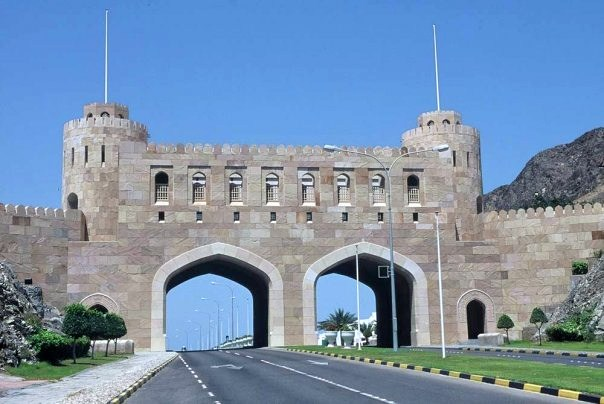
Gates decorate routes into Muscat, Oman

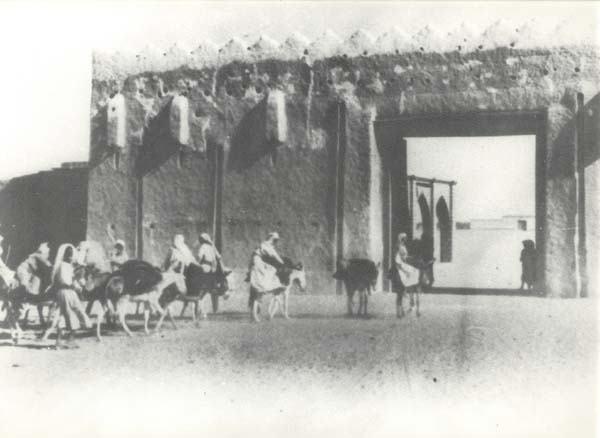
Kuwait Gate, historically surrounded Kuwait City, built in 1929

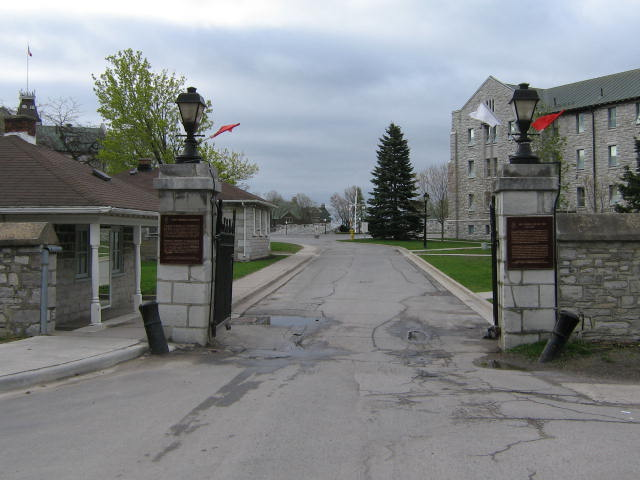
Royal Military College of Canada front gates and gatehouse

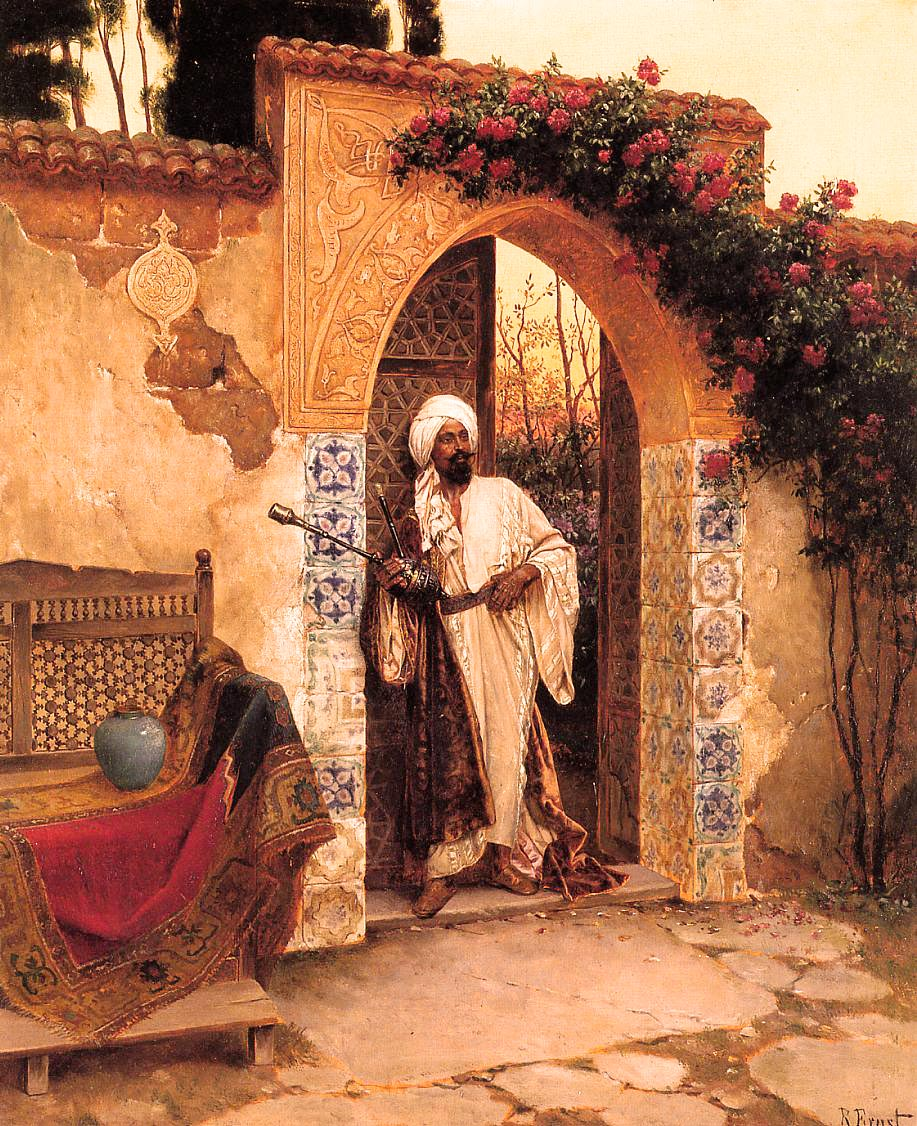
Ernst Rudolph, By the Entrance

A wooden gate pictured in the coat of arms of Nivala

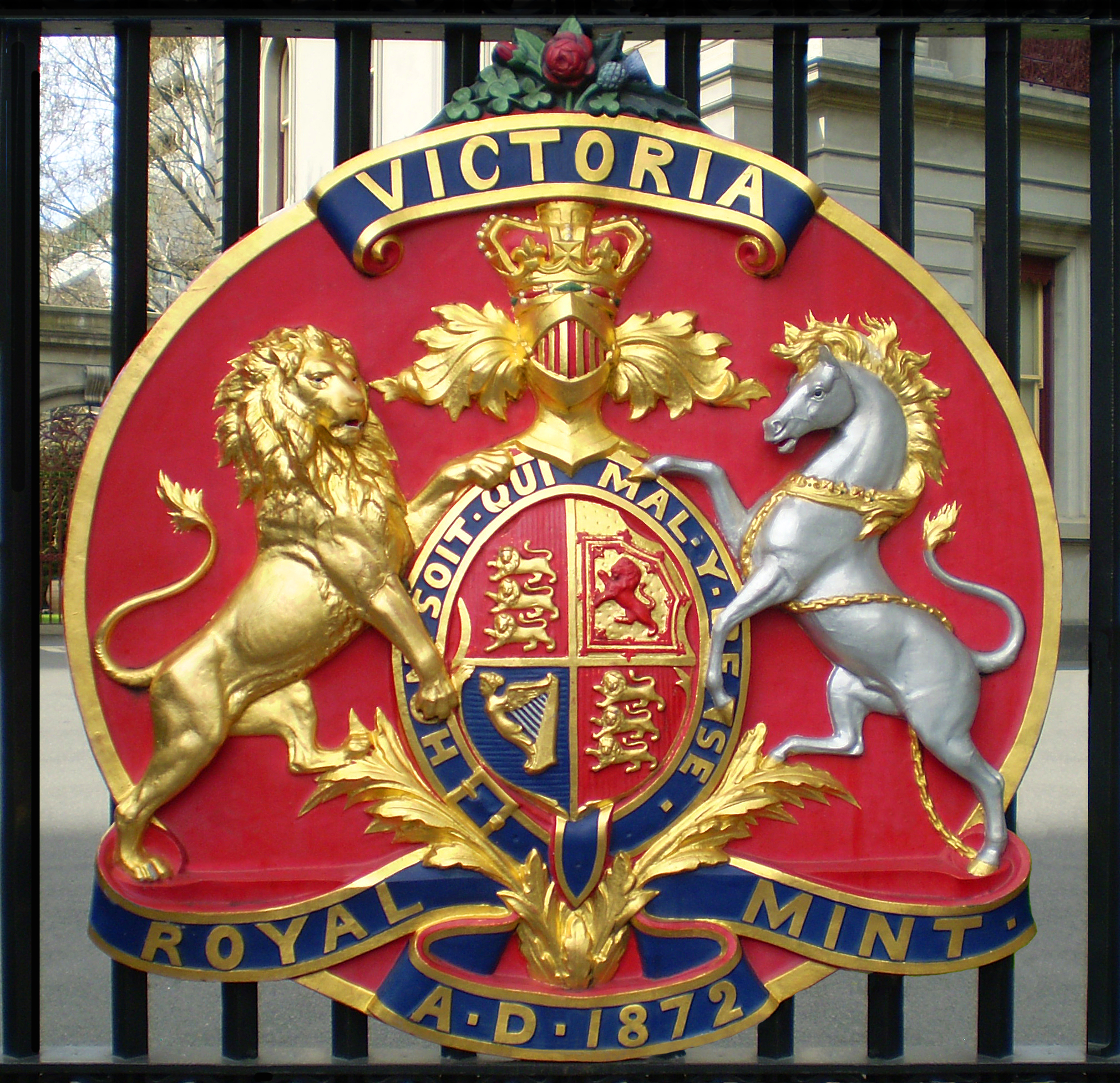
Decorative emblems of state are also fixed on gates to public buildings, old Royal Melbourne Mint

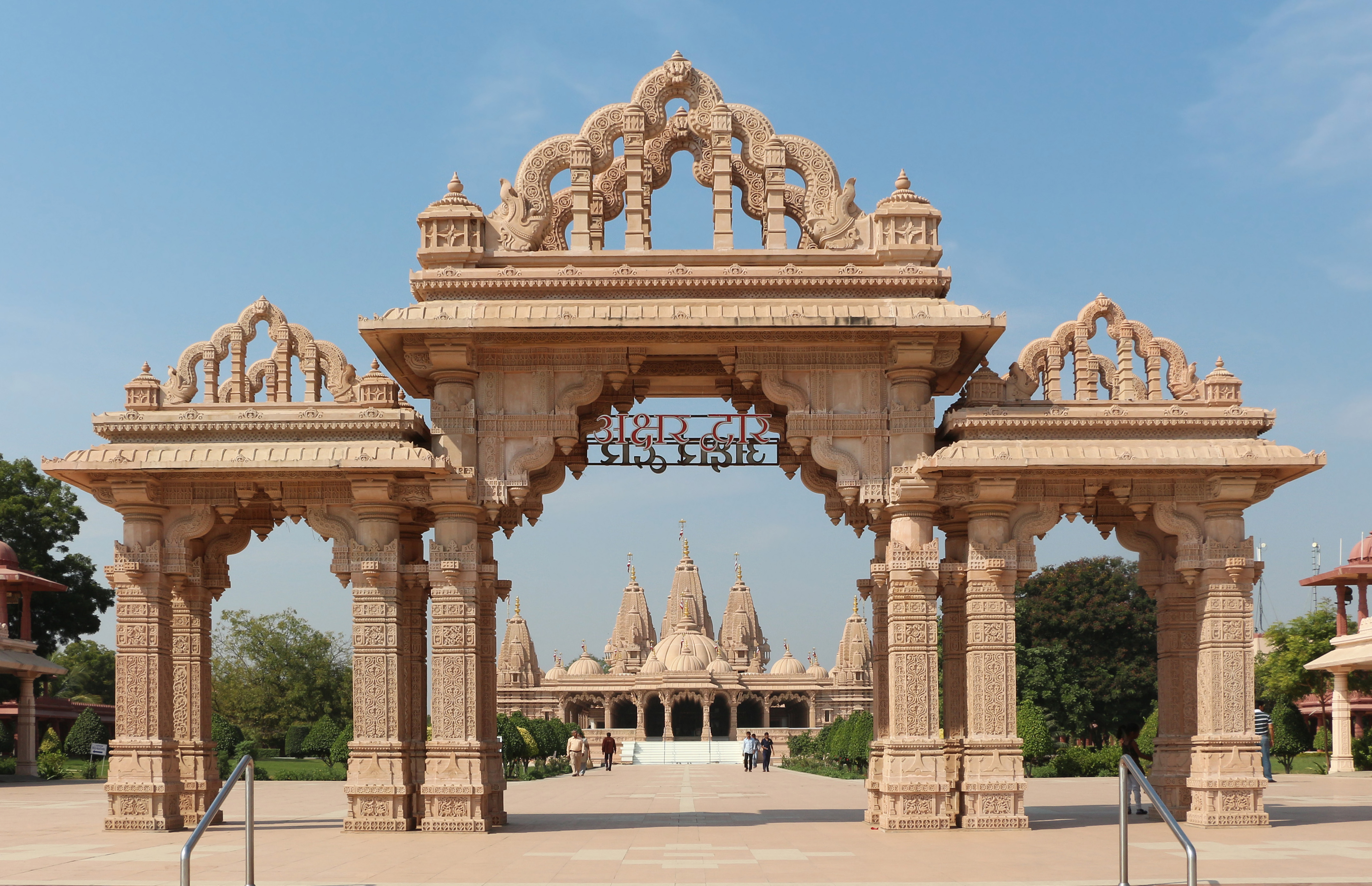
Gate of Shri Swaminarayan Mandir, Bhavnagar, India

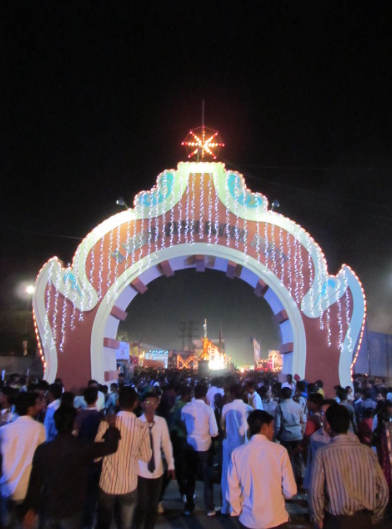
Dr.Babasaheb Ambedkar Marathwada University gate on the eve of Namvistar Din celebrations reflects Ajanata art

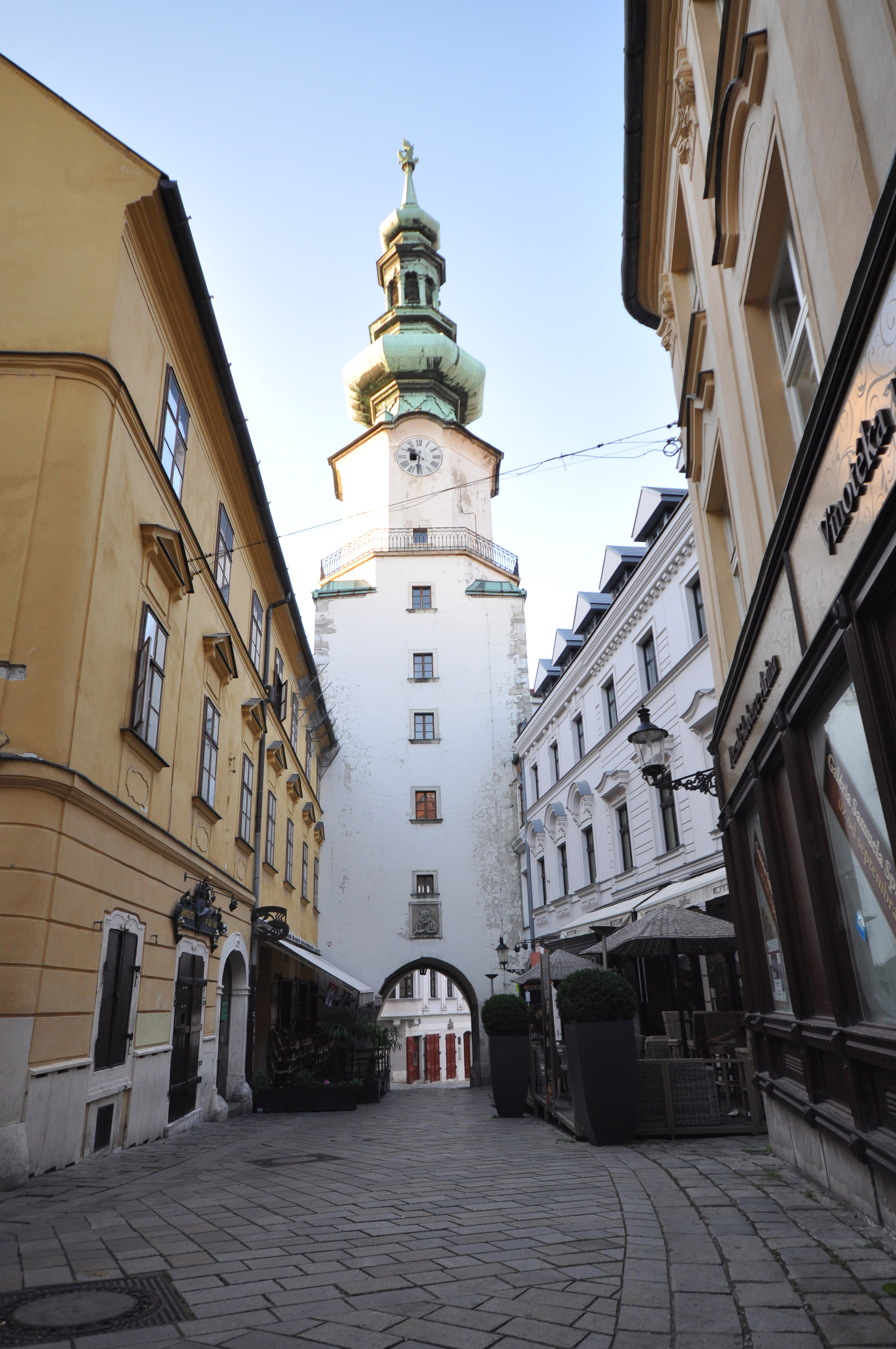
Michael's Gate in Bratislava, Slovakia

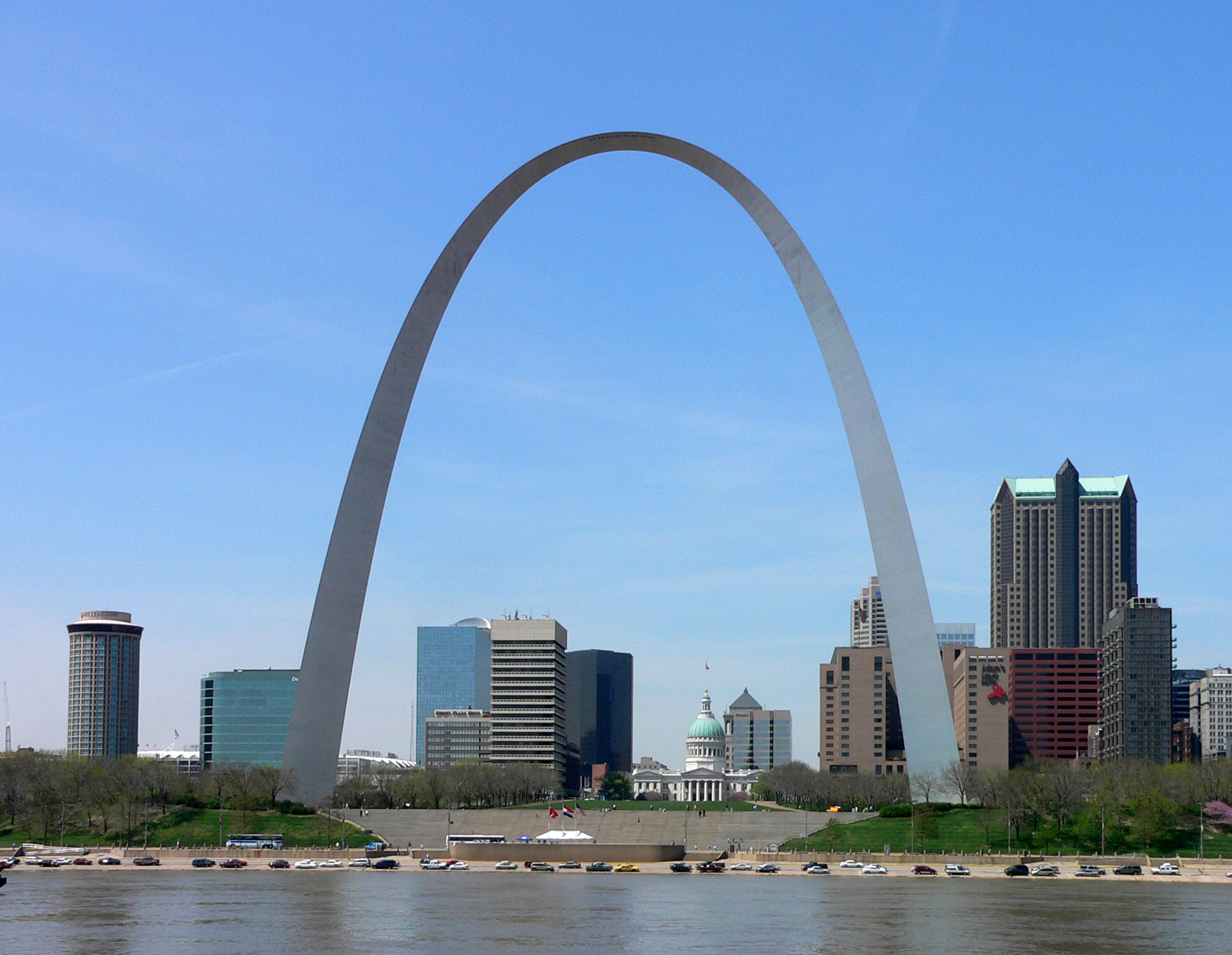
St. Louis Gateway Arch

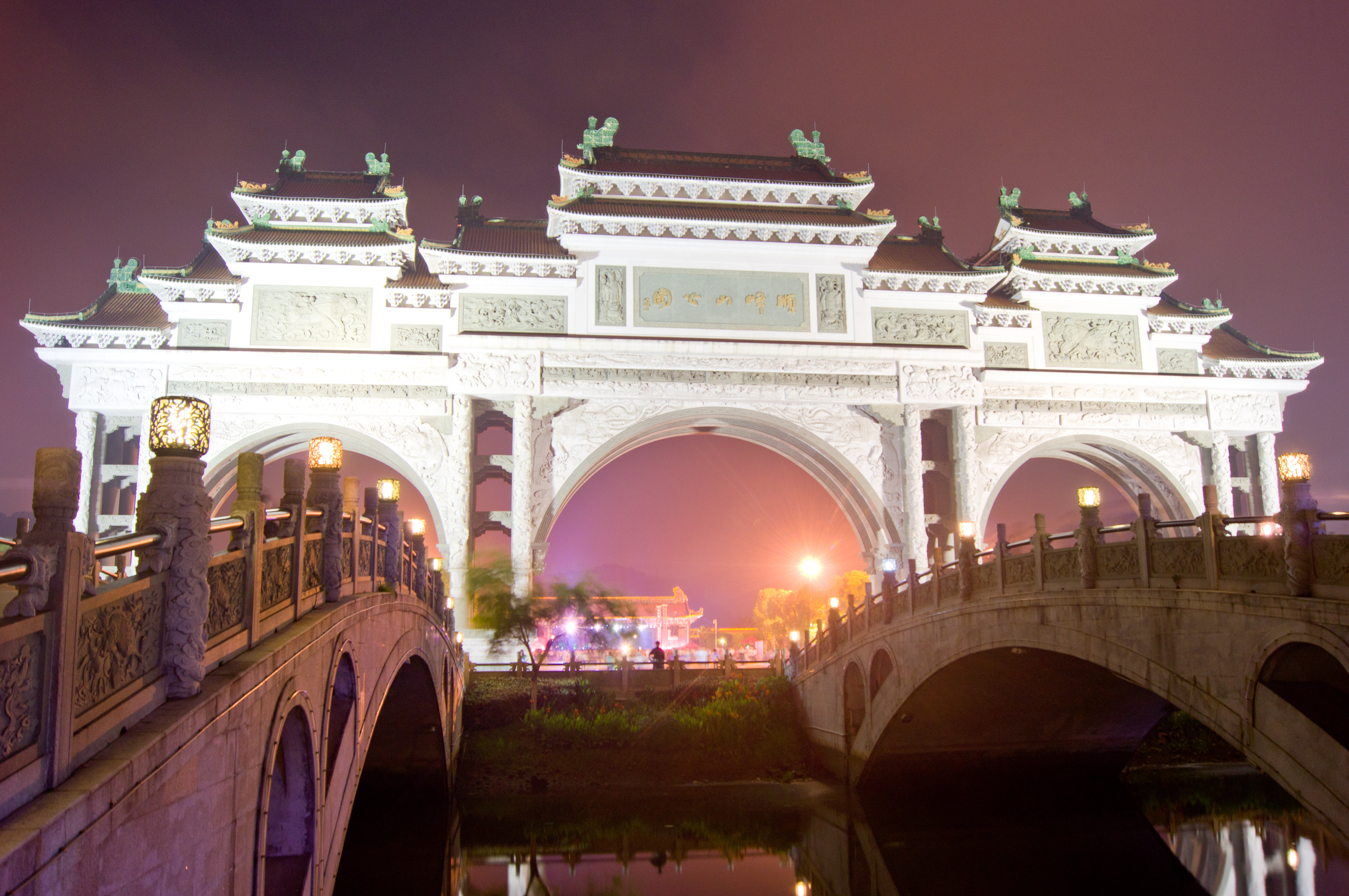
A Chinese Paifang at Foshan, China

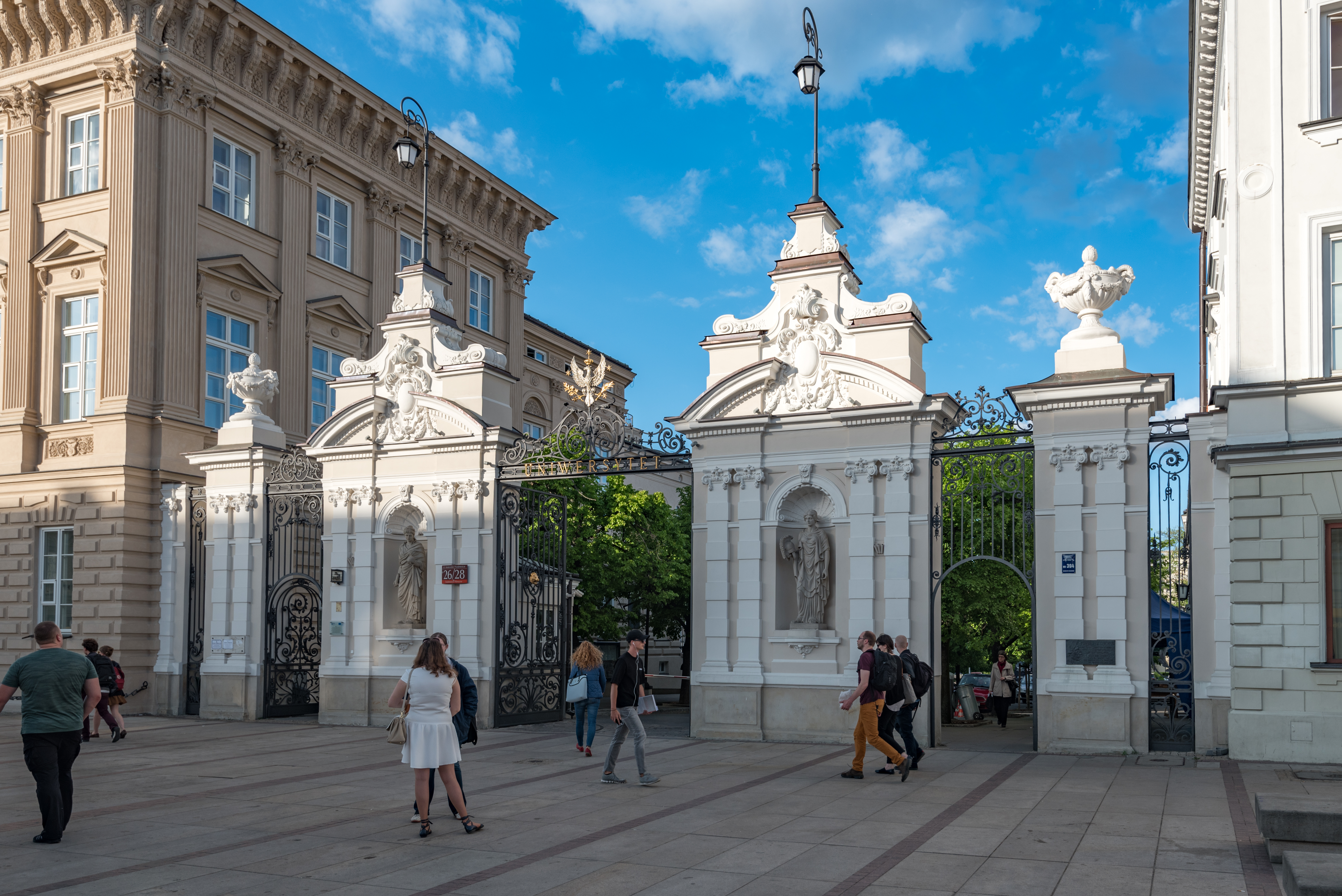
Warsaw University main gate, Poland

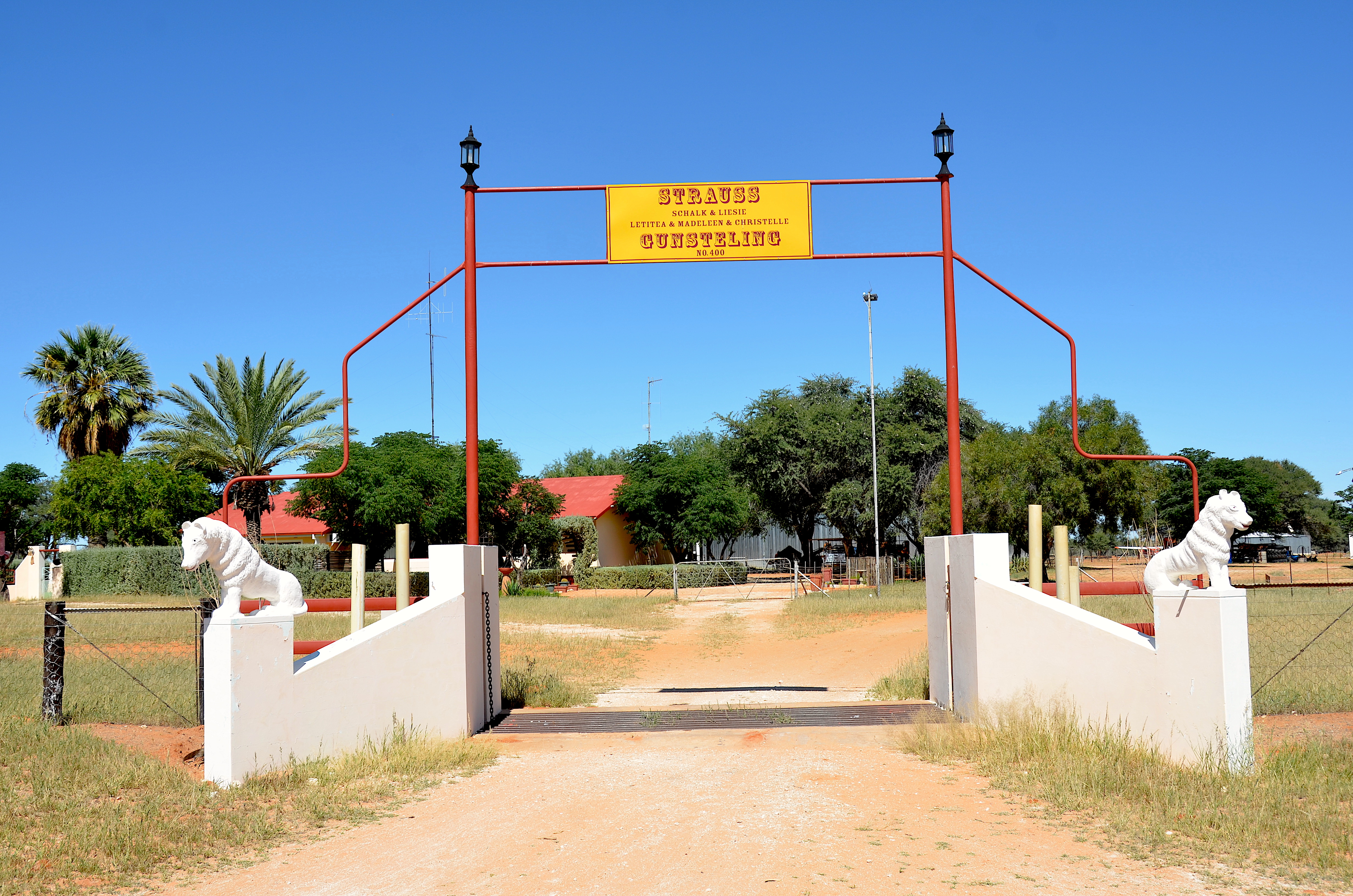
Gate of Farm Gunsteling in Namibia (2017)

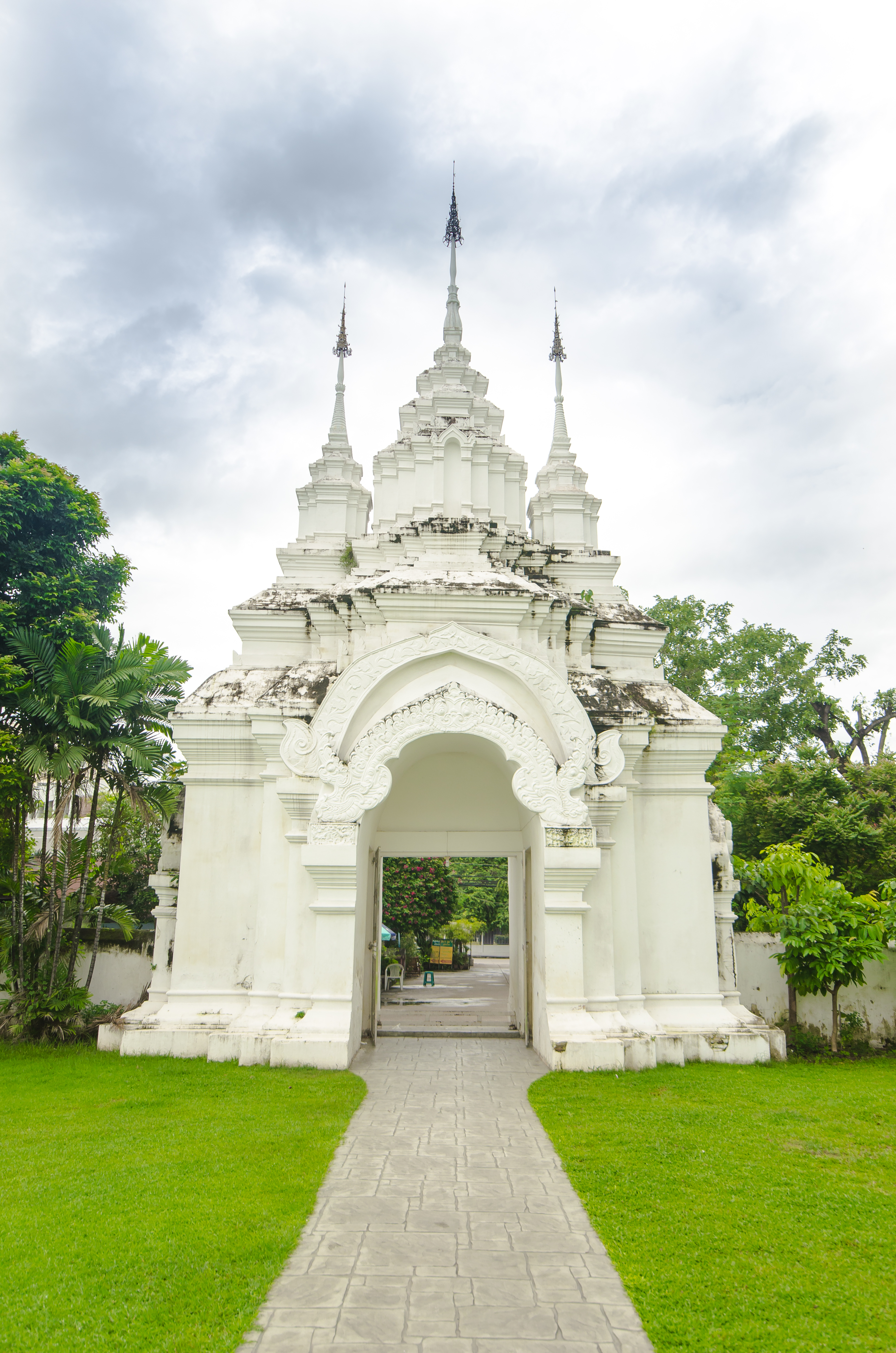
Thai Temple (wat) gate at Wat Suan Dok, Chiang Mai

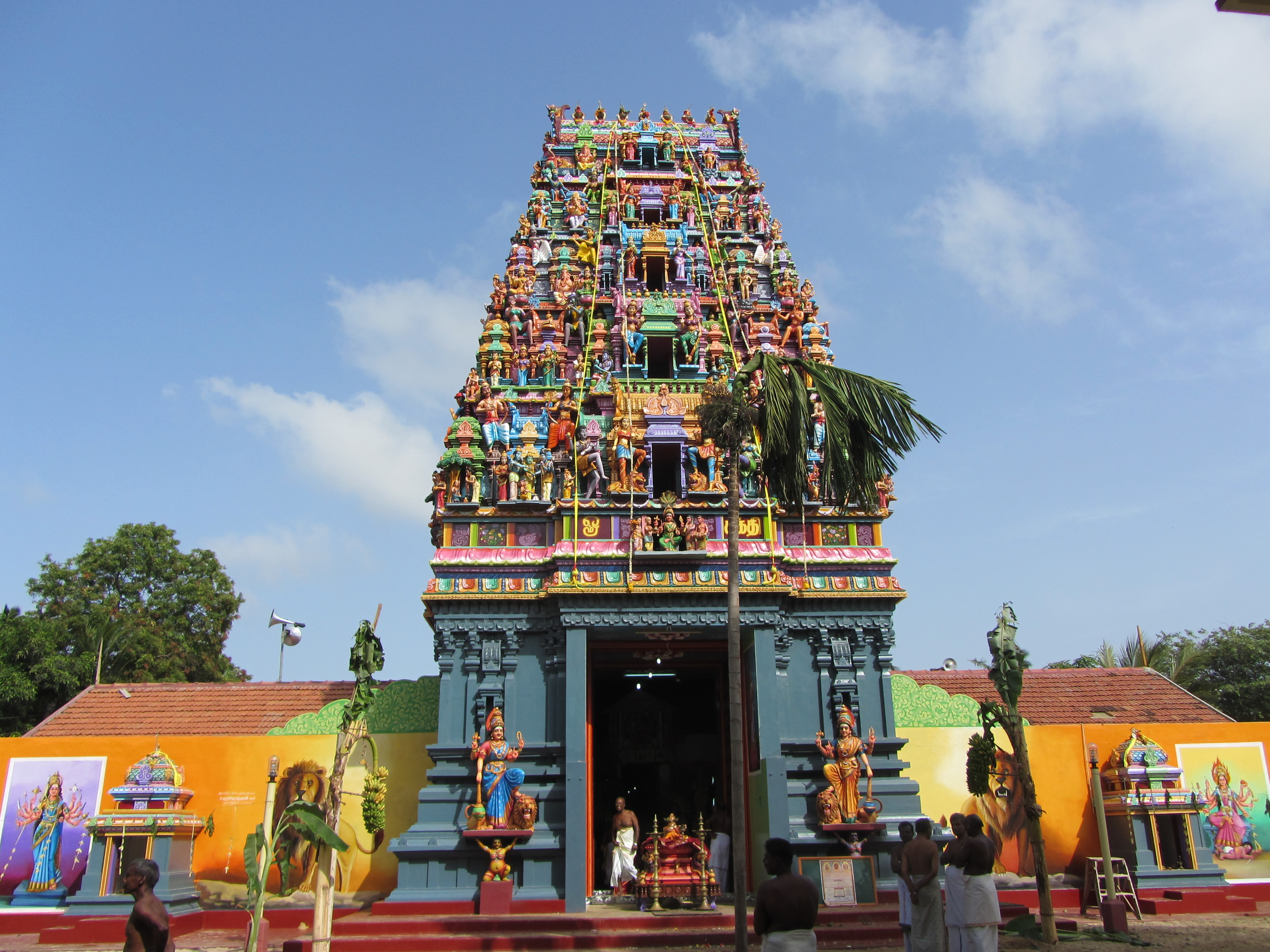
A gopuram, Hindu temple gate tower, in Sri Lanka

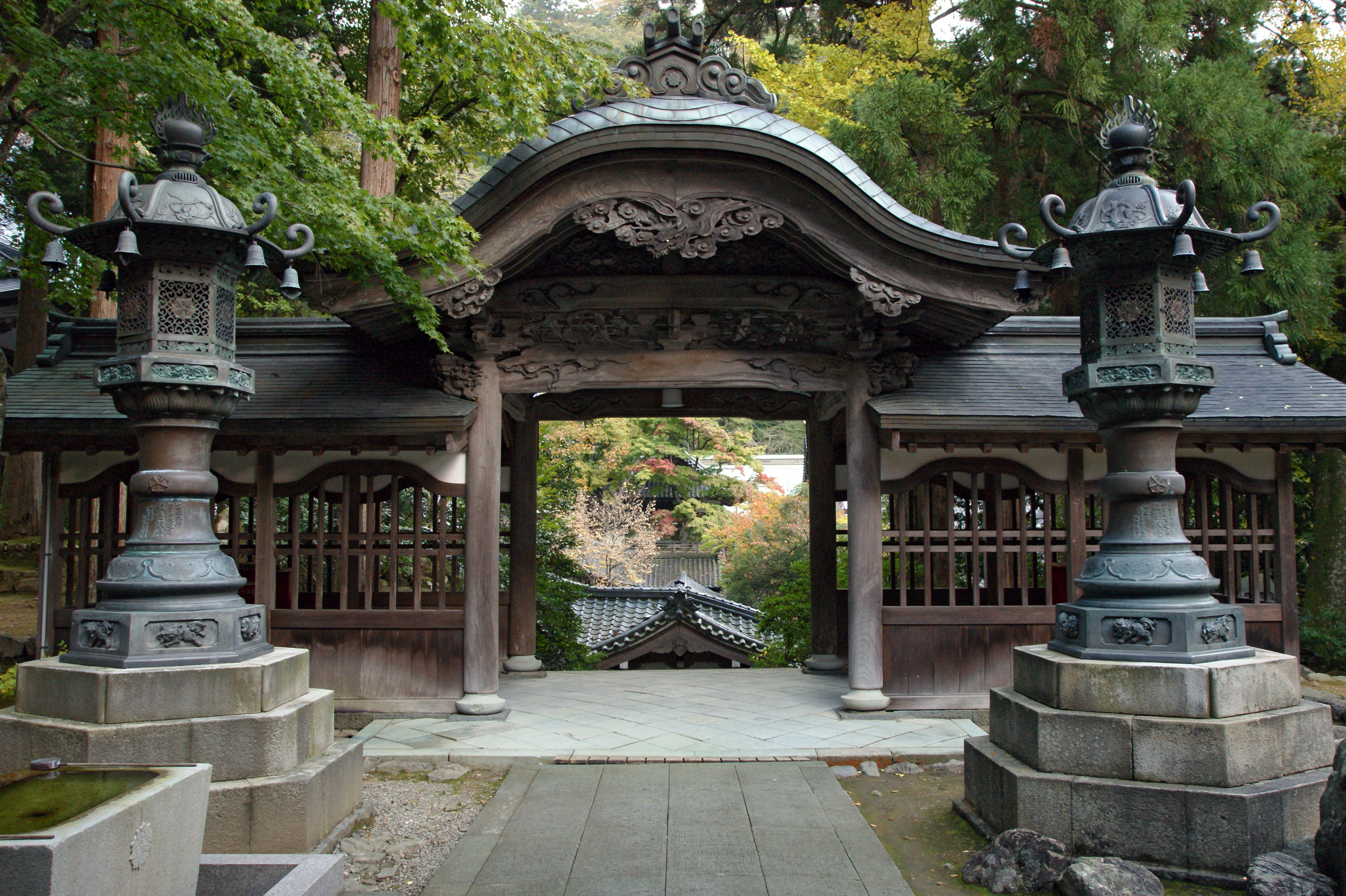
A Japanese temple gate (mon) at Eiheiji

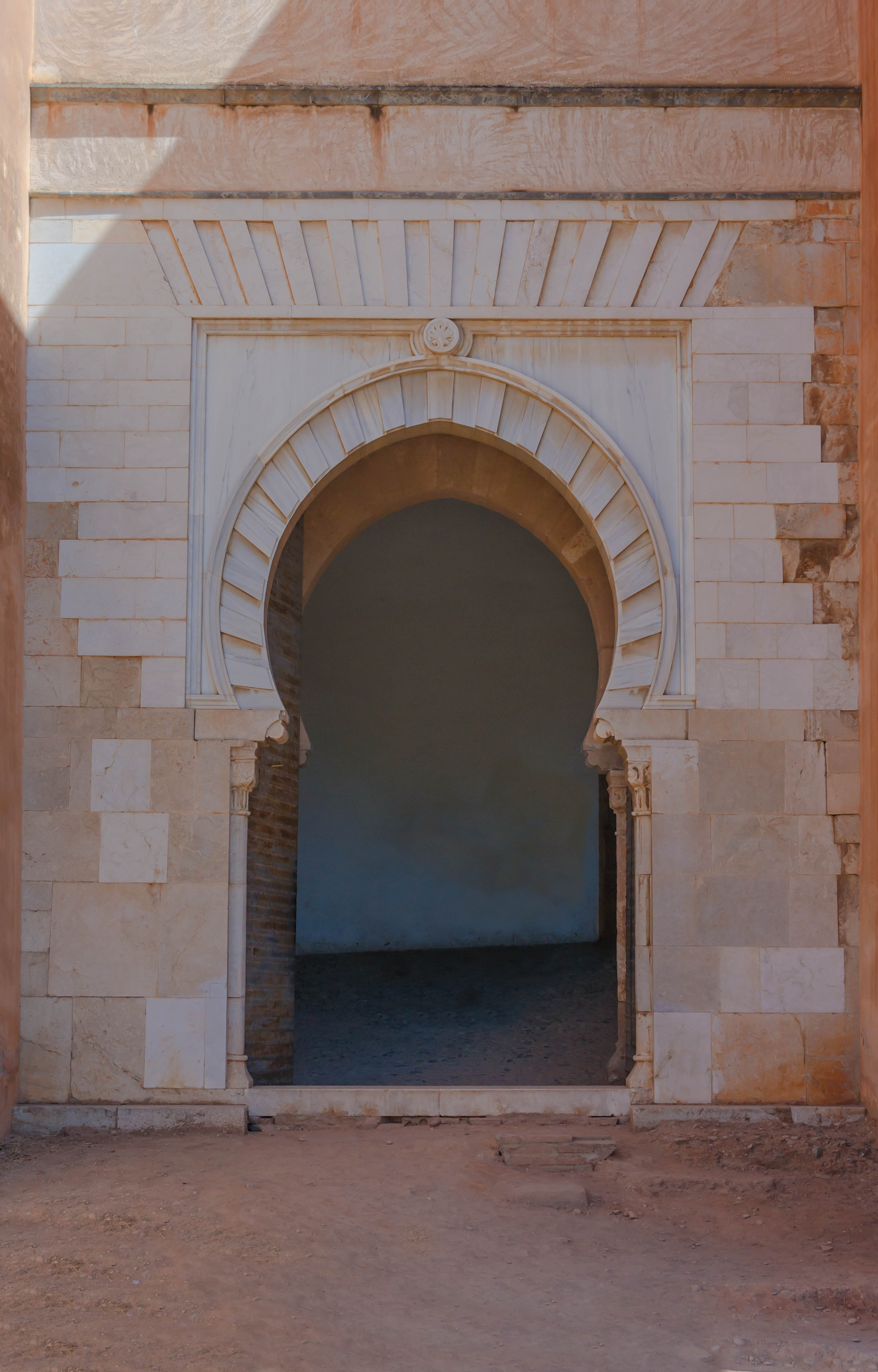
A Moorish gate in Alhambra, Granada, Spain

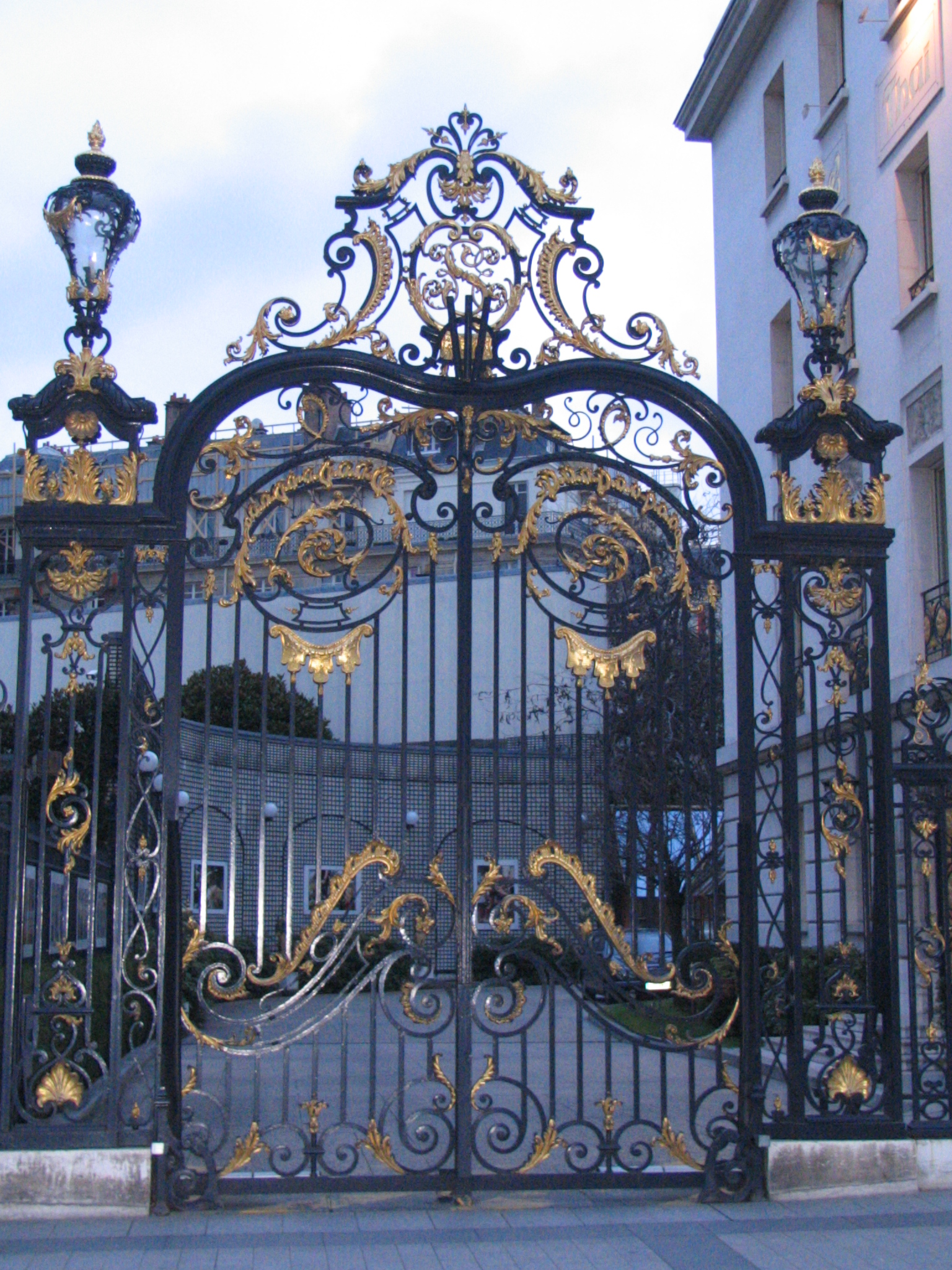
A French-manner gate of the embassy of Thailand in Paris

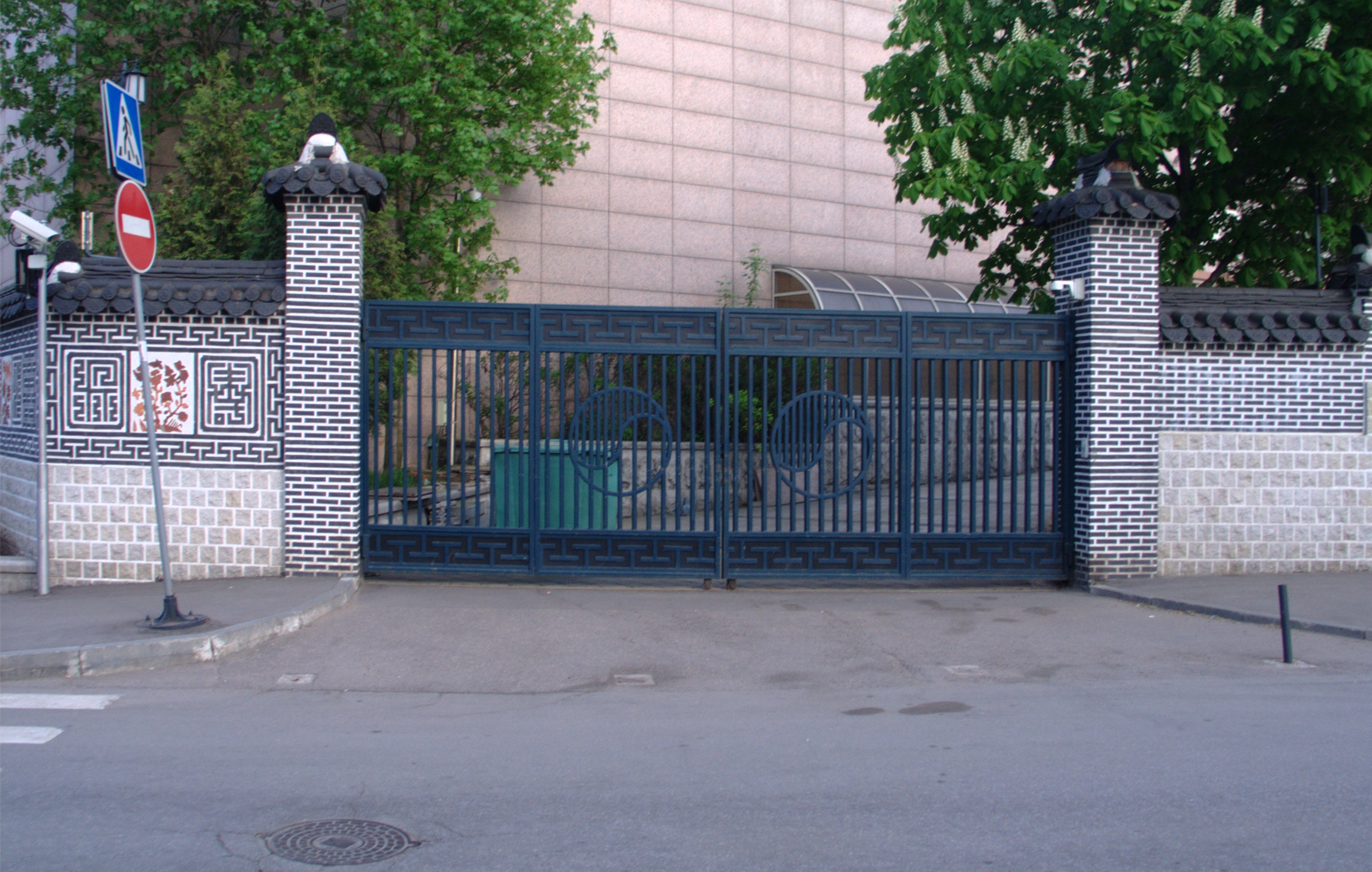
Adapted-Korean-manner gate of the embassy of South Korea in Moscow

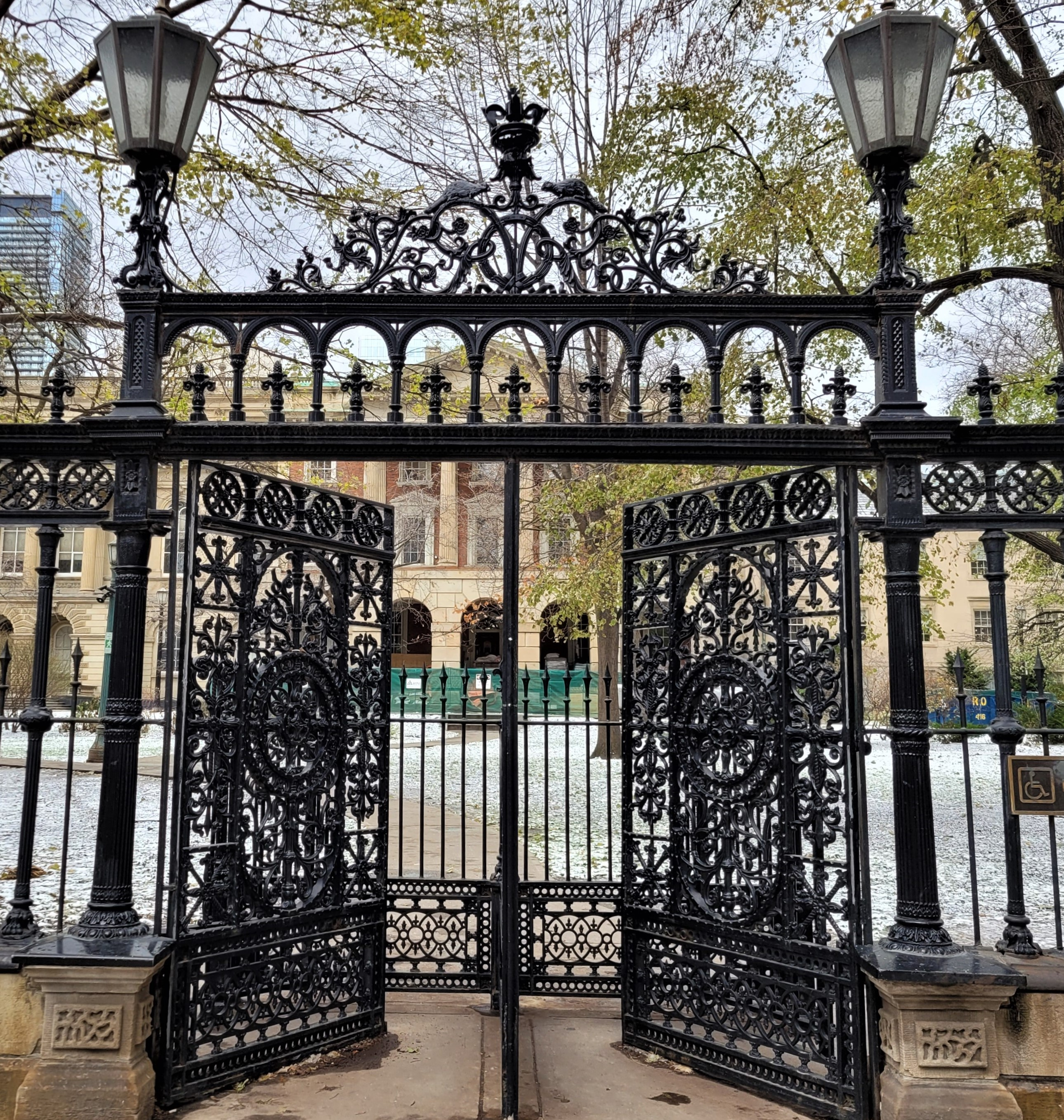
The Iron Gates of Osgoode Hall, Toronto

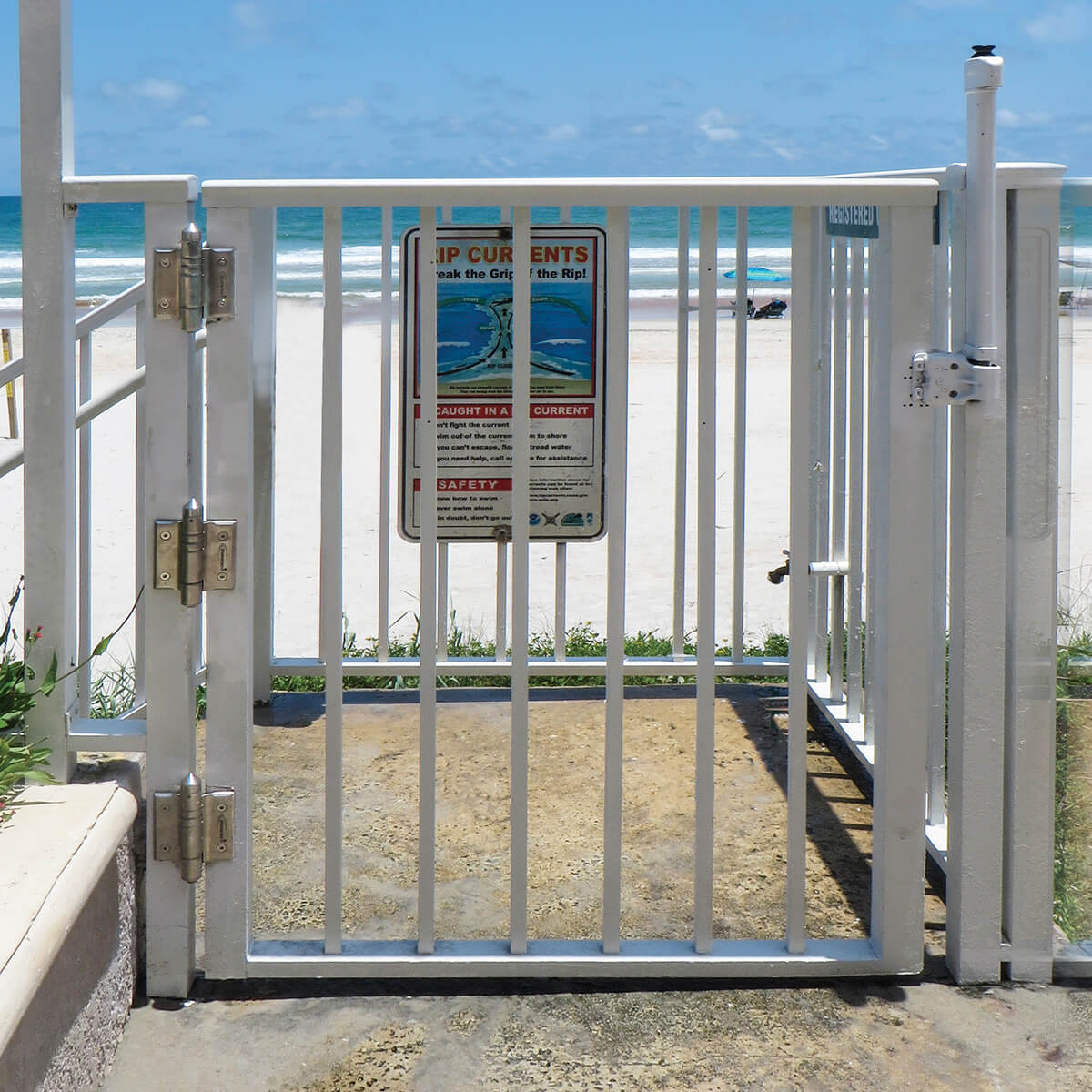
Beachside gate with a self-latching device and a higher than 54” release mechanism.

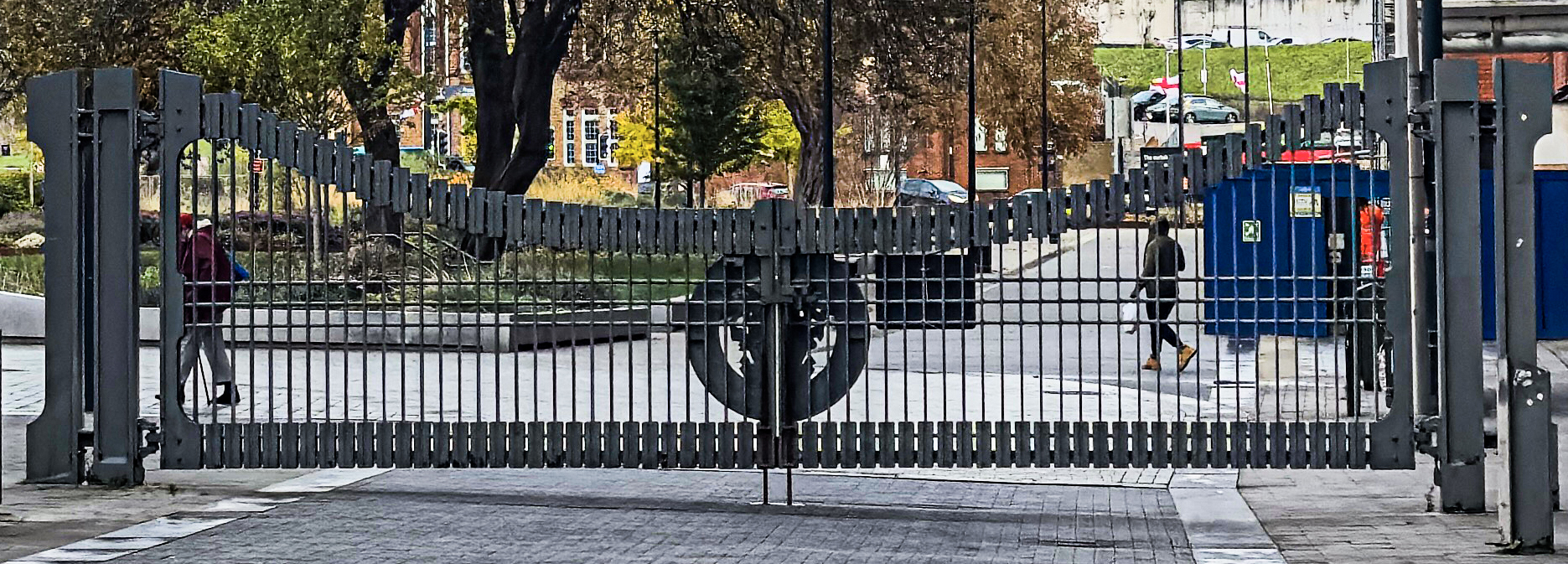
Military style gates in Chatham, Kent, England.

== See also ==
- Barricade
- Bar gate
- Border
- Gate tower
- Gopuram
- Leave the gate as you found it
- Portal (architecture)
- Triumphal arch
