= Electric gate =

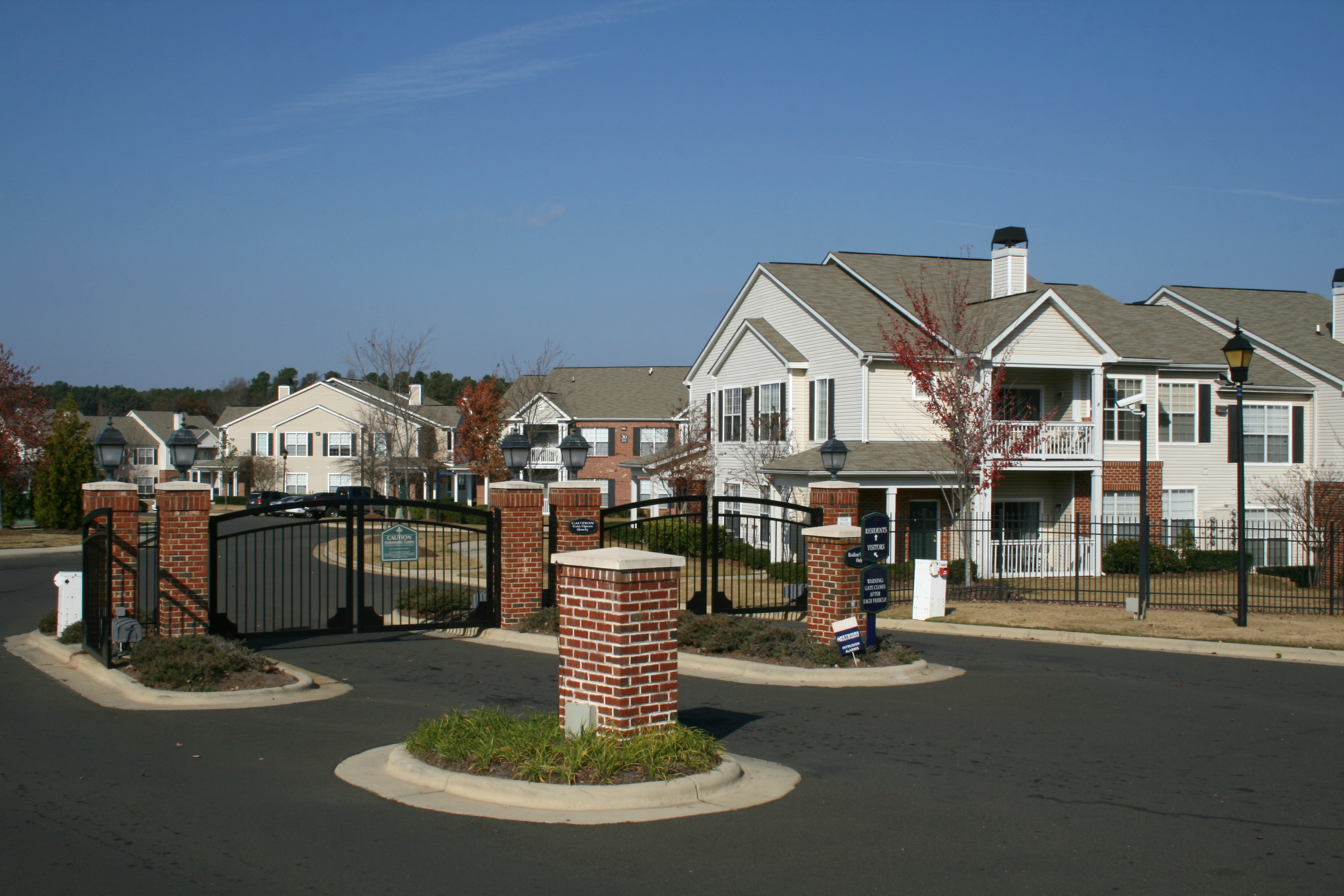
Electric security gates at an apartment complex in Durham, North Carolina.

An electric gate is a type of gate that can be opened and closed using an electrically powered mechanism.

== Electric Gate Options ==
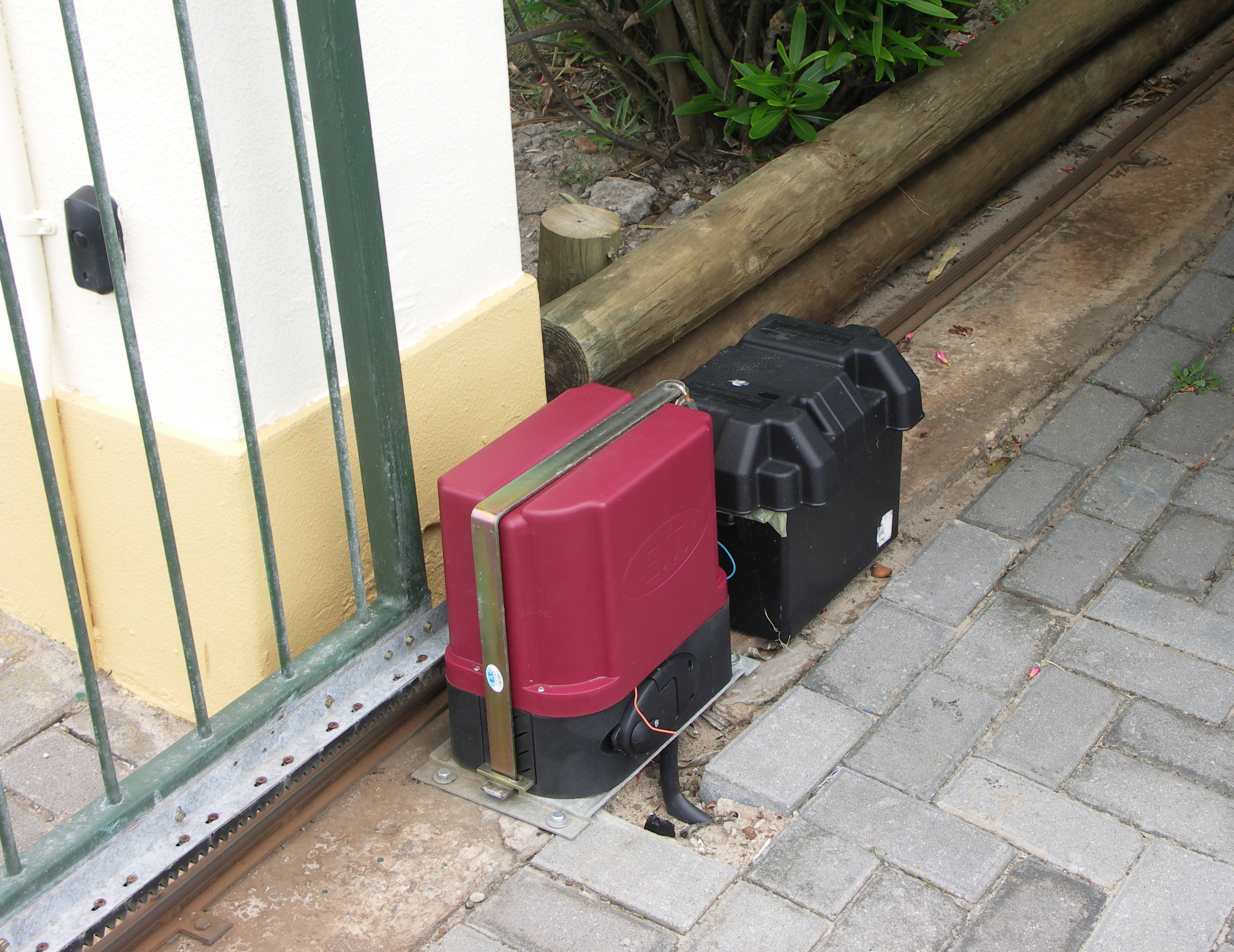
A sliding electric gate with electric motor and backup battery in case of mains failure. Note also the Infrared obstacle sensor located on the wall to prevent the gate from closing while a vehicle or other obstacle is in the way.

Driveway gate openers can be the rollback (sliding) type that retracts a gate along the fence or wall on wheels or bearing, or the swing type that draws the gate open or closed on hinges. They are usually operated by a remote controller or a sensor

=== Articulated ===
Articulated gate openers can be used for gates with wide posts allowing opening in small spaces. An easy system for DIY installers as they are simple to install but not as aesthetically pleasing as other motor designs. Also known as Crank arm operators, they are the main type of automation system sold in France, where low aluminium gates are often used.

=== Underground ===
Under-gate Jack operators usually control the gate by directly moving the pivot point of each gate leaf. This makes the unit ideal cosmetically and also allows for up to 180 degrees of leaf swing as required. However controlling the pivot point of the gate, is like opening a door by twisting the hinge, and as so is very difficult due to the loads needed at that point. This is highlighted with snap, as the gate has to change direct, as soon as it can. For this reason they are recommend as only suitable for ‘Domestic’ systems in a low risk of abuse environment. Another major consideration with the use of under-gate units is that of water immersion/ingress and warranty voidance. If the water table is high or the drainage of the unit's foundation box inadequate throughout the systems life, then water ingress and unit failure is increased.

Ram or link arm units are usually simpler to install and maintain, they are visible to otherwise ignorant abuse and as they fix down along each gate leaf, they also have an obvious and sometimes major, mechanical advantage over Jacks. Therefore, Rams are far more suitable on Multi-user & commercial systems. Also the manual release is always above ground, making it often more user friendly in operation.

=== Sliding ===
If space is an issue or the driveway behind the gates is on a steep incline, a better option would be a sliding gate. Sliding gates are also very popular in a commercial environment. Sliding gates are also used for cantilever gate systems.

== Electric Gate History ==
One of the first electric gates was invented by a Canadian Fred W. Watson in 1881. It was designed to be used for railway systems. In 1884, a number of American newspapers reported that the French railway companies were about to adopt an electric gate opener. “A catch connected with an electro-magnet keeps a gate closed,” reported The National Tribune on October 9, 1884. One of the early demonstrations of such gates in the United States was arranged by the short-lived Toulmin Electric Railway Gate Company in 1887, in Baltimore. At the end of the 19th century, electric gates were also used at horse racing tracks.

The first commercial electric gate systems were hydraulic and designed for reliability and ease of use. The cost of the hydraulic systems however meant that other companies started producing more affordable electromechanical alternatives. Hydraulic motors are the preferred choice on large and heavy gates as they can generate high levels of torque, electromechanical systems designed for lower usage domestic installations because they can be produced more cost effectively.

== The Electric Gate Motor ==
The backbone of any electric gate, whether automatic or not, is the electric gate motor, two distinct motor types exist hydraulic, or electromechanical. This is the electric device which actually enables the electric gate to open and close without having to manually push the gate.

== Electric Gate Safety ==
The safety of an automated gate is an important consideration, in the European Union, automated gate safety is specified by a series of European Normalisations. An automated gate that has not been fitted with safety in mind can potentially become a major hazard particularly to untrained users. Various safety devices are available to make sure that your gates meet the highest of European or American safety standards.

== Gate and Security ==
Since electric gates operate slowly, they are susceptible to "tailgating" threats, in which a person or vehicle sneaks in behind an authorized user. If security is a concern, a video surveillance camera should be installed.

Electric gates alone, however solid and imposing they may be, cannot guarantee a completely secure environment electric locks, are often needed to boost the locking effectiveness of the gate motors. Electric gates are recommended to be used in combination with other security features to install a full security system. A few of these features are closed circuits with security cameras, additional gates in conjunction with the main gate, electronic keycards and keypads, security guards.

Aside from the additional security features that should go with parking barrier gates, electric security gates often offer safety features like sensors that determine when there is an obstruction to prevent the electronic gate from swinging into a vehicle or closing on somebody's hands. To prevent the electronic gates from being damaged by irresponsible drivers driving fast speed bumps are also commonly placed before gate entrances to slow down vehicles.

== Safety Regulations ==
In the United States all the electric gate installations must meet Underwriters Laboratories 325 (UL 325) standard while in Europe installations must meet with the Machinery directive 2006/42/EC with EN13241-1 being the regulations concerning gates.

The installer of the gate is responsible for the conformity to regulation, not the manufacturer. The two main EN regulations that then apply are EN 12453 which describes the safety levels that should be observed when installing a gate and EN12445 which describes the testing method that must be undertaken.

The major points are the maximum amount of force at certain test points. Example - a maximum of 400N of force can be applied in the last 50, 300 and 500 mm of travel of a gate, after the initial impact the force must drop to 150N within 0.75 of a second and reduce to 25N within 5 seconds. During the mid travel of a gate the allowable force is 1400N. A full risk assessment of the gates must take place with all crush, cutting points shown to the client with appropriate protection devices offered, a recommended maintenance program should also be provided. Finally the installer must confirm that all electrical equipment fitted has the European CE mark all the time.

To conform to these regulations the gate system must be checked with a calibrated force tester and the full results kept in a technical file for 7 years. If the gate is not tested it does not comply.

Most gate kits can be fitted with safety equipment so that these limits are achieved and so cover that part of EN13241-1.

In September 2010, following two incidents in Bridgend and Manchester, when children were killed by sliding gates, the UK Health and Safety Executive issued 2 safety notices aimed at gate manufacturers and installers, demanding them to comply with the Annex A of BS EN 12453:2001 standard.
