= Hampshire gate =

Type of gate

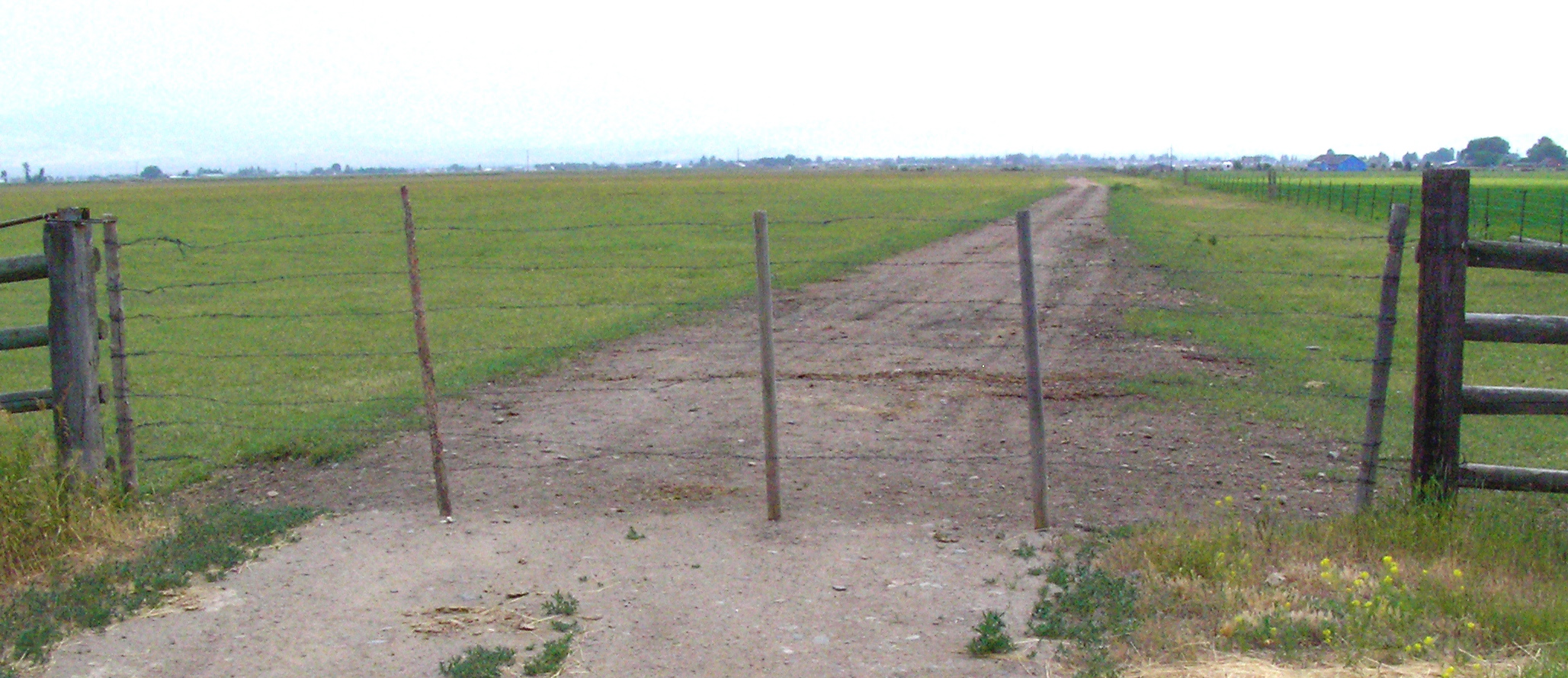
A wire gate, western United States

A Hampshire gate, New Zealand gate or wire gate is a type of agricultural gate formed from a section of wire fence which can be removed temporarily. This type of gate is used where access is only needed occasionally, or when the cost of a conventional rigid gate cannot be justified. It does not require the heavy gateposts needed to support the weight of a rigid gate, it can be adapted to a variety of terrains, it is cheap and simple to make, and if necessary it can easily be made much wider than a conventional gate.

== Terminology ==
This type of gate has many different local names throughout the world, sometimes hinting at its rough-and-ready nature and cheap construction.

The term Hampshire gate is widely used in Britain (including Hampshire) – the names of other counties are occasionally substituted, or more often that of New Zealand. In New Zealand itself it is called a Taranaki gate, named after the Taranaki region of that country, while in Ireland it is known as a slap, and in Australia as a cocky's gate (from the vernacular for "farmer"), bogan gate, running gate, machinery gate or Queensland gate. In the United States it is called a wire gate, portagee gate (Coastal California), New Zealand gate, Texas gate, and other local terms.

Though the origins of the gate are obscure, the name Taranaki gate is believed to reflect the location of its first widespread use; it may well have been invented independently in several places. Most likely, however, is that the common barbed wire version was originally used in the United States, the place where barbed wire was invented.

== Composition ==
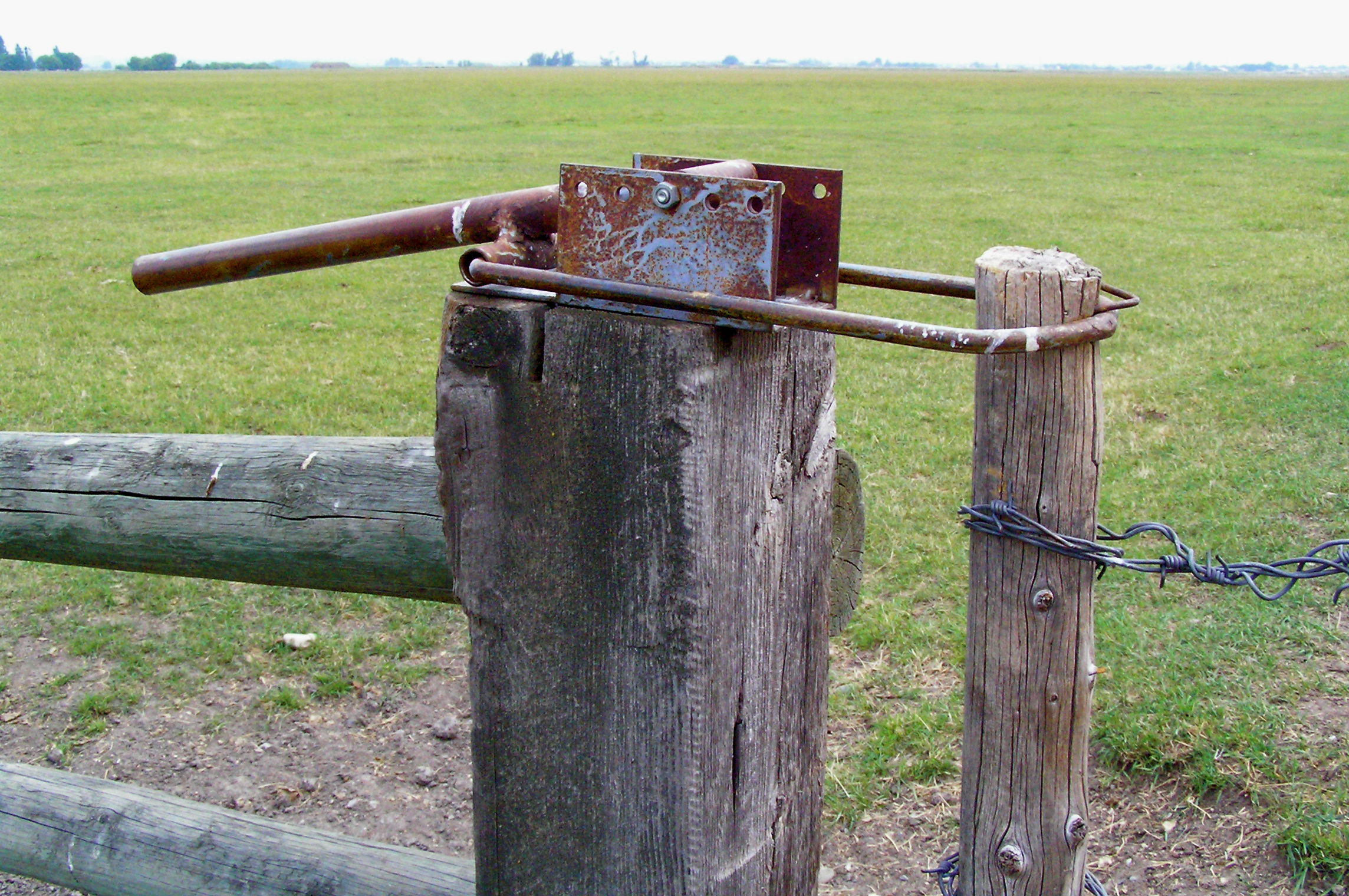
One type of gate latch that provides additional leverage, making the gate easier to tension.

A Hampshire gate occupies a gateway in a fence similar to that used for a conventional gate. However, instead of a rigid gate, a short section of loose wire fence fits into the gap – this may consist of wire netting or barbed wire, and it usually matches the adjacent fence. One end of the wire is attached permanently to the main fence, and two or more short posts or battens keep it upright and flat – one of these is at the loose end. When the "gate" is closed, this end post fits into a loop of wire at the base of the fixed fence, and the top is then pulled tight to tension it. The top of the post may be held by another loop of wire, or additional tension may be provided by a length of chain looped around the post and hooked onto a nail. A lever-lock gate replaces the upper wire loop with a wooden lever. Proprietary closures are also available which give still greater tension, usually by means of an over-centre mechanism (see photo below).

If use is likely to be very rare (perhaps only in emergencies), the gate may be wired shut for security – an emergency then only requires the cutting of the securing wire, not cutting the fence itself. When open, the Hampshire gate is folded back against the adjacent fence to avoid it becoming entangled with animals, people, or machinery.

== Usage ==
Typical uses for a Hampshire gate include giving occasional access between adjacent landowners, giving access to small woods for forestry operations, rotational grazing, or allowing unusually large traffic to bypass a normal route. In the American West, it is extremely common in rural areas, particularly on ranches, where it is the most frequently used type of gate used between pastures, and in fencelines separating rangeland of different owners, or separating public and private land.

== See also ==
- Bump gate
- Cattle grid (a.k.a. cattle guard)
- Kissing gate
- Stile
