= Gatepost =

A gatepost is a structure used to support gates or crossbars which control entry to an area, such as a field or driveway.

== Purpose ==
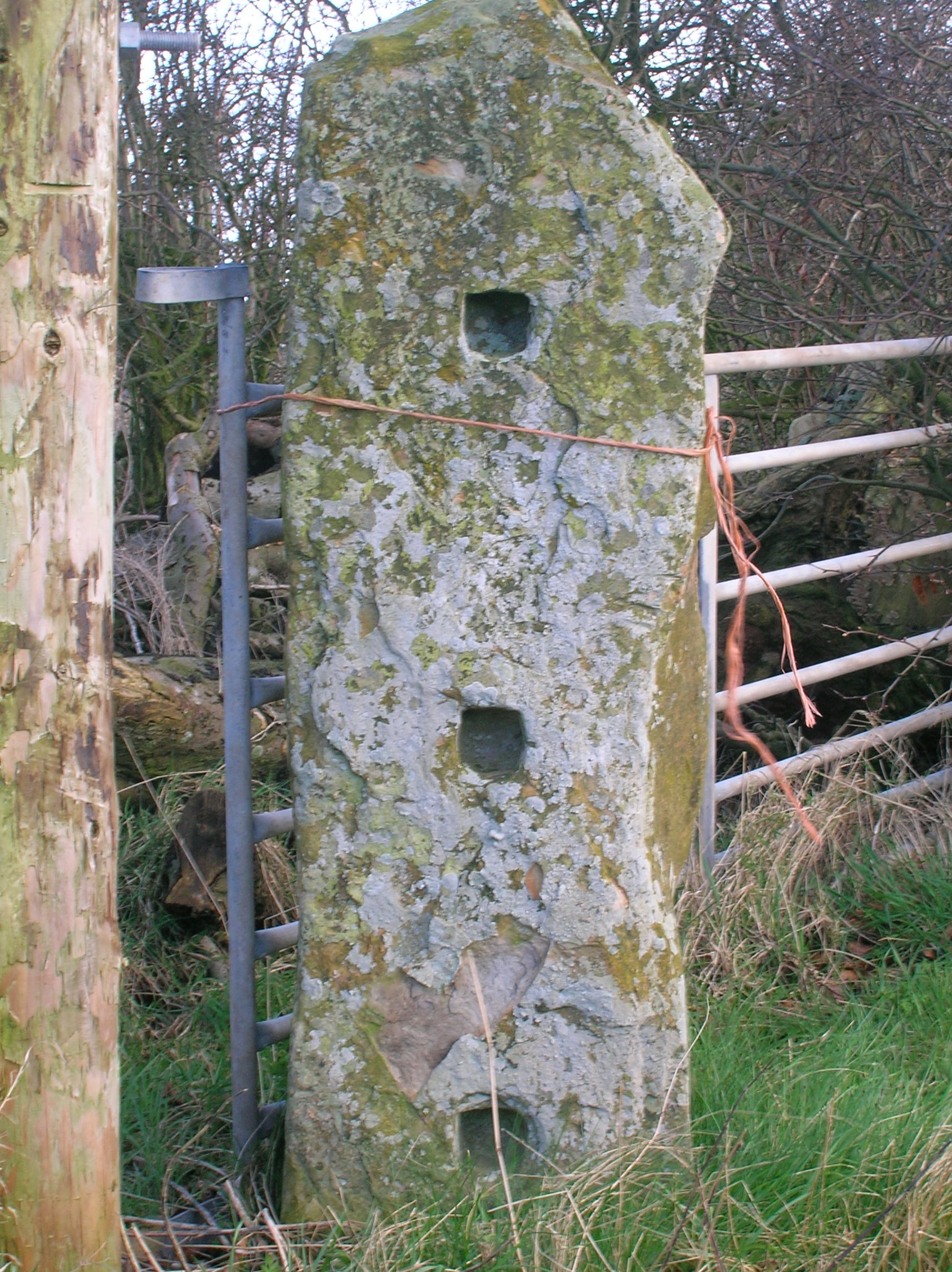
A stile at Busbiehill, North Ayrshire. 2007.

If the gatepost is utilitarian in purpose then gateposts will be made as strictly functional structures; however as part of the 'advertisement' of the status of the family who live beyond, they are often carefully designed and constructed and sometimes highly ornate or individualistic. Gateposts give an additional element of character to the countryside and conurbations, significantly they also play host a habitat for many lichen, moss and liverwort species.

== Construction materials ==
They are often made of wood, such as old railway sleepers, telegraph poles or even tree trunks. For a longer 'life' more resilient iron girders or pipes may be used and concrete posts are sometimes employed. The older examples were often made of stone, such as granite, whinstone, sandstone or limestone. Occasionally standing stones have been moved and re-used as gateposts, especially on Dartmoor and in Cornwall. Bricks are frequently used and some are made from stones or small boulders, tending to be cylindrical in shape.

== Slip gate piers and stoups ==
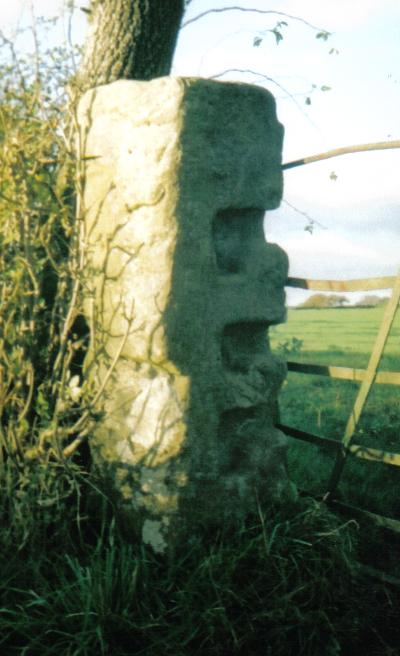
L-shaped grooves to slide in the crossbar.

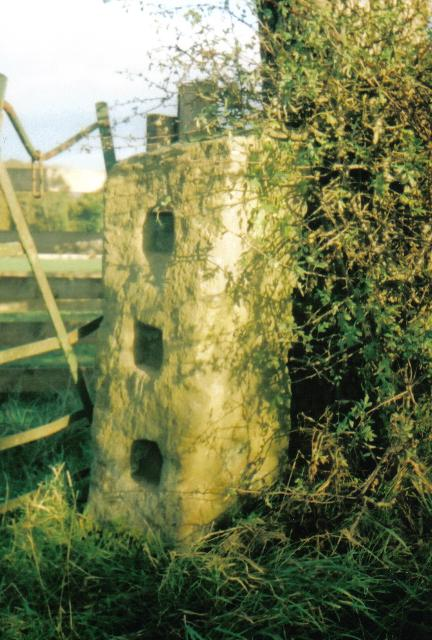
Square concavities to receive the horizontal crossbars

Slip gates are a form of gate which permits people and vehicles through an entrance but which blocks the passage of animals. Branches or worked wood crossbars or stangs were used, one field slip gate pier with L-shaped grooves and the opposing stile gatepost with square or circular concavities to receive the three or four horizontal crossbars. Most of these have long been converted to carry hinged gates, though one survives unaltered at the Museum of Scottish Rural Life, Kittochside on Wester Kittochside farm, East Kilbride, Scotland. They were sometimes made entirely of wood, such as oak, which is relatively long lasting.

The term 'Stoup' is used in Cumbria and some examples are elaborately finished, with dates and initials and even whole names, sometimes with the sort of flowing script more usually found on gravestones. One example is dated as far back as 1663.

The shape of the stile gateposts is variable, mostly being oblong and square in section; however, some were tombstone-shaped, having two flat sides and a curved top.

== Gatepost designs ==
=== Ornate gateposts ===
A view of the Lodge at Robertland with four gateposts. Circa 1930.

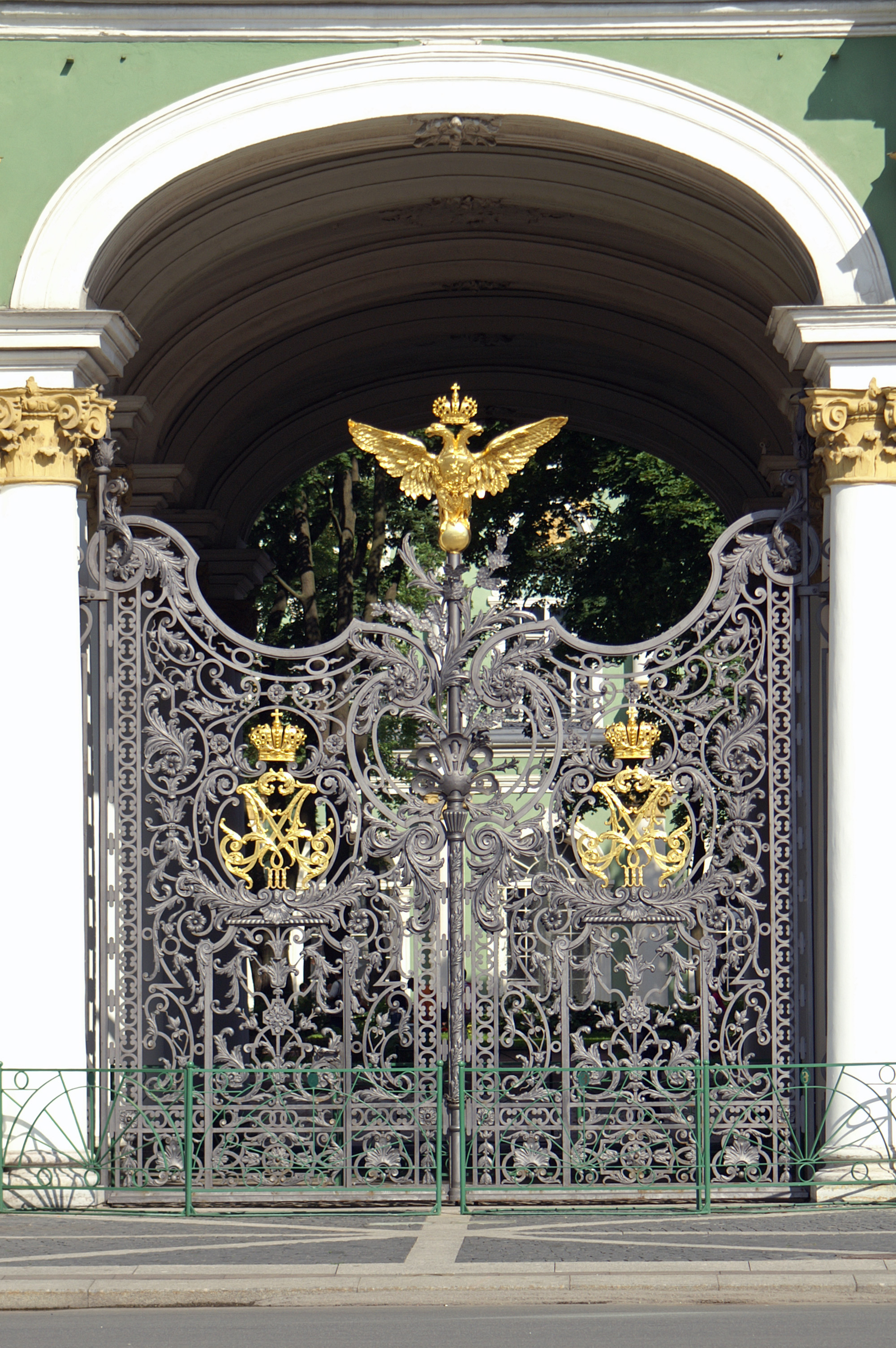
Gate of the Winter Palace in St Petersburg.

Many houses have driveways of varying lengths and gateposts are a way of making a social statement of status, through the cost implications of an ornate or 'awe inspiring' entrance way.

Some entrances had two or even three gates attached to the gateposts, such as at Robertland House in East Ayrshire, Scotland, the side gates being for the use of pedestrians. The gates themselves could be wood or more commonly cast iron, wrought iron or mild steel. A large number of the cast-iron gates were removed by the Ministry of Works in World War II to be melted down and used to build weapons, etc. Once removed these gates were rarely replaced.

A sign of very high status was to have sufficient wealth to have gatehouses or lodges near the gates. Some estates had several lodges and the owners would at one time have employed people to live in these buildings and their jobs would be to open and close the gates, thereby controlling the movements of livestock and also of visitors, some of whom would be denied access or directed way from the front door to the tradesman's entrance.

The date of construction can often be deduced from the style, many being Victorian, due to the wealth creation of the period and the number of large dwellings consequently constructed. Large balls, looking like finials are sometimes precariously perched on top of gateposts, as at Woodway House in Teignmouth, South Devon.

=== Estate gateposts ===
Country estates, usually having one owner, tend to show a degree of uniformity in the design of gateposts, which were mostly purchased at the same time. Different estates can sometimes be 'mapped' by the gateposts used, various designs being supplied for the different landowners to choose from. It may be that the same suppliers also made milestones for the turnpike trusts as the two are sometimes of very similar appearance.

Many gateposts have been removed to allow for the access of larger modern farm machinery, sometimes only one has been moved and the other left in situ.

== Examples of gateposts ==
Woodway House with its granite gateposts and the cast-iron gates which survived being cut up during WW2.

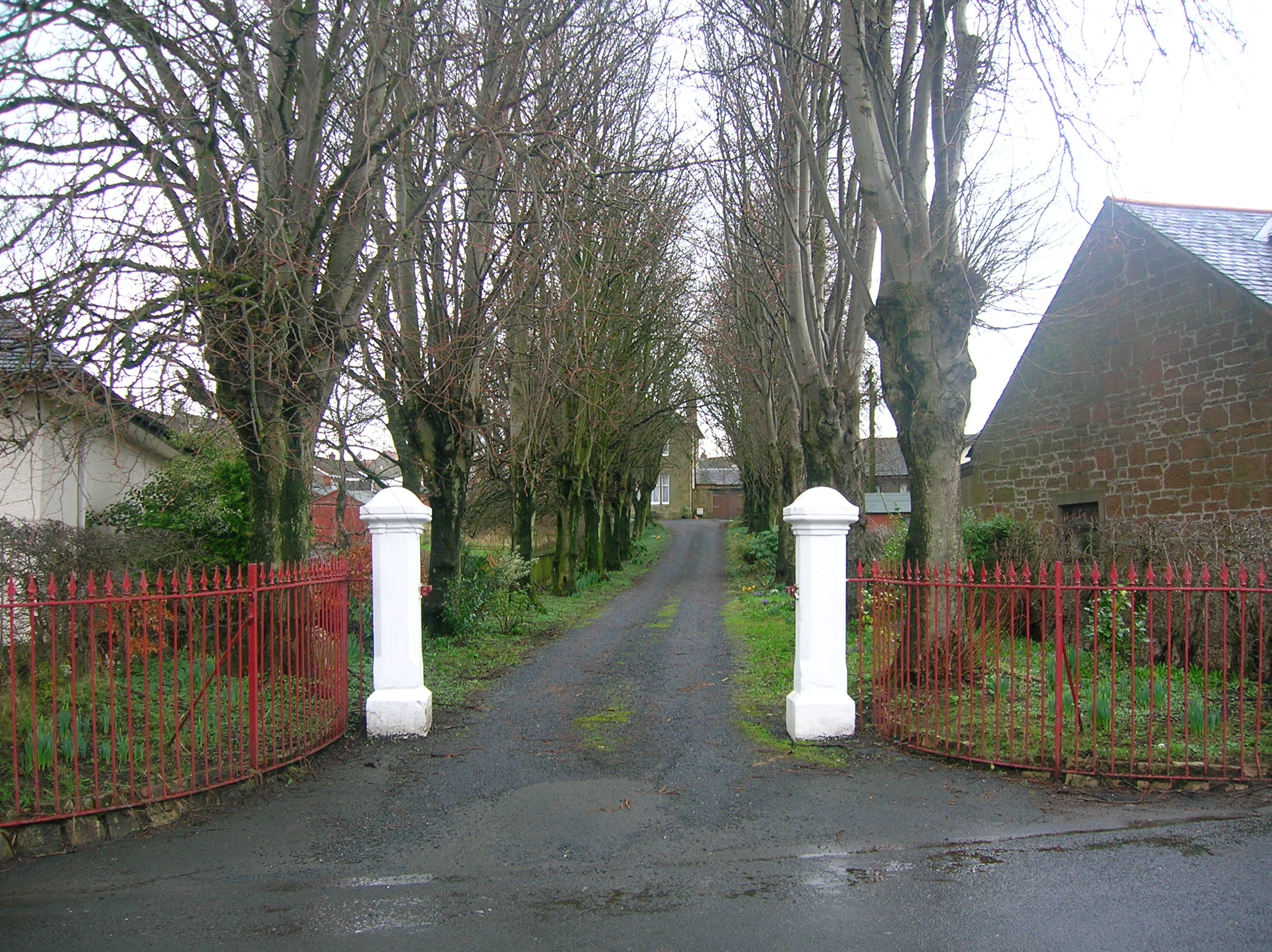
Painted gateposts and pollarded trees on a driveway in Kilmaurs, Ayrshire.

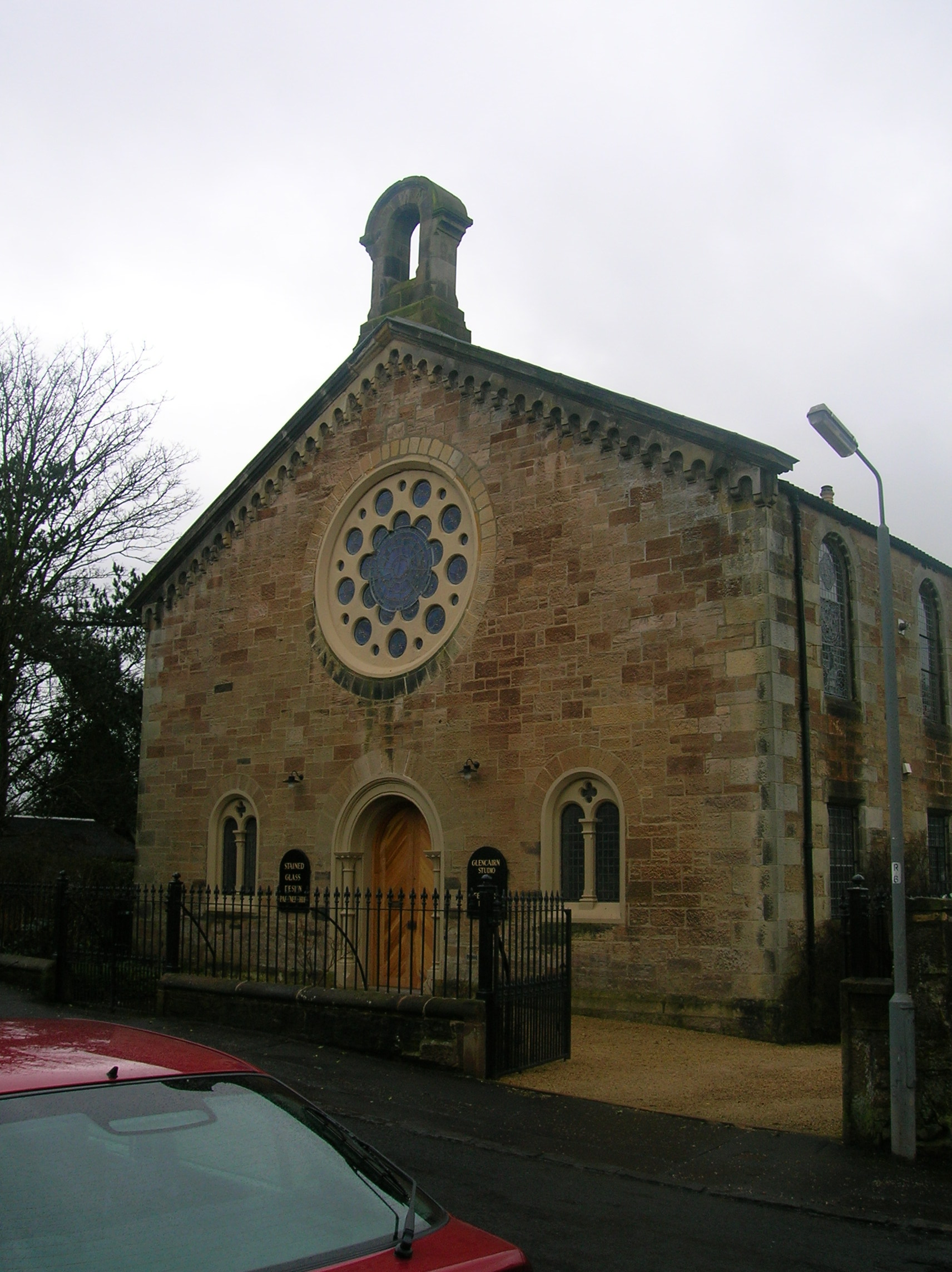
Glencairn Kirk in Kilmaurs with a cast-iron fence and gateposts.

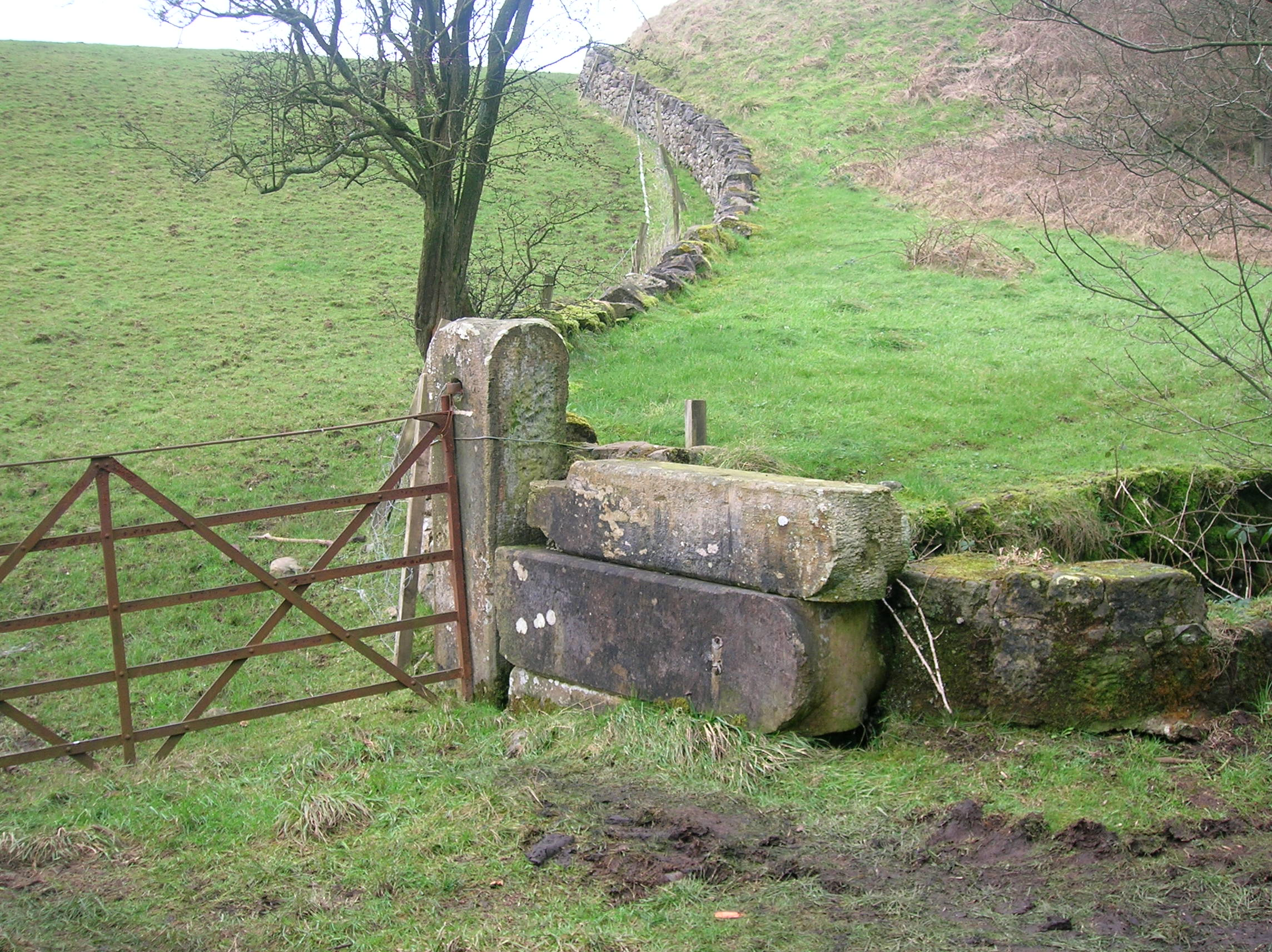
The old gateposts from the demolished Chapelton House at Chapeltoun, Stewarton, Ayrshire.

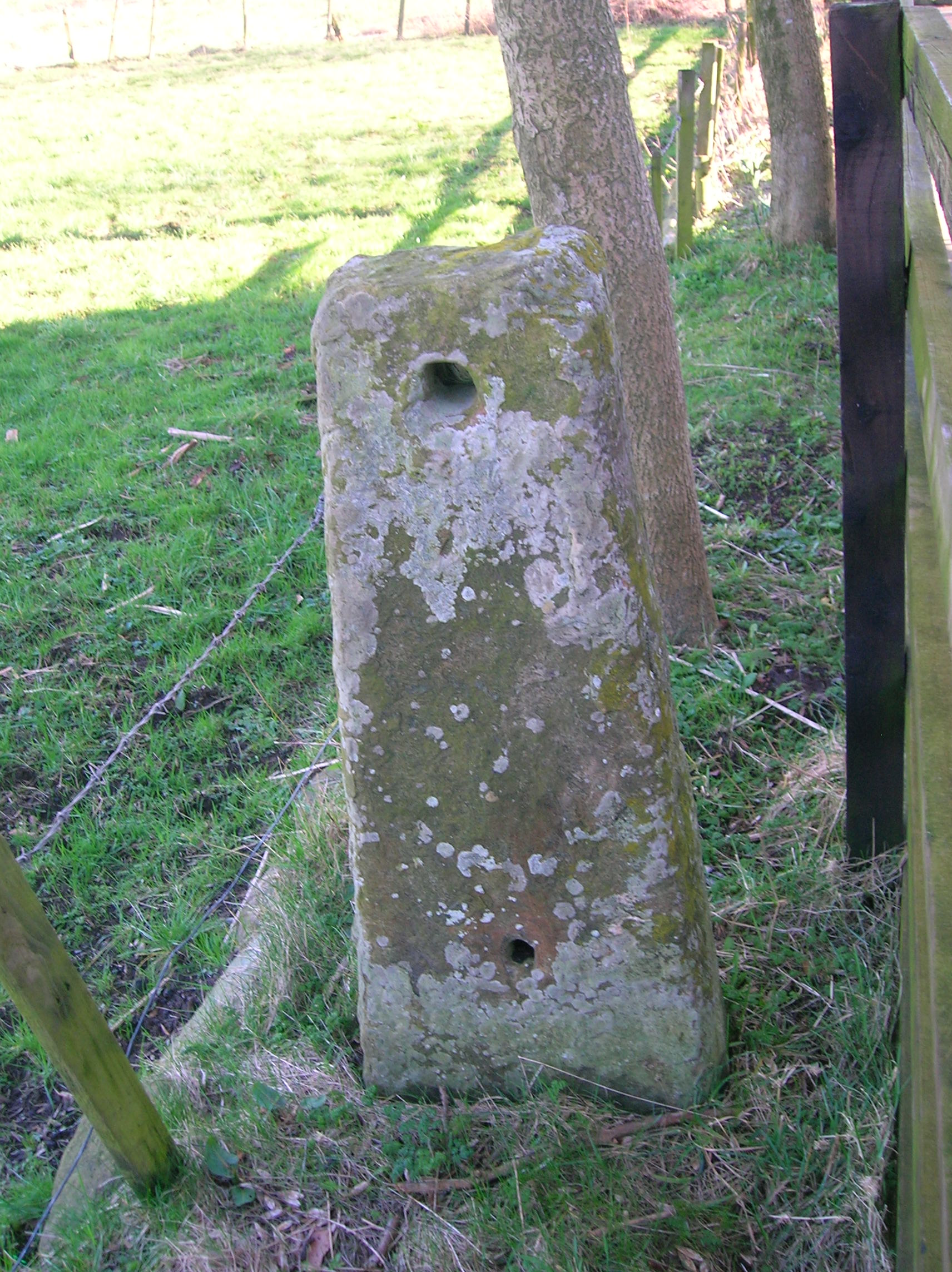
A gatepost at Chapeltoun Terrace, North Ayrshire. Originally from Floors Farm. A perfect habitat for lichens. mosses and algae. 2007.

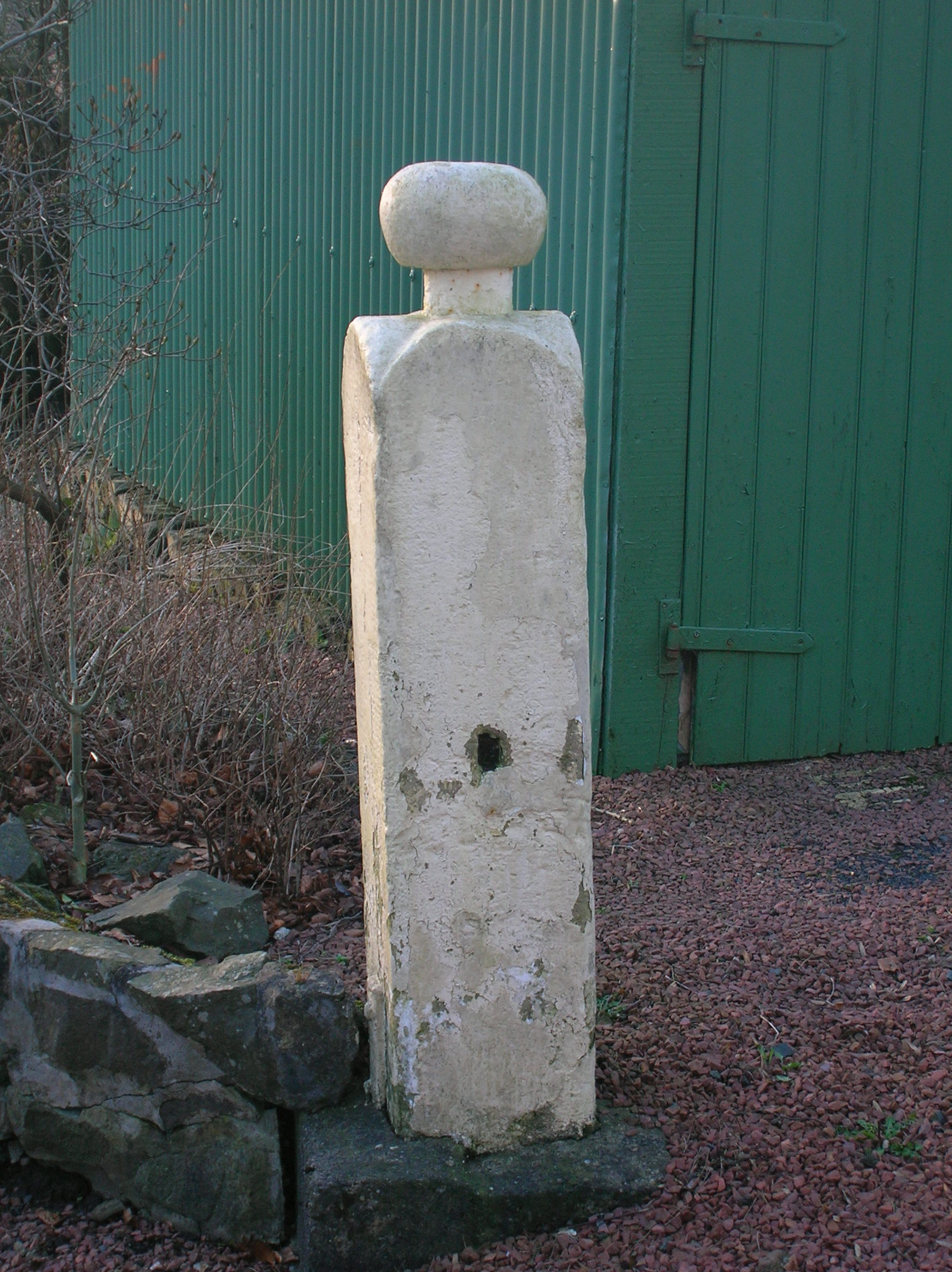
A gatepost with a Curling Stone top.

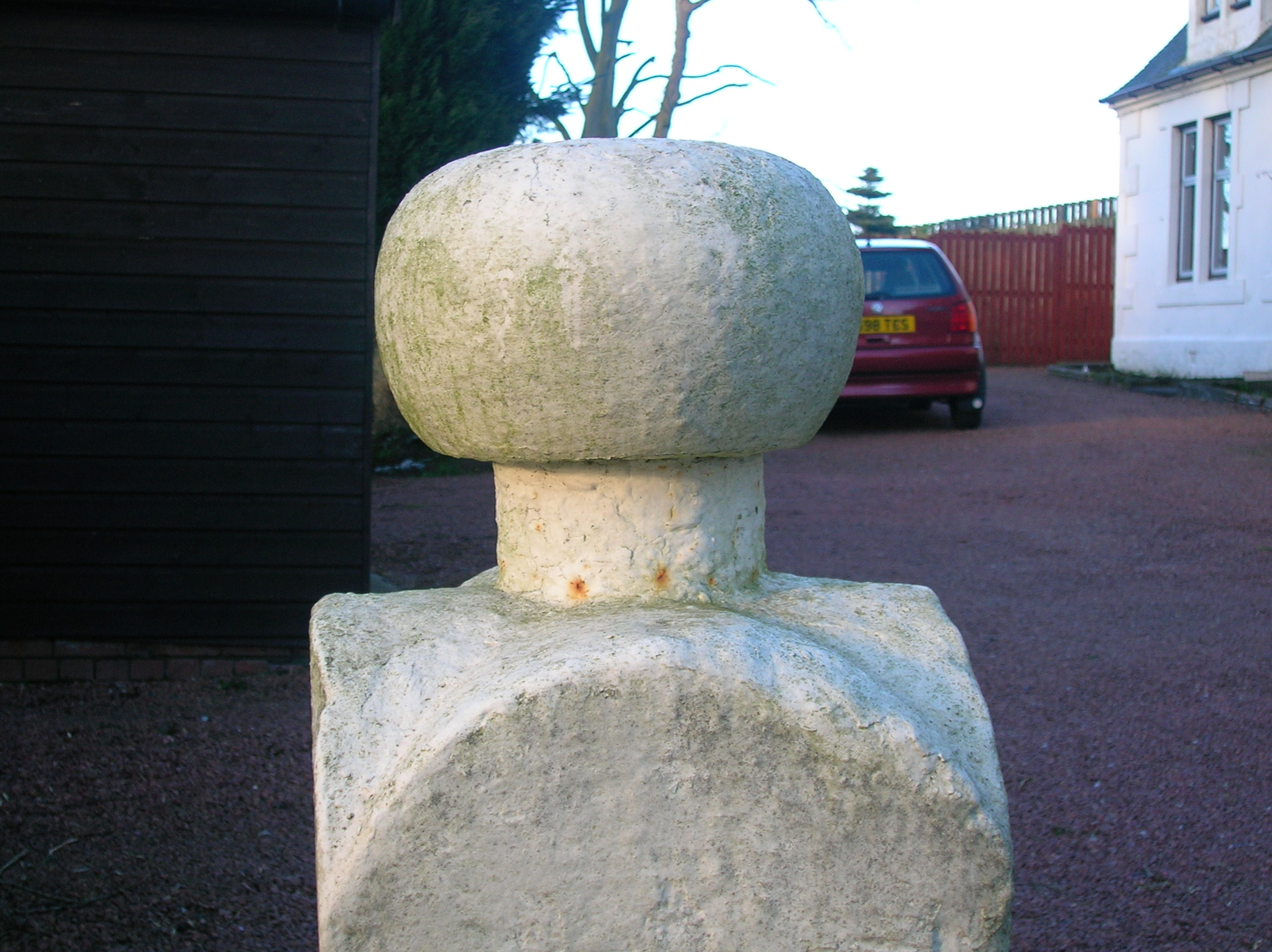
Detail of a curling stone on top of a gatepost at Cutstraw in Stewarton, East Ayrshire. 2007.

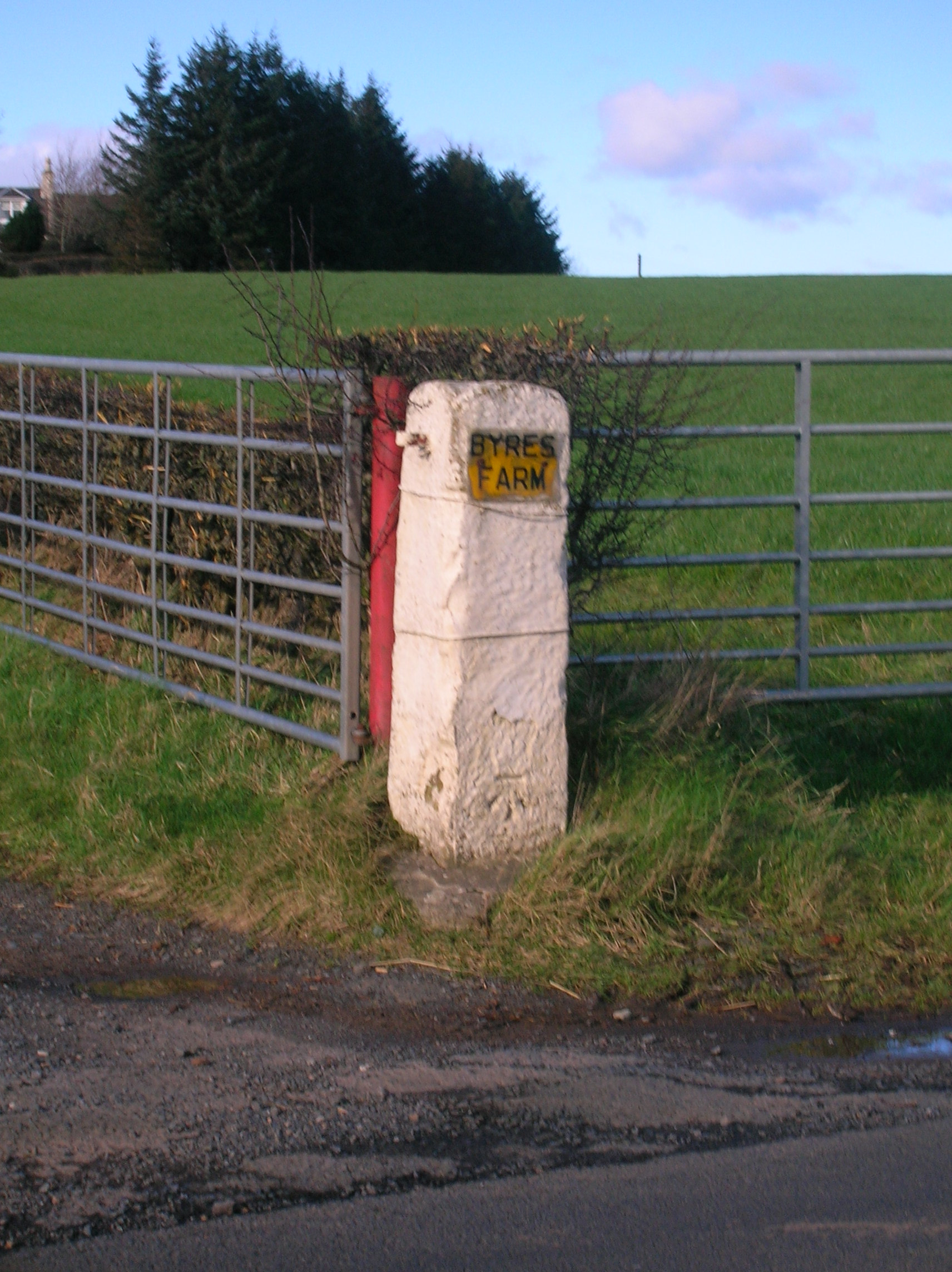
A gatepost at Byres Farm, North Ayrshire. 2007.

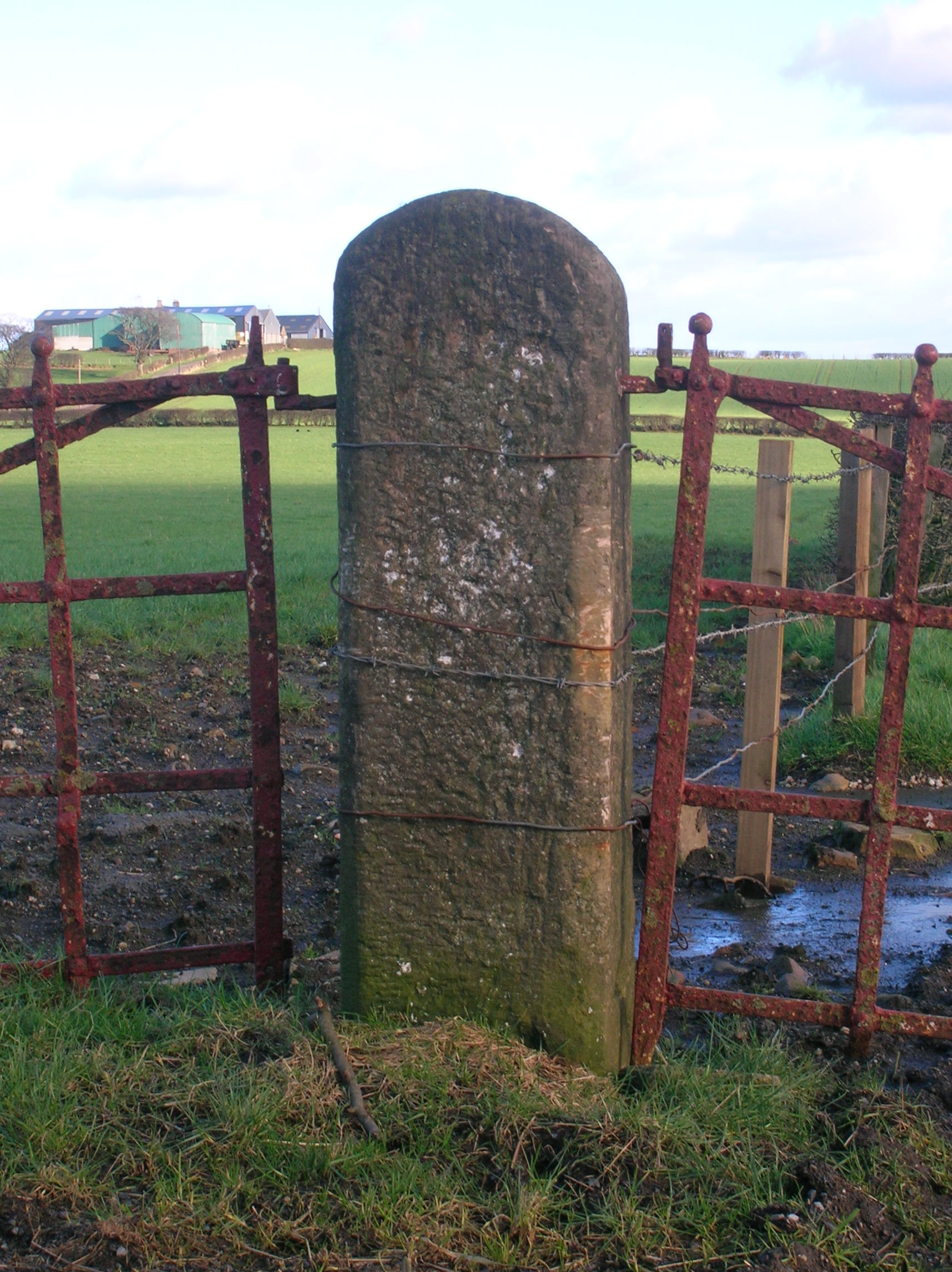
A double gatepost at Warwickdale Farm, Springside, North Ayrshire. 2007.

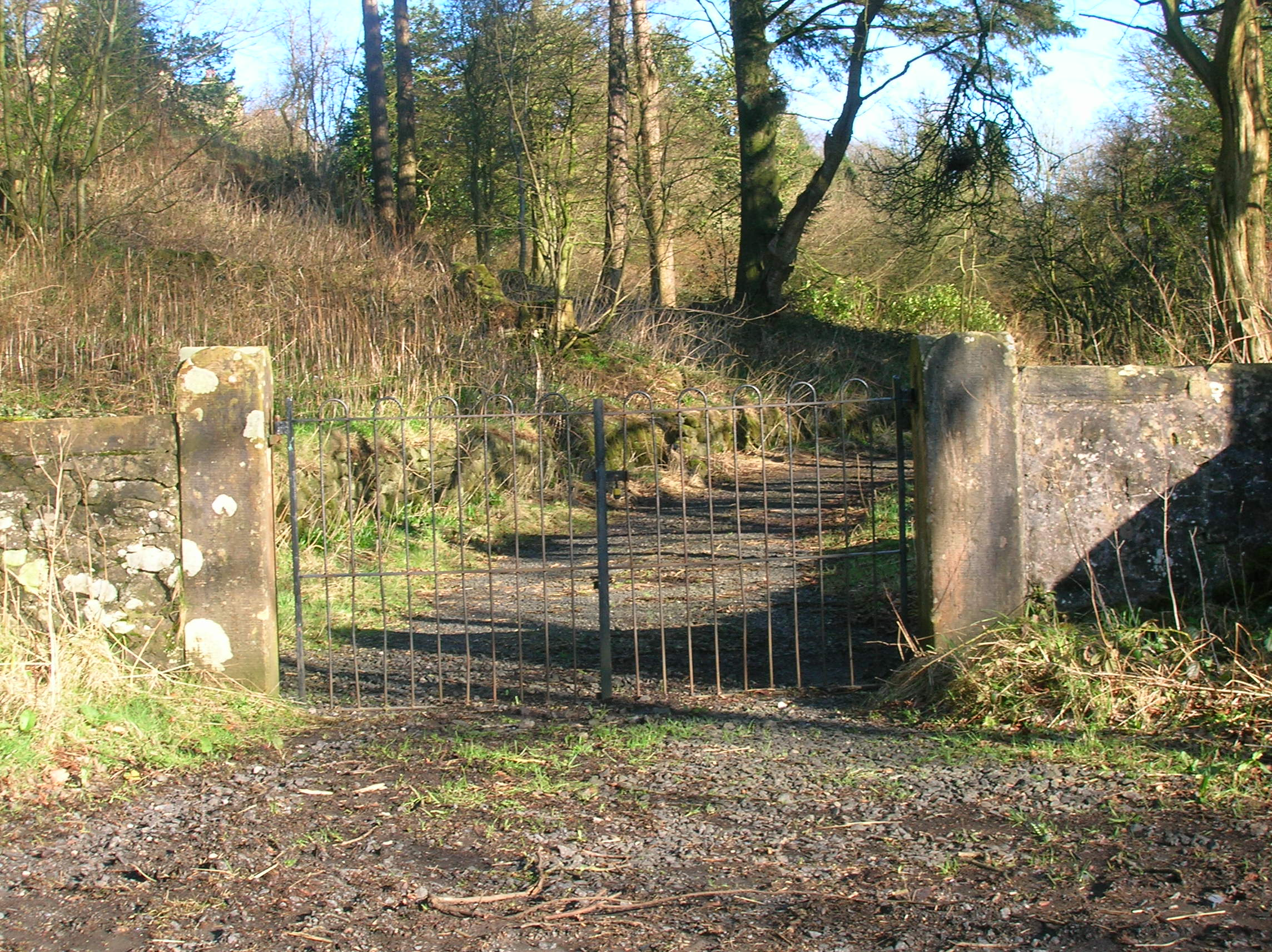
The old side entrance gate to the old Chapelton House, Chapeltoun, East Ayrshire. 2007.

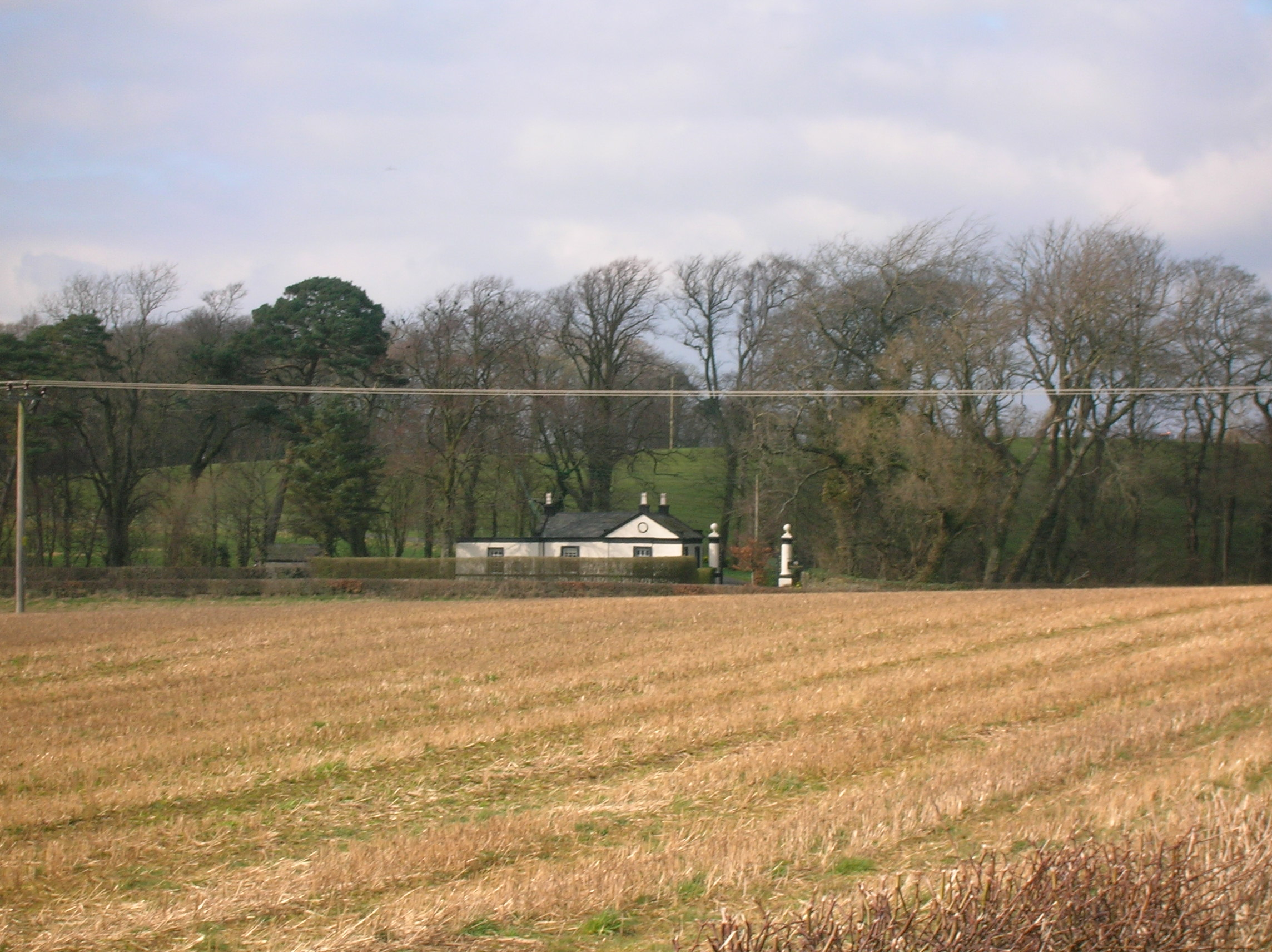
The lodge house and gates at Fairlie House, South Ayrshire.

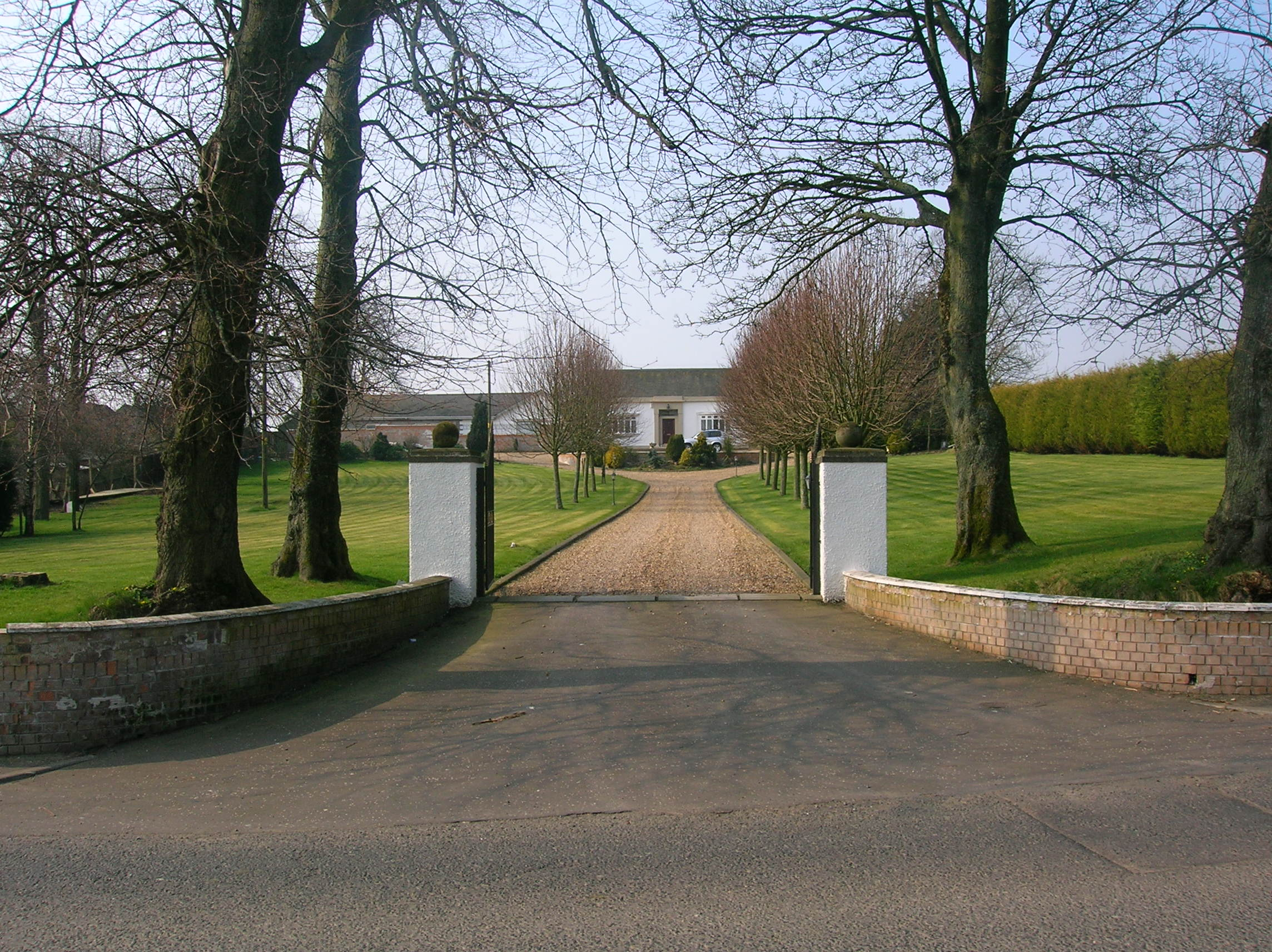
Knockentiber House, North Ayrshire. 2007.

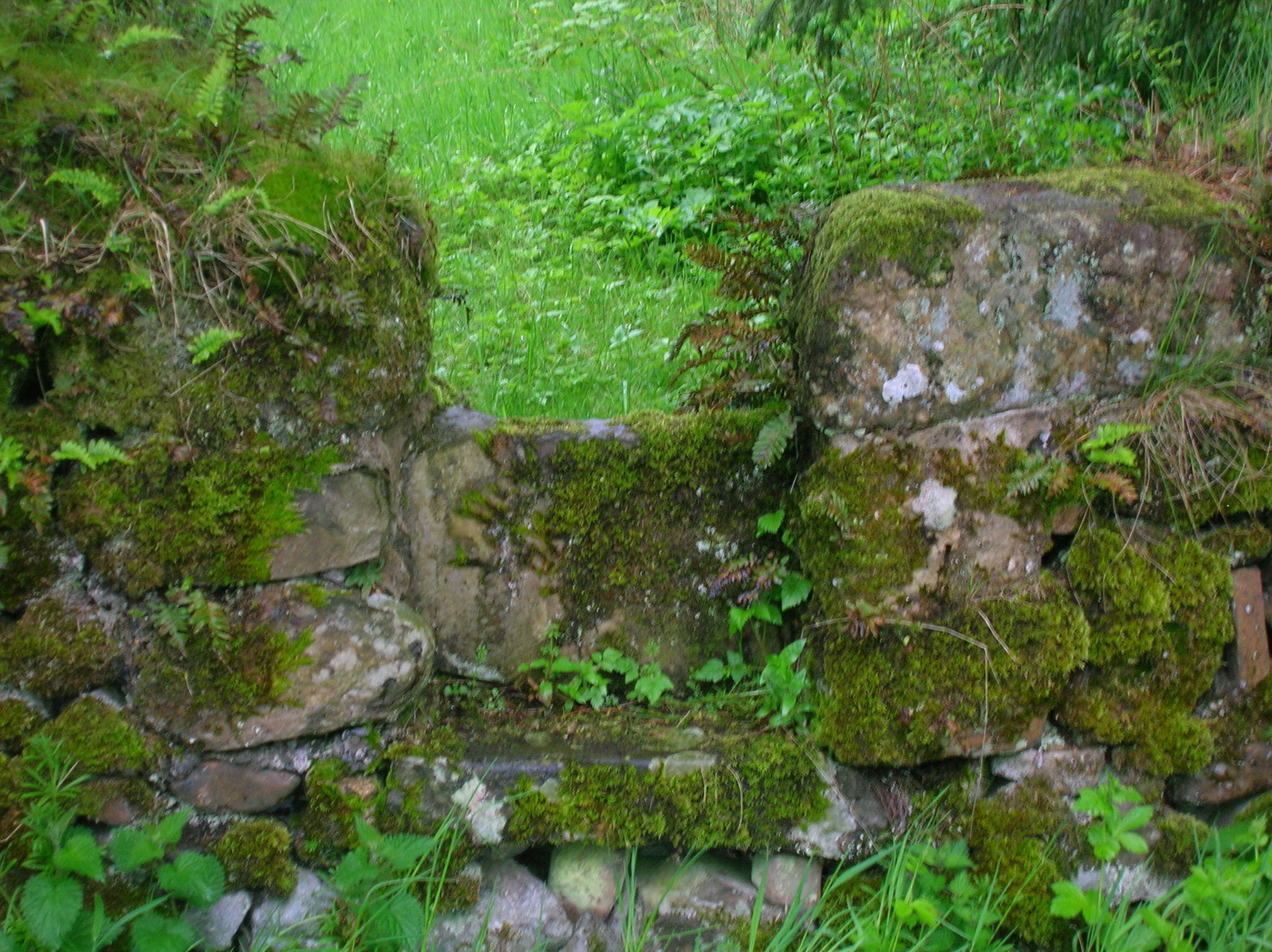
An old stile at 'The Hill' farm, Dunlop, Ayrshire, Scotland.

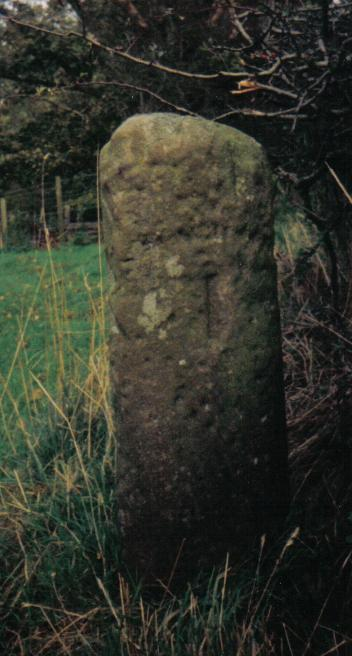
The Law Mount Milestone near Castleton Farm, Stewarton, East Ayrshire.

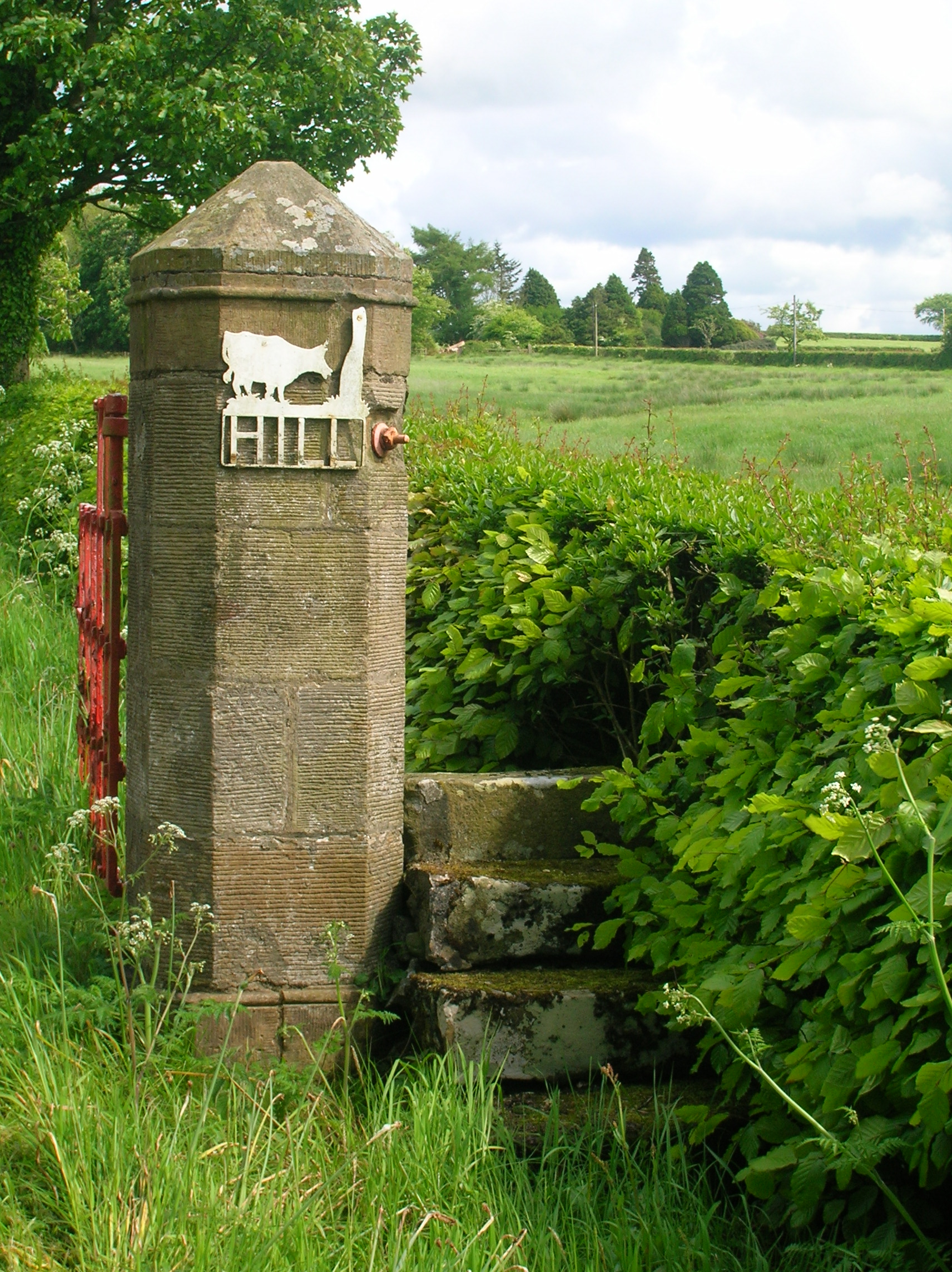
The gatepost and pedestrian steps combination at The Hill farm, Dunlop, East Ayrshire.

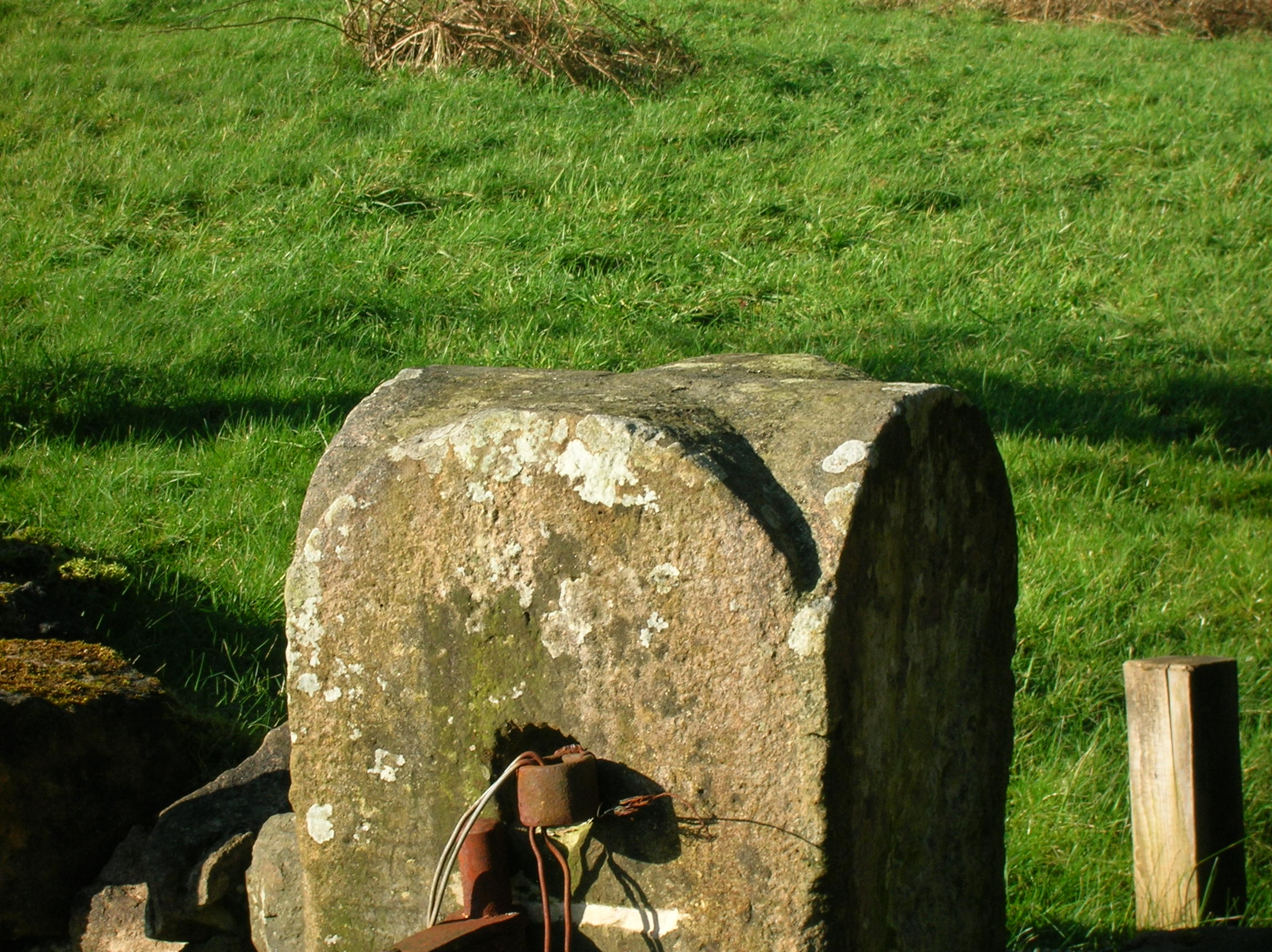
Detail of the top of a gatepost at Chapeltoun, East Ayrshire.

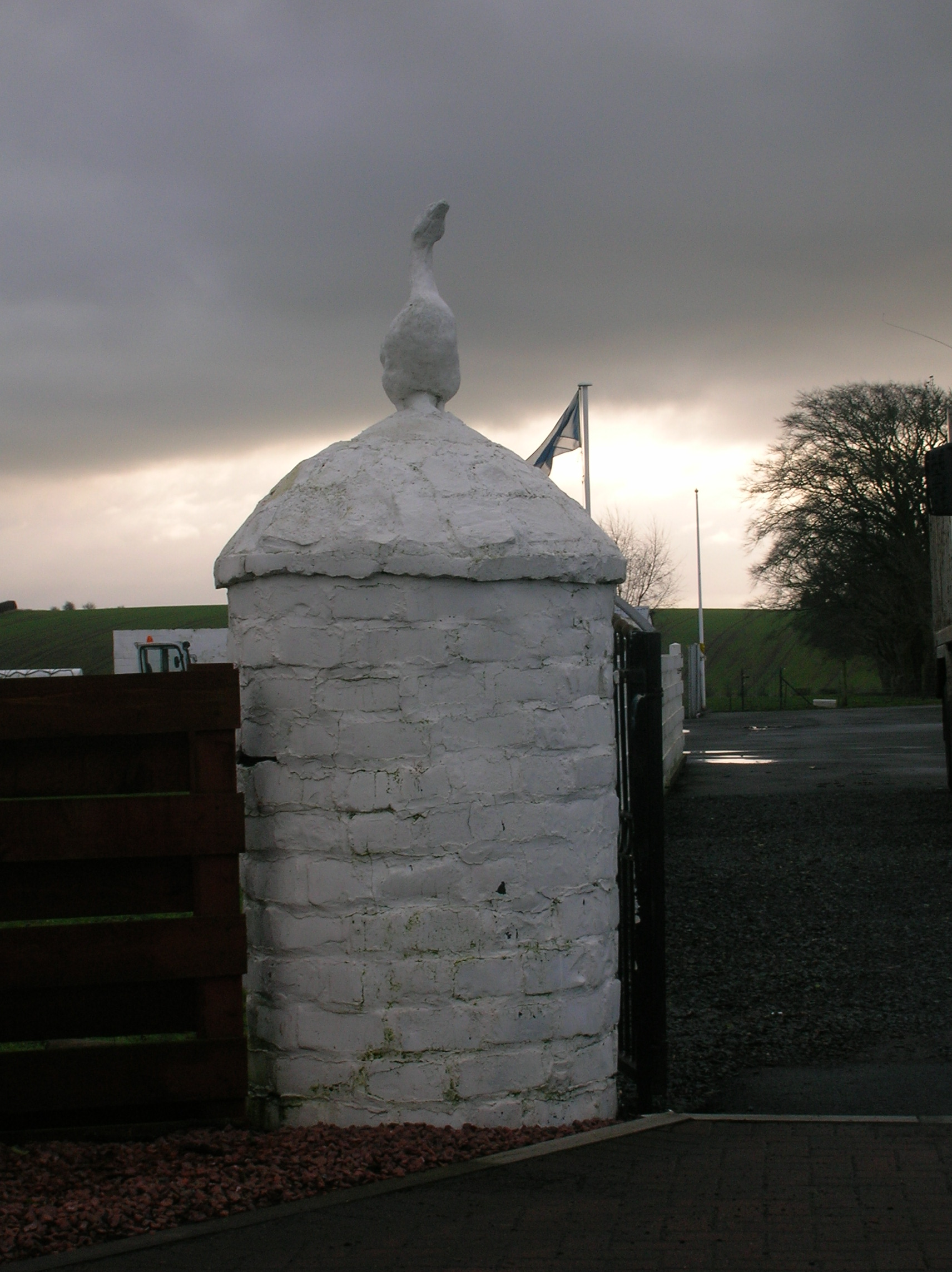
A goose atop a gatepost at Overtoun Farm, North Ayrshire.

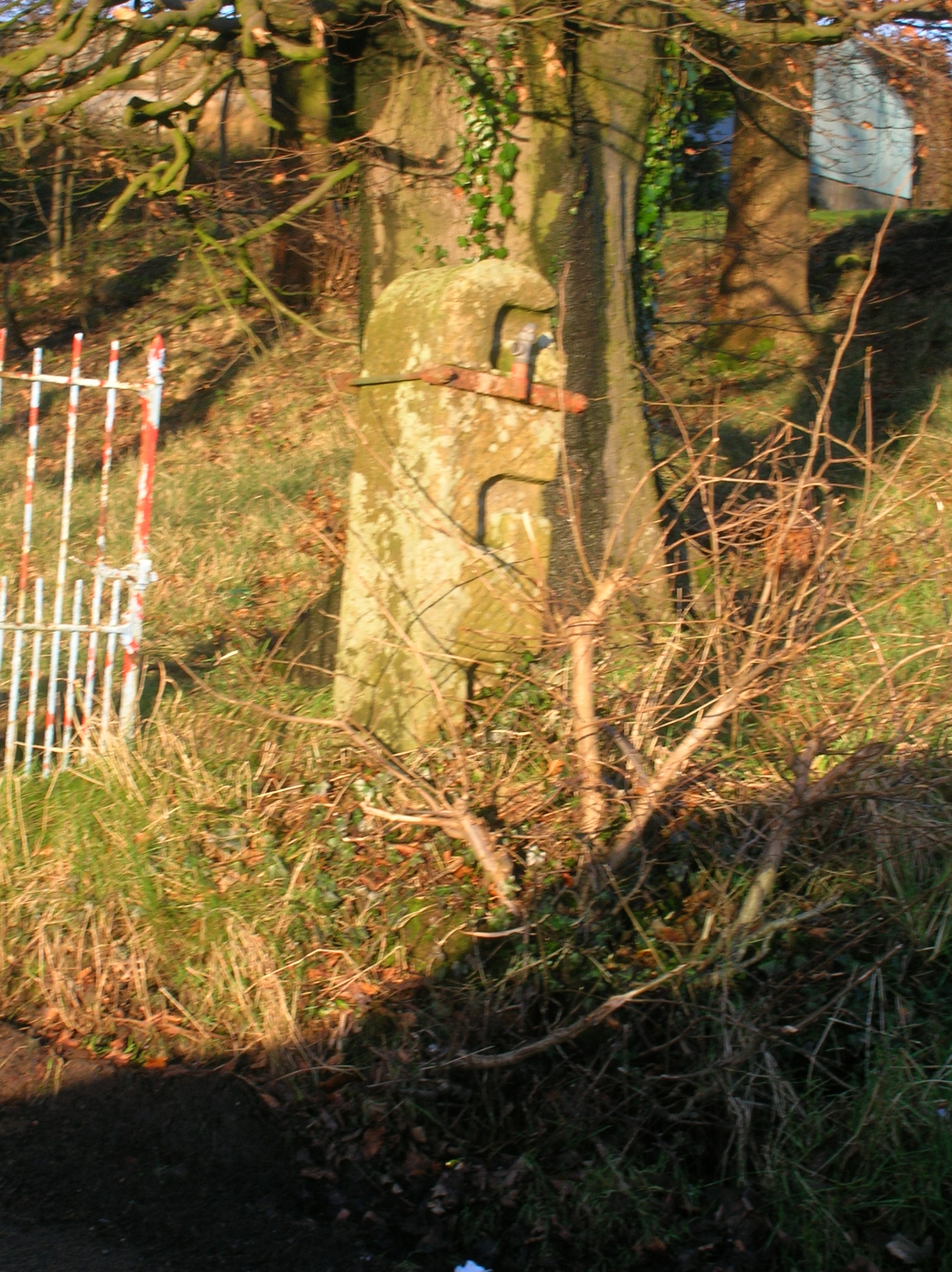
An unusual stile at The Kerse, Beith, North Ayrshire.

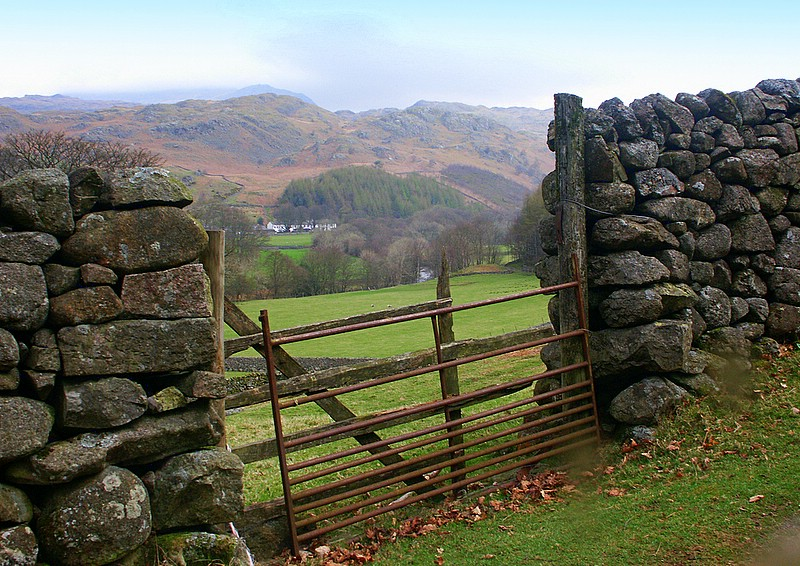
An old gateway in Eskdale, Cumbria

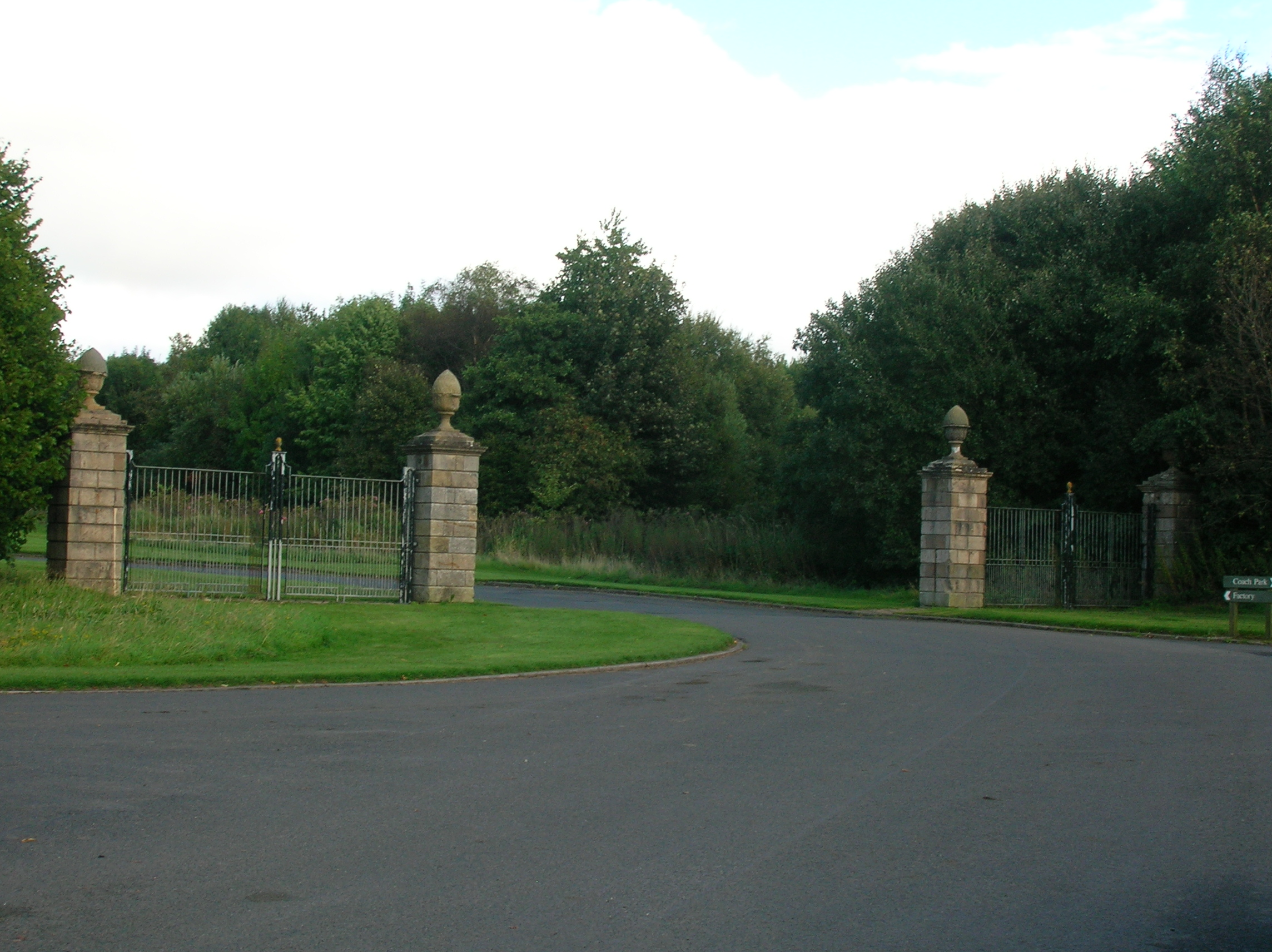
The restored Belvedere or 'Egg Cup' gates at Eglinton Country Park, Ayrshire.

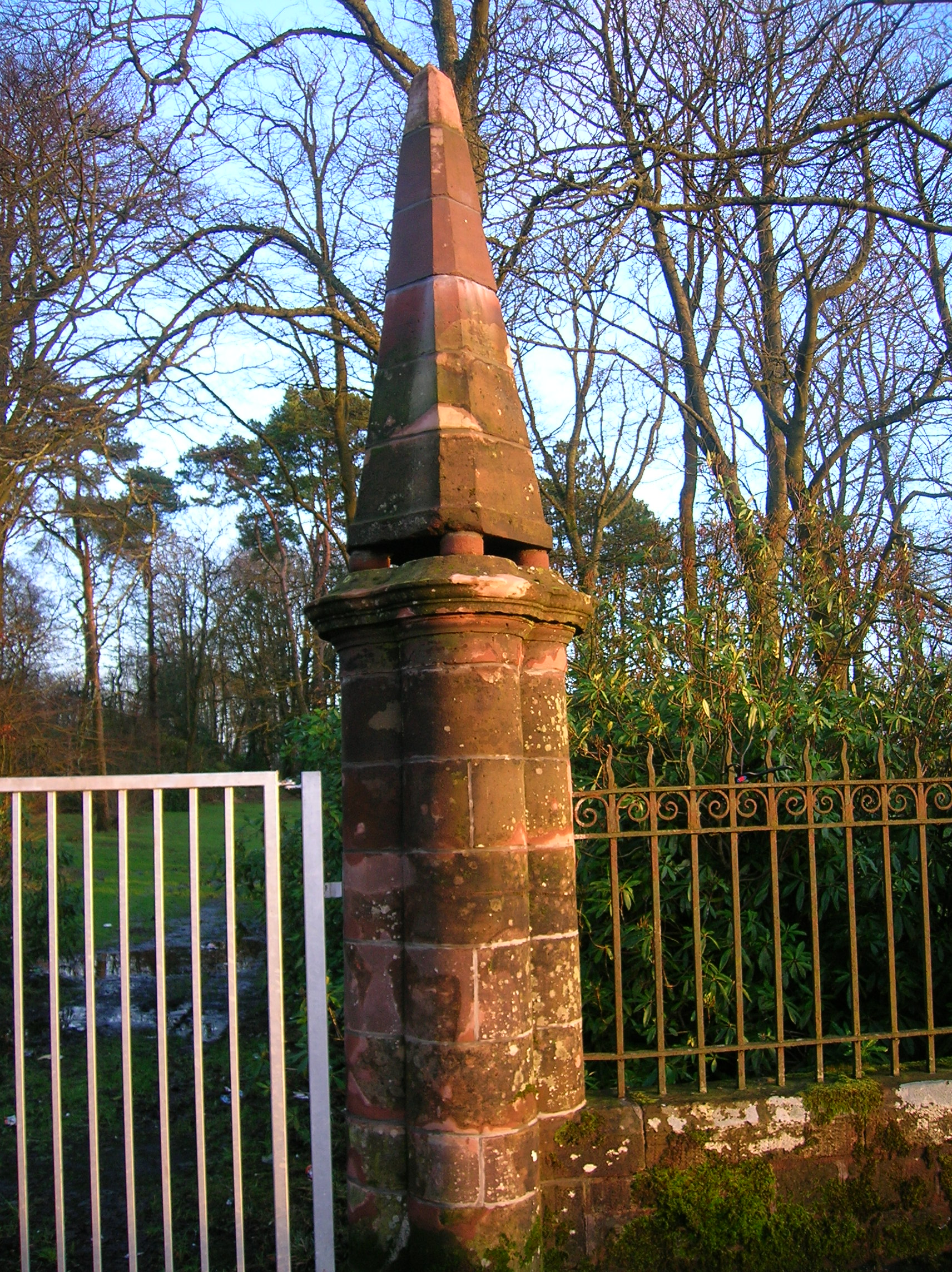
Detail of the gatepost at Speir's school, Beith.

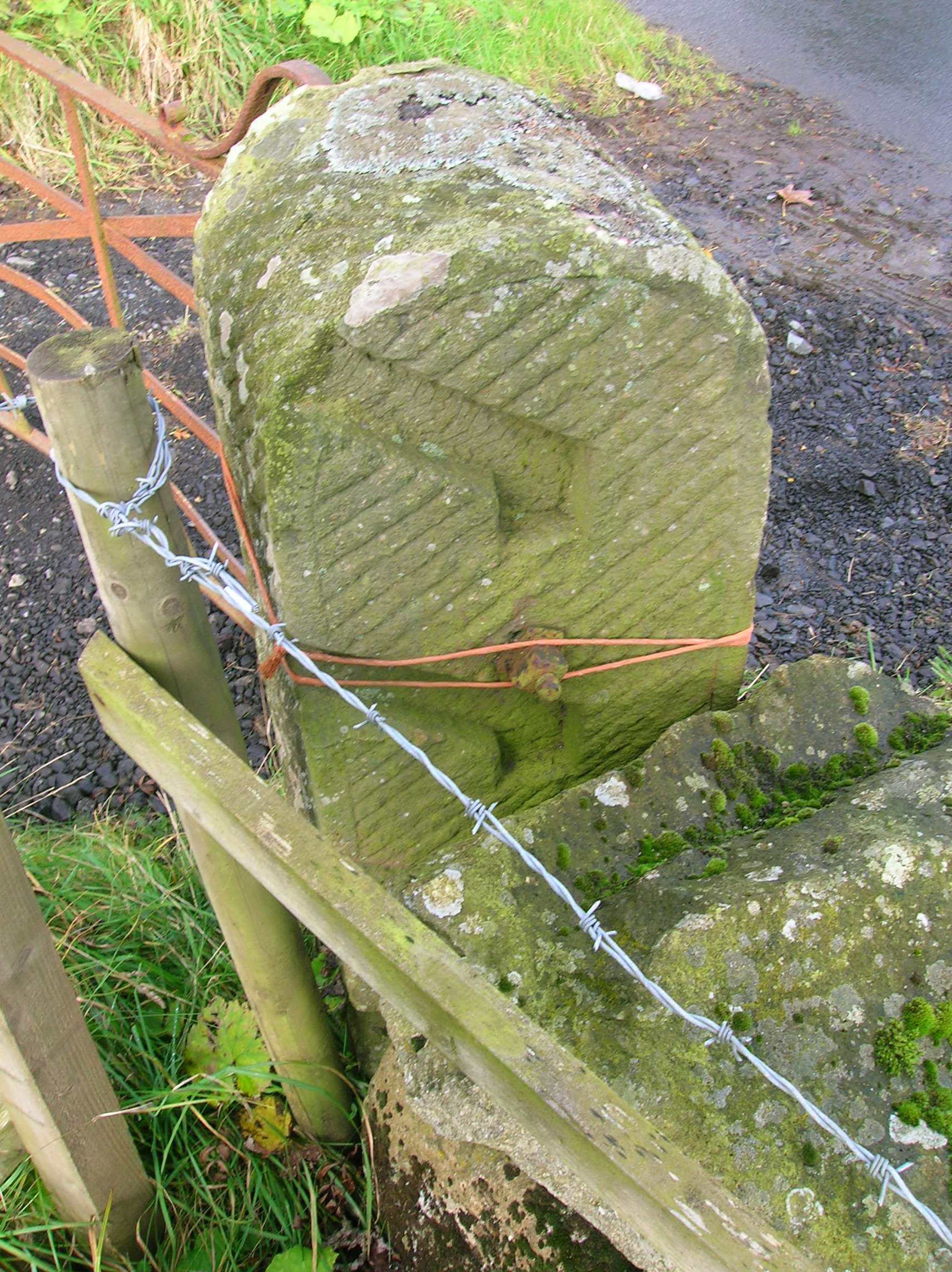
A stile with unusual slots at Flashwood Farm, Darly, Scotland.

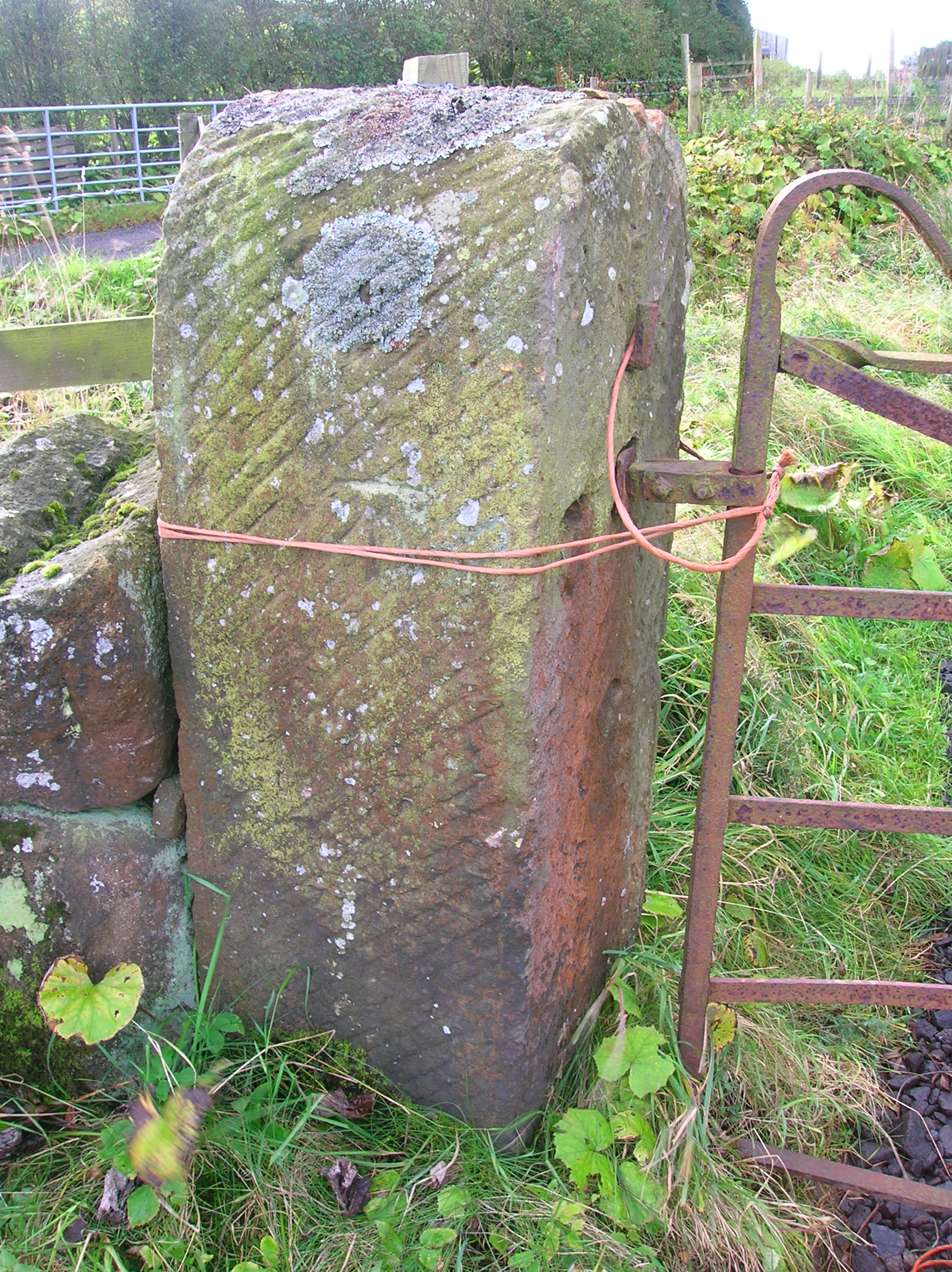
The Flashwood stile.

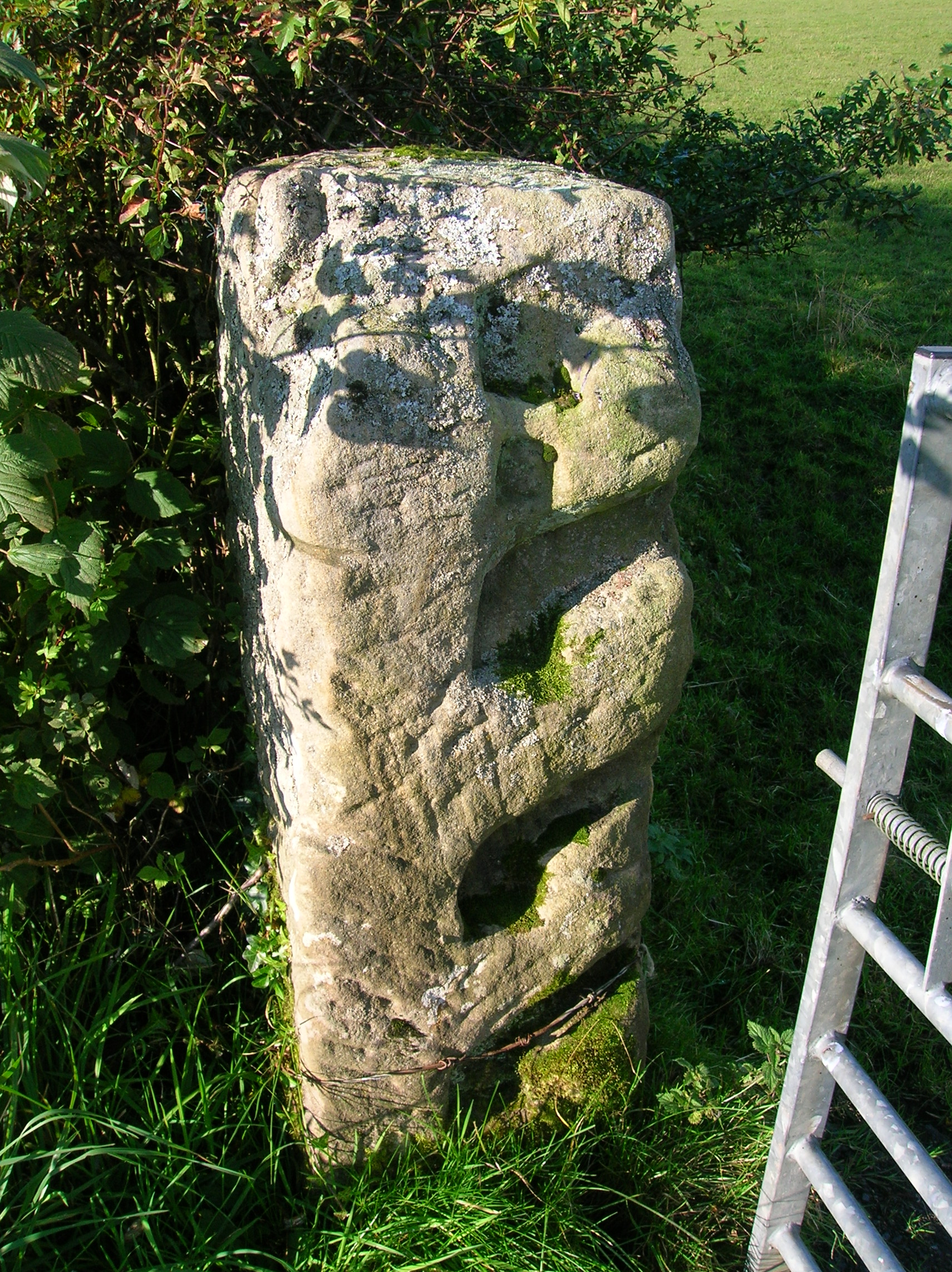
The Cunningham Baidland Farm stile, Dalry, Scotland.

=== Examples of gatehouses ===
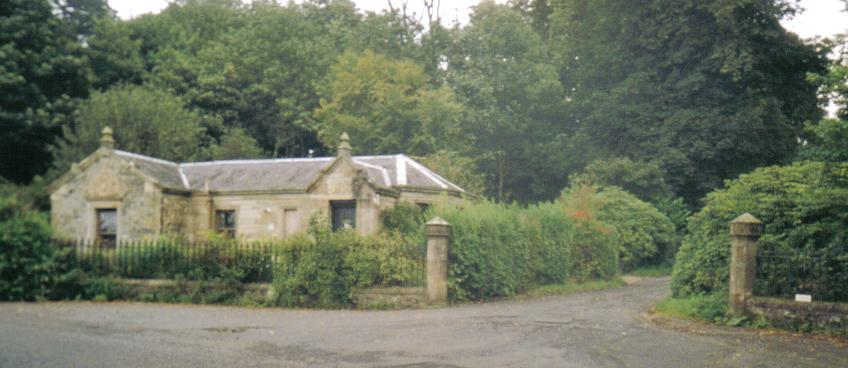
Dunlop House, Dunlop, East Ayrshire with its entrance lodge and gateposts.

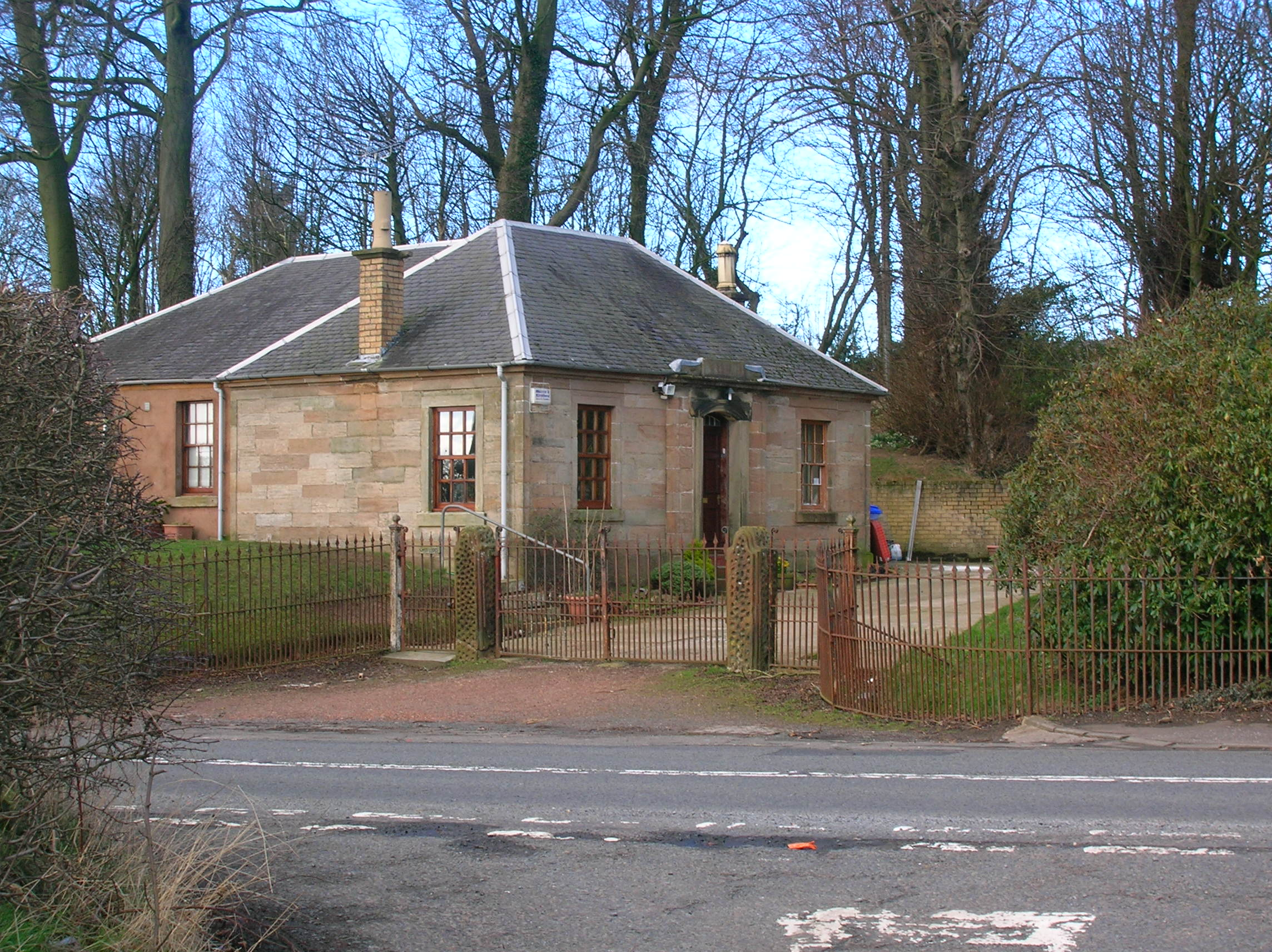
The West Lodge gateposts at Thorntoun, Springside, North Ayrshire.

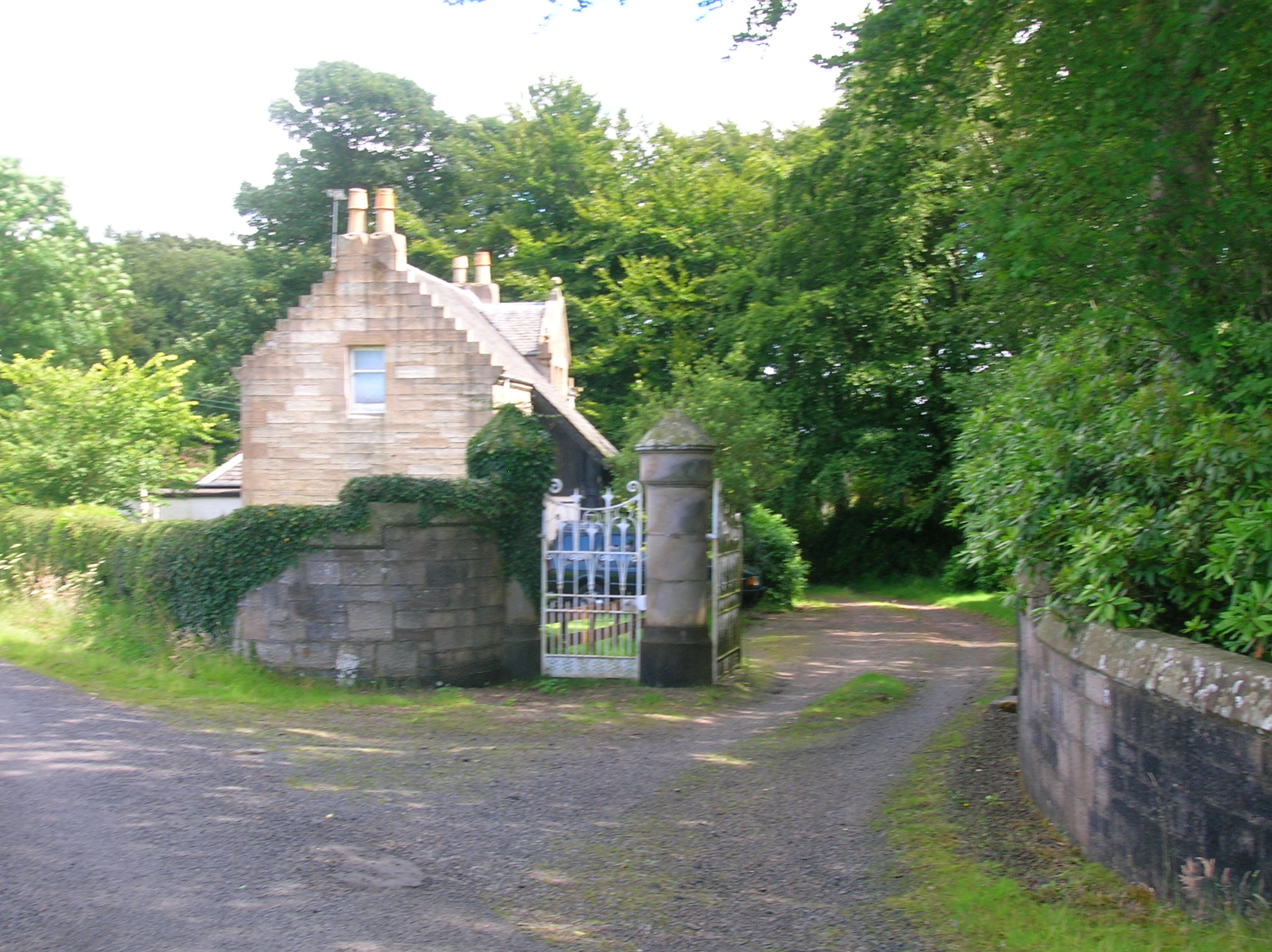
Giffin House gatehouse and gateway, North Ayrshire, 2007

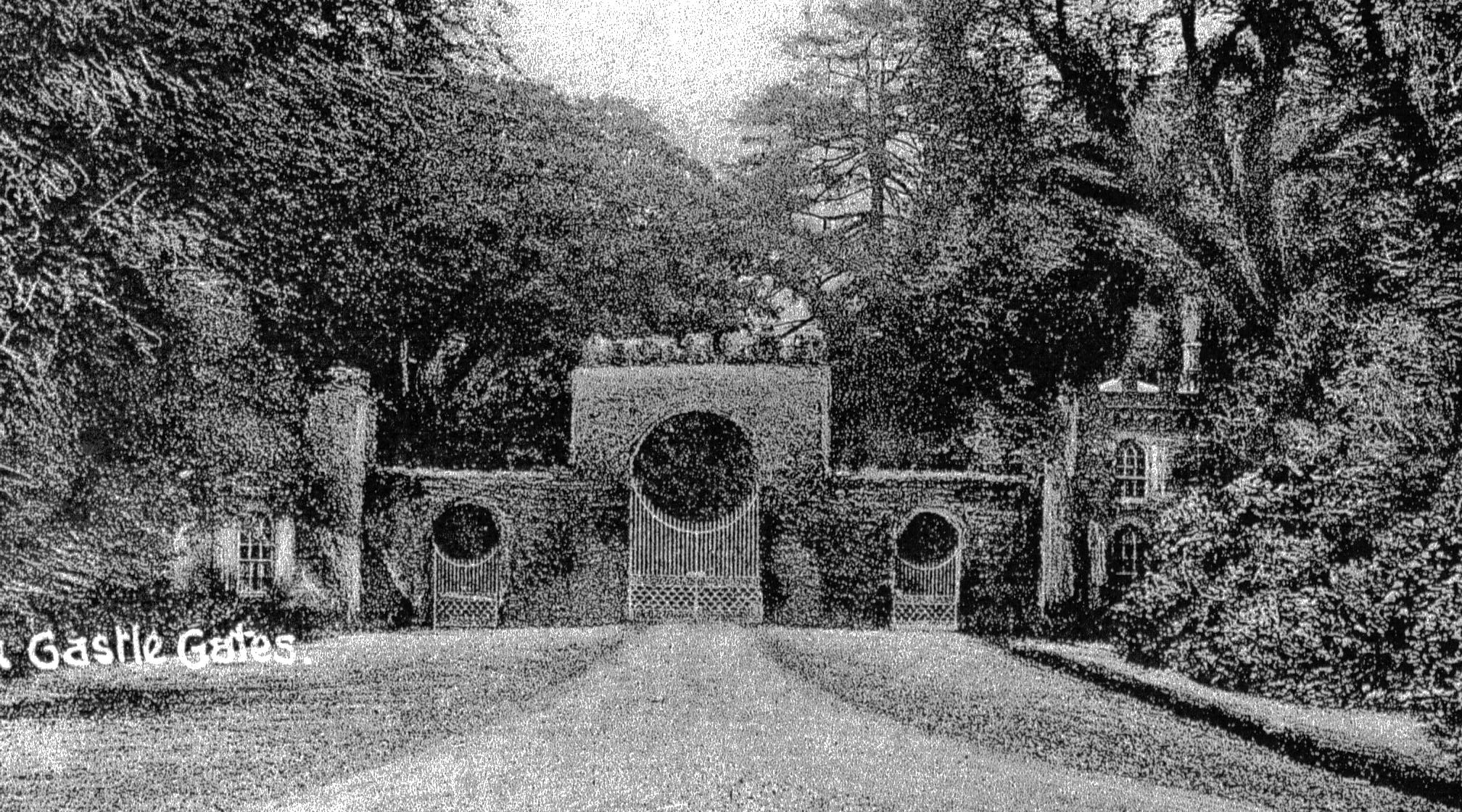
Stanecastle Gate, Eglinton Castle, circa 1840.

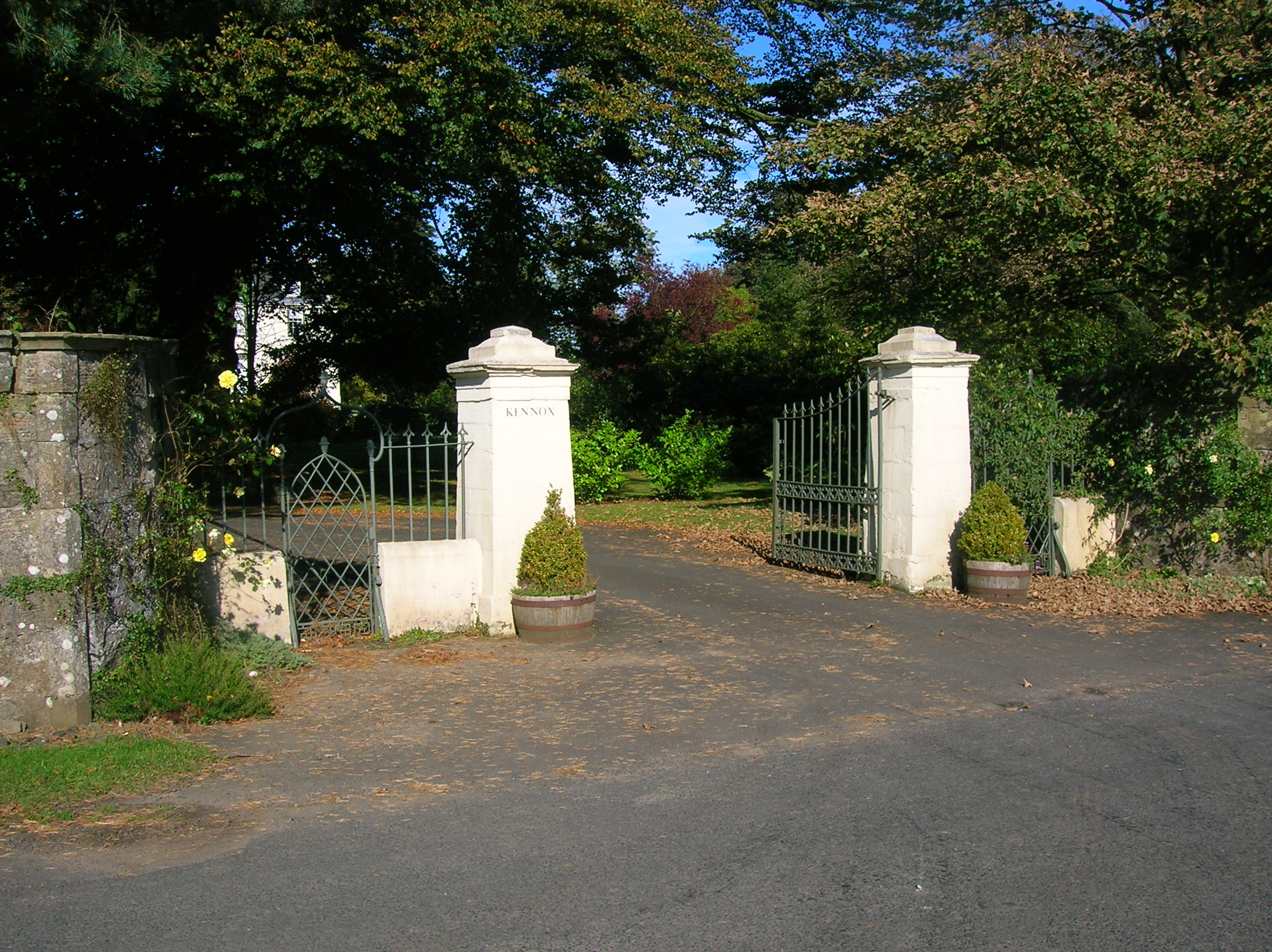
The gates and remains of the old lodges at Kennox House, North Ayrshire in 2007.

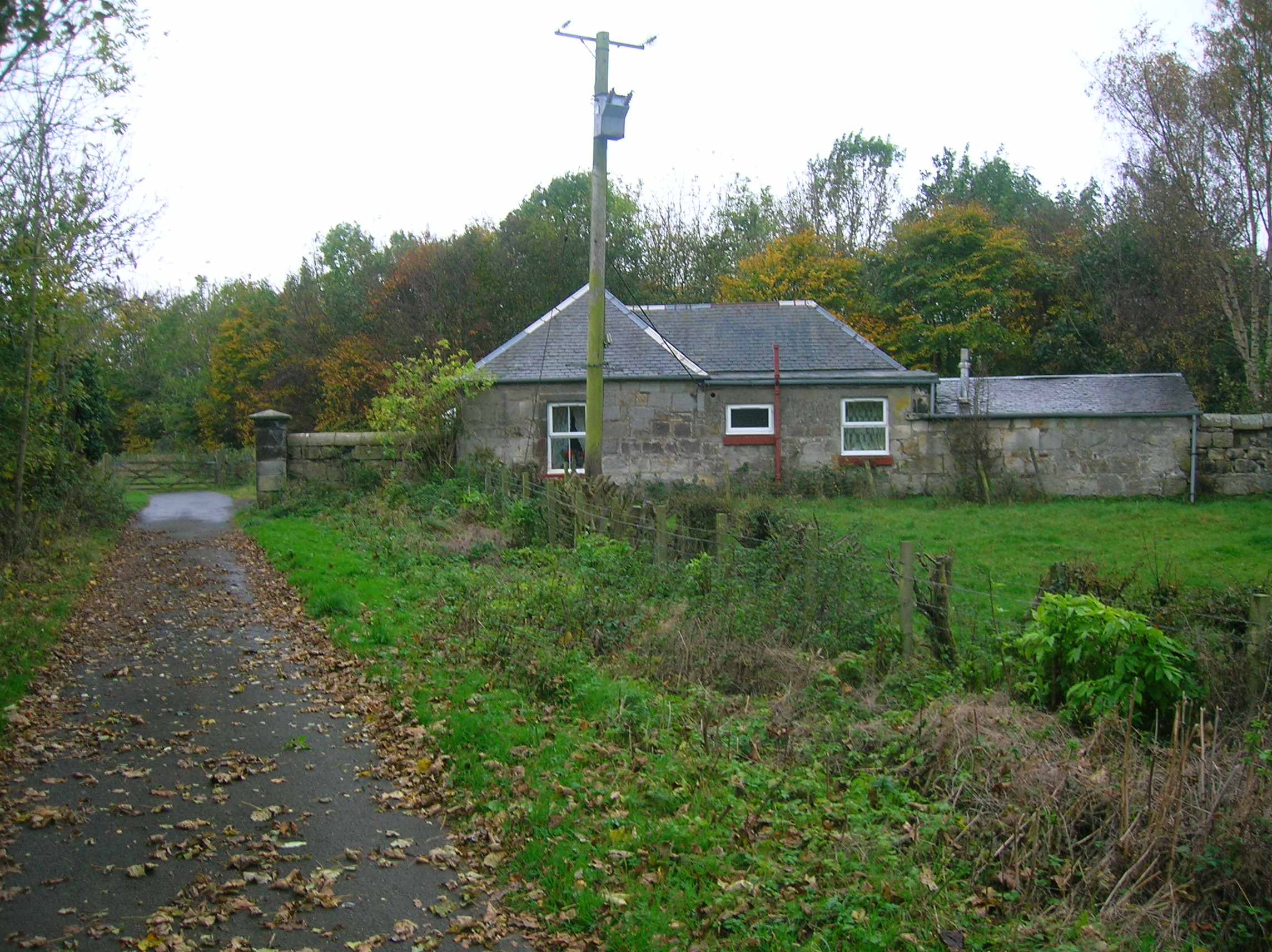
Millburn Lodge and gate; a post 1858 building. Home to one of the Eglinton Castle estate gamekeepers.

==== Eccentric gateposts ====
Sometimes the personality of the builders of gateways are exhibited, for instance in Scotland it is not too unusual to find curling stones crowning a gatepost. Examples of gateposts with highly ornate railings are sometimes found outside new houses where they dominate the dwelling itself.

== See also ==
- Gates
- Gatehouse
- Slip gate
