= Slip gate =

Ancient type of gate

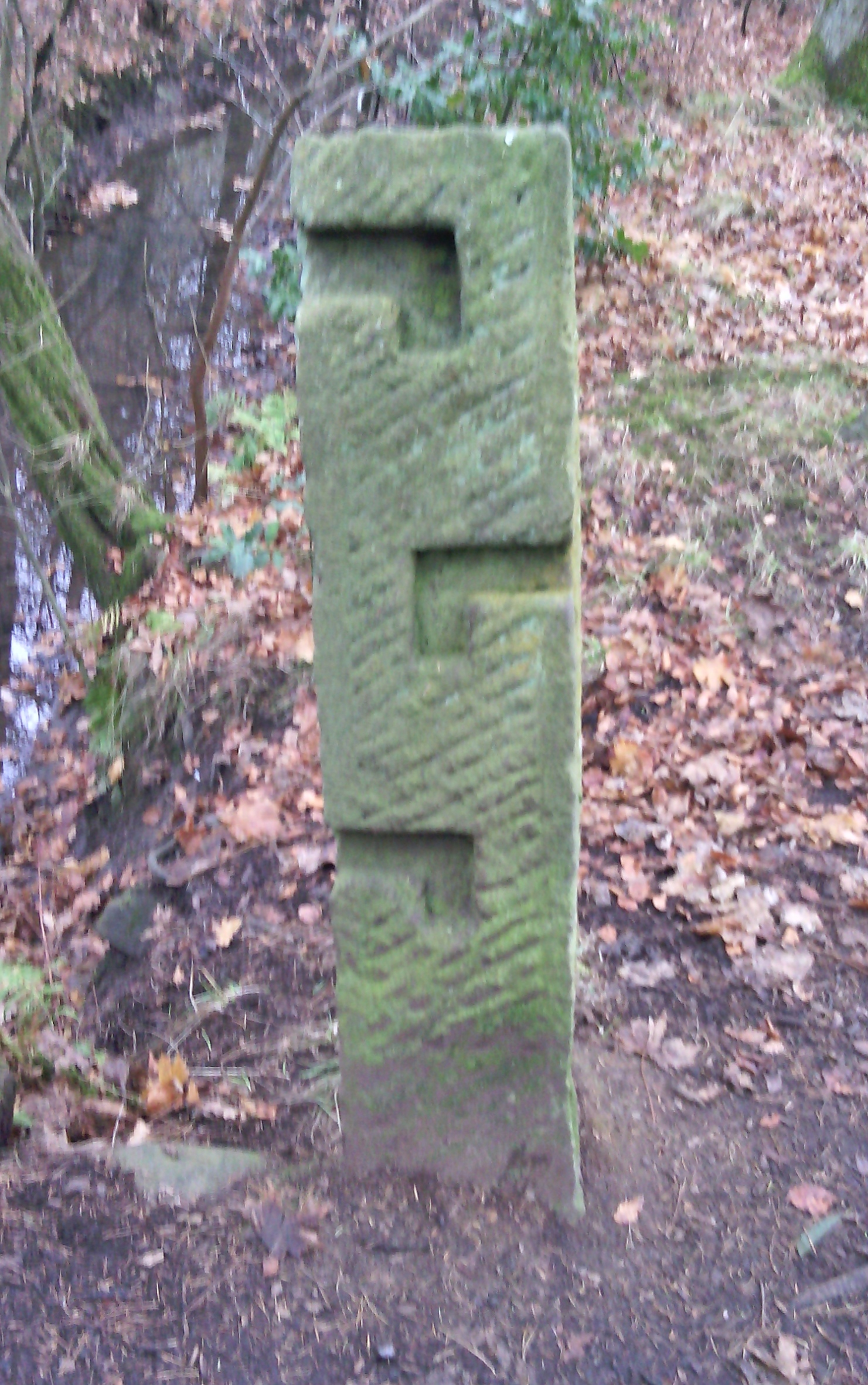
A Slip Gate pier with its rebated grooves at the Greenbank Garden, Glasgow.

Slip Gates, also known as Stang Stoops, Yatsteads or Stang Pole Gateways are a form of simple gate that once commonly in Europe controlled access to fields, lanes, etc. using removable cross-bars and two fixed posts, often of stone. The usually wood spars or stangs were slotted into grooves cut into the stone piers and held firmly in place at one end with wedges and on the other end by being placed in a deep square or circular socket. Most other gates are formed of a fuller frame; many instead have hinges.

== History ==
The 'Slip Gate' etc. is a refinement of the 'Slap' gate that simply used spars that were slotted into hedgerow trees or dry stone dykes without purpose made piers and as these were still in use in the mid 20th century it is difficult to date when 'Slip Gates' were first used, however all field enclosures required gates and therefore they could date back as far as the Iron Age, however many might be only medieval, whilst others could date from the 19th century Enclosure Acts. The name 'Slip Gate' probably derives from the spars being 'slipped' into place.

== Structure and function ==
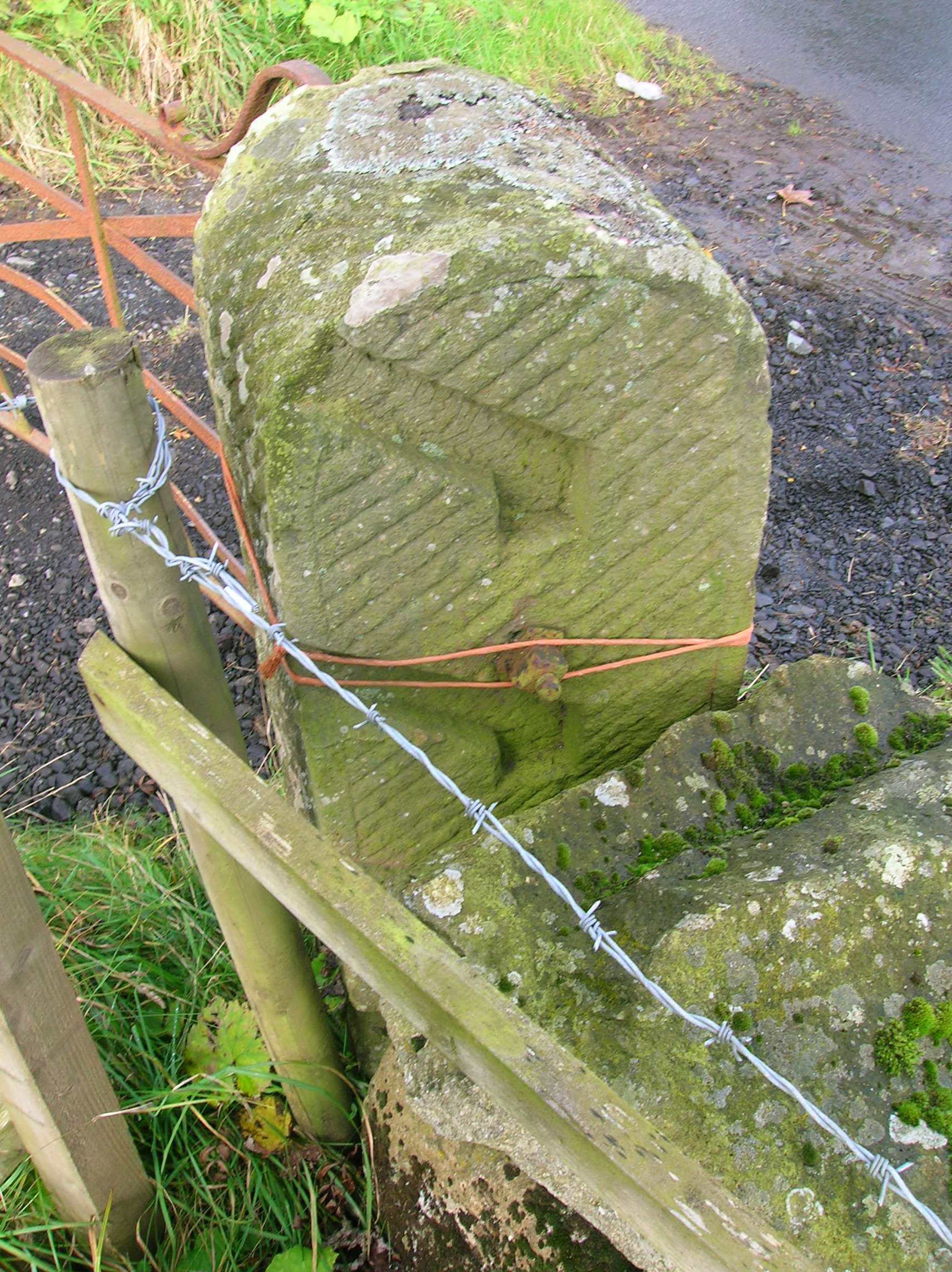
Slip gate pier with unusual groove shapes.

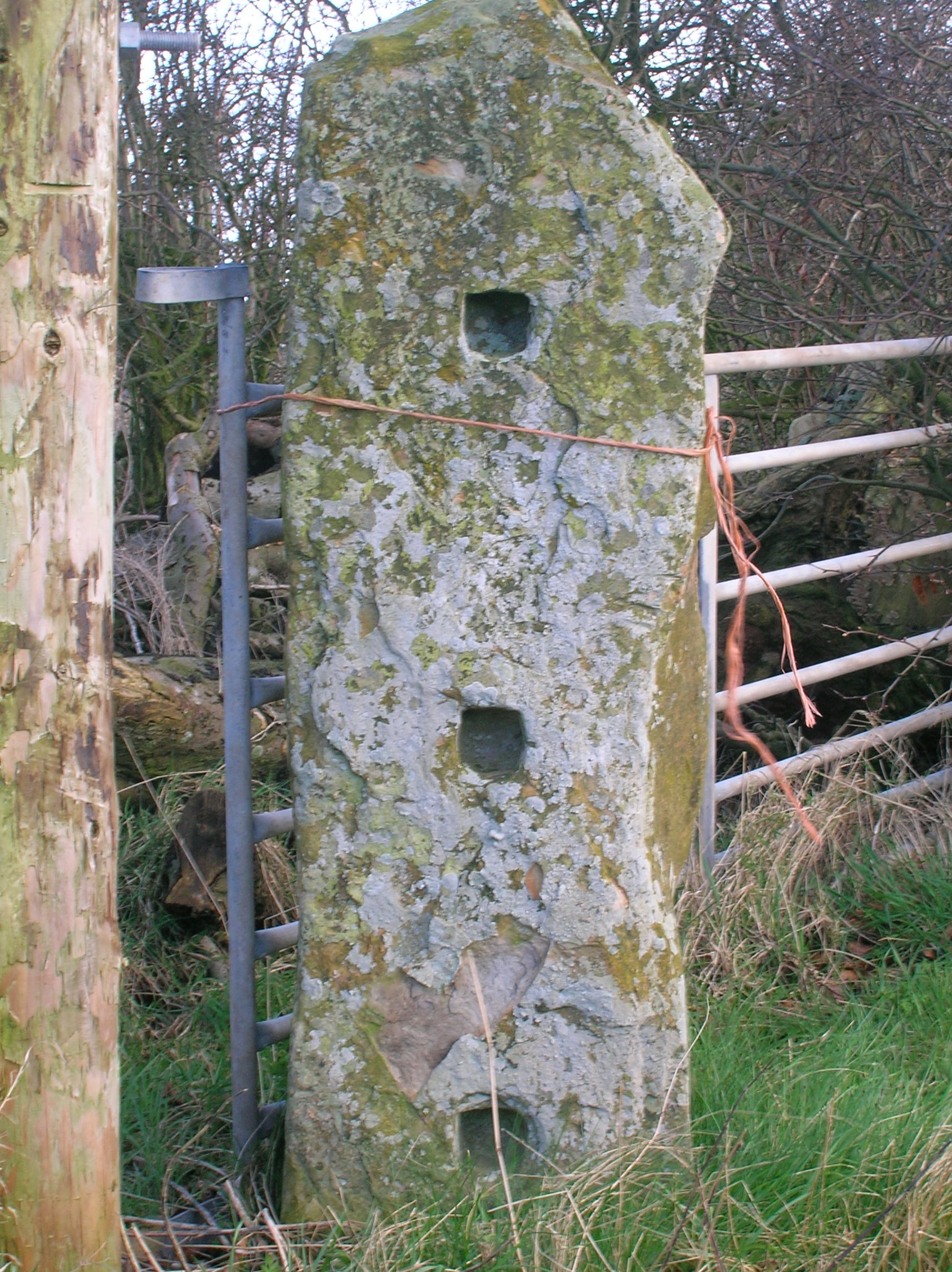
Slip gate pier with notches for gate spars.

Quite apart from the farmers own needs for movement of stock, machines and people between fields and access from roads, lanes etc. it was also a requirement for those using rights of way that gates and stiles whilst being stock proof do not "..present troublesome hindrances to passage." The width of the opening was usually enough to allow a pedestrian, a packhorse or a horse and cart through.

=== Gate piers or stoops ===
The stone used for the piers or stoups ranges from heavy granite, slate or limestone through to lighter more easily worked red sandstone with varying degrees of dressing or finish and decorative embellishment. A typical pier or stoop might be seven foot long in total, sometimes tapering to the top and the grooved side may have a wider face than the sides. The gate pier shape may also be a square sided column.

These piers have to be solidly constructed and set into the ground by at least 2 ft 6in. as well as sometimes being packed with stones.

Slip gate piers at the National Museum of Rural Life's Wester Kittochside Farm were two-sided with L-shaped grooves on one side and square sockets on the other.

=== Grooves ===
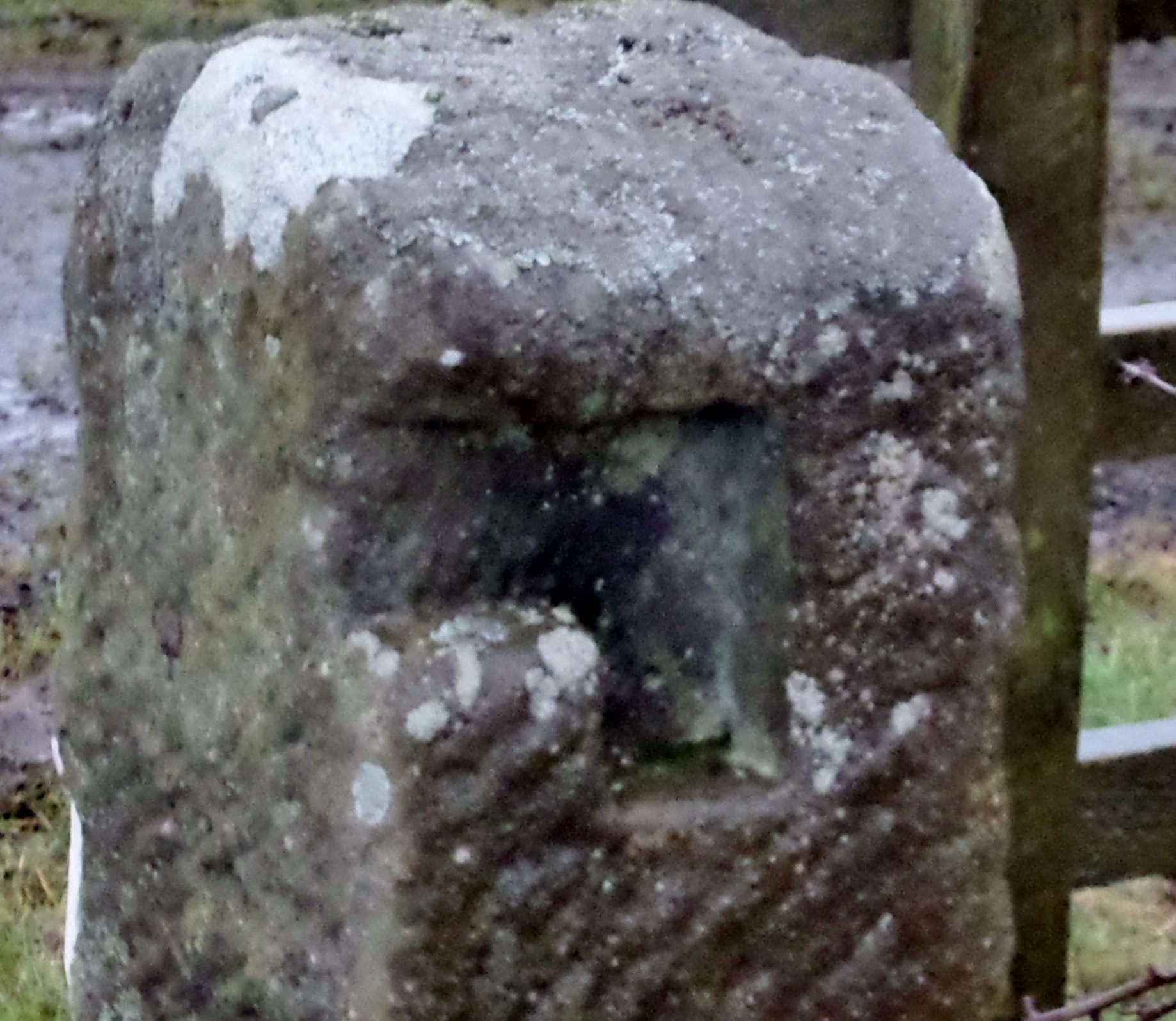
Detail of L-shaped grooves.

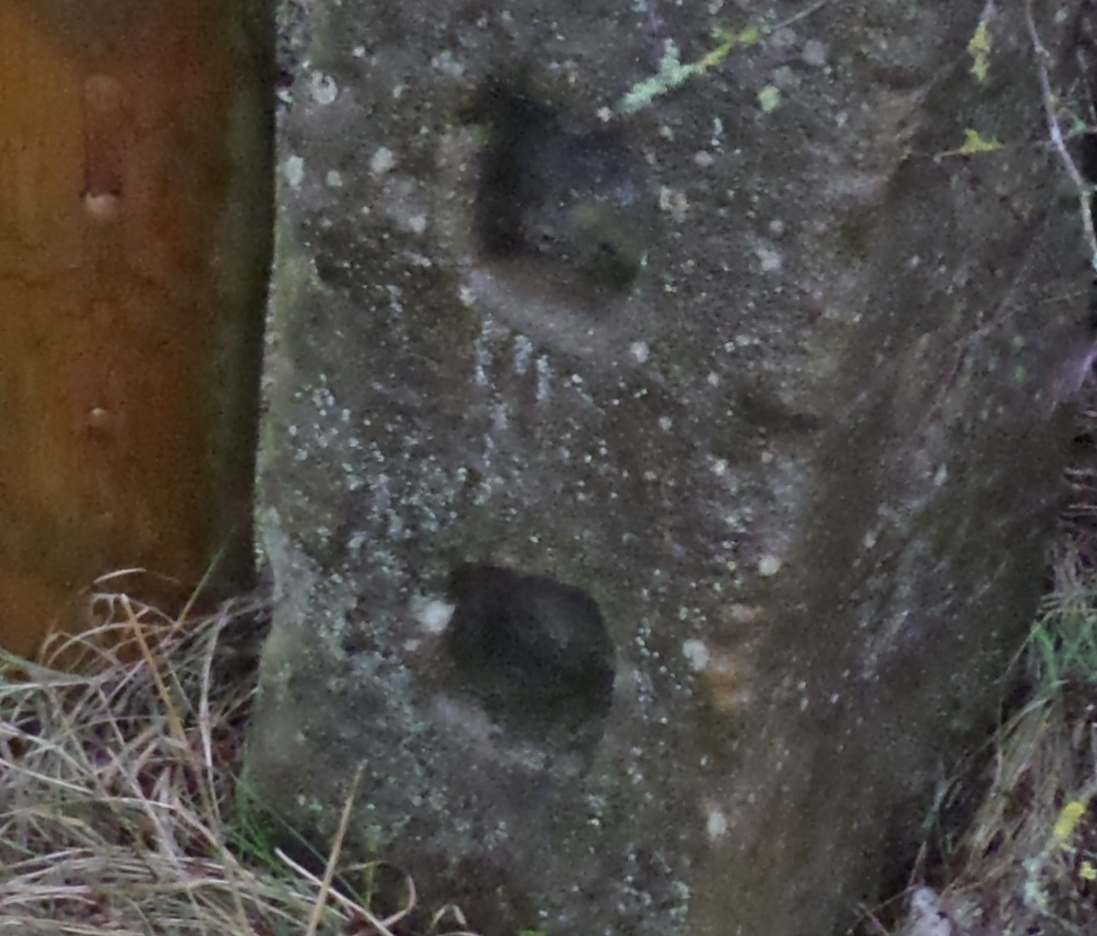
Detail of square sockets.

The rebated grooves where the wedge was inserted were either L-shaped, rarely like a 'Y' with one branch missing or even U-shaped. Usually the grooves faced the same direction although some examples (see photograph) have the centre groove facing the other direction that were used between fields so that the centre spar would resist being dislodged from the other side. The grooves were cut quite deeply to reduce the chance of the spar becoming dislodged. The grooves were sometimes neatly cut with the skill of a stonemason or rather roughly formed by farm workers, etc.

The L-shaped groove entrances would face the field so that the stock could not push the spars out of the slots. A second type of rebated slot was sometimes used and this was U-shaped, with the depth of the rebate getting gradually deeper with one of the gate piers leaning backwards to create a ‘wedge’ shape that allowed the poles to sit securely.

=== Spars ===
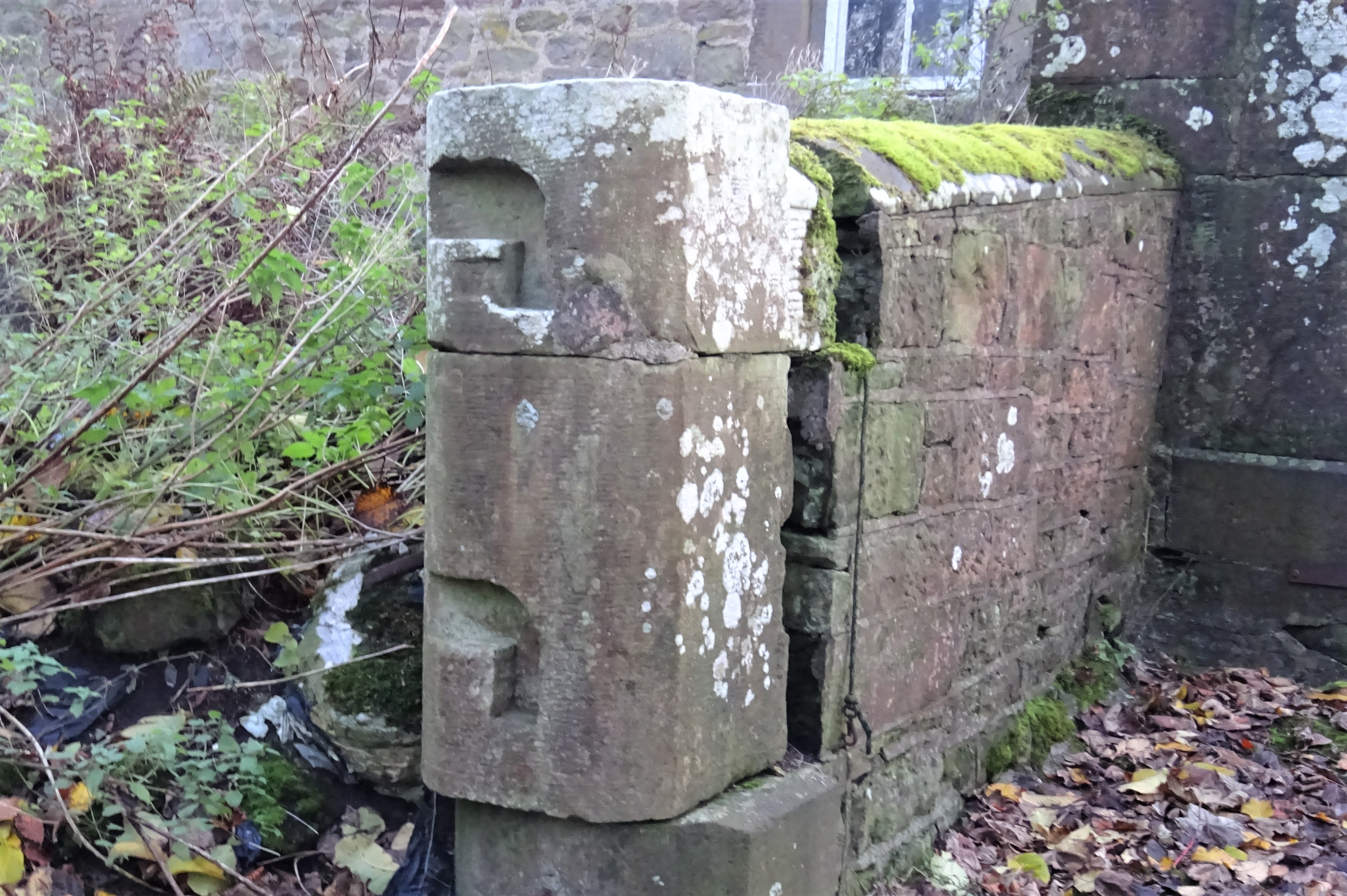
Hinge and 'L' groove gate, Hoddom Mains.

The spars, bars or stangs were usually made of wood and were first inserted into the socket before being slipped into the groove and then held firmly in place by a wedge.

One advantage of slip gates was that a couple of the lower spars could be removed to permit the free movement of sheep whilst still restricting the passage of larger stock such as cattle.

=== Variants ===
In Cumberland at Borrowdale a variant on the more common design is found made from slate with five or holes in each gate pier through which the wood spars were placed. Some examples had a circular hole in one pier and a square hole in the other so that the spars could not rotate and work loose. An example at Hoddom Mains Farm in Dumfriesshire had a hinge on one side and L-shaped grove for horizontal extensions of the gate.

=== Abandonment ===
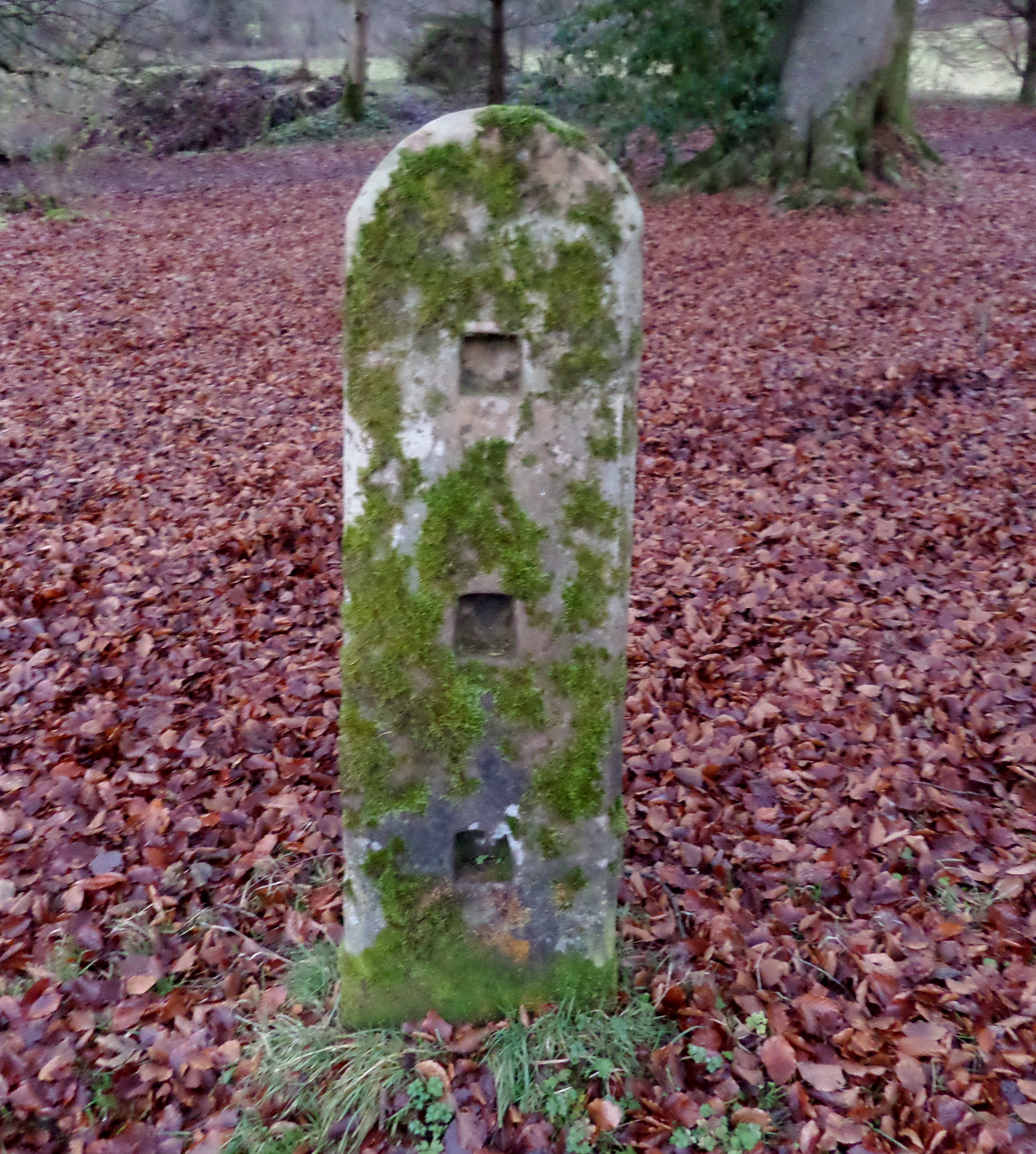
Gate pier with square notches.

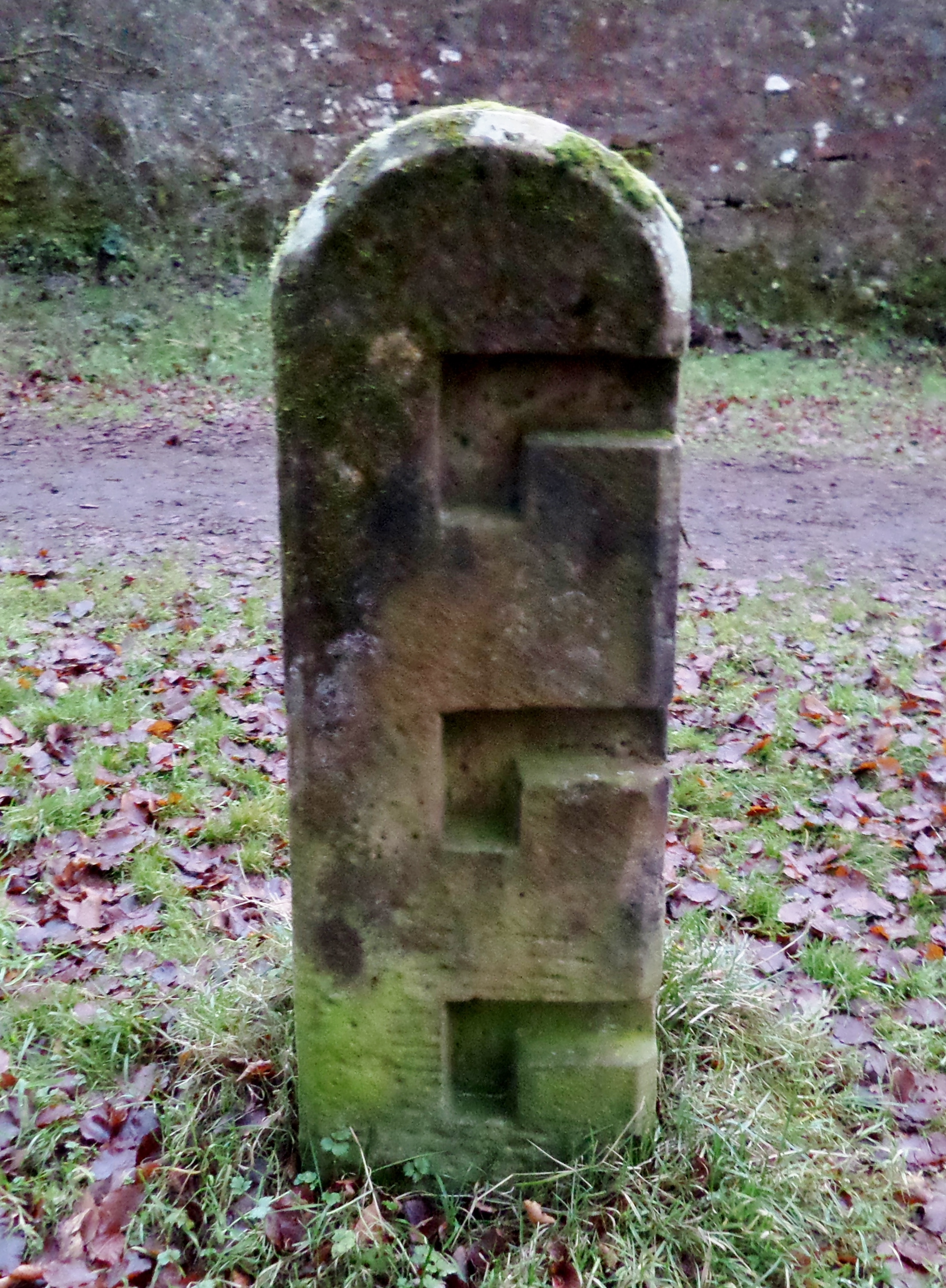
Gate pier with L-shaped rebated slots.

The drawback with 'Slip Gates' was the wear and tear at the ends of the wood spars leading to failure of one or more when placed under stress, a problem not encountered with hinged frame-style gates. Some slip gate piers were adapted for use as standard field gates with holes cut through for a pair of hinges and a latch.

== Slaps ==
These were the forerunner of both hinged gates and 'Slip Gates' and were merely wood spars or branches placed across a gap in a hedge or dyke with the spars held in place by the hedge or by the stones. Great care was required when replacing the spars to ensure that they were stock proof. especially as in times past footfall in the countryside was much greater with many more farm workers and also locals foraging for foods such as mushrooms, watercress, brambles, etc. 'Slaps' were still in use up until the mid 20th century.

They are mentioned by Robert Burns in his poem "Tam o Shanter":

We think na on the lang Scots miles,
The mosses, waters, slaps, and styles,
That lie between us and our hame,

== See also ==
- Hampshire gate
- Kissing gate
- Lychgate
