= Cattle grid =

Ground object that impedes animals but allows humans and vehicles to pass

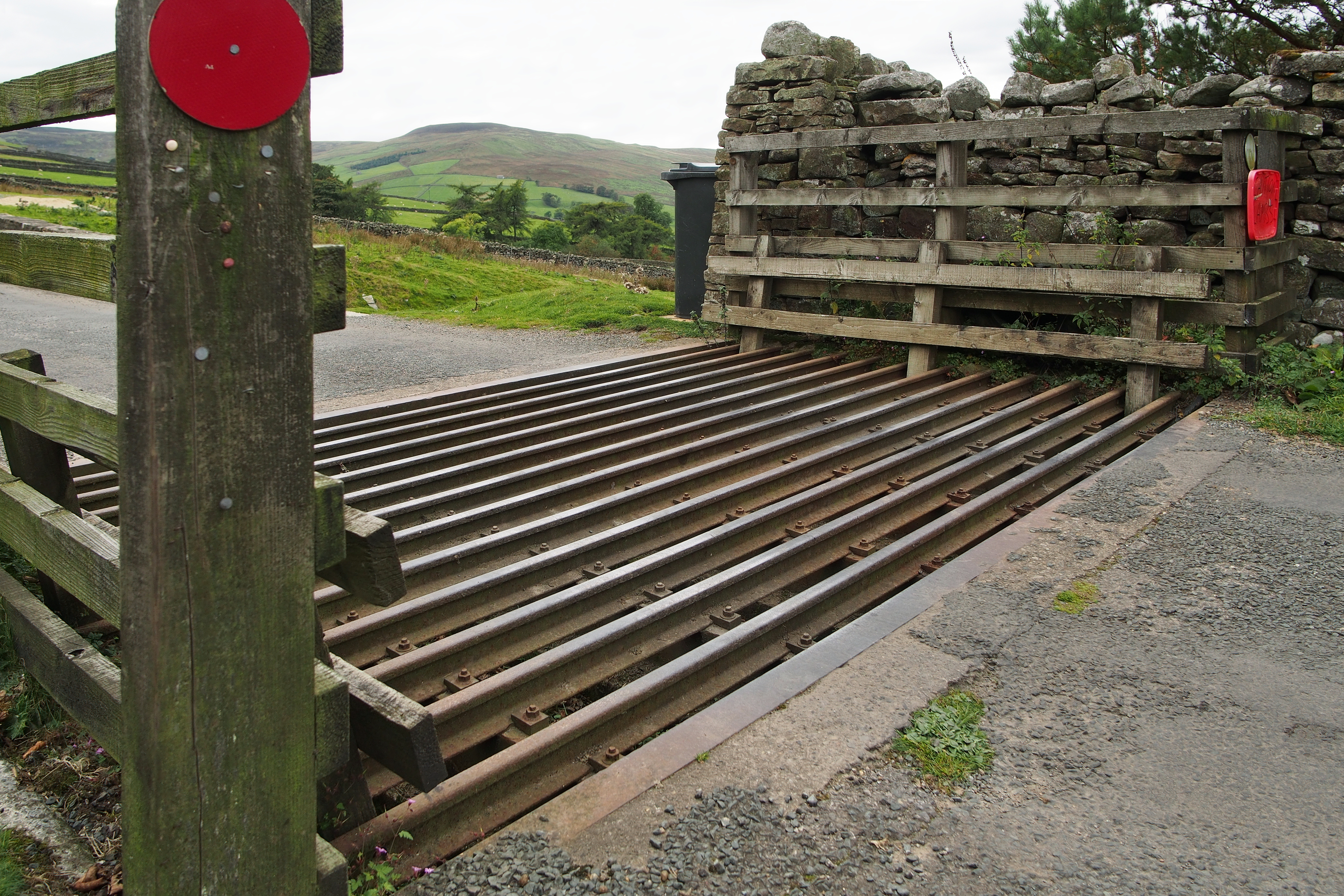
A cattle grid on a country road in the Yorkshire Dales

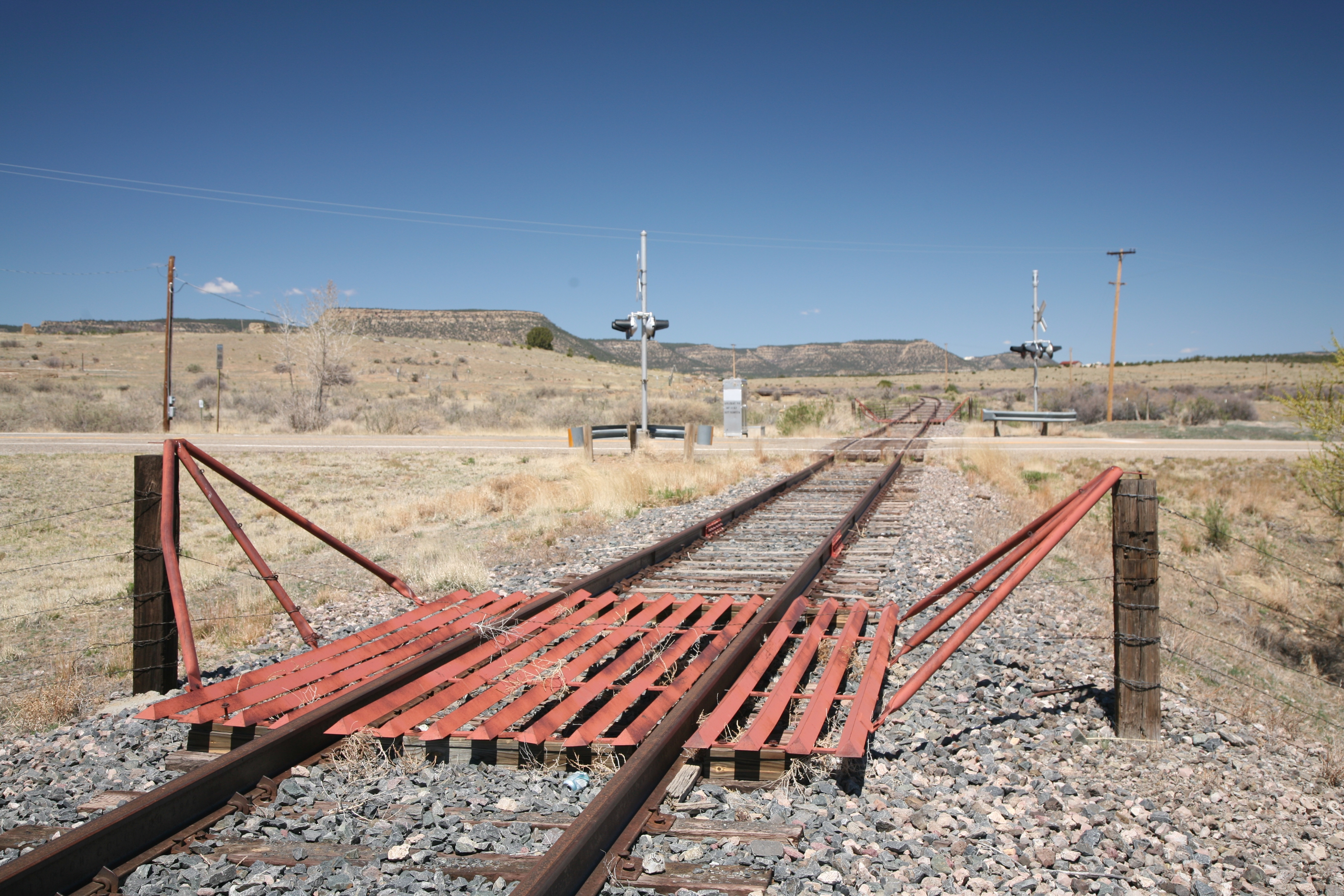
Cattle grid on a railway line in northeastern New Mexico

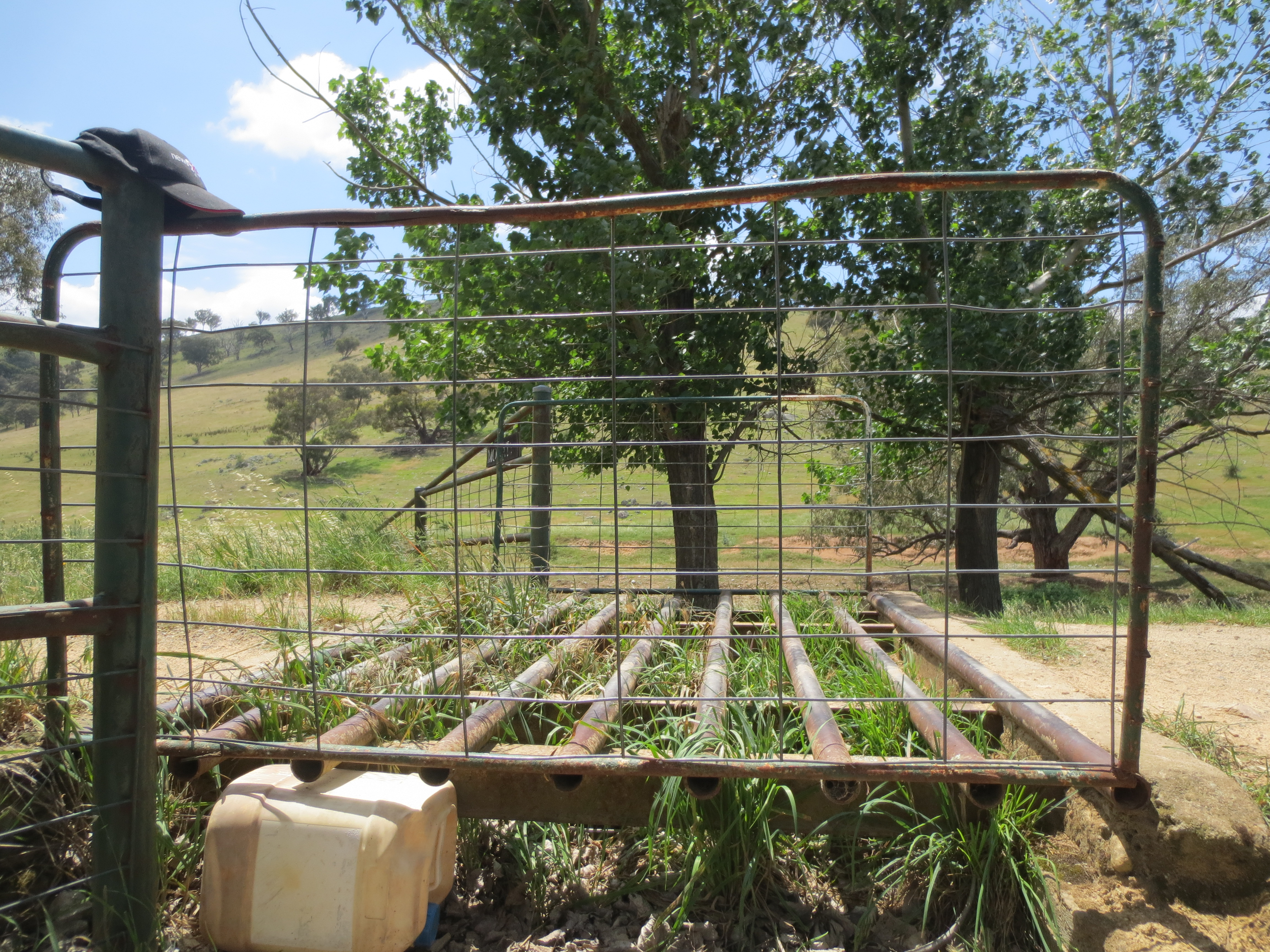
Cattle grid in Galong, Australia

A cattle grid – also known as a stock grid in Australia; cattle guard, or cattle grate in American English; vehicle pass, or stock gap in the Southeastern United States; Texas gate in western Canada and the northwestern United States; and a cattle stop in New Zealand English – is a type of obstacle used to prevent livestock, such as sheep, cattle, pigs, horses, or mules from passing along a road or railway which penetrates the fencing surrounding an enclosed piece of land or border. It consists of a depression in the road covered by a transverse grid of bars or tubes, normally made of metal and firmly fixed to the ground on either side of the depression, so that the gaps between them are wide enough for an animal's feet to enter, but sufficiently narrow not to impede a wheeled vehicle or human foot. This provides an effective barrier to animals without impeding wheeled vehicles, as the animals are reluctant to walk on the grates.

== Origins ==
The modern cattle grid for roads used by automobiles is said to have been independently invented a number of times on the Great Plains of the United States around 1905–1915. Before that period, a similar device for railroads was in use at least as early as 1836; a stone stile was used in Britain as far back as pre-Roman times. An article in Texas Monthly claims that the "first recorded use of a cattle grid for nonrail traffic" occurred in 1881 in Archer County, Texas, on the stagecoach road between Archer City and Henrietta.

== Uses ==
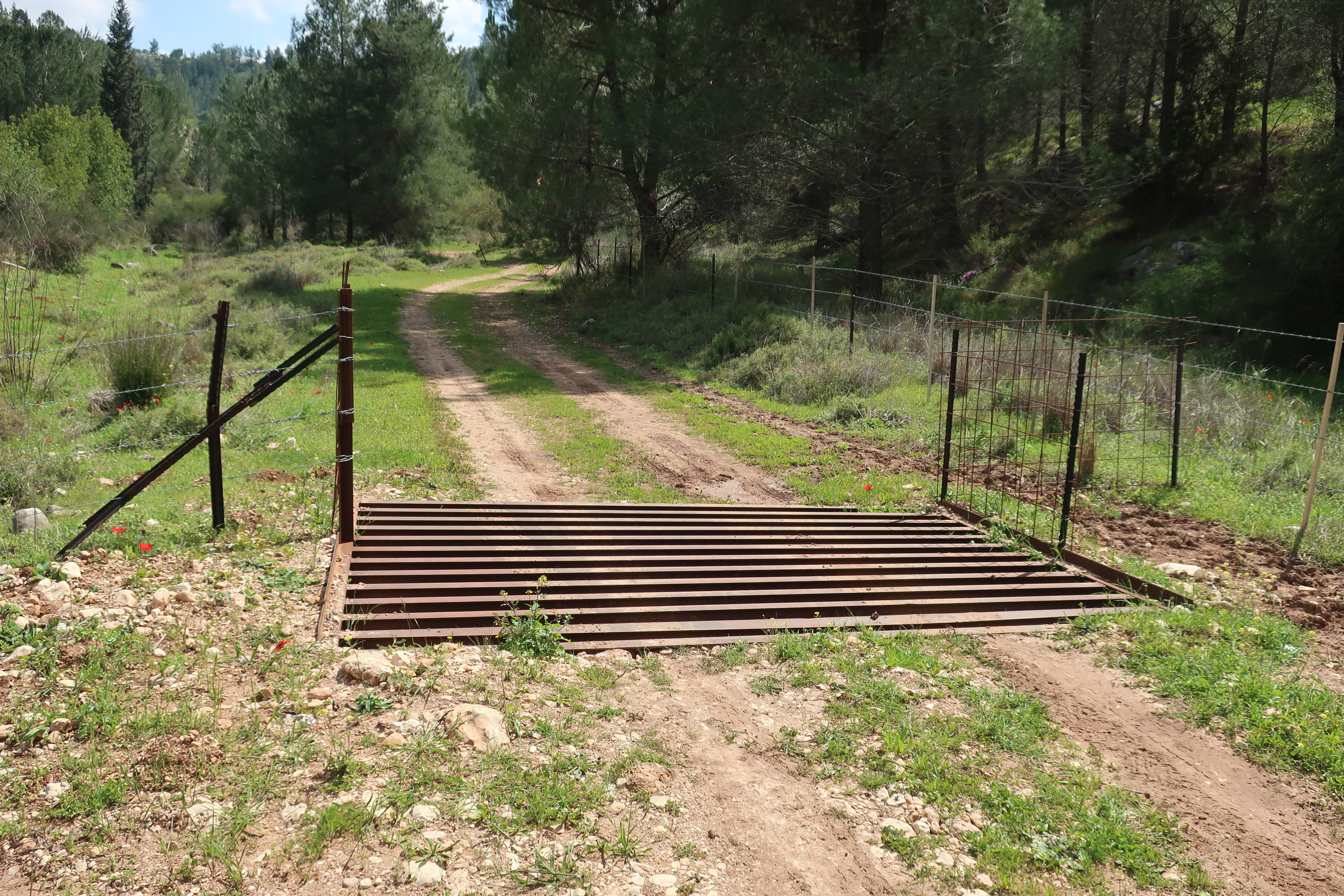
Cattle grid on country road

Cattle grids are usually installed on roads where they cross a fenceline, often at a boundary between public and private lands. They are an alternative to the erection of gates that would need to be opened and closed when a vehicle passes, and are common where roads cross open moorland, rangeland or common land maintained by grazing, but where segregation of fields is impractical. Cattle grids are also used when otherwise unfenced railways cross a fenceline. Cattle grids are common worldwide and are widespread in places such as Australia, the Scottish Highlands, or the National Parks of England and Wales. They are also common throughout the Western United States and Canada. In the United States, they are often used on Bureau of Land Management and Forest Service land, but are also used on paved roads and entry and exit ramps of the Interstate Highway System in rural areas. In Lapland, cattle grids are also used to prevent free-range reindeer from entering fenced areas such as road areas or lumber yards or crossing international borders.

== Variations ==
Almost all cattle grids are built around a grid. Most include a pit dug along a fence line, a base for the grid to rest on, and wings to connect the guard to the fence. Since many guards were or are home-made and to some degree idiosyncratic, a wide variety of designs exist. Designs may vary with local conditions. Materials used for construction of a cattle grid depend partly on the weight it must bear.

A study of the bars of traditional cattle grids in the Flint Hills of Kansas found that 80 percent were made of pipe, while smaller percentages were made of railroad rails, I-beams, planks, and other materials. The size of the bars varied from 38 to 165 millimetres (1 1/2 to 6 1/2 in); the spaces between bars varied from 44 to 203 millimetres (1 3/4 to 8 in); the number of bars per grid varied from 4 to 22. Grids differed in length from 2.4 to 9.1 metres (7 3/4 to 30 ft) and in width from 1.0 to 3.0 metres (40 to 120 in), while the pits beneath grids were 0.0 to 2.5 metres (0 to 98 in) deep.

Cattle grids, as they are called in Great Britain, Ireland, and South Africa, are known by a wide variety of other names in other parts of the world. In the United States, they are cattle guards. Mata burro ('donkey killer') is the preferred name in Brazil and Venezuela, while guarda ganado ('cattle keeper') is what they are called in Argentina. Alternatives in the United States include car crossing, auto gate, corduroy gate, stock gap, cattle pass, run-over, and many others. Canadians use pit gate, vehicle pass, and Texas gate, as well as cattle guard, which in Canada refers mainly to guards at railway lines.

=== Concrete ===
Cattle grids made entirely or mostly of concrete have existed since the 1940s. Individual ranchers have often constructed their own, sometimes using plans developed in the 1940s. In the 21st century, a set of plans for do-it-yourself guards made of wood and concrete are available via the web site of the Missouri Alternatives Center at the University of Missouri in the US. Commercial precast concrete versions are also available; Smith Cattleguard Company, based in Virginia, sold more than 15,000 of them between 1960 and 1980. Manufacturers also produce commercial polyethylene forms with reinforcing rods. Placed in or on the ground and filled, a finished cattle grid with 4,000-pound-per-square-inch (28 MPa) concrete reinforced with 5/8-inch (16 mm) fiberglass (GFRP) rebar can support vehicle loads of up to 32,000 pounds (15 t) per axle.

=== Steel ===
University Lands, which manages land and mineral interests for a foundation supporting the University of Texas and Texas A&M University systems, publishes do-it-yourself manuals for three sizes of cattle grids with grids made of steel pipes. The manuals include schematic drawings as well as accompanying instructions. Commercial guards made of steel are also available from multiple companies.

=== Virtual ===
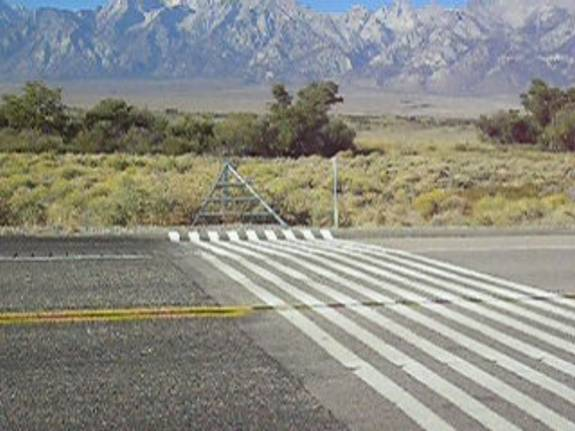
A "virtual grid" near Lone Pine, California

Painted lines on the road can serve as skeuomorphs of cattle grids. The light-dark pattern of lines on pavement resembles a true cattle grid to animals, and by association think they will not be able to cross. Using a virtual cattle grid is initially cheaper than a true cattle grid, but the cost of periodic re-painting may eventually exceed the initial cost of a well-built metal guard. A particular advantage of painted guards is that they are smooth to drive over; in the US, most are found on state or federal highways, rather than private roads.

Why they work is unclear, but it is most likely related to the bovine visual system. Experts say that "a cow's depth perception is such that it makes little or no distinction between painted stripes on a dark background and bars over a pit." Cattle may acquire the behavior of avoiding grids over pits either from individual experience or through imitation of other cattle. However, painted grids have been reported to work with semi-wild cattle with no prior exposure to virtual grids.

Cattle can sometimes defeat virtual guards. A station owner in Queensland, Australia, told a reporter that after some of his old bulls leaped a painted grid, the younger ones lost their fear of walking across. This is common; if one member of a herd discovers it can step safely on the lines, others will follow. Other incentives that lead cattle to test a virtual guard include placing food on the opposite side, or using strong driving pressure to run panicked cattle over a virtual grid.

=== Electric ===
Electric cattle grids use electricity to deter animals from crossing the fence line. There are different designs. One uses high-tensile wire run across the roadway, about 3 to 4 inches (8 to 10 cm) off the ground, attached to a power source on one side. The primary advantage is cost and ease of installation. Drawbacks include the necessity of spraying vegetation with herbicides to keep weeds from shorting out the grid if there is no barrier between the wires and the ground. In addition, some low-riding vehicles can catch the wires and tear them out.

James Hoy in The Cattle Guard discusses four kinds of electric guards. One that was patented in Illinois in 1955 and another invented in New Zealand in 1979 are similar; each resemble "something like the framework of an old-fashioned metal bed" connected to a battery or high-powered fence charger. They are easy to drive across, but may pose a danger to children or animals that get stuck in the guard. Another type was patented in two versions by an Oregon inventor in 1956–57; it consisted of 20 current-carrying synthetic rubber strips mounted on a wooden frame. The invention proved highly effective in deterring all animals, including dogs, and it was maintenance free, easy to drive over, and safe. However, the company that acquired the manufacturing rights stopped production in 1960. A fourth type, homemade, consists of two sections of woven wire or steel plate laid on a concrete slab and set apart from one another on either side of a fenceline. The wire sections are then connected to an electric fence or to a separate charger, either conventional or solar-powered.

== Effectiveness on wildlife ==
A cow successfully crossing a cattle grid

While cattle grids are most effective on cattle, they can be used to exclude deer and elk. Research has shown that deer can cross cattle grids with flat, as opposed to rounded bars. Sometimes a cattle grid is doubled to exclude these animals. A cattle grid requiring a horizontal leap of 14 feet (4.3 m) is considered effective when combined with a deer fence. Striping is also painted on roads as a visual deterrent to deer, as with "virtual" cattle grids.

== Limitations and risks ==
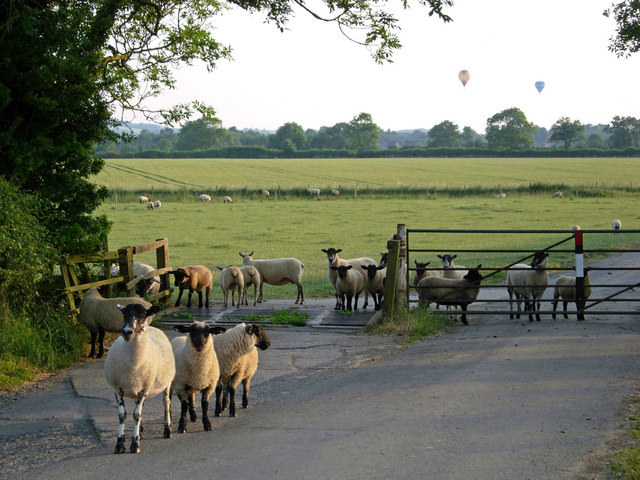
A cattle grid and straying sheep

While these barriers are usually effective for cattle, they can fail due to ingenious animals. Sheep searching for food have been known to jump across grids, step carefully into the spaces, or run along the side of grids as wide as 8 feet (2.4 m).

Wider grids are used where wildlife is to be contained. Some animals can jump across them, and a barrier that stops deer needs to be at least 16 feet (5 m) wide. Bison, and bulls in particular can easily jump across an 8-foot (2.4 m) barrier, and have been known to jump widths of up to 14 feet (4.3 m).

In areas with heavy snowfall and long periods without a thaw, snow can accumulate beneath a grid and allow animals to walk across.

Horses are particularly vulnerable to cattle grid injuries, as their single-toed hooves can slip between the bars and trap their legs in an easily broken position. The same risk exists for kangaroos in Australia's outback, with additional risk of entrapment.

Cattle grids are generally useless for containing goats. However, a Texas Highway Department official reported that adding three 20-inch (51 cm) painted stripes—arranged yellow, white, yellow—on the road in front of a cattle grid deterred goats from approaching or crossing the guard.

Cattle grids produce noise when vehicles pass over them and people living in a 100 m radius from the grid can be affected.

== Patents and standards ==
The United States Patent and Trademark Office (US PTO) issued patent U.S. patent 1125095A on January 15, 1915, to William J. Hickey, Reno, Nevada, for a cattle grid. The patent expired in 1932.

There is a British Standard for cattle grids: BS4008:2006. The US standards are put forth by The American Association of State Highway and Transportation Officials (AASHTO). AASHTO provides load rating guidelines for cattle grids that are used on public roads in the US. All cattle grids used on US public roads must be certified by a qualified engineer that the grid meets AASHTO guidelines.

== See also ==
- Anti-trespass panels, rubber and wooden surfaces meant to deter walking on or near rail tracks, derived from cattle grids
- Bump gate
- Bus trap
- Ha-ha
