= Rambler gate =

Self-closing gate

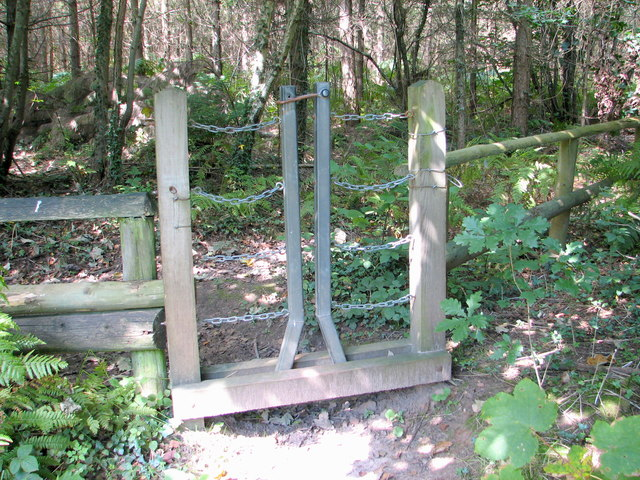
A rambler gate in Gloucestershire

A rambler gate is a self-closing footpath barrier that is in common use in some parts of Britain. It is designed to allow pedestrians to pass but to provide an effective barrier to livestock. It resembles a squeeze stile but the gap can be expanded by pushing a pair of pivot posts apart. The pivot posts will close under their own weight, and are often strung with chains that fill in the gaps. There may be a simple latch to hold the two pivot posts together.

A rambler gate is relatively easy to use and it is possible, but awkward, to get a bicycle through. Although it may be easier to negotiate than a stile, pushing the pivot posts aside does require some strength and, as they close, they can catch the unwary. The design is compact and easy to install. It is important to keep the mechanism free of debris.

The gates keep out livestock, horses, motorcycles and vehicles. They are also a barrier to baby buggies, wheelchairs and mobility vehicles.

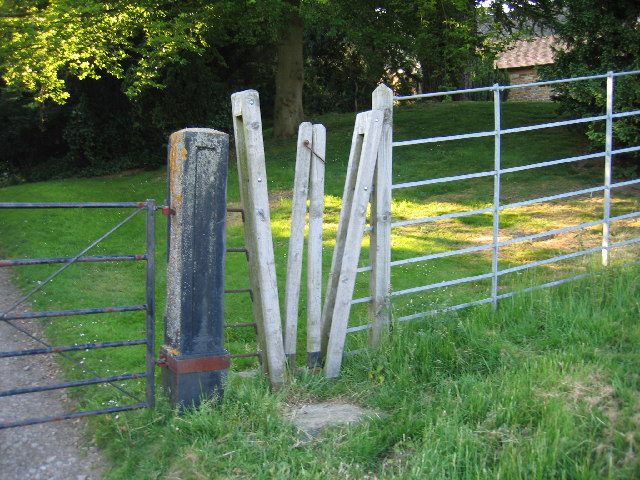
A similar design in wood

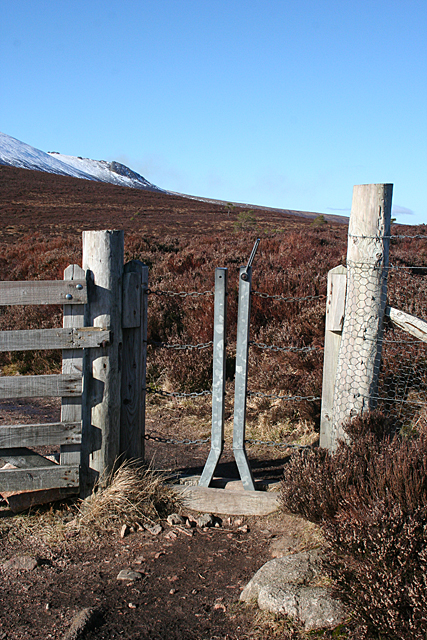
A rambler gate in Scotland

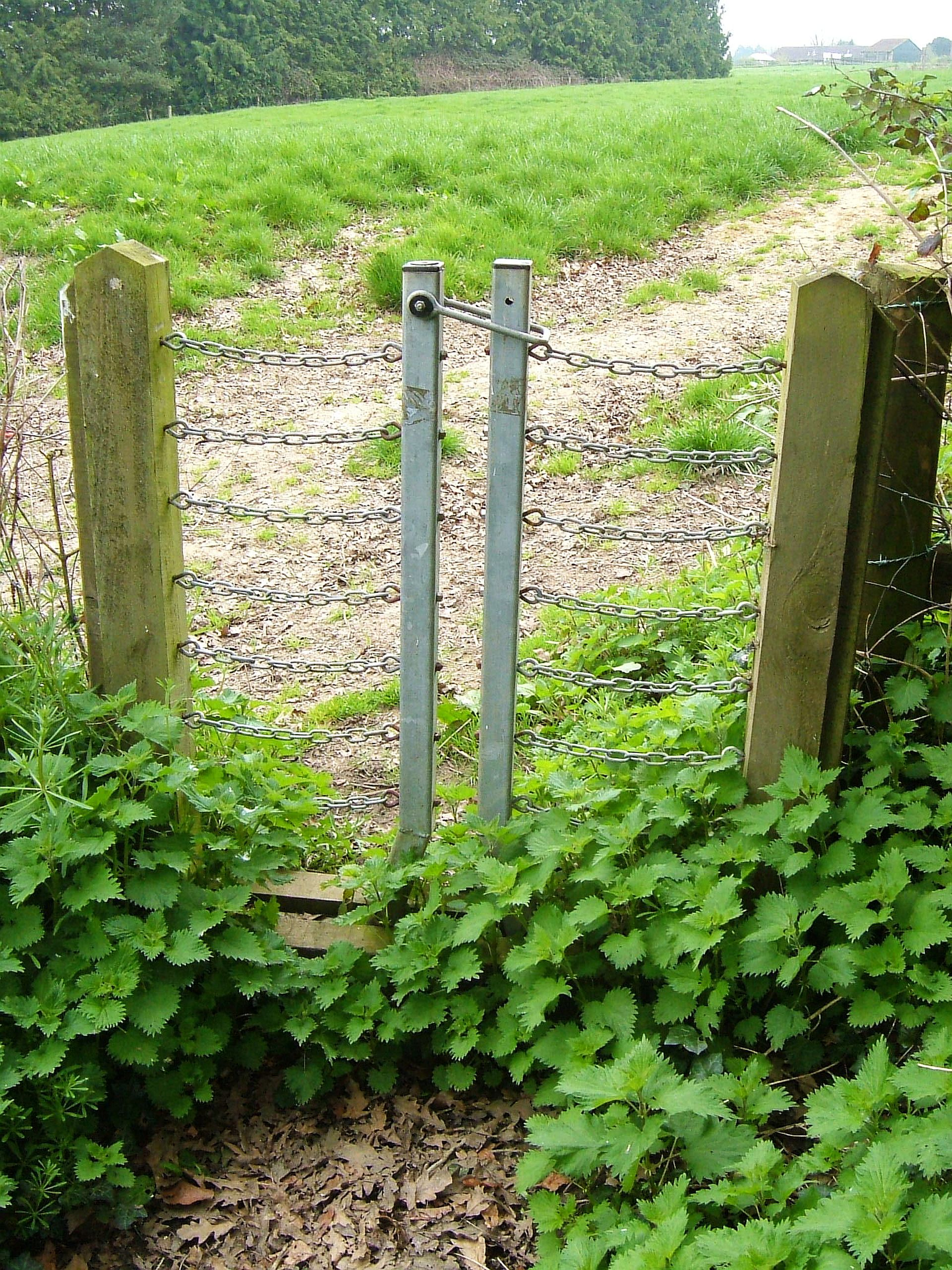
A rambler gate near Kingstone, Somerset

== See also ==
- Stile
- Kissing gate
- Mass path
