= Bump gate =

Type of barrier

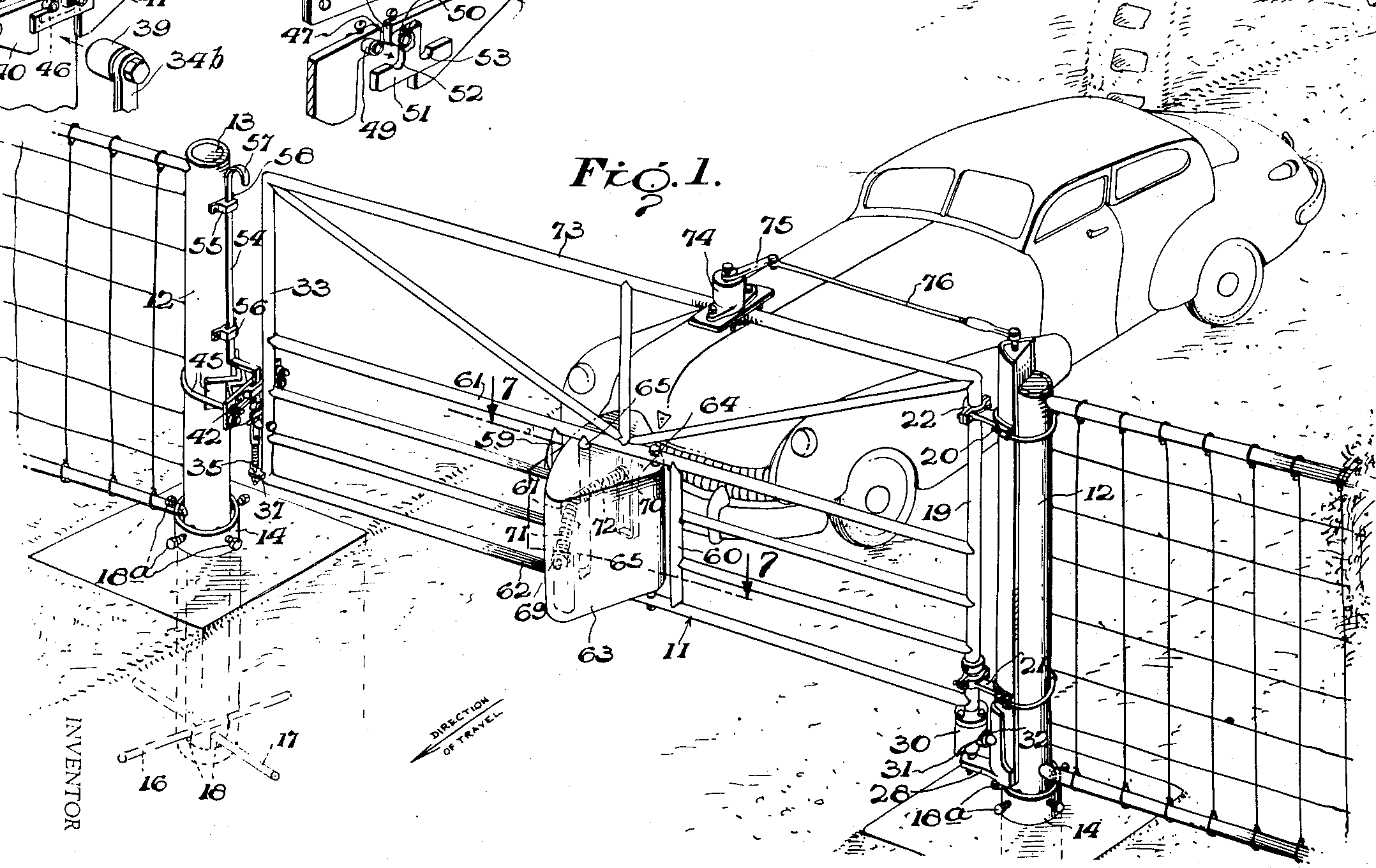
Drawing of a center-post bump gate, taken from US Patent US 2693653, published Nov. 9, 1954.

A bump gate is a drive-through gate used in rural areas to provide a barrier to livestock but does not require the driver to exit the vehicle.

By gently contacting the swinging bump gate with the front of a vehicle and then accelerating, the gate is pushed open, allowing the vehicle to pass. This requires some skill to avoid the gate swinging back and striking the vehicle before the vehicle has cleared the path. Accordingly, a bump gate is unsuitable for long vehicles, but some installations incorporate a time-delay return mechanism.

The gate does not swing on a conventional hinge. Instead, it is fastened to cylinders that loosely encircle a tall post. The bump gate's self-closing mechanism utilizes one or two cables from the gate's upper crossbar, terminated high on the post. When the gate swings open, the swivel action as the cables wind around the post raises the gate slightly. After the vehicle passes through, gravity causes the gate to swing back into the closed position. Usually the post is mounted to one side of the roadway, but some gates have the post in the center of a two-lane path. Extra skill is needed not to bump the gate so hard that the other end swings around to strike the rear of the vehicle.

== See also ==
- Cattle grid or cattle guard
- Kissing gate
