= Stile =

Structure providing passage across a fence

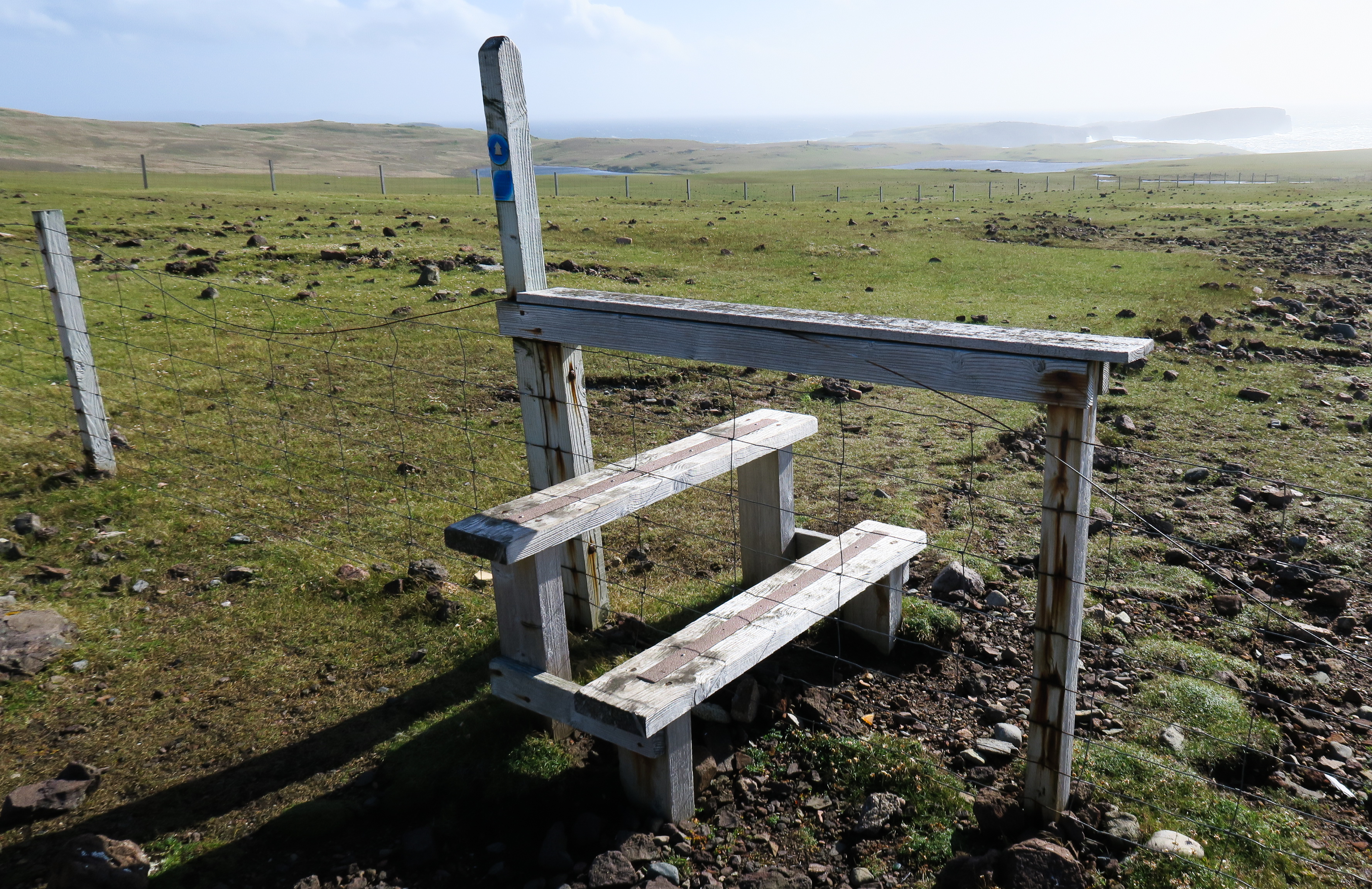
A wooden stile in Esha Ness, Shetland

A stile is a structure or opening that provides passage for humans – rather than animals such as livestock – over or through a boundary. Common forms include steps, ladders, or narrow gaps. Stiles are often built in rural areas along footpaths, fences, walls, or hedges that enclose domestic animals.

== Types ==
In the United Kingdom many stiles were built under legal compulsion (see Rights of way in the United Kingdom). Recent changes in UK government policy towards farming have encouraged upland landowners to make access more available to the public, and this has seen an increase in the number of stiles and an improvement in their overall condition. However, stiles are deprecated and are increasingly being replaced by gates or kissing gates or, where the field is arable, the stile removed. Many legacy stiles remain, however, in a variety of forms (as is also the case in the US, where there is no standard). As well as having a variety of forms, modern stiles also sometimes include a 'dog latch' or 'dog gate' to the side of them, which can be lifted to enable a dog to get through.

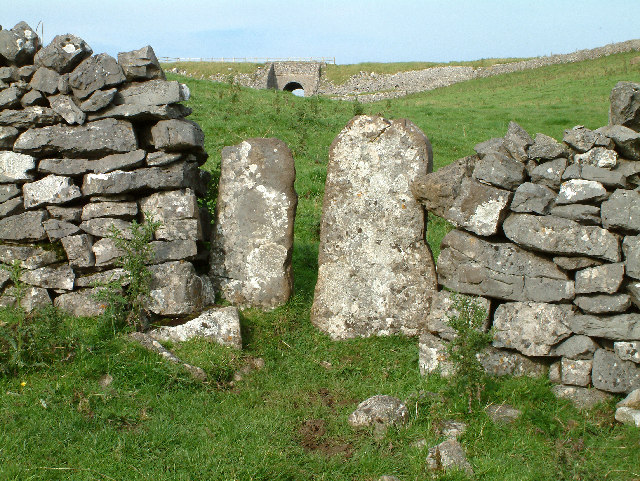
A squeeze stile

Where footpaths cross dry stone walls in England a squeeze stile is sometimes found, a vertical gap in the wall, usually no more than 25 centimetres (9.8 in) wide, often formed by stone pillars on either side to protect the structure of the wall.

== Gallery ==
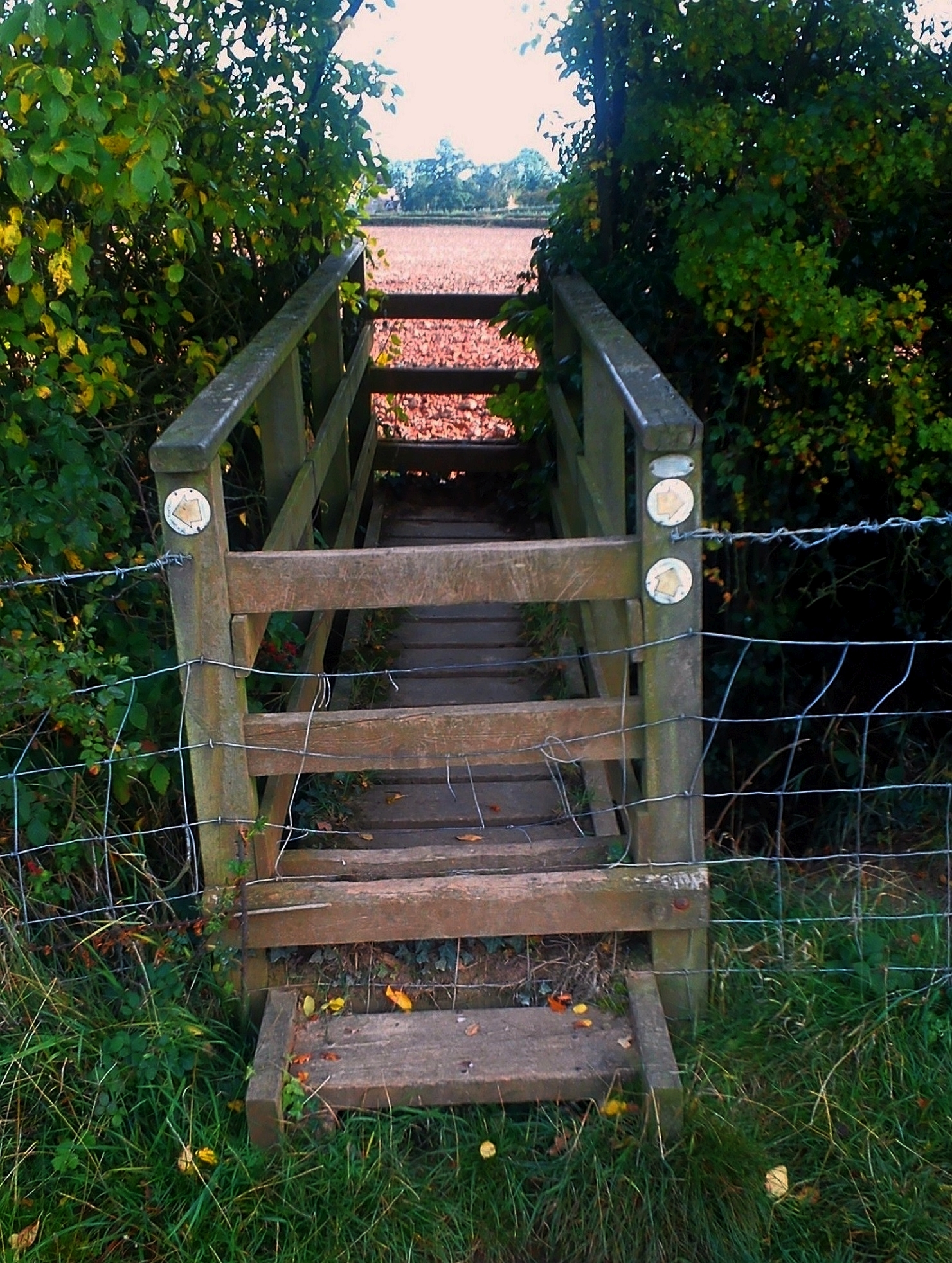
Bridge-shaped stile in Hanbury, Worcestershire

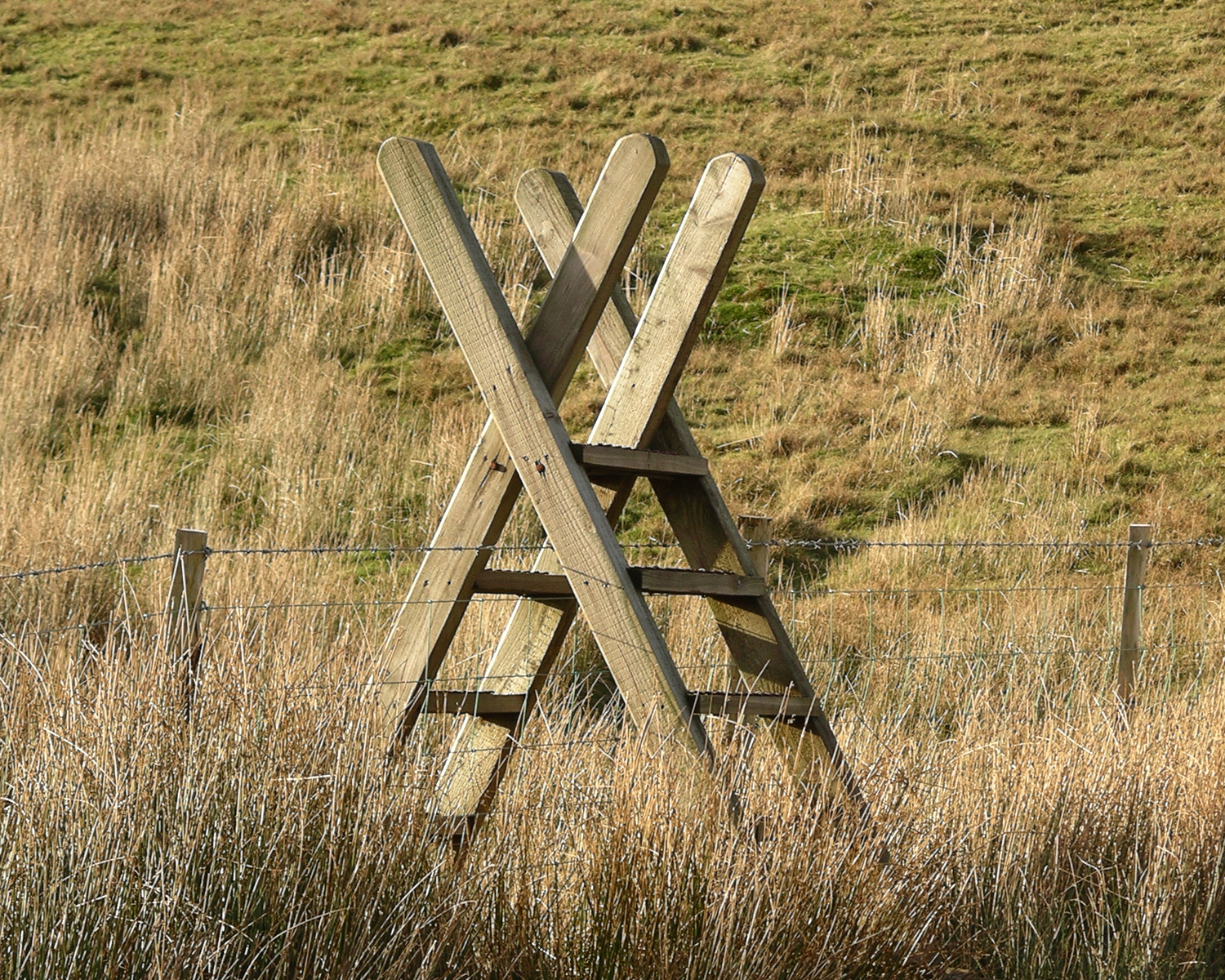
Ladder stile in Snowdonia

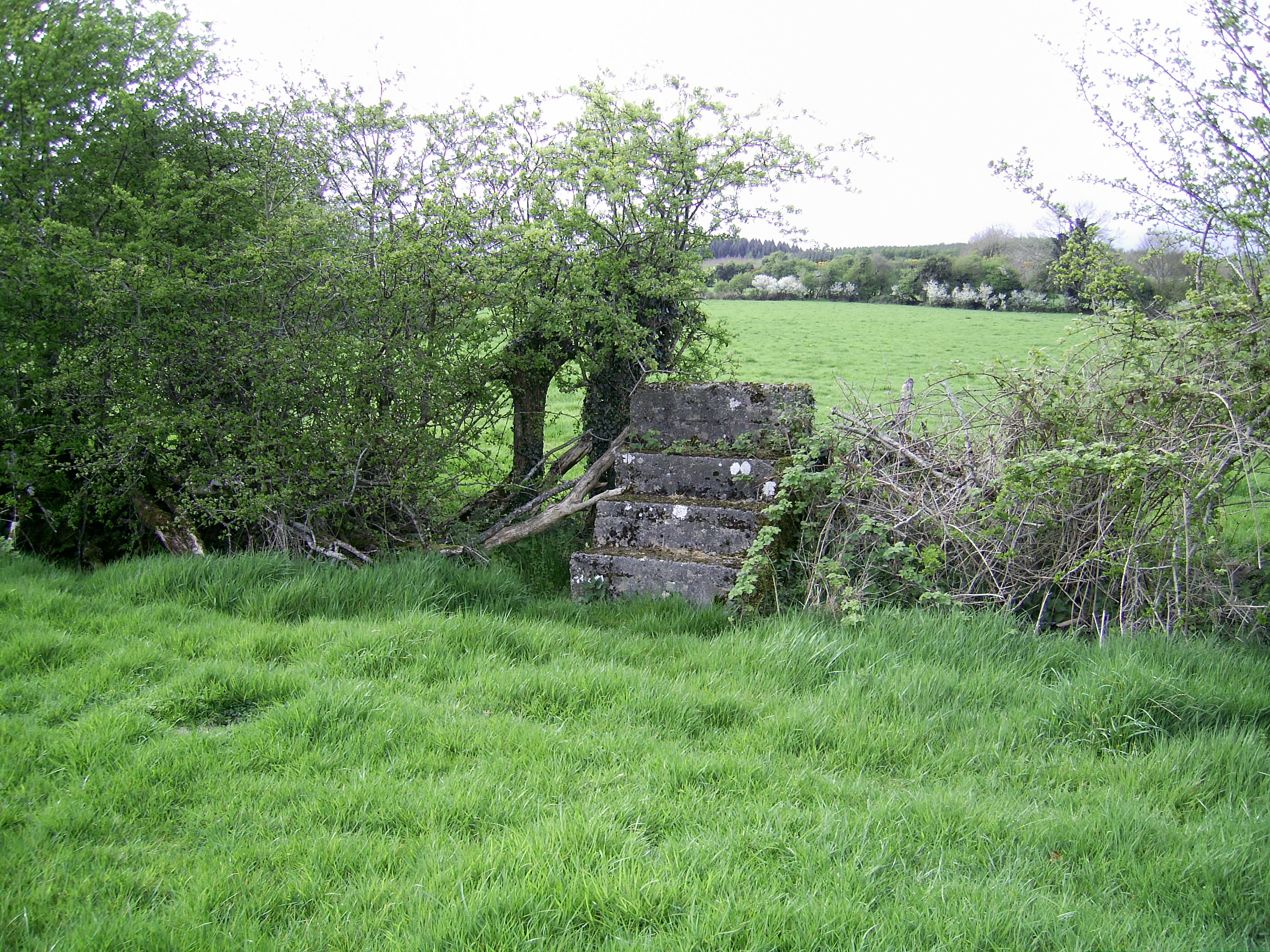
Ranaghan Westmeath Mass-path Stile

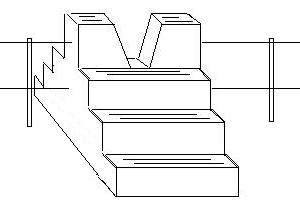
Construction of Ranaghan Mass path Stile

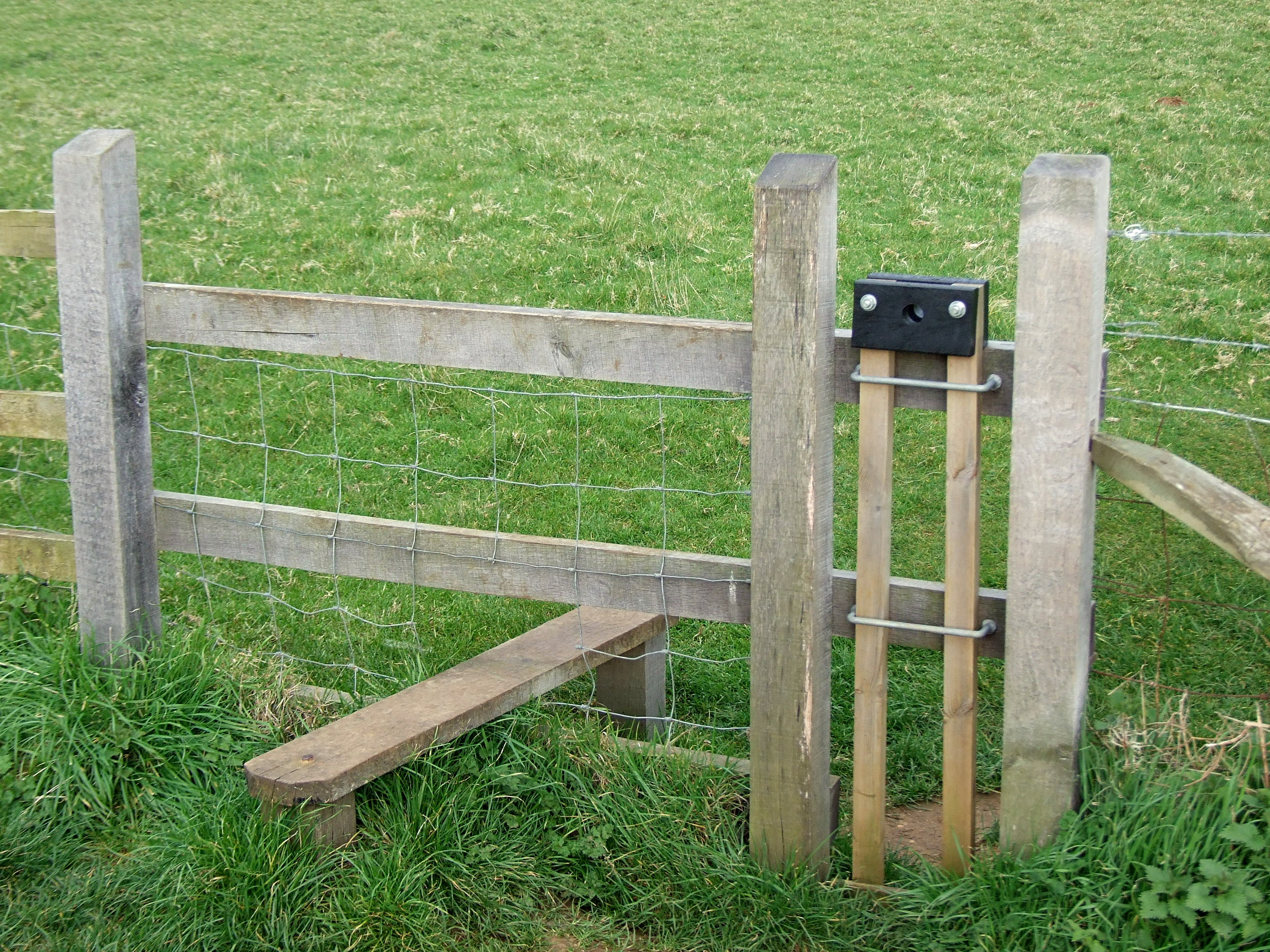
Stile with dog gate

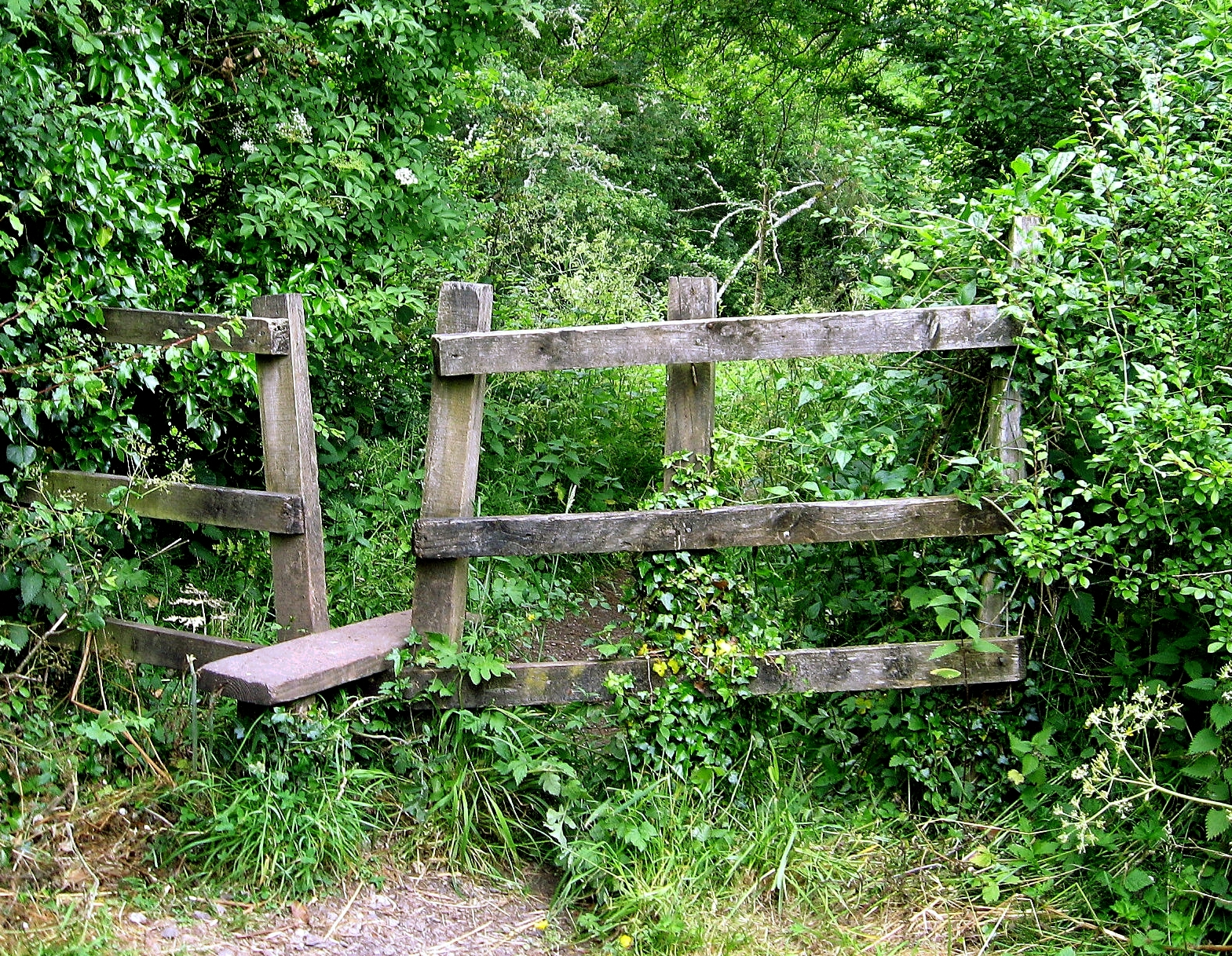
Low-level stile

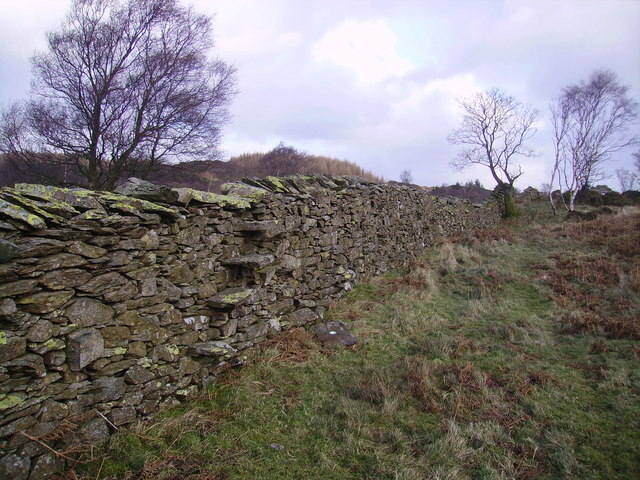
A step stile in the Lake District National Park

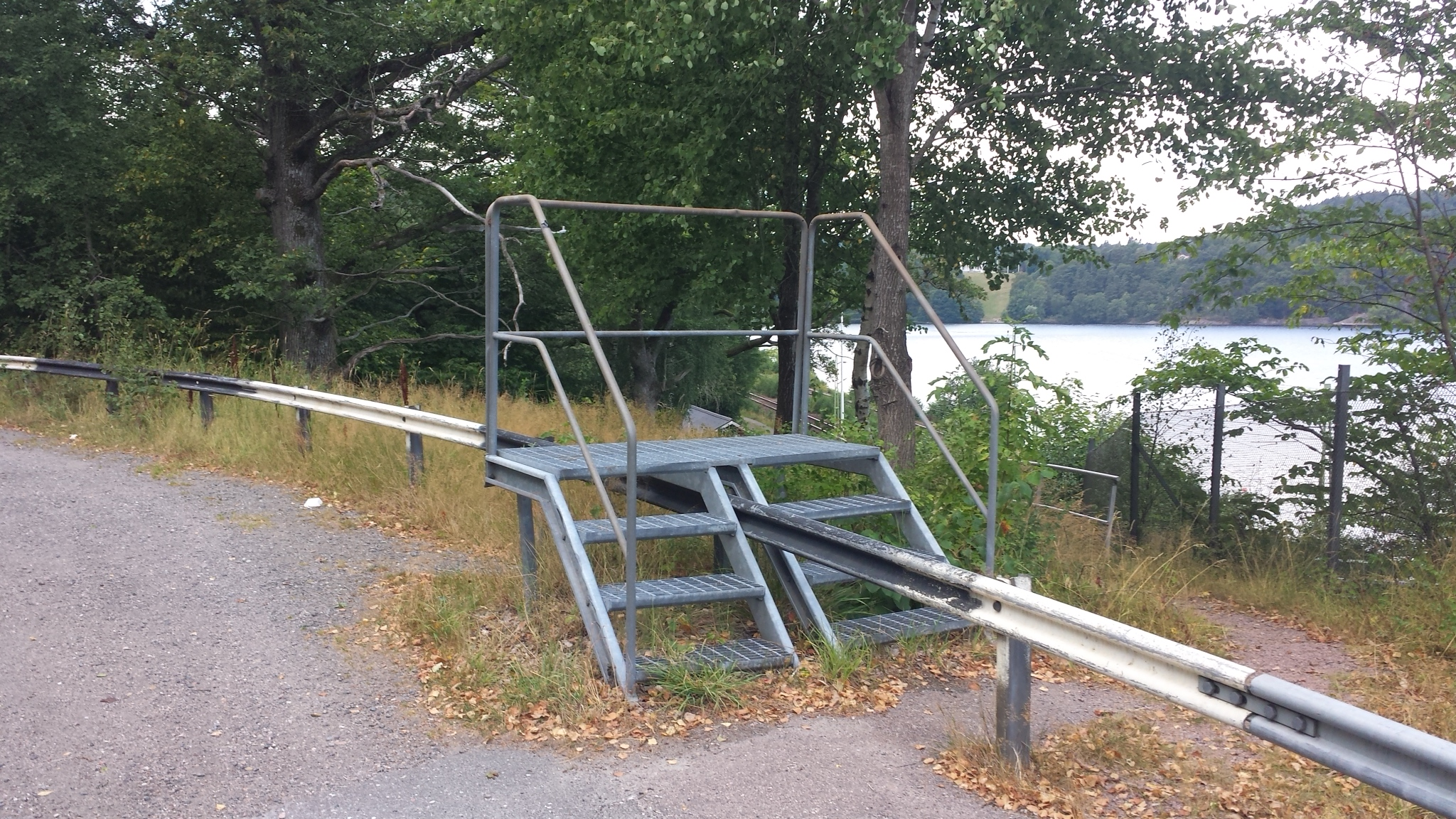
Modern roadside stile in Sweden

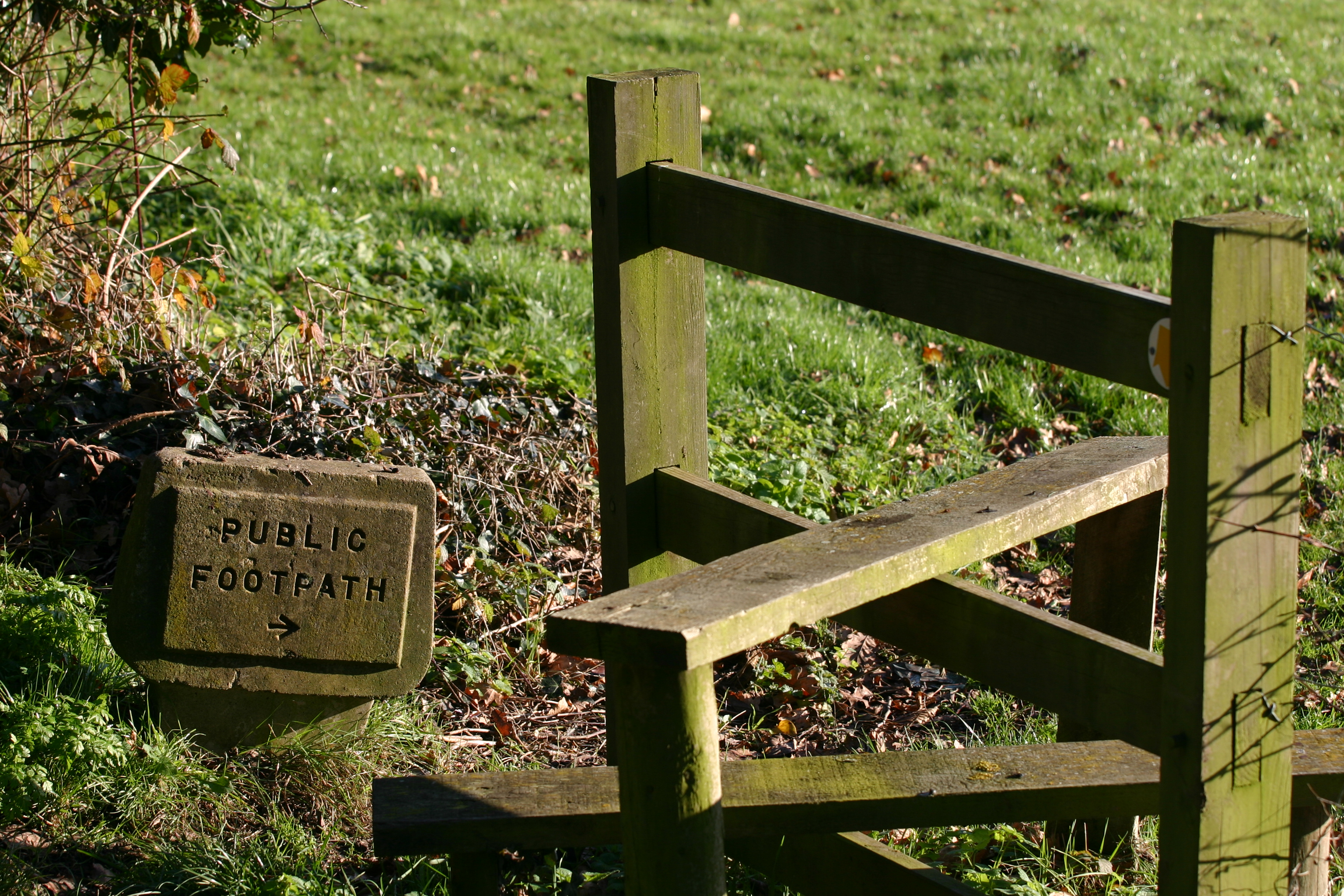
A wooden stile in Kent

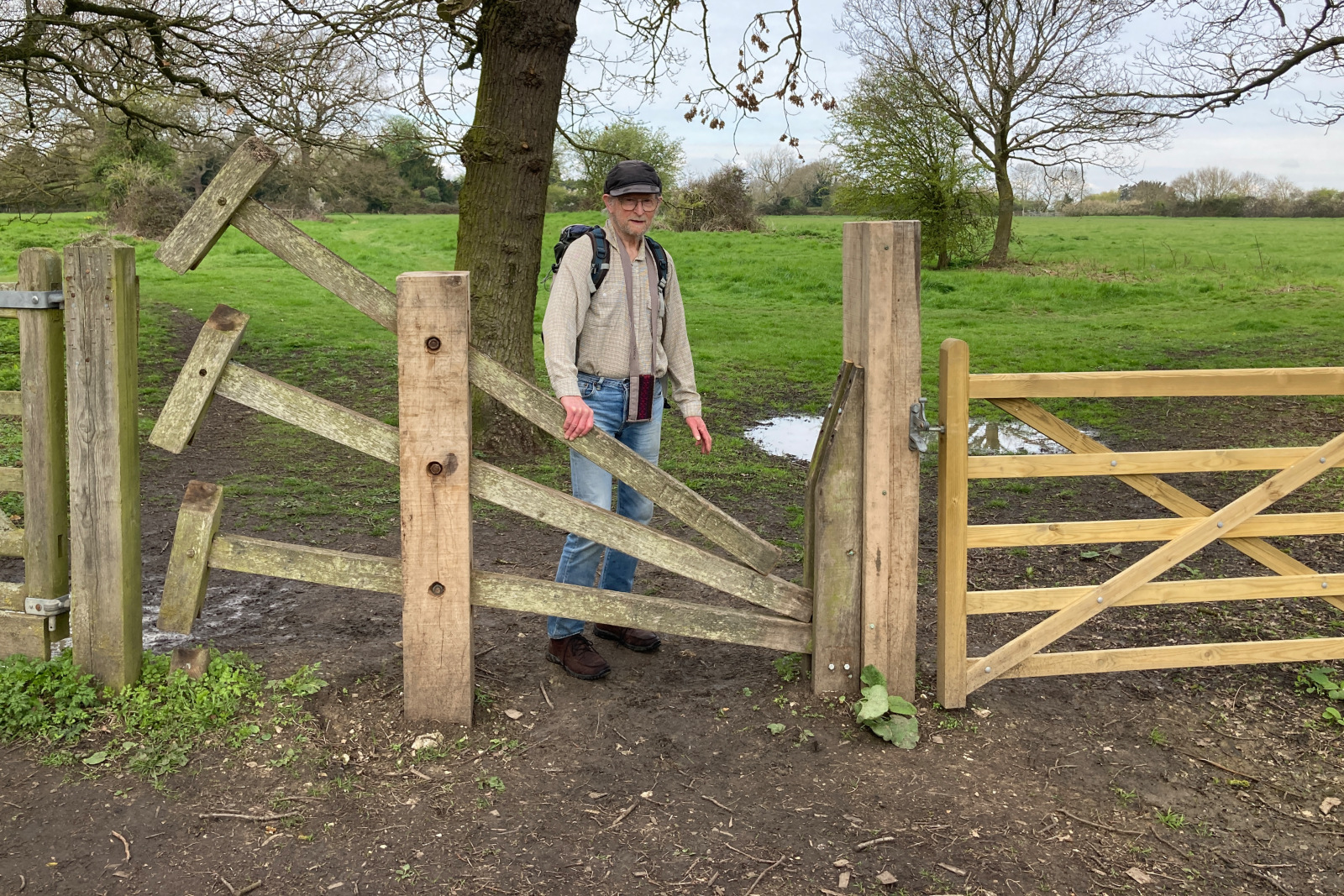
Clapper stile in Rampton, Cambridgeshire

== See also ==
- Cattle grid
- Kissing gate
- Mass path
- Rambler gate
- Turnstile
