= Kissing gate =

Type of gate

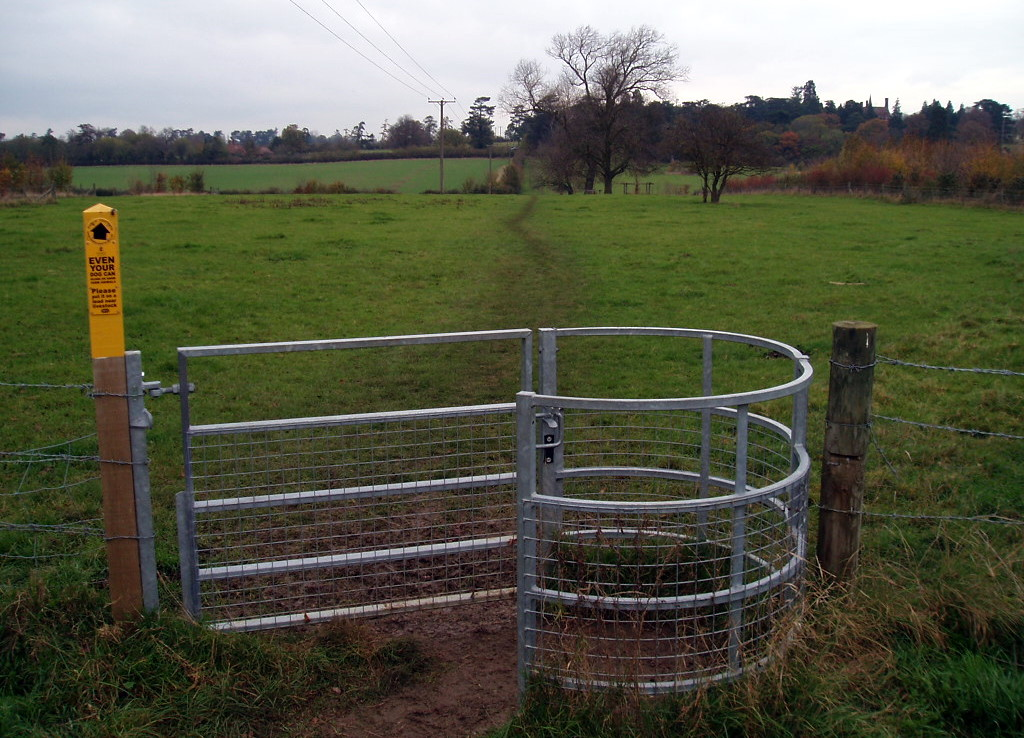
A half-round kissing gate

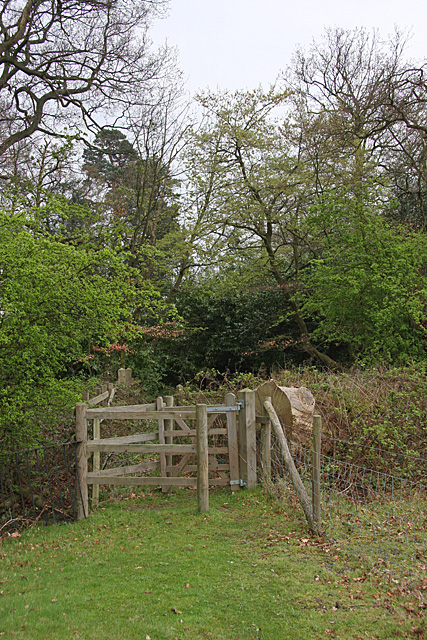
A kissing gate at Wrotham Park

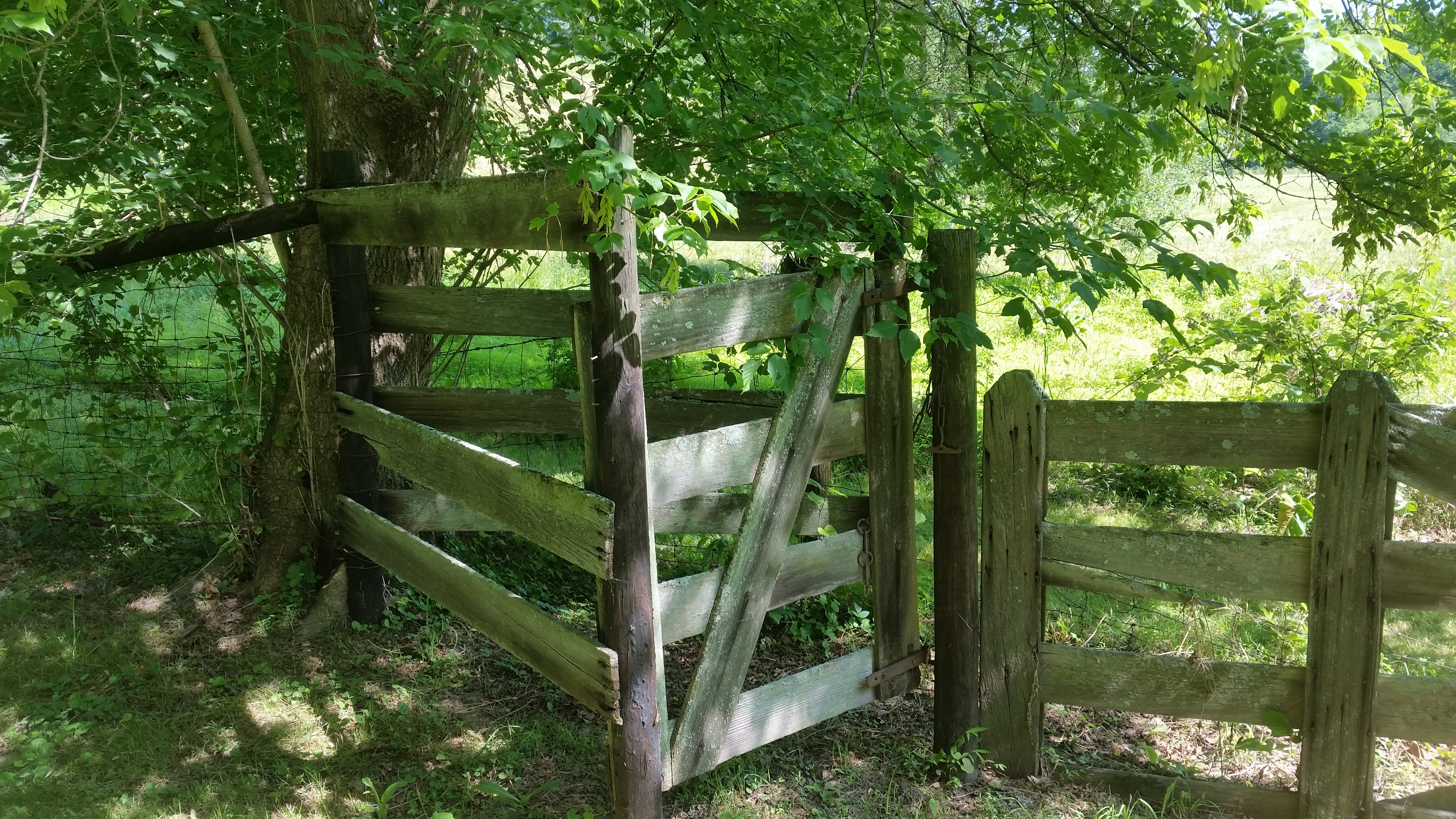
A wooden kissing gate, leading into a pasture, outside of West Chester in Chester County, Pennsylvania

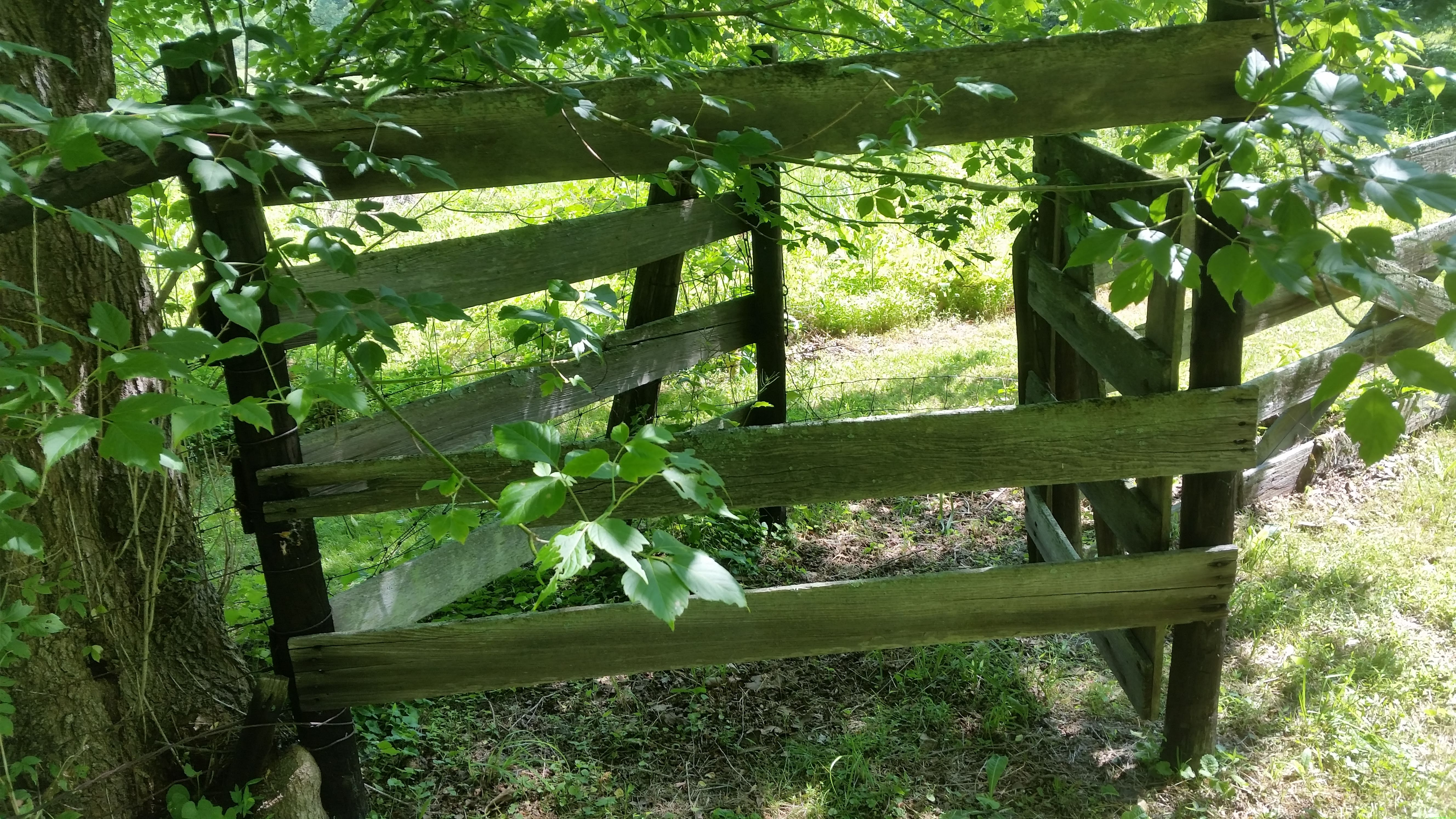
The same gate as the above from another viewpoint, showing how it works

A kissing gate is a gate that allows people, but not livestock, to pass through.

The normal construction is a half-round, rectangular, trapezoidal or V-shaped part-enclosure with the free end of a hinged gate trapped between its arms. When the gate is touching an arm it must be pulled or pushed to pass through. The gate may need to be pushed to give access to the small enclosure, and when in the enclosure the person pulls the gate past the bulk of the enclosure to exit. Some examples have latches. Most are installed self-closing, to the side away from the pasture (livestock field), by hinge geometry, a spring or weight.

The name dates back to at least 1875. It reliably forms a barrier rather than needing to be securely latched on each use. Examples, as with stiles, on footpaths published as accessible are those replaced, improved or supplemented by gates.

== Etymology ==
The term kissing gate appears in English from at least the 19th century. The most widely accepted explanation derives from the older meaning of the verb to kiss, meaning to touch lightly or closely, referring to the way the swinging gate leaf comes into contact with, or “kisses”, the surrounding curved enclosure as it moves. A secondary, more folkloric explanation suggests that the confined space of the gate brought two people into close proximity, encouraging a kiss, though this is generally regarded as a later popular embellishment rather than the origin of the term.

== Criticism ==
Kissing gates are criticized for being built too narrowly to account for the needs of cyclists, parents using baby buggys, and wheelchair users, particularly in urban areas which have minimal requirements for animal control.

== See also ==
- Bump gate
- Rambler gate
- Stile
