= Smart cow problem =

Concept in technology

The smart cow problem is the idea that a technically difficult task may only need to be solved once, by one person, for less technically proficient group members to accomplish the task using an easily repeatable method. The term is derived from the expression: "It only takes one smart cow to open the latch of the gate, and then all the other cows follow."

This concept has been applied to digital rights management (DRM), where, due to the rapid spread of information on the Internet, it only takes one individual's defeat of a DRM scheme to render the method obsolete.

== See also ==
- Egg of Columbus
- Jon Lech Johansen aka "DVD Jon", among the first hackers to crack DVD encryption
- Script kiddie, an unskilled hacker who relies on tools created by others
