= Mass path =

Rural track

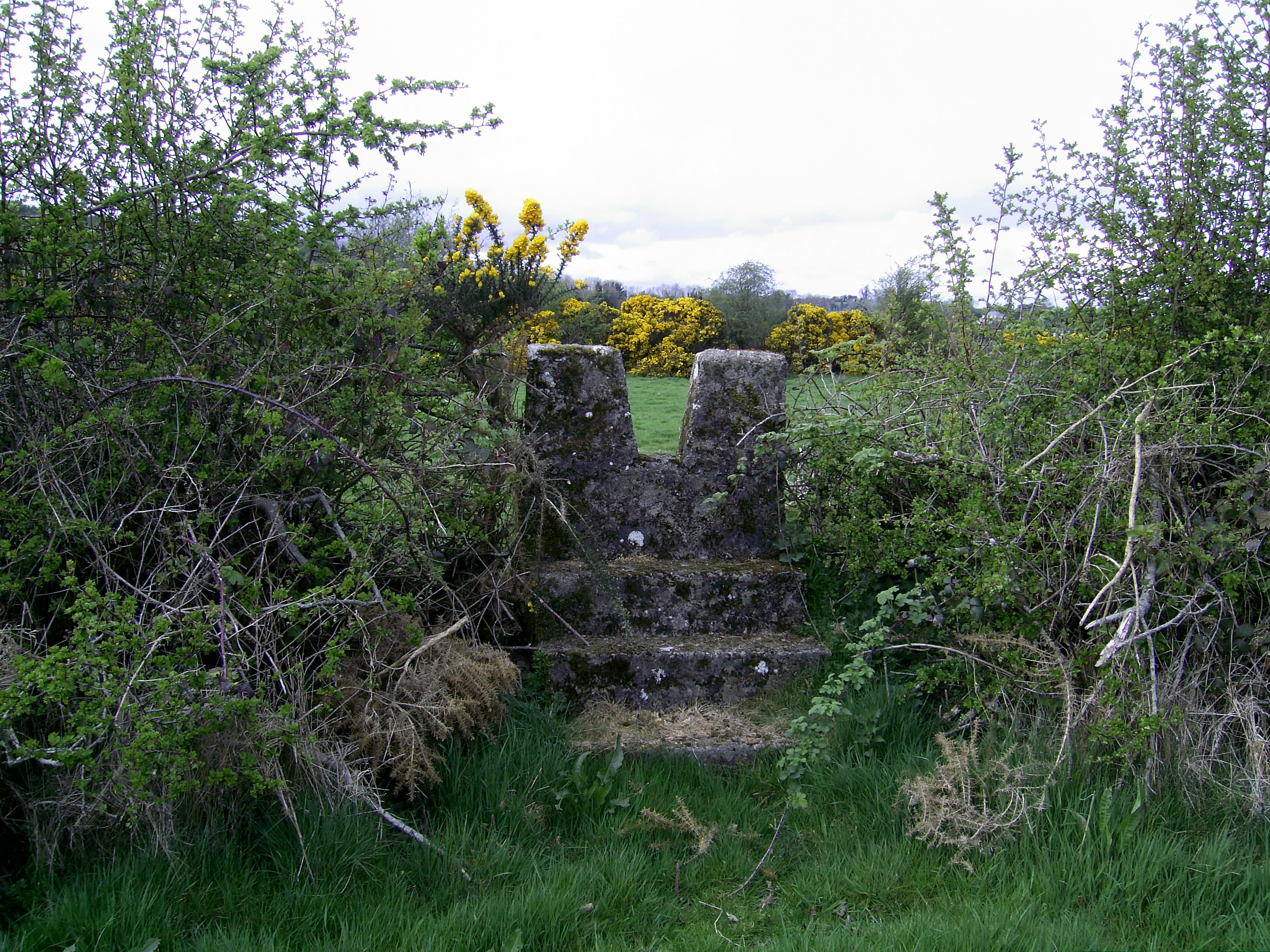
Ranaghan Westmeath mass path stile

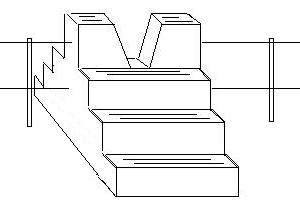
Diagram of a Ranaghan mass path stile's construction

A mass path is a pedestrian track or road connecting destinations frequently used by rural communities, traditionally leading to a church celebrating Sunday Mass. They were most common during the centuries that preceded motorised transportation in Western Europe, and in particular Great Britain, Ireland, and the Netherlands where such a path is called a kerkenpad (lit. 'church path').

Mass paths typically included stretches crossing the fields of neighbouring farmers, and were likely to contain stiles when crossing fences or other boundaries and plank bridges to cross ditches.

Some mass paths are still used today in the Republic of Ireland, but are usually subject to Ireland's complicated rights of way law.

== See also ==
- Corpse road
