= List of Forfarshire cricket captains =

There have been 35 captains of Forfarshire Cricket Club since it was founded. The longest-serving was W. R. Sharp, who held the position for 40 years, albeit having retired from regularly playing by 1908.

== Official captains ==
No.	Name	Nationality	Years	Refs
1	George Cox	Scotland	1880-1884	
2	W. R. Sharp	Scotland	1885-1925	
3	Alan Fraser	Scotland	1925-1926	
4	R. M. Lindsay	Scotland	1927-1929	
5	J. B. Meikle	Scotland	1930-1937	
6	John McNab	Scotland	1938	
7	Alec Luhrs	Scotland	1939; 1949-1951	
8	T. D. Ireland	Scotland	1940-1945	
9	D. C. Stevenson	Scotland	1946	
10	G. D. Burrows	England	1947	
11	T. G. Lamb	Scotland	1948	
12	Jim Henderson	Scotland	1952-1955; 1960-1961	
13	Ally Main	Scotland	1956-1959	
14	Charles Allardyce	Scotland	1962-1963	
15	Drummond Robertson	Scotland	1964-1965; 1972-1975; 1981-1982	
16	Alastair Murray	Scotland	1966-1968	
17	Alex Steele	Scotland	1969; 1976	
18	Keith Wood	Scotland	1970	
19	Earl Reoch	Scotland	1971	
20	Rae McLelland	Scotland	1977-1980; 1987-1988	
21	Dick Auchinleck	Scotland	1983-1985	
22	Clark McConnachie	Scotland	1986	
23	Gordon Walker	Scotland	1989-1990	
24	David Johnston	Scotland	1991-1993	
25	Graeme Garden	Scotland	1994-1995; 1997	
26	Jon Phillips	New Zealand	1996	
27	Barry Stewart	Scotland	1998-2000	
28	Ryan Watson	Scotland	2001-2003; 2009-2011	
29	Tony Weed	Scotland	2004-2005	
30	Peter Drummond	Scotland	2006-2008	
31	Craig Wallace	Scotland	2012-2016	
32	Umair Mohammad	Scotland	2017-2019	
33	Scott Cameron	Scotland	2020-2023; 2025	
34	Jack Hogarth	Scotland	2024	
35	Callum Garden	Scotland	2026-present	

== Match captains ==
During the period between 1908 and 1925, the club captain, W. R. Sharp, retired from playing. The vice-captain took match duties. These included J. A. Kyd (1909), Alec Lindsay (1920-1922) and Alan Fraser (1923-1924). After Sharp's death in 1925, Fraser became club captain.
