= Forfarshire Cricket Club =

- Nickname: The Forfs

Personnel
- Captain: Callum Garden

Team information
- City: Dundee, Scotland
- Colours
- Founded: 1880; 146 years ago
- Home ground: Forthill, Broughty Ferry, Dundee

History
- Grand Final wins: 1 (2019)
- Eastern Premier League wins: 1 (2019)
- Scottish County Championship wins: 15 (including 1 shared)
- Scottish Cup wins: 4
- T20 Scottish Cup wins: 4
- Official website: Forfarshire CC
Home
Alternative

Forfarshire Cricket Club is a cricket club based in Dundee. Since its foundation in 1880 the club has played at Forthill in Broughty Ferry. A founding member of the Scottish County Championship, the club went on to become one of the most successful county sides in the country, winning the title 15 times. The club currently plays in the Eastern Premier League, the highest tier of cricket in Eastern Scotland.

Winner of the inaugural County Championship in 1902, Forfarshire has won many major honours across its 146 year history including the Eastern Premier League and Cricket Scotland Grand Final playoff in 2019 in addition to both the Scottish Cup and T20 Scottish Cup four times each.

== Honours ==
=== First XI ===
- Scottish County Championship (15) – 1902, 1905, 1906 (shared), 1910, 1911, 1920, 1928, 1930, 1932, 1950, 1951, 1957, 1973, 1981, 1992
- Cricket Scotland Grand Final (1) - 2019
- Eastern Premier League (1) - 2019
- Scottish Cup (4) - 1968, 1994, 2022, 2023
- T20 Scottish Cup (4) - 2015, 2019, 2022, 2023
- Eastern Championship (1) - 2013

=== Second XI (Forthill XI) ===
- SPCU First Tier (2) - 1940, 2015
- SPCU Second Tier (3) - 1990, 1994, 2011

=== Other honours ===
- Strathmore Union Three Counties Cup (7) - 1938, 1940, 1955, 1957, 1981, 2008, 2017
- Strathmore Union Two Counties Cup (5) - 1980, 1984, 2008, 2014, 2015

== Early cricket in Dundee and Angus ==
Although cricket had been played in Dundee since at least the 1830s, no club had the luxury of a dedicated pitch to play on. Magdalen Green was a popular location before playing the sport on the public park was effectively banned in the mid 19th century.

== History ==
=== Origin ===
The club was formed officially in June 1879, although no matches were played in that season. George M. Cox, a member of the Cox family which owned Camperdown Works, gathered enough support and funds totalling £300 to form the first cricket club in Dundee or the surrounding area (as Broughty Ferry was a separate burgh at the time) which was to have its own ground. Suitable land was leased on the then-outskirts of Broughty Ferry. A pavilion was built for the opening of the new ground and debut match in 1880.

Forfarshire took its name from the official name of the county of Angus at the time. Cox, who played for Marchbanks CC in Lochee as well as Perthshire before the creation of the new club, wanted to emulate the success of the Perth-based team in his home town.

=== Early years ===
In the first few years of its existence, Forfarshire fielded a poorer team than its neighbours in Perth or Aberdeen. The early professionals brought to the club were highly-regarded players, but not of the calibre required to drive the team to successfully challenge the other county sides.

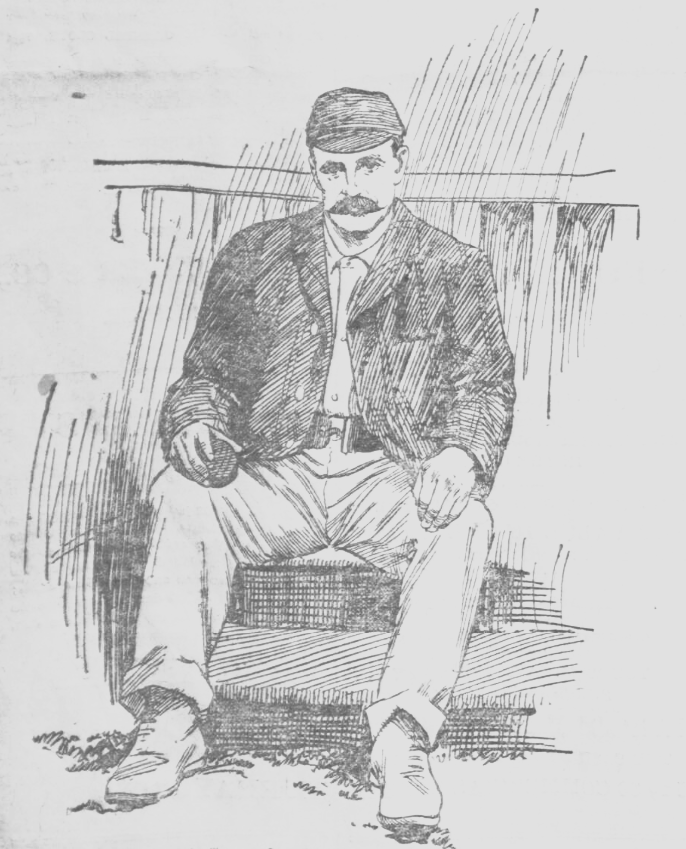
Pat Higgins in 1902

The arrival of new professional Pat Higgins from Guiseley in Yorkshire, in 1883 was seen as a step forward. Although he considered his performances poor in his first season at the club, suffering from a bad illness the previous winter and admitting to having underestimated the quality of Scottish cricket, he was offered the opportunity to return as professional for the 1884 season. The Irish-born player's association with the club would last a total of 33 years.

In 1885, Dundee-born W. R. Sharp was appointed captain. His leadership skills, along with his excellent ability as an all-rounder, allowed the team to flourish under his stewardship. The partnership of Sharp and Higgins over the next quarter of a century became one of the most successful and enduring in the history of Scottish cricket.

In the years since cricket was first played competitively in Scotland, no rivalry has been more fierce than that of Forfarshire and Perthshire. The relatively close proximity of the clubs drew large away crowds to the new fixtures. Perthshire was over 50 years older and had a much more established side but Forfarshire soon became competitive. Of the 22 matches played between 1880 and 1890, both teams had won seven, with eight other matches ending as a draw.

The development of the rivalry meant matches between the two clubs became some of the most anticipated ties on the Scottish cricket calendar. Eventually, derby attendances grew, especially at Forthill, to well over 10,000 on a regular basis. In 1898 the original pavilion was replaced by a new construction financed by club captain W. R. Sharp.

=== Golden era ===
The formation of the County Championship was fundamental to Forfarshire's expansion in the early 20th century. The prominence of the derby with Perthshire grew to become the most important matches of the year. Crowds of over 20,000 attended Forthill, with extra trains between Broughty Ferry and Perth being scheduled on match days to accommodate the large numbers of away supporters.

The winning run or wicket of the inter-county derbies was often followed by pitch invasions; several times Forfarshire players were carried off the pitch to the pavilion on the shoulders of celebrating fans.

As was the case at Forthill, large crowds attended derby matches in Perth. In 1903, while playing a derby match against Perthshire at their home ground on the North Inch, a temporary stand holding nearly 500 spectators collapsed, injuring more than 150 people.

Championship honours were shared with Aberdeen in 1906. W. R. Sharp retired from playing in 1908 and was succeeded as match-day captain by James Kyd; Sharp continued in his role as club captain after retiring. The club won the league outright with back-to-back successes in 1909 and 1910.

=== Interwar period ===
The four years of disruption due to the First World War took its toll on Scottish cricket, with the county championship not returning until 1920. The club's professional in place before the war, Claude Buckenham, returned to the club in 1919 and aided the club in winning the 1920 championship.

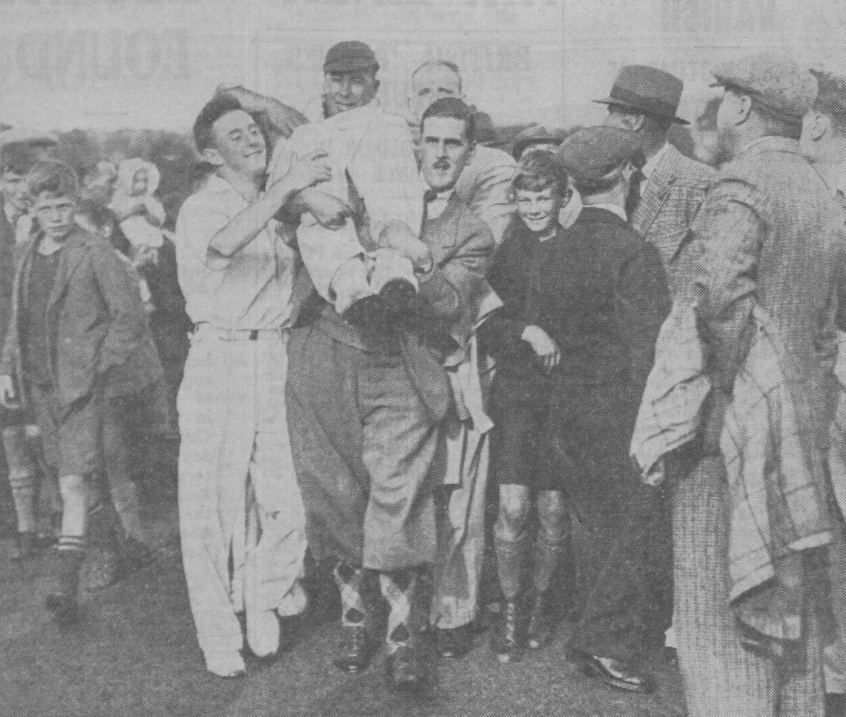
Gordon Hodgson being carried off the field by Forfarshire supporters after taking 8 wickets for only 26 runs against Perthshire in 1936

Although Forfarshire had its own dedicated ground, the club did not own it outright until 1923 when club captain W. R. Sharp, who had at some stage bought the land on which the ground stood, gifted it to Forfarshire.

Sharp continued as club captain until his sudden death in 1925, when he suffered a suspected heart attack while out walking alone near Edzell. His death was followed only three months later by that of his long-time batting partner Pat Higgins, who also died of a heart attack at his home in Menston near Leeds.

Several high-profile professionals played for the club in the interwar period, including Gordon Hodgson for the 1935-36 seasons, who previously played for Lancashire and was also an England international footballer who played for Liverpool at the time.

The club won the county championship again in 1928, 1930 and 1932.

=== Post-war ===
Following the Second World War, the club were without a professional for one year. In 1947, former Middlesex player Bill Etherington was signed. In May, the decision was made to trial a 'Talent Money' system which saw Etherington awarded a bonus for more than five wickets taken, as well as for scoring 50 or 100 runs in a match. Despite the financial incentives presented to him, Etherington never settled in Scotland. After a difficult spell with illness, including relapsing malaria, he was forced to resign and returned to London in late July. The club was unable to fund a replacement and again went without a professional for a large part of the season.

The club went without domestic success for several years after the War, before winning the County Championship in two successive years in 1950 and 1951. Following another barren spell, Forfarshire again won the championship in 1957.

=== Later county years ===
Despite the draw of cricket not being nearly as strong as it had been in the inter-war period, and the club's status far-diminshed from its golden years in the early part of the 20th century, the average attendance at Forthill was thought to be 5,000 until the early 1960s, after which attendances slumped to all-time lows. Without the financial benefits of paying spectators, the club was forced to make long-term cuts to several areas, including no longer employing a professional each year.

The 1960s was as difficult a decade on the pitch as it was in the boardroom, with Forfarshire's rivals Perthshire winning the County Championship in eight out of ten years. Some success was found, however, in the fledgling Scottish Cup, which was won by the club in 1968.

In 1973, Forfarshire stopped Perthshire from winning an eighth consecutive championship, winning the league for the first time in 16 years. The club would then wait another eight years, until 1981, to win the championship. It was in this season that the first professional since Jack Dyson in 1962 was signed, this time Australian Andrew Hilditch.

The club's final Championship success was in 1992. Of the three most successful clubs in Scottish county cricket, Forfarshire's victory was the last; neither Perthshire nor Aberdeenshire would win the league again before it was dissolved after the 1995 season, albeit Aberdeenshire were denied the final season after being forced to forfeit a match.

=== After county cricket ===
Due to poor league finishes in the final three years of the county championship, Forfarshire was placed in the Second Division of the new SNCL. Over the next seven seasons Forfarshire remained outside the first tier, other than 1998 when the SNCL trialled a different league format. The club was promoted to the Premier Division for the 2003 season. This proved to be a short stay, with Forfarshire relegated back to the second tier in 2004. Another five years would pass before the club was again promoted.

In the final season of the SNCL in 2011, Forfarshire achieved its best finish in the tournament, third place out of the 16 teams in the final league format. The SNCL was subsequently disbanded and is now largely seen as a failed experiment which weakened the standing of Scottish domestic cricket.

=== Present day ===
In recent years, Forfarshire have won several honours, including the T20 Scottish Cup and the Eastern Premier League in 2019. Winning the league meant the opportunity to play in the Cricket Scotland Grand Final against the winner of the Western Premiership. Forfarshire beat their opponents, Uddingston, crowning them 2019 Scottish champions.

This was followed by two successive cup doubles, winning the Scottish Cup and T20 Scottish Cup in 2022 and 2023.

By winning the T20 Scottish Cup, Forfarshire gained a place in the T10 European Cricket League, hosted at the Cártama Oval Cricket Ground in Spain. The club was first scheduled to compete in the tournament in 2020 after winning the T20 Scottish cup the previous year but the tournament was cancelled due to the COVID-19 pandemic. In 2023 the club came second in its group table and was knocked out.

Forfarshire's tournament in 2024 was more successful, qualifying from the initial group stage to contest matches in the second group stage. After winning only one game, the club was again eliminated.

In 2024 the club finished in third place in the Eastern Premier League. Due to representatives failing to submit captain's reports, Forfarshire was deducted five points in the final table.

== Home ground ==
Forthill was initially leased for ten years by the new cricket club from a local landowner, Sylvester Kerr. Its main appeal was the short distance to Broughty Ferry station as well as the views of the surrounding countryside at that time.

== Sponsorship ==
Period	Kit Manufacturer	Shirt Sponsor
2006-2009	None	Deuchars IPA
2010-2012	Canterbury	None
2013-2016	Adidas	Autoecosse
2017-2018	Adidas	Tayside Group
2019-2021	Gray-Nicolls	ION8
2022	Gray-Nicolls	DC Consulting
2023-2025	Gray-Nicolls	ABP Food Group
2026-	Grizzly Bear Sports	ABP Food Group

== Players ==
=== Internationals ===
Name	Year
W. R. Sharp	1902
Robert Tait	1907
George Chalmers	1908
Billy Ringrose	1908
Alexander Lindsay	1909
Henry Nicoll	1914
David Stevenson	1922
John Russell	1923
Alexander Simpson	1924
William Young	1924
John Farquhar	1930
John Melville	1932

Name	Year
James Henderson	1946
Stuart Wilson	1957
Alex Steele	1967
Peter Rhind	1968
Earl Reoch	1973
Stewart Bruce	2004
Ryan Watson	2006
Craig Wallace	2012
Michael Leask	2014
Scott Cameron	2018
Charlie Cassell	2024

=== Hall of Fame ===
2019

- Alex Steele
- Umair Mohammed
- Graeme Garden

2022

- Dick Auchinleck
- Rae McLelland

2024

- Craig Wallace

== Professionals ==
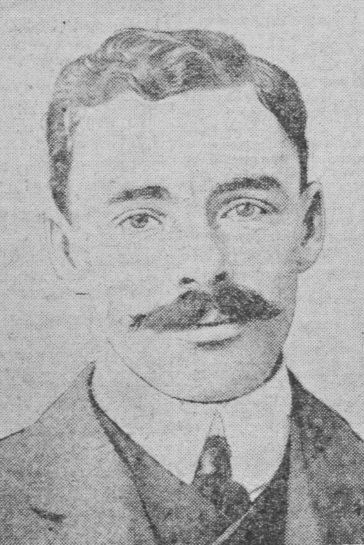
Billy Ringrose

Since the club's formation, Forfarshire has had many professionals at the club. During the halcyon years of Scottish county cricket from 1902 to 1914, Forfarshire employed at least two professionals. For several years there were three professionals: veteran Pat Higgins and his two understudies, former Nottinghamshire player George Chambers and Scotland-capped Billy Ringrose.

Forfarshire's first overseas professional was Dickie Fuller, a Jamaican who played several matches for his home nation as well as one test for the West Indies. He played three seasons between 1949 and 1951. Alf Pope was then signed as professional until 1956. The following year, the club again looked to the West Indies and signed Barbadian player Clairmonte Depeiaza who also played for the club for three seasons.

Ceylonese player Bob Bartels was employed for one season followed by Lancashire player, and FA Cup-winning footballer, Jack Dyson. Dyson had left Lancashire after disciplinary action and his signing by Forfarshire was seen as a major coup. Due to two serious leg breaks he was unable to perform at the same footballing level for Manchester City and looked for a Scottish club to move to in conjunction with his move to Forthill, accepting an offer from Stirling Albion.

Dyson left to return to Lancashire in 1962 and following this, due to monetary constraints, no professional was employed by the club for a period of 19 years. By the time the club's financial outlook had improved, Scottish teams could no longer afford the wages competent English players could earn south of the border. This led the club to begin to look overseas once again, this time to Australia and India.

Michael Leask became the club's first professional in a number of years when he signed on in 2023, having already been playing for the club as an amateur.

== Club officials ==
=== Club officers ===
Position	Name
President	Elaine Sim
Secretary	Paul Whitehead
Treasurer	Graham McLelland

== See also ==
- Cricket in Scotland
