= List of Forfarshire cricket professionals =

Forfarshire Cricket Club has employed many professionals since its foundation in 1880.

== Professionals ==
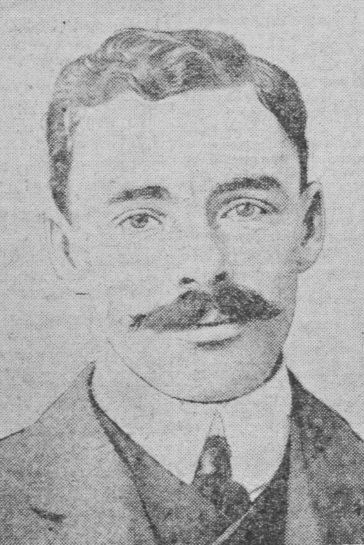
Billy Ringrose was capped by Scotland whilst a Forfarshire professional

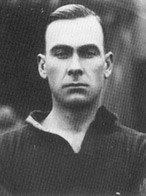
Liverpool legend Gordon Hodgson was one of a number of footballers to play for Forfarshire during the football off-season

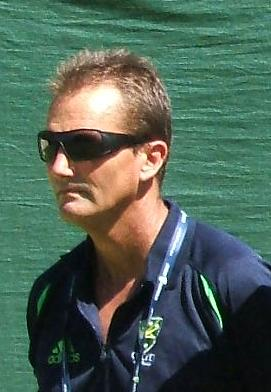
Andrew Hilditch had played in three tests for Australia before he arrived at Forthill in 1981

Name	Period	Ref
(England) Charles Keeping	1880	
(England) Peter Pullan	1881	
(England) Joe Todd	1882	
(Ireland) (England) Pat Higgins	1883-1915	
(England) George Chambers	1901-1903	
(England) George Chambers	1906-1911	
(England) Harry Bettison	1904	
(England) Albert Mortimer	1905	
(England) A. Drury	1906	
(England) (Scotland) Billy Ringrose	1907-1912	
(England) Joe Winyard	1913-1914	
(England) Claude Buckenham	1914	
(England) Claude Buckenham	1919-1921	
None	1915-1918	
(England) Hugh Claughton	1922-1923	
(England) Hugh Claughton	1926-1927	
None	1924	
(England) Frederick Hyland	1925	
(England) George Wilson	1928-1931	
(England) Frank Smailes	1931-1932	
(England) Bill Andrews	1933-1934	
(England) Gordon Hodgson	1935-1936	
(England) Jim Cutmore	1936	
(England) Harold Greenwood	1937	

Name	Period	Ref
(Wales) George Lavis	1938-1939	
None	1940-1946	
(England) Bill Etherington	1947	
(England) Tony Mills	1948	
(Cricket West Indies) Dickie Fuller	1949-1951	
(England) Alf Pope	1952-1956	
(Cricket West Indies) Clairmonte Depeiaza	1957-1959	
(Dominion of Ceylon) Bob Bartels	1960	
(England) Jack Dyson	1961-1962	
None	1963-1980	
(Australia) Andrew Hilditch	1981	
(Australia) Steve Bernard	1982	
(Australia) Steve Bernard	1985	
(Australia) Gary Whitaker	1984	
(India) Shishir Hattangadi	1987-1990	
(Australia) Simon Mann	1992	
(Australia) Richard Chee Quee	1993	
None	1994	
(Australia) Peter Drinnen	1995-2003	
(Australia) Luke Gleeson	2004	
(Australia) Tom Cooper	2008	
(Australia) Kelby Pickering	2009-2010	
(Scotland) Michael Leask	2023	
