= Cricket Scotland Grand Final =

Cricket playoff in Scotland

- Countries: Scotland
- Administrator: Cricket Scotland
- Format: Limited overs
- First edition: 2012
- Latest edition: 2025
- Next edition: 2026
- Tournament format: Playoff
- Number of teams: 2
- Current champion: Clydesdale
- Most successful: Grange (3 titles)

The Cricket Scotland Grand Final, officially the Cricket Scotland Premier League Grand Final, is an annual playoff match between the winners of the two highest regional cricket leagues in Scotland, the Eastern Premier League and the Western Premiership. The winner of the playoff becomes the national champion. The current champions are Clydesdale.

== History ==
After the fragmentation of the Scotland-wide Scottish National Cricket League (SNCL) into separate regional leagues, the joint highest in the new pyramid became the Eastern Premier League and Western Premiership. To determine the Scotland-wide champion for the season, the Grand Final was created as a playoff between the champions of the two leagues.

The Grand Final trophy was named the Willie Morton Trophy in honour of former Scotland all-rounder Willie Morton.

=== Grand Final Results ===
Season	Winner	Winning Margin	Runner-up	Venue	City/Town	Source
2012	Watsonians	Won by 3 wickets	Dumfries	Grange Loan	Edinburgh	
2013	Arbroath United	Won by 6 wickets	Uddingston	Hamilton Crescent	Glasgow	
2014	Aberdeenshire	Won by 5 wickets	Ayr	The Grange	Edinburgh	
2015	Grange	Won by 90 runs	Clydesdale	Bothwell Castle	Uddingston	
2016	Carlton	Won by 114 runs	Clydesdale	Grange Loan	Edinburgh	
2017	Prestwick	Won by 5 runs	Heriot's	Meikleriggs	Paisley	
2018	Grange	Won by 126 runs	Ferguslie	Lochlands	Arbroath	
2019	Forfarshire	Won by 4 wickets	Uddingston	The Grange	Edinburgh	
2020	(Cancelled due to COVID-19 pandemic)					
2021	(Cancelled due to COVID-19 pandemic)					
2022	Ferguslie	Won by 103 runs (DLS)	Heriot's	Bothwell Castle	Uddingston	
2023	Grange	Won by 99 runs	Ayr	Forthill	Dundee	
2024	Heriot's	Won by 4 runs	Clydesdale	Titwood	Glasgow	
2025	Clydesdale	Won by 6 wickets	Heriot's	Grange Loan	Edinburgh	

== See also ==
Cricket in Scotland
