= Terry Racionzer =

Personal information
- Full name: Terence Beverley Racionzer
- Born: 18 December 1943 (age 82); Maidenhead, England
- Batting: Right-handed
- Bowling: Right-arm off break
- Role: Batsman

International information
- National side: Scotland (1965–1984)

Domestic team information
- Years: Team
- 1967–1969: Sussex
- 1980–1984: Scotland

Career statistics
Competition	First-class	List A
Matches	45	20
Runs scored	1,552	282
Batting average	21.85	15.66
100s/50s	1/11	0/1
Top score	115	61
Balls bowled	128	180
Wickets	2	2
Bowling average	35.50	78.50
5 wickets in innings	0	0
10 wickets in match	0	0
Best bowling	2/11	1/29
Catches/stumpings	35/–	5/–
- Source: CricketArchive, 16 March 2018

Terence Beverley Racionzer (born 18 December 1943) is a Scottish businessman and former cricketer. A batsman, he played first-class cricket for Sussex and Scotland and is a member of the Scottish Cricket Hall of Fame. In business, he was chairman of the Scottish footwear retailer Schuh.

== Early life ==
Terry Racionzer was born in Maidenhead, Berkshire, England, before moving to Glasgow, Scotland. He was educated at Queen's Park Secondary School and the University of Glasgow. From a Jewish family, his great-grandparents emigrated from Poland to London in the 19th century before settling in Glasgow.

== Cricket career ==
A right-handed batsman and off spin bowler, Racionzer played for Clydesdale Cricket Club in Glasgow from 1960 to 1990. He scored 11,004 runs in the Western District Cricket Union for Clydesdale, making him the club's top scorer in the competition by a 6,000 run margin, with his highest score being 123 against Drumpellier in 1975. He also took 255 wickets.

Racionzer made his first appearance for Scotland in August 1965, playing against Ireland at Sydney Parade in Dublin, in what was also his first-class debut. He top-scored with 57 runs as Scotland won by an innings. Racionzer made a total of 65 appearances for Scotland in cap matches, scoring 2,807 runs in 107 innings at an average of 26.2, including 5 centuries and 16 fifties.

Between 1967 and 1969, Racionzer played county cricket in England for Sussex. During his career he played a total of 45 first-class matches for Scotland and Sussex, scoring 1,552 runs at an average of 21.85. He scored his only first-class hundred for Scotland against Ireland at Downpatrick in 1983, making 115 runs in the first innings. His final first-class appearance, also against Ireland, was on his home club ground, Titwood in Glasgow, in August 1984. He also made 20 appearances for Scotland and Sussex in List A matches between 1968 and 1984.

Racionzer has been inducted by Cricket Scotland into their Scottish Cricket Hall of Fame.

== Business career ==
Racionzer was a freelance business consultant before joining Scottish footwear retailer Schuh in 1990. As chairman, he was instrumental in the company's growth from its Edinburgh origins to a major nationwide chain. He has continued to be involved in Scottish cricket, forming the Cricket Scotland Development Trust as a joint initiative with Cricket Scotland in 2009, and chairing it until 2013. He also funded a scholarship scheme giving promising young Scottish cricketers opportunities to gain experience playing in Australia.
