= T20 Scottish Cup =

Highest level of Twenty20 club cricket played in Scotland

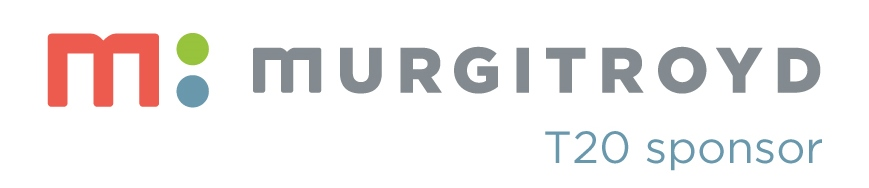
- Former logo
- Countries: Scotland
- Administrator: Cricket Scotland
- Format: Twenty20
- First edition: 2008
- Tournament format: Playoff between regional competition winners
- Number of teams: 4
- Current trophy holder: Grange
- Most successful: Carlton (5)
- Website: Men's T20 Scottish Cup

The T20 Scottish Cup competition is the highest level of Twenty20 club cricket played in Scotland. The national competition, comprisied four regional qualifying competitions - the Rowan Cup (played in the west region), the Masterton Trophy (played in the east region), the Caledonian T20 (played in the north region) and the Borders T20 (played in the south region) - and a Finals Day is organised by Cricket Scotland.

Between 2008 and 2019 the competition was sponsored by Glasgow-based international intellectual property business, Murgitroyd.

== Winners ==
As of 2025 the competition winners were:

- 2008: Carlton Cricket Club
- 2009: Greenock Cricket Club
- 2010: Carlton Cricket Club
- 2011: Carlton Cricket Club
- 2012: Carlton Cricket Club
- 2013: Grange Cricket Club
- 2014: Grange Cricket Club
- 2015: Forfarshire Cricket Club
- 2016: Grange Cricket Club
- 2017: Watsonians Cricket Club
- 2018: Heriot's Cricket Club
- 2019: Forfarshire Cricket Club
- 2020: No competition
- 2021: Carlton Cricket Club
- 2022: Forfarshire Cricket Club
- 2023: Forfarshire Cricket Club
- 2024: Grange Cricket Club
- 2025: Heriot's Cricket Club

== See also ==
- Regional Pro Series
