= Scottish Cup (cricket) =

Scottish cricket knockout competition

- Countries: Scotland
- Administrator: Cricket Scotland
- Format: Limited overs cricket
- First edition: 1966
- Latest edition: 2025
- Next edition: 2026
- Tournament format: Knockout
- Current champion: Clydesdale (8th title)
- Most successful: Grange (9 titles)

The Scottish Cup, officially the Cricket Scotland Men's Scottish Cup, is an annual fifty-over limited overs cricket competition in Scotland. Founded in 1966 as the Rothmans Quaich due to sponsorship by Rothmans of Pall Mall, it is the most prestigious cricket cup competition in the country. The current champions are Clydesdale.

== Teams ==
The competition is played by the teams in the Eastern Premier League, Western Premiership One, ESCA Championship, Western Premiership 2 and the SPCU North-east Championship.

== Sponsorship ==
Period	Sponsor	Name
1966-1976	Rothmans of Pall Mall	Rothmans Quaich
1977-1981	Shish Mahal Restaurants	Shish Mahal Scottish Cup
1982-1989	Knight, Frank & Rutley	Knight, Frank & Rutley Scottish Cup
1990	None	Scottish Cup
1991-1998	Whyte & Mackay	Whyte & Mackay Scottish Cup
1999-2001	None	Scottish Cup
2002-2005	Coronel	Coronel Scottish Cup
2006	None	Scottish Cup
2008-2009	Lloyds TSB	Lloyds TSB Scottish Cup
2010-2015	None	Scottish Cup
2016-2022	Citylets	Citylets Scottish Cup
2023–present	None	Scottish Cup

== See also ==
Cricket in Scotland
