= Forfarshire-Perthshire cricket rivalry =

Historical rivalry in Scottish cricket

Forfarshire-Perthshire rivalry
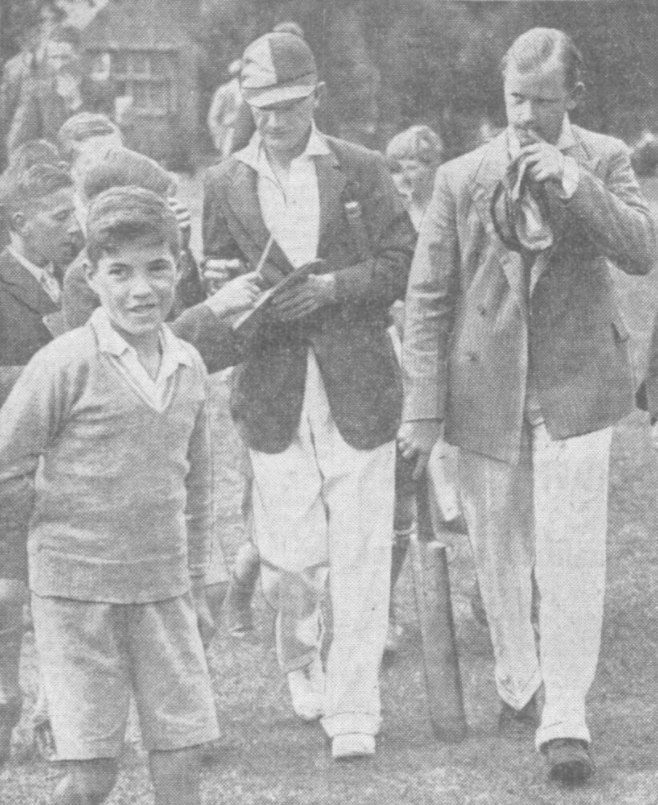
- Forfarshire's captain John McNab (centre) and his Perthshire counterpart R. A. Lyle swarmed by autograph hunters before a match in 1935
- Other names: Scotland's greatest cricket match
- Sport: Cricket
- Location: Scotland
- Teams: Forfarshire; Perthshire
- First meeting: Friendly: 26 June 1880 (Perthshire won by 98 runs); County: 5 July 1902 (Forfarshire won by 6 wickets); SNCL Division One: 1 June 1996 (Forfarshire won by 7 wickets)
- Latest meeting: SNCL Division One: 31 July 1999 (match drawn)
- Stadiums: Forthill; North Inch

Statistics
- Total meetings: County: TBD; SNCL: 5
- Most wins: County: (Forfarshire TBD; Perthshire TBD); SNCL: (Forfarshire 4; Perthshire 0)

The Forfarshire-Perthshire cricket rivalry was a domestic rivalry within the sport of cricket. It was notable for its fierce competition and, in the early part of the 20th century, its large attendances.

Forfarshire and Perthshire last played each other in the Scottish National Cricket League Division One in 1999, after which Perthshire's financial struggles saw them relegated to the feeder leagues of the SNCL before being dissolved in 2009.

In its heyday, the derby, as it had come to be called by the press, was regularly touted as the Scottish equivalent to the Roses Match between Lancashire and Yorkshire. However, those familiar with both rivalries noted that the intense hostility the crowd possessed towards opposition players at either Forthill or the North Inch was often more prominent than in England at that time.

== History ==
The first inter-county between the sides was in 1880, when the newly-formed Forfarshire arranged a series of friendlies with nearby clubs, including Perthshire. The Big County won handsomely with Forfarshire's inexperience apparent; seven of Forfarshire's players went out for a duck in the first innings.

Over the following years, with Forfarshire becoming a more established side, the competitiveness of each game drew increasingly large crowds. The proximity of the teams, in county terms, allowed large away supports to travel.

With the advent of an official County Championship in Scotland in 1902, the first league derby was watched by a then-record crowd of approximately 15,000. Forfarshire's win, with only five minutes of playing time to spare, saw their victorious batsmen carried off the field in celebration.

From this point, matches regularly drew crowds of well above 10,000. At their peak, derby attendances were recorded as being over 20,000, unrivalled by any other cricket match in Scotland.

With interest waning in Scottish cricket from the 1930s onwards, the rivalry became less prominent but remained hotly contested until the disestablishment of the Scottish County Championship in 1995.

After longstanding financial difficulties, Perthshire disbanded in 2009. As league cricket had not been played between the two teams for a decade, Perthshire's demise brought to an end nearly 120 years of competitive rivalry between the two county sides.
