= Euan McIntyre =

Scottish cricketer

Personal information
- Full name: Euan James McIntyre
- Born: 16 December 1951 (age 74); Edinburgh, Midlothian, Scotland
- Batting: Right-handed
- Bowling: Right-arm off break

Domestic team information
- Years: Team
- 1981–1988: Scotland

Career statistics
Competition	First-class	List A
Matches	2	5
Runs scored	7	12
Batting average	3.50	4.00
100s/50s	–/–	–/–
Top score	6	6
Balls bowled	78	288
Wickets	0	3
Bowling average	–	64.00
5 wickets in innings	–	–
10 wickets in match	–	–
Best bowling	–	1/23
Catches/stumpings	1/–	3/–
- Source: Cricinfo, 24 June 2022

Euan James McIntyre (born 16 December 1951) is a Scottish former cricketer and administrator.

McIntyre was born at Edinburgh in December 1951 and was educated in the city at George Heriot's School. A club cricketer for Heriot's Cricket Club, McIntyre made his debut for Scotland in first-class cricket against Ireland at Dublin in 1981. He made a second first-class appearance against Ireland in 1983 at Downpatrick. Four years after his second appearance, McIntyre made his debut in List A one-day cricket when Scotland played Kent at Myreside in the 1987 NatWest Trophy. He made a further four one-day appearances the following season, making three appearances in the Benson & Hedges Cup and one in the NatWest Trophy. He took 3 wickets in these matches, at an expensive average of exactly 64. After working in accountancy, McIntyre was appointed operations director for Cricket Scotland in 2003, a position he held until his retirement in 2013. During his tenure, he oversaw the introduction of professionalism into the Scottish cricket set-up.
