= 1904 Scottish County Championship =

- Tournament format: League system
- Champions: Perthshire (1st title)
- Participants: 4
- Matches: 12

The 1904 Scottish County Championship was the third running of organised county cricket, under the Scottish County Championship, in Scotland which ran from May to August 1904. Perthshire won their first championship.

== Overview ==
Only four teams participated in the 1904 championship, with Fifeshire having withdrawn from the competition due to fixture scheduling conflicts.

== Final table ==
One point was awarded for a win, and one point was taken away for each loss, therefore:

- 1 for a win
- 0 for a draw
- -1 for a loss

Final placings were decided by dividing the number of points earned by the number of completed matches (i.e. those that ended in a win or a loss), and multiplying by 100. Abandoned matches were counted as draws.

Team	Pld	W	T	L	D	Pts	Fin	%Fin
Perthshire	6	2	0	0	4	2	2	100.00
Forfarshire	6	2	0	1	3	1	3	33.33
Aberdeenshire	6	2	0	2	2	0	4	0.00
Stirlingshire	6	1	0	4	1	-3	5	-60.00
