= Billy McPate =

Scottish former cricketer and umpire

Personal information
- Full name: William Adamson McPate
- Born: 22 July 1951 (age 75); Baillieston, Lanarkshire, Scotland
- Batting: Right-handed
- Bowling: Right-arm fast-medium

Domestic team information
- Years: Team
- 1983–1985: Scotland

Umpiring information
- LA umpired: 2 (2010)

Career statistics
Competition	First-class	List A
Matches	3	10
Runs scored	31	35
Batting average	15.50	7.00
100s/50s	–/–	–/–
Top score	14	15
Balls bowled	324	588
Wickets	3	14
Bowling average	51.00	31.57
5 wickets in innings	–	–
10 wickets in match	–	–
Best bowling	2/70	4/42
Catches/stumpings	–/–	1/–
- Source: Cricinfo, 28 June 2022

William 'Billy' Adamson McPate (born 22 July 1951) is a Scottish former cricketer and umpire.

McPate was born in July 1951 at Baillieston, Lanarkshire. He was educated at Coatbridge High School, before matriculating to the Glasgow College of Technology. A club cricketer for Drumpellier Cricket Club, McPate made his debut for Scotland in a first-class cricket match against Ireland at Downpatrick in 1983. It was in List A one-day cricket that McPate featured more in for Scotland, making his one-day debut against Northamptonshire in the 1984 Benson & Hedges Cup. He featured in ten one-day matches for Scotland in the Benson & Hedges Cup and the NatWest Trophy. Playing as a right-arm fast-medium bowler in the Scottish side, he took 14 wickets in one-day cricket at an average of 31.57, with best figures of 4 for 42.

After McPate retired from playing, he took up umpiring with the East of Scotland Officials Association. Having officiated in the Scottish Cup Final on two occasions, McPate stood as an umpire in two List A matches in 2010 between Scotland and India A.
