= 1902 Scottish County Championship =

- Tournament format: League system
- Champions: Forfarshire (1st title)
- Participants: 5
- Matches: 20
- Most runs: Joe Anderson (333 for Perthshire)

The 1902 Scottish County Championship was the first running of organised county cricket, under the new Scottish County Championship, in Scotland which ran from 5 May to 23 August 1902. Forfarshire won the inaugural season.

== Final table ==
One point was awarded for a win, and one point was taken away for each loss, therefore:

- 1 for a win
- 0 for a draw
- -1 for a loss

Final placings were decided by dividing the number of points earned by the number of completed matches (i.e. those that ended in a win or a loss), and multiplying by 100. Abandoned matches were counted as draws.

Team	Pld	W	T	L	D	Pts	Fin	%Fin
Forfarshire	8	5	0	0	3	5	5	100
Aberdeenshire	8	3	0	1	4	2	4	50
Perthshire	8	3	0	2	3	1	5	20
Stirlingshire	8	0	0	3	5	-3	3	-100
Fifeshire	8	0	0	5	3	-5	5	-100

== Records ==
Most runs
Aggregate	Average	Player	County
333	55.5	Joe Anderson	Perthshire
315	45.0	W. R. Sharp	Forfarshire
255	36.4	W. Webster	Aberdeenshire
211	23.4	Smith	Perthshire
192	32.0	W. Stewart	Forfarshire
