= Eastern Premier League =

Cricket league in Scotland

- Countries: Scotland
- Administrator: East League Management Group
- Format: Limited overs
- First edition: 2012
- Latest edition: 2026
- Next edition: 2027
- Tournament format: Round-robin
- Number of teams: 10
- Current champion: Heriot's
- Most successful: Heriot's (5 titles)

The Eastern Premier League is the highest level of cricket for clubs in the east of Scotland. It is organised by Cricket Scotland and comprises teams from both the East of Scotland Cricket Association and the Strathmore & Perthshire Cricket Union. The reigning champions are Heriot's.

== History ==
The Eastern Premier League was formed as a part of the restructure of the nationwide Scottish National Cricket League. Watsonians were the inaugural winner of the competition in 2012. Initially comprising eight teams, the league was expanded to ten in 2014.

The competition has been played annually since its inception, with the exception of 2020 when it was cancelled due to the COVID-19 pandemic.

The 2025 season saw Heriot's crowned champions and Meigle relegated. A playoff between the winner of the SPCU North East Championship, Freuchie, and the winner of the ESCA Championship, Watsonians, saw the Edinburgh side overcome their Fife opponents and gain promotion to the Premier League.

== Format ==
Matches in this league are limited overs, with innings of 50 overs. Ten teams from across the east of Scotland play each other home and away across the season. The team with the lowest number of points is relegated to the top division in either the Strathmore & Perthshire Cricket Union (SPCU) or the East of Scotland Cricket Association (ESCA), depending on the relegated club's regional cricket association.

The league's status as the highest level of competitive cricket in Scotland, along with the Western Premiership, makes it an appealing location for both overseas players and Scottish internationals. Most teams have at least one foreign amateur and Cricket Scotland has rules to accommodate such players within the league.

The winner of the league participates in the Cricket Scotland Grand Final against the winner of the Western Premiership. Since the grand final was first contested, teams from the east have been dominant, winning all but three of the playoff matches.

== Teams ==
Of the ten teams which make up the Eastern Premier League, seven are based in Edinburgh. Heriot's have been the most successful team since the league's formation, winning five titles.

Locations of current Eastern Premier League teams
Eastern Premier League clubs in Edinburgh

Club	Ground	Location	First season in League	First title	Last title	Titles
Arbroath United	Lochlands	Arbroath	2012	2013	2013	1
Carlton	Grange Loan	Edinburgh	2012	2016	2016	1
Edinburgh South	Inch Park	Edinburgh	2025	-	-	0
Falkland	Scroggie Park	Falkland	2014	-	-	0
Forfarshire	Forthill	Dundee	2012	2019	2019	1
Grange	The Grange	Edinburgh	2012	2015	2023	3
Heriot's	Goldenacre	Edinburgh	2012	2017	2025	5
RH Corstorphine	Royal High School Cricket Ground	Edinburgh	2015	-	-	0
Stewart's Melville	Inverleith	Edinburgh	2013	-	-	0
Watsonians	Myreside Cricket Ground	Edinburgh	2012	2012	-	1

== See also ==
- Cricket in Scotland
- Strathmore & Perthshire Cricket Union
- East of Scotland Cricket Association
