= Alan Fraser (cricketer) =

Scottish cricketer

Personal information
- Full name: Alan Fraser
- Born: 13 July 1892; Perth, Perthshire, Scotland
- Died: 28 August 1962 (aged 70); Dundee, Angus, Scotland
- Batting: Right-handed
- Bowling: Unknown
- Relatives: William Lovat Fraser (brother)

Domestic team information
- Years: Team
- 1921: Scotland

Career statistics
Competition	First-class
Matches	1
Runs scored	9
Batting average	9.00
100s/50s	–/–
Top score	9
Balls bowled	42
Wickets	0
Bowling average	–
5 wickets in innings	–
10 wickets in match	–
Best bowling	–
Catches/stumpings	1/–
- Source: Cricinfo, 15 July 2022

Alan Fraser (13 July 1892 — 28 August 1962) was a Scottish first-class cricketer.

Fraser was born at Perth in July 1892. He was educated at Merchiston Castle School. He played club cricket for Perthshire until 1913, before moving to Forfarshire in 1914. He served in the British Army during the First World War with the Mechanised Transport Corps. Following the war, he resumed playing club cricket for Forfarshire and was selected to play for Scotland in a first-class cricket match against Ireland at Dublin in 1921. Batting once in the match, he was dismissed for 9 runs in the Scottish first innings by Wentworth Allen. He bowled seven wicketless overs in the Irish first innings. He was described by the Perthshire Advertiser in 1924 as a "great slip fielder". Having captained Forfarshire, he resigned the captaincy in 1927.

Fraser was president of Forfarshire Cricket Club during the Second World War and was instrumental in the continuation of cricket in the county, with matches played at Forthill. Outside of cricket, he was the managing director of Peter McIntyre Ltd., auctioneers and live stock salesmen. Fraser died at Dundee in August 1962. His brother was the cricketer and rugby union player William Lovat Fraser.
