= John Blain (cricketer) =

Scottish cricketer (born 1979)

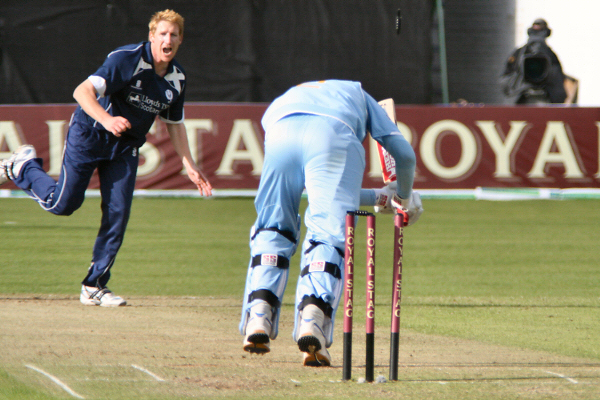

Personal information
- Full name: John Angus Rae Blain
- Born: 4 January 1979 (age 47); Edinburgh, Scotland, UK
- Height: 188 cm (6 ft 2 in)
- Batting: Right-handed
- Bowling: Right arm fast-medium
- Role: Bowler

International information
- National side: Scotland
- ODI debut (cap 3): 16 May 1999 v Australia
- Last ODI: 19 April 2009 v Afghanistan
- ODI shirt no.: 4
- T20I debut (cap 1): 12 September 2007 v Pakistan
- Last T20I: 4 August 2008 v Kenya

Domestic team information
- Years: Team
- 1997–2003: Northamptonshire
- 2004–2006: Yorkshire (squad no. 44)
- 2010: Yorkshire (squad no. 44)

Career statistics
Competition	ODI	T20I	FC	LA
Matches	33	6	42	102
Runs scored	284	4	495	635
Batting average	14.94	2.00	15.96	15.48
100s/50s	0/0	0/0	0/2	0/0
Top score	41	3*	93	41
Balls bowled	1,329	120	5,945	4,388
Wickets	41	6	120	143
Bowling average	28.60	18.00	35.55	25.72
5 wickets in innings	1	0	4	4
10 wickets in match	0	0	0	0
Best bowling	5/22	2/23	6/42	5/22
Catches/stumpings	8/–	1/–	12/–	27/–
- Source: Cricinfo, 10 June 2009

John Angus Rae Blain (born 4 January 1979) is a Scottish first-class cricketer. He is a right-handed batsman, and a right-arm fast-medium pace bowler. In May 2019, he was inducted into Cricket Scotland's Hall of Fame.

== Playing career ==
Attaining his first cap in 1996, Blain became Scotland's youngest-capped cricketer since 1890. He played during the 1996 European Championship taking seven wickets at 9.85. Blain was initially signed as a footballer to Falkirk but decided to switch to cricket, signing for Northamptonshire, having not made an impact as a footballer.

Blain left Northamptonshire County Cricket Club at the end of the 2003 season to join Yorkshire County Cricket Club, where he made sporadic appearances for the first team until he was initially released in 2006.

He played for Yorkshire League side, Rotherham Cricket Club in 2007, and was due to sign for the Scottish League side, Ferguslie, in 2008. The move fell through, and Blain played for the Scottish Saltires and Rotherham.

He appeared in all Scotland's games at the 1999 and 2007 World Cups. He finished the 1999 event with 10 wickets at 21 with a strike rate of 22.3, the best in the tournament.

In the 2010, Blain made a solitary appearance for Yorkshire in the County Championship, and in both that campaign and in 2011, Blain was the regular captain of Yorkshire's Second XI.

== Coaching career ==
Blain is an ECB Level 4 Coach. Blain was named as head coach of Grange Cricket Club. He also played as player-cum-coach with West of Scotland Cricket Club from 2010 to 2013. He was named head coach of newly formed team Eastern Knights which will play in Regional Pro Series.
