= Billy Ringrose =

Billy Ringrose may refer to:

- Billy Ringrose (cricketer) (1871–1943), English cricketer
- Billy Ringrose (equestrian) (1930–2020), Irish equestrian
