= John Russell (Scottish cricketer) =

Scottish cricketer

Personal information
- Full name: John Russell
- Born: 8 April 1887; Liff, Angus, Scotland
- Died: 20 June 1965 (aged 78); Dundee, Angus, Scotland
- Batting: Right-handed

Domestic team information
- Years: Team
- 1923: Scotland

Career statistics
Competition	First-class
Matches	1
Runs scored	58
Batting average	29.00
100s/50s	–/–
Top score	29
Catches/stumpings	1/–
- Source: Cricinfo, 3 November 2022

John Russell (8 April 1887 – 20 June 1965) was a Scottish first-class cricketer.

Russell was born in April 1887 at Liff, Angus. He was educated at the High School of Dundee. A club cricketer for both Perthshire and Forfarshire, he made a single appearance in first-class cricket for Scotland against Middlesex at Edinburgh in 1923. Described as a "hefty, broad shouldered" batsman, Russell batted twice in the match and was dismissed for 29 runs in the Scotland first innings by J. W. Hearne, while in their second innings he was dismissed for 29 runs by Archie Fowler. Outside of cricket, he was by profession a wine and spirits merchant. Russell died at Dundee in June 1965.
