= Strathmore Union =

The Strathmore Union was the main cricket league for clubs in the north and midlands of Scotland outside of the Scottish County Championship until the mid 1990s. It was one of four feeder leagues to the Scottish National Cricket League which changed to the Cricket Scotland League in 2012 and saw the Border League teams enter the East of Scotland League and the Border League becoming a 2nd XI Sunday League. The Union allowed the Perthshire League to join it in 2004, the Union's 75th anniversary. The Aberdeenshire Grades and the North of Scotland Cricket Association also run leagues in the Scotland north of Tayside.

In the late 1990s the Union had a representative team in the Regional League Championship, which pitted the best players in each league against each other. The SPCU has fielded a representative XI since the two leagues came together. Notably a select of the leagues best players played Arbroath United as part of their 125th anniversary year. Arbroath United were a founder member of the Union in 1929.

The Strathmore Union merged with the Perthshire League to form the Strathmore & Perthshire Cricket Union.
