= Robert Tait (cricketer) =

Scottish cricketer

Personal information
- Full name: Robert Garland Work Tait
- Born: 28 June 1885; Aberdeen, Aberdeenshire, Scotland
- Died: 18 August 1973 (aged 88); Dundee, Angus, Scotland
- Batting: Right-handed
- Bowling: Unknown

Domestic team information
- Years: Team
- 1907–1913: Scotland

Career statistics
Competition	First-class
Matches	13
Runs scored	590
Batting average	24.58
100s/50s	–/3
Top score	59
Balls bowled	180
Wickets	2
Bowling average	64.50
5 wickets in innings	–
10 wickets in match	–
Best bowling	1/8
Catches/stumpings	9/–
- Source: Cricinfo, 21 October 2022

Robert Garland Work Tait (28 June 1885 — 18 August 1973) was a Scottish first-class cricketer.

Tait was born at Aberdeen in June 1885 and was educated at Aberdeen Grammar School. A club cricketer for both Aberdeenshire and Forfarshire, Tait made his debut in first-class cricket for Scotland against the touring South Africans at Edinburgh in 1907. He was a regular feature in the Scottish team prior to the First World War, making thirteen first-class appearances; over half of these came against touring teams, with three matches apiece against the South Africans and the Australians, and one match against the Indians. He scored a total of 590 runs in his thirteen first-class matches at an average of 24.58, with a highest score of 59; this was one of three half centuries that he made.

Tait served in the British Army during the First World War, being commissioned as a second lieutenant in the Royal Highlanders in October 1917. He was wounded during the war, causing him to become blind in one eye. Despite this, he remained in the Royal Highlanders and was promoted to lieutenant in May 1919. His injuries eventually led to him resigning his commission in August of the same year. Following the end of his military service, Tait worked in the insurance industry. Despite his blindness in one eye, he was still able to drive a motor vehicle, and in 1925 he was convicted of speeding. His blindness in one eye ended his cricket career, both at club and international level. Tait died at Dundee in August 1973.
