= SPCU =

SPCU may refer to:

- Secretariat for Promoting Christian Unity, now the Vatican's Dicastery for Promoting Christian Unity
- Society for Promoting Catholic Unity, an organisation for Anglican Papalism
- Strathmore & Perthshire Cricket Union, Scotland
