= William Young (Scottish cricketer) =

Scottish cricketer

Personal information
- Full name: William Sturrock Young
- Born: 15 November 1896; Dundee, Angus, Scotland
- Died: 2 January 1966 (aged 69); Dundee, Angus, Scotland
- Batting: Right-handed
- Bowling: Right-arm fast-medium

Domestic team information
- Years: Team
- 1936–1938: Scotland

Career statistics
Competition	First-class
Matches	1
Runs scored	5
Batting average	5.00
100s/50s	–/–
Top score	5
Catches/stumpings	–/–
- Source: Cricinfo, 6 July 2022

William Sturrock Young (15 November 1896 – 2 January 1966) was a Scottish first-class cricketer.

Young was born at Dundee in November 1896 and was educated in the city at the Harris Academy. A club cricketer for Forfarshire Cricket Club, Young made a single appearance in first-class cricket for Scotland against Ireland at Dundee in 1924. Batting once in the match, he was dismissed for 5 runs by Wentworth Allen. Young often found himself in trouble with the law. In 1925, he was stopped by the police and asked to produce his driving licence and certificate of insurance. Having promised to do so at a later date, he subsequently forgot and was summoned to appear before Dundee Sheriff Court in July and was fined 15 shillings. In January 1935, he fatally injured a pedestrian while driving his motor vehicle in Dundee and was charged with careless driving. Four years later, he was once again charged with failing to produce his driving licence and insurance certificate to the police and was fined £1. A cabinetmaker, he was the director and secretary of John Young (Dundee), Ltd.. In June 1942, he pleaded guilty to making false statements about the sale of furniture and was fined £50. His final brush with the law came in November 1946, when a trailer belonging to his company was found to have faulty brakes. Having been found guilty, he was subsequently acquitted of any wrongdoing in January 1947. Young died at Dundee in January 1966.
