= George Chalmers (cricketer) =

Scottish cricketer

Personal information
- Full name: George Keay Chalmers
- Born: 13 June 1881; Dundee, Angus, Scotland
- Died: 5 January 1946 (aged 64); Carnoustie, Angus, Scotland
- Batting: Right-handed
- Role: Wicket-keeper

Domestic team information
- Years: Team
- 1908–1920: Scotland

Career statistics
Competition	First-class
Matches	7
Runs scored	118
Batting average	16.85
100s/50s	–/–
Top score	40*
Catches/stumpings	7/7
- Source: Cricinfo, 19 July 2022

George Keay Chalmers (13 June 1881 — 5 January 1946) was a Scottish first-class cricketer.

Chalmers was born in June 1881 at Dundee, where he was educated at the High School of Dundee. A club cricketer for Forfarshire Cricket Club, Chalmers made his debut for Scotland against Nottinghamshire at Edinburgh in June 1908. The following year he appeared against the touring Australians, before making two appearances against Ireland in 1910 and 1911. He made two further appearances before the First World War, against the touring Australians and South Africans in 1912. Following the war, he made a final against Ireland in 1920. A wicket-keeper, he took seven catches and stumpings apiece in his seven first-class matches. As a batsman, he scored 118 runs at an average of 16.85 and made a highest score of 40 not out. Besides playing cricket, Chalmers was also a prominent golfer in the Midland region of Scotland. Outside of sport, he was a boot and shoe retailer with a shop in Dundee High Street. Chalmers died at Carnoustie in January 1946.
