= Kelby Pickering =

Australian cricketer (born 1976)

Personal information
- Full name: Kelby Sinclair Pickering
- Born: 3 January 1976 (age 50); Lameroo, Australia
- Batting: Right-handed
- Bowling: Right-arm fast-medium

Domestic team information
- Years: Team
- 1997/98: South Australia
- Source: Cricinfo, 18 September 2020

Kelby Sinclair Pickering (born 3 January 1976) is an Australian cricketer. He played in one first-class and three List A matches for South Australia in 1997/98. After his career in Australia, Pickering played cricket in Liverpool, England during the late 1990s and early 2000s, and for Forfarshire in Dundee, Scotland in 2010.

== See also ==
- List of South Australian representative cricketers
