= Peter Pullan =

English cricketer

Peter Pullan (29 March 1857 – 3 March 1901) was an English first-class cricketer, who played one match for Yorkshire County Cricket Club in 1884. He scored fourteen runs in his only first-class innings at an average of 14.00, plus he bowled eight balls for five runs without taking a wicket, and took one catch.

Born in Guiseley, Leeds, Yorkshire, England, Pullan had a right hand batting style and was a right arm slow bowler. In addition to his brief first-class duties with Yorkshire, Pullan played for Littleborough C.C. in 1896 and 1897, and held professional posts at Forfarshire C.C. (1881), Guiseley C.C. (1882), Haslingden C.C. (1883, 1884 and 1886), Bradford C.C. (1885), Raistrick C.C. (1887) and Golcar C.C. (1888 to 1895). He also played for Huddersfield C.C. for several years.

Pullan died on 3 March 1901, aged 43, in Menston, Yorkshire.
