= Alexander Simpson (cricketer) =

Scottish cricketer

Personal information
- Full name: Alexander Russell Simpson
- Born: 28 February 1905; Dunfermline, Fife, Scotland
- Died: 10 November 1975 (aged 70); Weston-super-Mare, Somerset, England
- Batting: Right-handed
- Role: Wicket-keeper

Domestic team information
- Years: Team
- 1924–1934: Scotland

Career statistics
Competition	First-class
Matches	12
Runs scored	101
Batting average	6.31
100s/50s	0/0
Top score	19*
Catches/stumpings	14/10
- Source: Cricinfo, 30 October 2022

Alexander Russell Simpson (28 February 1905 – 10 November 1975) was a Scottish first-class cricketer and schoolmaster.

Simpson was born at Dunfermline in February 1905 and was educated at Dunfermline High School. A wicket-keeper, he played club cricket for Dunfermline and Forfarshire, and made his debut for Scotland in first-class cricket against the touring South Africans at Glasgow in 1924. He played first-class cricket for Scotland until 1934, making twelve appearances.

Simpson took 14 catches and made 10 stumpings in first-class cricket, and scored 101 runs at an average of 6.31. In his report on Scotland's match against the touring New Zealanders in 1931, the New Zealand cricket historian Tom Reese said Simpson's wicket-keeping was superior to any English player's.

Outside of cricket, Simpson was a schoolmaster. He died in England at Weston-super-Mare in November 1975.
