= Alexander Lindsay (cricketer) =

Scottish cricketer

Alec Lindsay
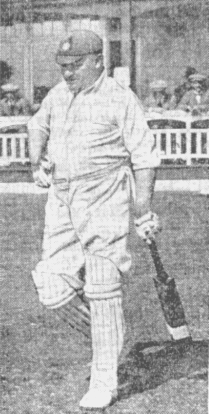
- Lindsay in 1921

Personal information
- Full name: Alexander Lindsay
- Born: 13 February 1883; Broughty Ferry, Angus, Scotland
- Died: 26 January 1941 (aged 57); Dundee, Angus, Scotland
- Batting: Right-handed
- Bowling: Leg break googly

Domestic team information
- Years: Team
- 1909: Scotland

Career statistics
Competition	First-class
Matches	1
Runs scored	7
Batting average	3.50
100s/50s	–/–
Top score	7
Balls bowled	12
Wickets	0
Bowling average	–
5 wickets in innings	–
10 wickets in match	–
Best bowling	–
Catches/stumpings	1/–
- Source: Cricinfo, 22 July 2022

Alexander Lindsay (13 February 1883 — 26 January 1941) was a Scottish first-class cricketer and merchant.

Lindsay was born in February 1883 at Broughty Ferry. He was educated at Fettes College. A club cricketer for Forfarshire, where he was the matchday captain for several years, he made a single appearance in first-class cricket for Scotland against the touring Australians at Edinburgh in 1909. Batting twice in the match, he was dismissed for 7 runs in the Scottish first innings by Jack O'Connor, while in their second innings he was dismissed without scoring by Bill Whitty.

He also bowled two overs of leg break googly bowling, going wicketless. Lindsay later captained Forfarshire to the Scottish Counties Championship in 1920. Outside of cricket, he was a merchant and was a director of Lindsay and Low, Ltd, a confectionery and preserves manufacturer. Lindsay died at a nursing home in Dundee in January 1941.
