= The Dyvours Club =

Coordinates: 55.95983°N 3.21337°W

The Dyvours Club, these days known as The Grange Dyvours Club, is the oldest lawn tennis club in Edinburgh, Scotland. The club has four grass tennis courts, four flood-lit all-weather courts, and two indoor hard courts, in the Stockbridge district of Edinburgh.

== History ==
The club was founded in 1883. The origin of the club name comes from the 17th Century, when bankrupts in Scotland - known in Scots as 'Dyvours' - were condemned to advertise their plight by wearing clothes of various colours, particularly brown and yellow which were known as 'dyvours' hose. As the club founders had no grounds of their own they co-opted the 'Dyvours' name and colours to represent the fact that in the words of the clubs first chairman Lord Dunedin "they intended to play on other people's grounds and eat other people's lunches".

The club eventually began playing on ground next to The Grange Club in Stockbridge, the home of Scottish cricket. Initially this was Real tennis played in a hut called the 'Tin Temple'. Sir James Patten McDougall KCB was one of the first to play Lawn tennis outdoors at The Grange Club ground, and over time a sub-section of The Dyvours Club began to play outside in the summer months. For ten years, the club enjoyed the use of ten grass courts until two were requisitioned by The Grange Club for the construction of their cricket pavilion, opened in 1895 Two more courts were lost with the construction of squash courts in 1974. Eventually the club became a fully lawn tennis club in 1902.

In 1996, the name of the club was changed to Grange Dyvours Lawn Tennis Club to reflect the long standing association with The Grange Club.

== Facilities ==
The club has four grass tennis courts. Since 1994 the club has also had four floodlit, all-weather courts.

Proposals were drawn together in 2016 to construct a new indoor tennis facility for the club called 'The Tin Temple Two' on the clubs site next to The Grange Club Pavilion.

== Competitions ==
The club was home of the Scottish Lawn Tennis Championship from its founding in 1878 to 1892. It would return for one year in 1994.

The club plays in the East of Scotland leagues.

== See also ==
- Tennis in Scotland
- Falkland Palace Royal Tennis Club
