= David Stevenson (cricketer) =

Scottish cricketer and administrator

Personal information
- Full name: David Craig Stevenson
- Born: 3 May 1890; Kilmarnock, Ayrshire, Scotland
- Died: 21 March 1977 (aged 86); Dundee, Angus, Scotland
- Batting: Left-handed
- Bowling: Slow left-arm orthodox

Domestic team information
- Years: Team
- 1922–1925: Scotland
- 1932: Northumberland

Career statistics
Competition	First-class
Matches	6
Runs scored	96
Batting average	8.72
100s/50s	–/–
Top score	35
Balls bowled	246
Wickets	4
Bowling average	20.25
5 wickets in innings	–
10 wickets in match	–
Best bowling	2/29
Catches/stumpings	1/–
- Source: Cricinfo, 18 June 2019

David Craig Stevenson (3 May 1890 – 21 March 1977) was a Scottish first-class cricketer and administrator.

Stevenson was born at Kilmarnock in May 1890. He worked for the Inland Revenue as an inspector of taxes. He made his debut in first-class cricket for Scotland against the Marylebone Cricket Club at Lord's in 1922. He played first-class cricket for Scotland until 1925, making six appearances. He scored 96 runs across his six matches, at an average of 8.72, with a high score of 35. With his slow left-arm orthodox bowling, he took 4 wickets with best figures of 2 for 29. He later played minor counties cricket for Northumberland, making a single appearance against Durham in the 1932 Minor Counties Championship. He served as president of the Scottish Cricket Union in 1954. He died at Dundee in March 1977.
