= Scottish National Cricket League =

- Countries: Scotland
- Administrator: Cricket Scotland
- Headquarters: Edinburgh, Scotland
- Format: Limited overs
- First edition: 1996
- Latest edition: 2011
- Tournament format: Two divisions
- Most successful: Grange (8 titles)

The Scottish National Cricket League (SNCL) was the main domestic cricket competition in Scotland between 1996 and 2011.

Formed as the Scottish Cricket League after the merger of the Scottish County Championship and several district leagues in Scotland, it was expanded in 1998 to three divisions. The North of Scotland Cricket Association (NoSCA) and Aberdeenshire Grades leagues stayed separate.

In its last season in 2011, 32 cricket clubs competed, divided across two divisions: the Premiership; and the Championship.

The league was disbanded in 2012 and replaced by the regionalised Eastern Premier Division and Western Premier Division. The national champion is determined with a 'Grand Final' playoff match.

== See also ==
- Cricket in Scotland
