= Peter Rhind =

Scottish cricketer

Personal information
- Full name: Peter Alan Rhind
- Born: 20 June 1945 (age 81); Dundee, Angus, Scotland
- Batting: Right-handed
- Bowling: Right-arm fast-medium

Domestic team information
- Years: Team
- 1968–1982: Scotland

Career statistics
Competition	First-class
Matches	6
Runs scored	23
Batting average	7.66
100s/50s	–/–
Top score	10
Balls bowled	651
Wickets	6
Bowling average	55.33
5 wickets in innings	–
10 wickets in match	–
Best bowling	3/62
Catches/stumpings	3/–
- Source: Cricinfo, 30 October 2022

Peter Alan Rhind (born 20 June 1945) is a Scottish former first-class cricketer.

Rhind was born at Dundee in June 1945 and was educated in the city at the Morgan Academy. A club cricketer for both Forfarshire and Heriot's Former Pupils, winning the Scottish Cup with the latter in 1978. He made his debut for Scotland in first-class cricket against Warwickshire at Edgbaston during Scotland's 1968 tour of England. He played first-class cricket intermittently for Ireland until 1982, making five additional appearances; four of these came against Ireland, with one coming against the touring New Zealanders. Playing in the Scottish side as a right-arm fast-medium bowler, he took 6 wickets at an average of 55.33, with best figures of 3 for 62. As a lower order batsman, he scored 23 runs with a highest score of 10.
