= W. R. Sharp =

Scottish cricketer

Personal information
- Full name: William Ritchie Sharp
- Born: 13 January 1861; Dundee, Forfarshire, Scotland
- Died: 10 September 1925 (aged 64); Edzell, Forfarshire, Scotland
- Batting: Right-handed
- Bowling: Unknown
- Role: All-rounder

Domestic team information
- Years: Team
- 1902-1904: Scotland

Career statistics
Competition	First-class
Matches	4
Runs scored	118
Batting average	23.6
100s/50s	–/–
Top score	32
Balls bowled	–
Wickets	–
Bowling average	–
5 wickets in innings	–
10 wickets in match	–
Best bowling	–
Catches/stumpings	1/–
- Source: CricketArchive (subscription), 24 January 2026

William Ritchie Sharp was a Scottish first-class cricketer and jute merchant who was club captain of Forfarshire for 40 years.

Noted for his batting partnership with veteran club professional Pat Higgins for much of Scottish cricket's golden age at the turn of the century, he was central to the development of the club both on and off the field.

== Early life ==
Sharp was the son of one the wealthiest and most influential jute barons in Dundee, John Sharp. Educated at Clifton College between 1875 and 1879, Sharp returned to Dundee and followed his father into the jute industry.

== Cricket career ==
Having played for Forfarshire since 1881, Sharp became club captain in 1895.

With the arrival of Pat Higgins as professional in 1883, the two players formed a formidable batting partnership which lasted for 25 consecutive years at the club.

In 1898, Sharp funded the construction of a new pavilion at the club's ground, Forthill. On the day of the official opening of the pavilion, he recorded the highest score of his career, 193 runs against Edinburgh Academicals.

Playing for Scotland four times, he earned his first cap against Australia in 1902. In 1904 he was again involved against a national side, this time against South Africa, scoring 48 runs over two innings.

== Later life ==
In 1923, from the wealth he accumulated as a merchant, Sharp was able to buy Forthill cricket ground, following the death of the landowner who had been leasing it to Forfarshire. He subsequently donated the ground to the club.

On 10 September 1925, Sharp suffered a heart attack while out walking alone near Edzell, where he had been on holiday. He was found shortly afterwards, collapsed on a bench at the side of a road, and died before a doctor could arrive. He was unmarried and had made no will. Sharp's estate was valued at £423,165 (equivalent to £22,243,083 in 2025).

Club captain of Forfarshire until his death, Sharp's association with the club lasted a total of 44 years. His death occurred less than three months before that of Pat Higgins, who also died suddenly of a heart attack.

The year after his death, in 1926, a new stone gateway dedicated to Sharp was erected at Forthill.
