= Stewart Bruce (cricketer) =

Scottish cricketer

Personal information
- Full name: Stewart Bruce
- Born: 2 April 1969 (age 57); Edinburgh, Midlothian, Scotland
- Batting: Left-handed
- Bowling: Left-arm fast-medium

Domestic team information
- Years: Team
- 2004: Scotland
- 2002: Huntingdonshire

Career statistics
Competition	List A
Matches	2
Runs scored	–
Batting average	–
100s/50s	–/–
Top score	–
Balls bowled	18
Wickets	2
Bowling average	14.00
5 wickets in innings	–
10 wickets in match	–
Best bowling	2/28
Catches/stumpings	–/–
- Source: Cricinfo, 21 November 2011

Stewart Bruce (born 2 April 1969) is a former Scottish cricketer. Bruce was a left-handed batsman who bowled left-arm fast-medium. He was born at Edinburgh, Midlothian.

Bruce played two matches for Huntingdonshire in the 2002 MCCA Knockout Trophy against Lincolnshire and the Leicestershire Cricket Board. He later made two List A appearances for Scotland in the 2004 totesport League against Worcestershire and Sussex. In the match against Worcestershire he took the wickets of Vikram Solanki and Gareth Batty, finishing with figures of 2/28 from three overs. He wasn't required to bat in this match, with Worcestershire winning by 9 runs. The match against Scotland ended in no result, with Bruce not required to bat or bowl. In 2004, Bruce also played for a Scotland XI in the European Cricket Championship Division One.
