= Murgitroyd =

- Headquarters: Glasgow
- No. of offices: 19
- Major practice areas: Intellectual Property
- Key people: Gordon Stark; (Chief Executive Officer); Camilla Jagger; (Chief Operating Officer); Thomas Gibb; (Chief Compliance Officer); John Gillies; (Chief People Officer); David Goldsby; (Chief Technology Officer); Russell Flanders; (Chief Commercial Officer); Simon Belfer; (Chief Financial Officer); Joanne Lecky; (Managing Director, Trade Marks); Barry Moore; (Managing Director, Patents)
- Date founded: 1975
- Company type: Private limited company
- Website: murgitroyd.com

Murgitroyd is an international practice of intellectual property attorneys, headquartered in Glasgow, which specialises in patents, trade marks, designs and related intellectual property matters. The practice was established in 1975 and operates across offices in the United Kingdom and continental Europe, the United States, China and Nicaragua. The firm states that it represents clients before the European Patent Office, the European Intellectual Property Office and a number of national intellectual property offices in Europe.

== History ==
Murgitroyd was founded as a sole practitioner practice in Glasgow, Scotland by Ian Murgitroyd in 1975. The practice became a partnership in 1977 and was incorporated in 1993. It is currently a standalone private limited company ultimately owned by Sovereign Capital. Prior to its acquisition by Sovereign Capital in 2019, the Murgitroyd group was listed on the Alternative Investment Market of the London Stock Exchange, having floated in 2001.

== Acquisitions and expansion ==
Murgitroyd has expanded through the acquisition of a number of practices since the turn of the century. These have included Cabinet Bonneau based in Nice, France (2003), Castles in London, England (2005), Fitzpatricks in Glasgow (2006), Kennedys based in Glasgow and Newcastle upon Tyne (2008), Raworth Moss & Cook in London (2009), Patentanwalt Liu in Munich (2013), Patentvest in Managua (2016), Chapman IP in Southampton (2019), Hanna Moore + Curley in Dublin and Dalian, China (2021), UDL Intellectual Property in Leeds, Cardiff, London, Milton Keynes, and Newcastle (2021), Creation IP in Glasgow (2022), and TLIP, in Leeds and Cambridge (2022).

== Geographical footprint and jurisdictional coverage ==
Murgitroyd has 21 offices in Europe — in the United Kingdom, Finland, Germany, Ireland, Italy and Switzerland. On its jurisdictions page, the firm lists European offices in Aberdeen, Belfast, Cardiff, Dublin, Geneva, Glasgow (headquarters), Helsinki, Leeds, London Croydon, London Central, Milan, Milton Keynes, Munich, Newcastle upon Tyne, and Southampton.

The firm also states it can represent clients directly before national patent and trade mark offices of Austria, Belgium, Denmark, the Faroe Islands, Greenland, Luxembourg, Monaco, The Netherlands, Norway and Sweden, in addition to the European Patent Office, European Intellectual Property Office and the Unified Patent Court.

Furthermore, the practice also has two client liaison offices in the United States of America - Durham, North Carolina and Santa Clara, California, an office in Dalian, China, and a further office in Managua, Nicaragua specialising in patent searching, technical illustration and docketing.

== Practice areas and sectors ==
Murgitroyd describes itself as a full-service intellectual property firm, with services including patents, trade marks and brand protection, design protection, copyright, domain names, due diligence, IP audits, IP strategy and portfolio management, opposition and appeal work, litigation support and trade secrets.

The firm's website organises its work by sector. These include automotive, engineering and energy; brands, services and retail; chemistry and materials; life sciences and healthcare; and technology, media and telecommunications. Published sector pages identify subject areas including advanced materials, battery technology, food technology, green chemistry, polymers, biology, CRISPR, medical devices, pharmaceuticals, artificial intelligence, blockchain, communication technologies, electronics and software.

== Technology and responsible AI ==
In March 2026, Murgitroyd announced a Responsible AI Framework for its use of artificial intelligence in intellectual property services. The firm's announcement described the framework as part of a broader internal AI governance programme, and a separate AI Usage Policy sets out principles including professional excellence, client confidentiality and ethical responsibility.

== Recognition ==
Murgitroyd was awarded the highest ranking across all sector categories in the Financial Times 2025 Survey of Europe's Leading Patent Law Firms. The firm is also regularly recognised in industry-leading rankings, including Managing Intellectual Property's IPStars, The Legal 500 (UK) directory, IAM Patent 1000, IAM Strategy 300, WTR 1000, and WIPR Leaders. The firm also received recognition in the China IP Awards with the Outstanding International IP Service Teams Award.

In 2025, Murgitroyd was recognised among the UK's best privately managed companies, an accolade that acknowledges leading private companies for their organisational excellence and contributions to their industries. In 2024, the firm won the Vision 2024 Leaders Driving Growth award at the BVCA Awards.
