= Earl Reoch =

Scottish cricketer and solicitor

Personal information
- Full name: Earle Clark Reoch
- Born: 5 March 1942; Monifieth, Angus, Scotland
- Died: 1 December 1989 (aged 47); Dundee, Angus, Scotland
- Batting: Right-handed
- Bowling: Slow left-arm orthodox

Domestic team information
- Years: Team
- 1973: Scotland

Career statistics
Competition	First-class
Matches	1
Runs scored	7
Batting average	3.50
100s/50s	–/–
Top score	7
Catches/stumpings	1/–
- Source: Cricinfo, 28 October 2022

Earle Clark Reoch (5 March 1942 – 1 December 1989) was a Scottish first-class cricketer and solicitor.

Reoch was born at Monifieth in March 1942. He was educated at the High School of Dundee, before matriculating to the University of St Andrews. Reoch played club cricket for both Forfarshire and Perthshire, with him captaining Forfarshire in 1968, 1971 and 1976. He made a single appearance in first-class cricket for Scotland against Ireland at Cork in 1973. Batting twice in the match, he was dismissed in Scotland's first innings without scoring by Gerry Duffy, while in their second innings he was dismissed for 3 runs by Dermott Monteith. In the same year he also played in matches against Essex and the touring New Zealanders, though neither match carried first-class status. Outside of cricket, he was a solicitor by profession. Reoch suffered a heart attack at his Broughty Ferry home on 30 November 1989 and died the following day at Ninewells Hospital in Dundee.
