= Cricket in Scotland =

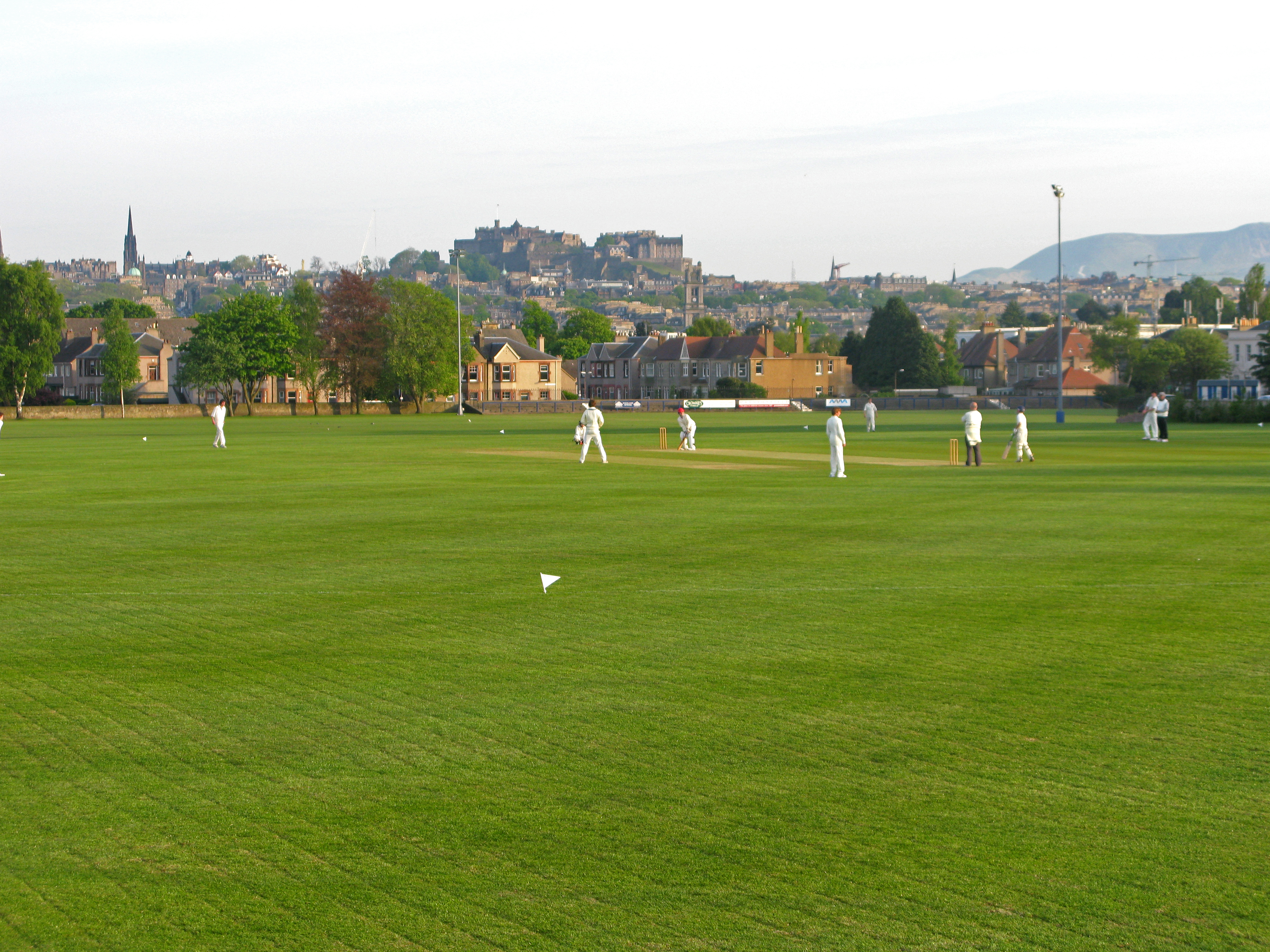
- Cricket at Goldenacre in Edinburgh, with Edinburgh Castle as a backdrop
- Country: Scotland
- Governing body: Cricket Scotland
- National team: Scotland

National competitions
- List A Cricket; Cricket Scotland Grand Final; Scottish Cup; T20 Cricket; T20 Scottish Cup

Club competitions
- List A Cricket; Eastern Premier League; T20 Cricket; European T20 Premier League

International competitions
- Cricket World Cup; ICC World Twenty20; ICC Champions Trophy; Women's Cricket World Cup; Under-19 Cricket World Cup

Cricket has a considerably lower profile in Scotland than it has in neighbouring England. Scotland is not one of the twelve leading cricketing nations which play Test matches, but the Scottish national team is now allowed to play full One Day Internationals even outside the Cricket World Cup, in which Scotland competed in 1999, 2007, and 2015. Scotland has a well established recreational cricket structure. In 2016 it was estimated that around 17,000 people play cricket in Scotland. At international level, Scotland is ranked as one of the highest 'associate' (non-Test) teams, and has historic rivalries both with its neighbouring full members England and Ireland, and fellow high ranked associate, the Netherlands.

== History ==
Cricket in Scotland is at least 225 years old. The first match for which records are available was played in September 1785 at Schaw Park, Alloa. The game was more generally introduced to Scotland by English soldiers garrisoned in the country in the years following the Jacobite rising led by Bonnie Prince Charlie in 1745; and it is no coincidence that the oldest known club is Kelso (records date back to 1820), in the Borders, then a garrison town. The origins of cricket in Perth, where cricket was also played at a very early stage, was also for the same reason.

In other areas, including the Borders of Scotland, the game seems to have been introduced by immigrant English workers in the paper, textile and iron industries, while in Edinburgh the game was taken up in the mid nineteenth century by the main Schools in the area, most prominently initially by the Royal High School and Edinburgh Academy.

The first representative game of any standing was in 1849, when the All England XI came to Edinburgh to play a 22-man team representing Scotland. This match provoked great interest and similar visits followed over the next few years, representative games also being played in other cities and towns. Scotland matches played on an eleven a side basis date from 1865, against a total of more than 30 countries, including all the Test-playing nations, and numerous other select teams, including, of course, the MCC. But the development of Scotland's international standing was more-or-less ignored for the best part of the 20th century, with three-day matches against Ireland, MCC, touring Test teams and the occasional County side being the only ones granted 'first-class' status.

In 1980, Scotland was invited to take part in England's Benson and Hedges Cup and NatWest Trophy one-day competitions. In a further development, Scotland resigned from membership of the UK Cricket Council in 1992, effectively severing links with England in the cricketing sense, and in 1994 was elected to Associate Membership of the International Cricket Council (ICC). This gave Scotland its own voice in world cricket and the national team took part for the first time in the ICC Trophy held in Kuala Lumpur in March/April 1997. Third place qualified Scotland for the ICC World Cup in 1999 hosted by England, and Scotland themselves hosted two games (against New Zealand & Bangladesh) at The Grange Club in Edinburgh.

Although failing to qualify for the 2003 World Cup, Scotland made significant inroads in professionalising the game in Scotland. The first part of this was Scotland's acceptance into the English Sunday League competition in 2003, for a period of three years. This involved playing a minimum of 18 matches of top class cricket against the English counties, giving both players and administrators the level of experience necessary for Scotland's progress to One-Day International status.

In a halcyon period for the Scotland International side, they won the inaugural (three-day) ICC Intercontinental Cup in November 2004, and then the 2005 ICC Trophy in Dublin by beating old rivals Ireland, putting the Scots into 12th place in the global rankings. This gave Scotland qualification for the 2007 World Cup in the West Indies. Placed in the hardest Group, no successes were achieved in the Tournament and there was further disappointment at not achieving qualification for the 2011 World Cup.

The International teams then entered a transitional phase, with the retiral of several key players from the previous few years. It was 2011 before Scotland emerged with a fully competitive team, most notably winning four consecutive One Day Internationals against Afghanistan, Netherlands (twice) and Ireland. Following defeat by Sri Lanka, they continued a successful path by beating Northamptonshire and Warwickshire on consecutive days in the CB40 Competition.

== Administration ==
The governing body for Scottish cricket is Cricket Scotland, which administers women's cricket and junior cricket as well as the men's game.

The then Scottish Cricket Union resigned from the UK Cricket Council in 1992, effectively severing links with the organisation of cricket in England and Wales. In 1994 Scotland became an Associate Member of the International Cricket Council.

== Men's national team ==
The Scottish men's team competed in the Cricket World Cup in 1999. It lost all five of its matches and was eliminated in the preliminary round. Scotland failed to qualify for the 2003 World Cup but qualified for the 2007 event in the West Indies. Scotland won the qualifying tournament, the ICC Trophy, in Ireland in 2005. Scotland played Australia, South Africa and the Netherlands in the opening group stage in 2007. Most of the members of Scotland's national team are amateurs, although a few Scots have played professionally in English domestic cricket, and for the England national team, including former captain Mike Denness.

In 2003, the Scottish team was granted a place in the English national one day cricket league in the hope that playing against professional cricketers on a regular basis would improve the performance level of the best Scottish cricketers.

The Scottish national team qualified for the 2007 2009, 2016, 2021 and 2022 T20 World Cup tournaments, qualifying for the main round for the first time at the 2021 Tournament.

They have also qualified for the upcoming edition of the T20 World Cup which will be hosted by West Indies and United States in June 2024.

== Domestic cricket ==
=== Amateur cricket leagues ===
Scotland has amateur cricket leagues held throughout the country which are run by five associations:

- The East of Scotland Cricket Association - 9 leagues, 81 teams & a Sunday Development League
- The Western District Cricket Union - 6 leagues, 57 teams & 2 Sunday Leagues, 13 teams
- The Strathmore & Perthshire Cricket Union - 3 leagues, 28 teams & a Sunday Recreation & Development League
- The North East Scotland Cricket SCIO - 3 "grades", 29 teams
- The North of Scotland Cricket Association - 7 team Senior League & 9 team Development League

In addition to leagues run by the 5 associations, there is also the Eastern Premier League, which is a combined top level 10 team league for sides from East of Scotland Cricket Association and the Strathmore & Perthshire Cricket Union.

=== The Regional Series ===
The Regional Pro Series was first launched in 2016 replacing the North Sea Pro Series a competition which was a joint venture between the Royal Dutch Cricket Board and Cricket Scotland. It is Scotland's premier domestic competition. The tournament consists of three teams; Western Warriors, Eastern Knights and Caledonian Highlanders. Each team is based in a different region of Scotland.

== Twenty20 cricket ==
The first season of the European T20 Premier League, a Twenty20 franchise-based tournament, is scheduled to be start in 2026.

== Notable Scottish cricketers ==
One of the most notable cricketers in history was a Scot, born in India of Scottish parents, Douglas Jardine, the inventor of "Leg Theory". Jardine was born in British India, brought up in St Andrews, spent most of his life in England, died in Switzerland and his ashes were scattered in Perthshire. He gave his own children Scottish names.

A number of other prominent cricketers have come from Scotland, including the former England captain,Mike Denness, Warwickshire all-rounder Dougie Brown, and former England test players Gavin Hamilton and Gregor MacGregor, who represented Scotland at rugby as well as England at cricket.

Another notable Scottish cricketer was Brian Hardie, who was a major contributor to the successful Essex side of the 70's and 80's. One of the most successful Scottish spinners, and a respected journalist, was Ian Peebles, who was one of the cricketers of the year in 1931 alongside Donald Bradman.

R. C. Robertson-Glasgow played for Oxford University and Somerset and later became a prominent cricket writer and correspondent. The South African-born former England captain Tony Greig also qualified to play for England due to his Scottish parentage.

Finally Scots have also played for other countries: Tom Campbell for South Africa and Archie Jackson for Australia.
