= Alexander Steele =

Scottish cricketer and architect

Alexander Steele MBE
Personal information
- Full name: Alexander Steele
- Born: 25 February 1941 (age 85); Salisbury, Southern Rhodesia
- Batting: Right-handed
- Role: Wicket-keeper

Domestic team information
- Years: Team
- 1967–1980: Scotland

Career statistics
Competition	First-class
Matches	14
Runs scored	621
Batting average	24.84
100s/50s	0/2
Top score	97
Catches/stumpings	11/2
- Source: Cricinfo, 6 July 2022

Alexander Steele MBE (born 25 February 1941) is a Rhodesian-born Scottish former cricketer and architect.

Steele was born at Salisbury in Southern Rhodesia in February 1941. He was initially educated at Prince Edward School in Salisbury, before moving to Scotland, where he studied in Dundee at the Morgan Academy. He studied architecture at the Dundee College of Art and was admitted to the Royal Institute of British Architects (RIBA) in 1966, joining the architecture firm Baxter, Clark & Paul immediately after finishing at the college and became a partner in the firm in 1975. Steele designed many buildings across Scotland, and in the 1980s led the section of the firm's Dundee office which was responsible for hospital architecture and work alongside the Department of the Environment. His association with RIBA saw him serve as an examiner. His career in architecture lasted until the 1990s, when ill health necessitated his retirement.

A club cricketer for Forfarshire, Steele made his debut for Scotland in first-class cricket against Lancashire at Old Trafford on Scotland's tour of England in 1967. He was a regular member of the Scottish side in first-class cricket in the late 1960s, making eight appearances to 1969. An eight-year gap before his next appearance Ireland in 1977 followed, with Steele making a further five first-class appearances to 1980. Playing in the Scottish side as a wicket-keeper batsman, Steele scored 621 runs in his fourteen first-class appearances at an average of 24.84; he scored two half centuries, all against Ireland, with a highest score of 97 in 1968. As a wicket-keeper, he took 11 catches and made two stumpings.
