= Regional Pro Series =

Former Scottish domestic professional cricket competition

- Countries: Scotland
- Administrator: Cricket Scotland
- Headquarters: Edinburgh, Scotland
- Format: Limited overs (List A & Twenty20)
- Tournament format: Double round-robin followed by playoffs
- Current champion: Western Warriors (1st title)
- Most successful: Eastern Knights (4 Pro50 titles, 3 T20 titles)

The Regional Pro Series (also known as the Tilney Regional Series for sponsorship reasons) was the premier professional domestic cricket competition in Scotland from 2016 to 2021. Organised by Cricket Scotland, it featured three regional teams in limited-overs formats to develop talent and support the national team's pathway to international success.

The series comprised the Pro50 tournament (50-over matches) and the T20 Blitz (20-over matches). It replaced the earlier North Sea Pro Series and aligned with ambitions to achieve ICC Full Membership by providing high-performance opportunities for contracted players and emerging talents. Following the 2021 season, the formalized league was discontinued as Scotland transitioned to a new "Performance Pathway" model.

== History ==
The series debuted in 2016 with the Eastern Knights, Western Warriors, and Caledonian Highlanders. Tilney Ltd became the title sponsor in 2018, enabling expanded pathway programs and professionalized media coverage.

The 2020 season was cancelled due to the COVID-19 pandemic. The series resumed in 2021 with the addition of a fourth team, the Cricket Scotland Performance Academy, to bridge youth development with professional play.

=== Discontinuation (2022–present) ===
Following the 2021 final, the competition was not held as a formalized league. In 2023, Cricket Scotland officially launched a restructured "Performance Pathway", which moved away from a regional-league table toward a representative model centered on regional U15, U17, and Scotland U19 team fixtures and national development squads.

== Participating teams ==
- Eastern Knights: Representing the east (Edinburgh/Lothians). Ground: The Grange Club.
- Western Warriors: Representing the west (Glasgow/Ayrshire). Ground: Titwood.
- Caledonian Highlanders: Representing the north (Dundee/Aberdeen). Ground: Forthill.

== Winners ==
=== Pro50 Series (50-over) ===
Year	Winner	Runner-up
2016	Eastern Knights	Caledonian Highlanders
2017	Eastern Knights	Western Warriors
2018	Eastern Knights	Caledonian Highlanders
2019	Eastern Knights	Caledonian Highlanders
2020	Cancelled (COVID-19 pandemic)	
2021	Western Warriors	Eastern Knights

=== T20 Series (Regional T20 Blitz) ===
Year	Winner	Runner-up
2016	Eastern Knights	Caledonian Highlanders
2017	Western Warriors	Eastern Knights
2018	Eastern Knights	Western Warriors
2019	Eastern Knights	Western Warriors
2020	Cancelled (COVID-19 pandemic)	
2021	No competition held	

== Records ==
- Most Successful Team: Eastern Knights (7 titles total).
- Highest Score: Oli Hairs (Eastern Knights), 102 off 44 balls vs Western Warriors, June 2021.

== See also ==
- Cricket Scotland
- Eastern Premier League
