= Bill Etherington (cricketer) =

English cricketer

Maurice William Etherington (24 August 1916 – November 1986) was an English cricketer active from 1946 to 1948 who played for Middlesex and Leicestershire. He was born and died in Hammersmith. He appeared in five first-class matches as a righthanded batsman who bowled right arm fast. He scored 64 runs with a highest score of 27 and took eight wickets with a best performance of three for 23.
