= Billy Ringrose (cricketer) =

English cricketer

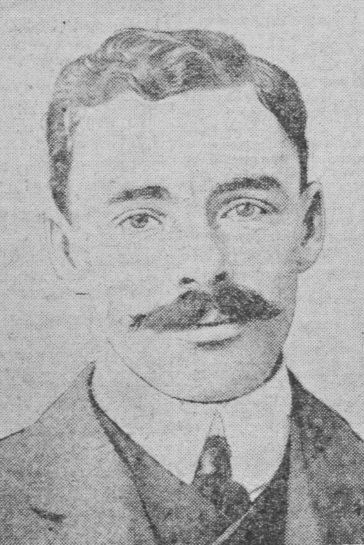
- Ringrose in 1907

Personal information
- Full name: William Ringrose
- Born: 2 September 1871; Ganton, Yorkshire, England
- Died: 14 September 1943 (aged 72); Cross Gates, Yorkshire, England
- Batting: Left-handed
- Bowling: Right-arm fast-medium
- Role: Bowler

Domestic team information
- Years: Team
- 1901–1906: Yorkshire

Career statistics
Competition	First-class
Matches	61
Runs scored	377
Batting average	5.98
100s/50s	–/–
Top score	23
Balls bowled	7,387
Wickets	175
Bowling average	20.38
5 wickets in innings	11
10 wickets in match	2
Best bowling	9/76
Catches/stumpings	27/-
- Source: Cricinfo profile

William Ringrose (2 September 1871 – 14 September 1943) was an English first-class cricketer, who played fifty seven games for Yorkshire County Cricket Club between 1901 and 1906, and was a professional at Forfarshire Cricket Club between 1907 and 1912. During his time at Forthill he was capped by Scotland four times. He also appeared for the Yorkshire Second XI (1901–1905), Yorkshire Colts (1902) and Major Shaw's XI (1906).

Born in Ganton, East Riding of Yorkshire (now North Yorkshire), Ringrose was a right arm fast medium bowler, who took 175 first-class wickets at 20.38, with a best return of 9 for 76 against the Australian tourists. He also took 7 for 51 against Leicestershire and 7 for 86 against Nottinghamshire. He took five wickets in an innings eleven times and ten wickets in a match twice. A left-handed tail end batsman, he scored 377 runs at 5.98, with a highest score of 23 against Leicestershire and took 27 catches in the field. Ringrose died in September 1943 in Manston, Cross Gates, Leeds, Yorkshire.
