= Wentworth Allen =

Irish cricketer (1894–1943)

Cricket information
- Batting: Right-handed
- Bowling: Right-arm medium

International information
- National side: Ireland

Career statistics
Competition	First-class
Matches	7
Runs scored	23
Batting average	4.60
100s/50s	0/0
Top score	10*
Balls bowled	1,083
Wickets	15
Bowling average	29.00
5 wickets in innings	0
10 wickets in match	0
Best bowling	2/20
Catches/stumpings	3/–
- Source: CricketArchive, 27 May 2021

Wentworth Allen (30 January 1894 – 22 February 1943 was an Irish cricketer. He was a right-handed batsman and a right-arm medium pace bowler.

He played eight times for Ireland between 1920 and 1925, mostly against Scotland. All but one of those matches had first-class status. He also played a first-class match for Dublin University against Northamptonshire in 1926.
