= Clydesdale Cricket Club =

Sports club in Glasgow City, Scotland

Personnel
- Captain: (Scotland)

Team information
- Founded: 1848
- Home ground: Titwood
- Capacity: 6,000

History
- SNCL Premier League wins: n/a
- Scottish Cup wins: Runner up 1873–74

Clydesdale Cricket Club is a sporting club situated at Titwood on the periphery of Pollokshields in the south of Glasgow.

== History ==
The club was founded in Kinning Park in 1848 by Archibald Campbell. It was formed by members of two previous clubs which played on Glasgow Green, to cater for the burgeoning residential developments south of the river Clyde. It is now the oldest surviving team sports club in Glasgow.

On moving to Pollokshields, the club sold its previous Kinning Park ground in 1873 to a newly founded football club called Rangers. At that time, the club also fielded a football team, Clydesdale which came second to Queens Park in the first Scottish Cup final in 1874, after many associated with the club had been instrumental in the foundation of the Scottish Football Association.

In the modern era, Clydesdale Cricket Club continues to be a major force in the amateur sporting worlds of cricket and both men's and women's hockey under the name of Clydesdale Western Hockey Club and has its own international-standard water-based synthetic-surfaced hockey pitch upgraded in 2011.

Members and former members of the club were selected to play for Scotland in the 1999 and 2007 Cricket World Cups and in the Olympic Games hockey tournaments in Barcelona, Athens, Beijing and London.

== Home ground ==
In 2007, Clydesdale's Titwood cricket ground was approved for the staging of official One-Day Internationals for crowds of up to 5,000. It became the fourth Scottish ground to be granted ODI status, as it was seen as a hub of cricket in Scotland along with The Grange, Aberdeenshire's Mannofield and Ayr's Cambusdoon New Ground.

The first of these, an 'offshore international' between India and Pakistan in July 2007 was a victim of the wet weather. The second game was played in August the same year, was between Scotland and India.

In January 2014, Titwood hosted Scotland's last three Clydesdale Bank 40 home group games.
