= Scottish County Championship =

- Countries: Scotland
- Administrator: Scottish Cricket Union
- First edition: 1902
- Latest edition: 1995
- Tournament format: One division
- Number of teams: 10 (final season)
- Most successful: Perthshire (29 titles)

The Scottish County Championship was a cricket competition which ran between 1902 and 1995, administered by the Scottish Cricket Union from 1908 onwards. The championship was founded after proposals from Perthshire and was seen as a formalised version of the county game in Scotland, which had been taking place unofficially for several years.

== History ==
In Scotland, the idea of replicating the English County Championship had been discussed for many years, without any true support materialising.

During a meeting between county team secretaries in Edinburgh in December 1901, five counties agreed to formally recognise the matches between each other in a league format. Although inter-county matches had been tabulated for several years, not all teams had played each other home and away each year. The formation of a league with standardised fixtures was seen as the next natural progression of cricket in Scotland, which had become increasingly popular in previous years.

The founding members were:

- Aberdeenshire
- Fifeshire
- Forfarshire
- Perthshire
- Stirlingshire

=== Western County Championship (1908-1910) ===
Although a regionalised 'district' county championship had been discussed as early as 1903, no concrete plan had been backed by county clubs in parts of the country not represented in the Scottish County Championship.

With the success of the county championship, several county sides in the west of Scotland formed the Western County Championship in 1908. It was hoped that interest would spark rejuvenated attendances as had happened with the 'northern' teams. Starting in 1908 three teams, Ayrshire, Lanarkshire and Renfrewshire, competed against each other for the championship. They were followed by Dumbartonshire the following year. Both Ayrshire and Dumbartonshire eventually joined in the Scottish County Championship.

The winner of the Western County Championship would then play against the winner of the Scottish County Championship to determine the outright Scottish champion. In the first year of this setup, county winners Aberdeenshire refused to play their western counterparts Renfrewshire. In the second season, Forfarshire played Renfrewshire but the match ended in a draw.

The last recorded season of the Western County Championship was in 1910. By this point, the league had adopted a second name, the 'Scottish County Championship Western Division.' Unlike their northern equivalents, the first teams of the western counties still played club cricket on Saturdays, meaning all county fixtures were played midweek.

== Teams ==
All county clubs represented in the SCC

=== Team information ===
County Club	Ground	Location	First season in Championship	First title	Last title	Titles
Aberdeenshire	Mannofield	Aberdeen	1902	1903	1988	19 (2 shared)
Arbroath County	Lochlands	Arbroath	1989	1989	1993	2
Ayrshire	Cambusdoon	Ayr	1984	1990	1991	2
Clackmannan County	The Arns	Alloa	1905	1924	1960	2
Dunbartonshire	Auchenhowie	Milngavie	1971	-	-	0
Fifeshire	McKane Park	Dunfermline	1902	1926	1939	9 (1 shared)
Forfarshire	Forthill	Dundee	1902	1902	1992	15 (1 shared)
Perthshire	North Inch	Perth	1902	1904	1978	29
Stirling County	Williamfield	Stirling	1902	1952	1985	2
Strathmore County	Lochside	Forfar	1984	1994	1994	1
West Lothian County	Boghall	Linlithgow	1930	1965	1995	3

== See also ==
- Cricket in Scotland
