= Titwood =

Sports venue in Glasgow City, Scotland

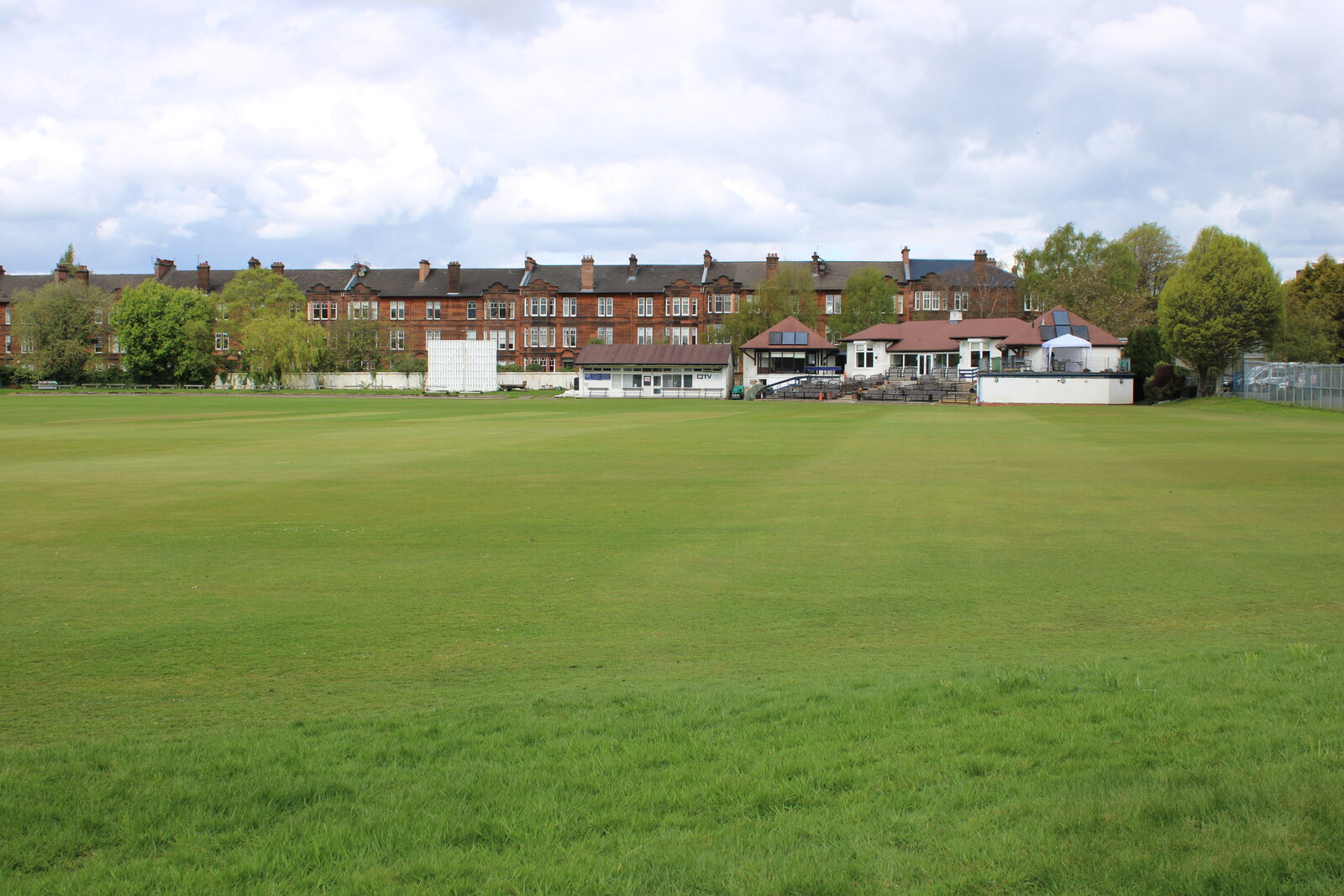
- Interactive map of Titwood

Ground information
- Location: Beaton Road, Pollokshields, Glasgow
- Country: Scotland
- Coordinates: 55.8358656°N 4.2855816°W
- Establishment: 1876
- Capacity: 6,000
- Owner: Titwood Sports Ground Trust
- Operator: Clydesdale CC
- Tenants: Clydesdale CC
- End names
- Kirkcaldy Road End; Meldrum Gardens End

International information
- First men's ODI: 16 August 2007: Scotland v India
- Last men's ODI: 17 July 2022: Scotland v Nepal
- First men's T20I: 15 June 2025: Scotland v Netherlands
- Last men's T20I: 20 June 2025: Scotland v Nepal

Team information
Clydesdale CC	(1876 – present)
- As of 20 June 2025; Source: cricinfo

Titwood is a cricket ground in the Pollokshields area of Glasgow, Scotland. It is the home of the Clydesdale Cricket Club and is one of four international grounds in Scotland approved by the International Cricket Council (ICC) as a home venue for the Scotland national cricket team.

Titwood was approved by the ICC in May 2007 for the hosting of One-Day International (ODI) matches. It became the fourth Scottish ground to be granted ODI status, as it was seen as a hub of cricket in Scotland, along with Edinburgh's The Grange, Aberdeen's Mannofield Park and New Cambusdoon in Ayr.

The first of these, an 'offshore international' between India and Pakistan in July 2007, was a victim of the wet weather. The second game was played in August the same year, between Scotland and India.

In January 2014, Titwood hosted Scotland’s last three Clydesdale Bank 40 home group games.

== History ==
Clydesdale moved to Titwood in 1876, having previously played at Kinning Park since their formation in 1848. As they had done with their former home, Clydesdale rented the grounds at Titwood from the Pollok Estate. The original pitch was situated next to Darnley Road, on land now occupied by Hutchesons' Grammar School. In 1904, the pitch was relocated westwards and a new pavilion constructed. Clydesdale bought Titwood from the Pollok Estate in 1987 for £29,000.

Titwood has been selected to host four first first-class matches involving Scotland, the first against the Marylebone Cricket Club in July 1963. The annual fixture against Ireland was staged at Titwood in 1984 and 1986. An ICC Intercontinental Cup match against Kenya was scheduled to be played on the ground in 2008, but no play was possible due to rain. In 2026, the ground was the selected venue for the first ODI match between Scotland Women and Netherlands Women.

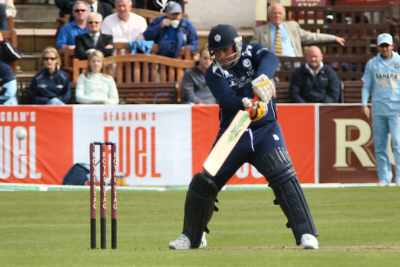
Scotland's Ryan Watson batting against India at Titwood in August 2007

== Other sports ==
=== Hockey ===
Clydesdale Hockey Club – originally Carthaginions Hockey Club, founded in 1902 – moved from their previous ground to Titwood in 1959, and were joined in 1983 by Glasgow Western Ladies Hockey Club who also made Titwood their home ground. An all-weather international standard synthetic pitch was constructed in 1997, and was used as a practice facility for the hockey teams in the 2014 Commonwealth Games.

=== Football ===
Clydesdale F.C. had been formed at Kinning Park as an offshoot of the cricket club, and moved with them to Titwood in 1876. Queen's Park played at Titwood from July 1883 to October 1884 after leaving their original Hampden Park and prior to the completion of the second Hampden Park; their time at the ground included a 6–1 victory over Aston Villa in the 1883–84 FA Cup.

=== Rugby union ===
Clydesdale RFC was a rugby union club that similarly grew out of the Clydesdale sports club. They began to play at Titwood in 1889.
