= Strathmore & Perthshire Cricket Union =

- Sport: Cricket
- Abbreviation: SPCU
- Founded: 2003
- Affiliation: Cricket Scotland
- President: Callum Glasgow
- Secretary: Derek Traill
- Replaced: Strathmore Union; Perthshire League

Official website
- spcu.hitscricket.com
- (Scotland)

The Strathmore & Perthshire Cricket Union (SPCU) is a regional cricket association in Scotland. It oversees one of four regional feeder league structures to the Eastern Premier League. The union was created by the merger of two separate associations, the Strathmore Union, formed in 1928, and the Perthshire League, formed in 1963.

== History ==
From its creation until 2011 the union operated a feeder league for the North and Midlands of the country into the Scottish National Cricket League (SNCL).

== See also ==
- Cricket in Scotland
