= Heriot's Cricket Club =

(Scotland) Heriot's Cricket Club
- Union: Cricket Scotland
- Founded: 1889
- Location: Edinburgh, Scotland
- Ground: Goldenacre Sports Ground
- President: (Scotland) Alan Hogarth
- Coach: (Scotland) Joe Kinghorn-Gray
- Captain: (South Africa) Lloyd Brown
- League: Eastern Premier Division

Official website
- www.heriotscc.co.uk

Heriot's Cricket Club is a cricket club based in Edinburgh, Scotland.

== History ==
George Heriot's School Former Pupils Cricket Club, now known as Heriot's Cricket Club, was founded at a meeting held in Edinburgh's George Heriot's School on 5 December 1889. The foundation took some months before that of the Former Pupils Rugby Club in October 1890, Heriot's Rugby Club so the Cricket Club is the senior Heriots Former Pupils Club. Its first home was the almost as-new Logie Green (also known as Puddocky thanks to a local population of frogs), the school sports ground in the Warriston district of Edinburgh. The move to the present ground at Goldenacre, Goldenacre less than half a mile away, was completed in 1902. The ground's red-brick pavilion, which still dominates the main square as well as commanding views of Edinburgh, also dates back to that time. The very first delivery at Goldenacre, by William White of Heriot's, produced a simple caught-and-bowled chance, promptly grassed – not the last easy catch to be dropped at the ground.

== Groundsman as a 'professional' ==
The club has always had at least two regular elevens, and often three or four, as well as a continuing link with Heriot's School and its teams through junior sides. However, some of its earliest members were not Herioters, including its first Scottish cap, batsman John Mushet (who played once, against Australia in 1912). Other members were teachers at the School. Mushet aside, probably the club's finest early player was John Waddell, who inaugurated a tradition of spin bowling (left-arm, in Waddell's case) and took nearly 300 wickets in six seasons before his early death in 1899. The Club groundsman was also usually a competent player, who would play for the team as the "professional". This tradition continued until the 1970s, with names including David "Pa" Nicoll, Arthur Creber and George Waites. By 1914, when play was stopped by the outbreak of war across Europe, the fixture list included most of Scotland's leading clubs outside the already existent Western Union.

== Post-war era ==
After the First World War, Heriot's FP emerged as one of the leading Clubs in the east of Scotland. The playing facilities at Goldenacre expanded to their present dimensions with two, sometimes three, squares. Several talented players appeared, such as batsman Alec Bateman, off-spinner Alex Gordon, opening bowler Jack Nicoll, and aggressive all-rounder Sid Plowright. But only two were capped, all-rounder Charles Groves and Club professional Arthur Creber, a quick bowler who has the only "all-10" in the First XI's history. Wicketkeeper Lindsay Mitchell would later become an influential figure as master in charge of cricket at the School, especially in the period after 1950 when a flood of playing talent emerged to inaugurate the club's most successful period on the field, between 1966 and 1985.

There was no East League until 1953. Once formed, however, Heriot's FP immediately became one of its leading sides, regularly challenging for the title of champions, although with no ultimate success for many years. The bowling attack was spearheaded by international fast bowlers Jim Souness and George Miller when available; Ken Scotland, also known as one of the many Herioter Scotland rugby full-backs, was also capped at cricket in 1955. The club had strength in depth too, with the Second XI winning its league (the Grade A) four times between 1954 and 1960. On the social side, developments included the licensing of a bar in the Club pavilion, the main mover being long-time member and later club president Jim Adair.

Towards the end of the 1950s, two cricketers from Heriot's School, off-spinning all-rounder George Goddard and opening batsman/wicketkeeper Hamish More, emerged as prominent players. The club won the East League for the first time in 1966 and retained the title in 1969 and 1970. Goddard and More became the first former Heriot's players to establish regular places in the Scotland national team. More scored his first international century in 1969, and Goddard was appointed captain of Scotland in 1974.

== Open era ==
Heriot's FP went "open" in 1974, allowing a limited number of non-Herioters to become members. This move heralded a spectacular period of consistent success in an increasingly competitive East League. The championship was won eight times between 1974 and 1983, including seven successive titles from 1977 on. In addition the Club took the Scottish Cup in 1978, defeating ancient rivals Watsonians at Hamilton Crescent. Key recruits included internationalist opening bowlers in Peter Rhind, Eric Thompson and Jack Ker, alongside batsman Andrew Ker (who was first capped from the club). George Goddard and Hamish More continued amongst the leading players in Scotland throughout, and two other home-grown Herioters, spinners Richard Rodger and Euan McIntyre, were also capped in this remarkable period. Heriot's strength in depth was also apparent in the Second XI's four Grade A titles between 1971 and 1982.

The run-up to the club's celebration of its centenary season in 1989 was not so successful in terms of league titles and trophies, although the Second XI won the Grade A league again in 1988 (including a "10-for" performance by Dave McDougall). The centenary was marked not only by a cricket week blessed with fine weather and good matches, but also by publication of a detailed Club history which has since been enthusiastically reviewed by no less than best-selling author Alexander McCall Smith Alexander mccall smith (see his Love over Scotland (2006) p. 18). The interior of the Goldenacre pavilion, including the bar area, was modernised by the Heriot Trust in a further marking of the club's century.

== 1990's ==
The Goddard-More era ended in the early 1990s, the two having left far behind all previous Club wicket-taking and run-scoring record. Nonetheless, the Club entered the Scottish National League in 1996 as champions of the East League once again, having taken the title in successive seasons in 1994 and 1995. The Scottish Cup was won again in 2000, with victory over Grange in a match played at Boghall, Linlithgow. The National League has never been won but the Club remained in the Premier Division until the end of the 2009 season, when relegation followed defeat in a play-off with Forfarshire. However 2010 saw an immediate return to the top flight, and in 2012 the Scottish Cup was won again (and again against Watsonians, as in 1978), with the final taking place this time at Titwood in Glasgow. In the latter period of the club's history caps have been gained by Mike Allingham, Asim Butt, John Blain, Sean Weeraratna, Dewalt Nel, Stephen Knox and, continuing the More family theme, young Robert More (son of George) was capped in 2002.

The club's name-change, mentioned in the first paragraph above, resulted from the increasingly "open" nature of the membership; but it continues to enjoy strong links and relations with George Heriots School.

== Rugby internationalists that played cricket for Heriot's ==
Several rugby internationalists have turned out for Heriot's Cricket Club over the years and the club still retains strong links with its sister rugby club.

Ken Scotland, Adam Buchanan-Smith, Andrew Ker (Kelso RFC) and Gordon Ross have all been capped for Scotland at rugby while playing their cricket at Goldenacre in the summer months.

== Home ground – Goldenacre ==
Those who know Goldenacre will be aware that the square was moved some years ago, with the famous slope being removed to leave a level outfield. The square has taken some time to "bed in"; however head groundsman Simon Theurer assisted by consultant Steve Wright, the former chief groundsman at Leicestershire County Cricket Club, toiled mightily in 2007 and the deck is becoming harder and faster. The club in conjunction with the school is looking to update many aspects of the ground and construct a new all weather net and practice facility.

== 2012 – Scottish Cup winners ==
Heriot's won the Scottish Cup in 2012 defeating Edinburgh rivals Watsonians in the final by 6 wickets.

The 1st XI, captained by Scottish international cap Steve Knox, currently play in the Eastern Premier Division and run 3 senior and 3 junior teams. The club is entirely open nowadays and acts as a draw for top cricket players and aspiring youngsters from across the North of Edinburgh and Leith in particular.

== 2013 ==
In 2013 Heriot's finished sixth in the Eastern Premier Division and reached the final of the Masterton Trophy, losing to close rival Grange in the final. The 3rd XI finished second in their league and got promoted. Cameron Farrell scored a record (including Masterton Trophy games) number of runs with 817 and an average of 68.08. Mark Watt finished top of the bowling figures taking 37 wickets at an average of 17.59. Mark Watt featured in the Scotland U/19 team that went to the World Cup in Sri Lanka at the end of the season.

== 2014 season – 125th year ==
In 2014 the club played once again in the Eastern Premier Division captained by Cameron Farrell, Steve Knox as coach and Chris Middleton as president. The club celebrated 125 years playing a Scotland XI on 27 July at Goldenacre as part of the celebrations.

The club finished 4th overall in the Premiership and the Under 18 team won the Scottish Championship for the first time in the club's history. Led by Mark Watt the team defeated Carlton in the final and also accounted for Grange, Watsonians, Clydesdale and Ayr en route to winning the Championship. Watt was subsequently called into the full Scotland squad.

== Current ==
The current set up holds a first XI in the Eastern Premier Division, Second XI in ESCA Championship and Third XI in ESCA Division 2. The junior set up has the All stars, under 10's and under 12's . The All Stars programmes we run is the largest in Scotland for youngsters aged 5–8 wanting and introduction to cricket and junior training on Monday, Tuesday and Friday evenings throughout the summer. Adult training is held on Tuesday and Thursday from 6pm till 8pm at Goldenacre.

== Current 1st XI squad ==
- (South Africa) Hayes Van Der Berg
- (Scotland) Joe Kinghorn-Gray
- (Scotland) Keith Morton
- (Scotland) Mathew Cross (+)
- (Scotland) Elliot Ruthven
- (Scotland) Chris Ashforth
- (Scotland) Ryan Brown
- (Scotland) Mark Watt
- (Scotland) Peter Arthur Ross
- (Scotland) Adrian Neill
- (South Africa) Michael Shean
- (Scotland) Callum Stuart
- (Scotland) Gavin Main
- (South Africa) Lloyd Brown (C)
