= The Meadow, Downpatrick =

Cricket ground in Northern Ireland

Coordinates: 54°20′12″N 5°42′55″W

The Meadow
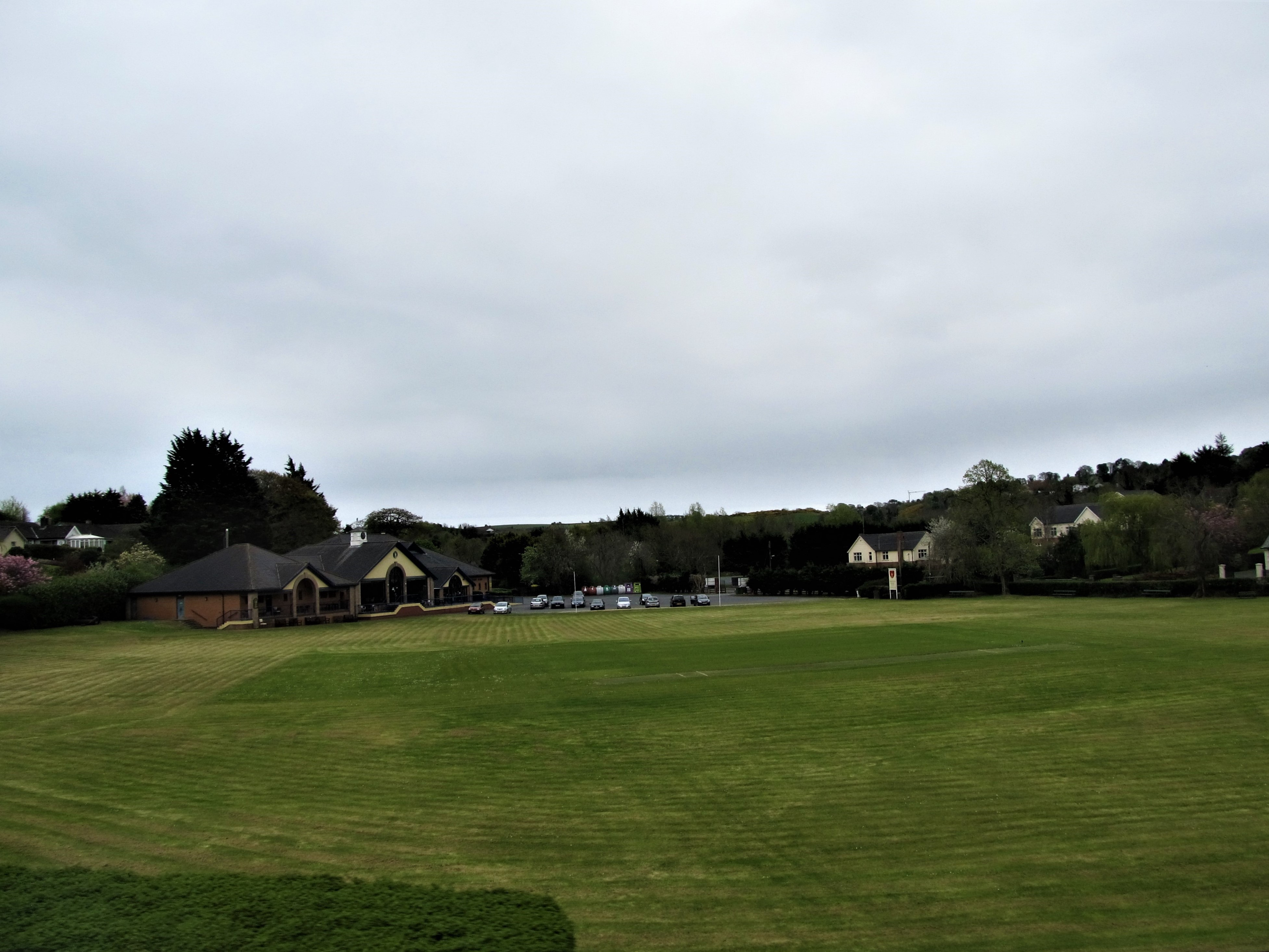
- Interactive map of The Meadow
- Location: Downpatrick, Northern Ireland
- Country: Ireland
- As of 29 August 2011; Source: Ground profile

The Meadow is a cricket ground in Downpatrick, Northern Ireland. It is the home of Downpatrick Cricket Club.

In 1983, the ground hosted what is the only first-class match to be played there when Ireland played Scotland, which resulted in an Irish victory by 5 wickets. In 1990, the ground hosted its first List A match when Ireland played Sussex in the NatWest Trophy. The ground hosted a further List A match in the 1997 Benson & Hedges Cup between Ireland and Essex, before hosting two List A matches in the 2005 ICC Trophy. The first of these saw the UAE play the United States, which resulted in a 55 run victory for the UAE. The second match saw Canada play Papua New Guinea, which resulted in a Canadian victory by 160 runs.
