= East of Scotland Cricket Association =

- Sport: Cricket
- Abbreviation: ESCA
- President: Kashif Hussain

Official website
- www.eastleague.org.uk
- (Scotland)

The East of Scotland Cricket Association (ESCA) manages amateur cricket in the east of Scotland.

From Hawick & Wilton in the South to Dunnikier in the North, Kelso and Dunbar in the East and Westquarter & Redding in the West, the ESCA covers a wide range of clubs forming ten divisions of amateur cricket.

ESCA comes under the overall National Governing body umbrella of Cricket Scotland.

President
2023 – present	Kashif Hussain
2018 – 2023	Neil Granger
2016 - 2018	David Gibson
2014 - 2016	Phil Yelland
2011 – 2014	Paul Bailey
