= The Grange Club =

Cricket and sports club in the Stockbridge district of Edinburgh, Scotland

- The Grange
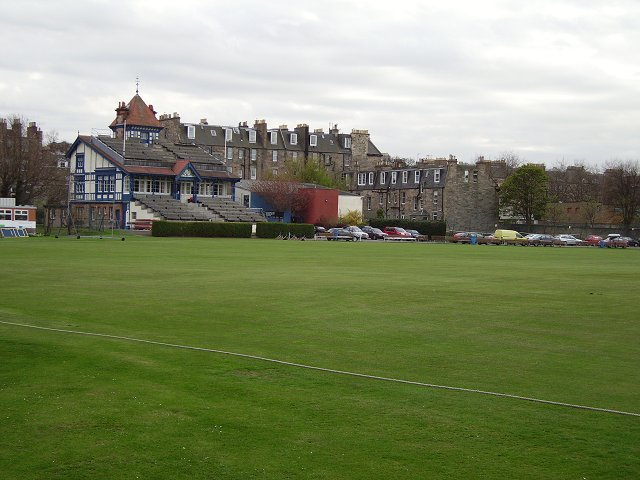
- The clubhouse
- Interactive map of The Grange Club

Ground information
- Location: 7 Portgower Place, Edinburgh
- Country: Scotland
- Coordinates: 55.961°N 3.213°W
- Establishment: 1832
- Capacity: 5,000
- Owner: The Grange Club
- Tenants: Scotland national cricket team (1999–present)
- End names
- Pavilion End; Nursery End

International information
- First men's ODI: 24 May 1999: Scotland v Bangladesh
- Last men's ODI: 31 July 2022: Scotland v New Zealand
- First men's T20I: 9 July 2015: Scotland v United Arab Emirates
- Last men's T20I: 7 September 2024: Scotland v Australia
- First women's T20I: 5 September 2022: Scotland v Ireland
- Last women's T20I: 6 September 2022: Scotland v Ireland
- As of 28 July 2023; Source: ESPNcricinfo

The Grange Club is a cricket and sports club in the Stockbridge district of Edinburgh, Scotland. The cricket ground, commonly known as The Grange, is the regular home of the Scotland national cricket team, and is situated adjacent to the Edinburgh Academy sports ground, which is in Raeburn Place.

== History ==
The Grange Club was founded in 1832, in The Grange district of Edinburgh. In 1872 it moved to its current location at Raeburn Place in the Stockbridge district and has hosted out of its pavilion since 1893. The pavilion cost £1,400 and was officially opened on 29 June 1893 by Lord Moncrieff. The pavilion was restored in 1998 at a cost of £450,000.

After the Scottish Cricket Union disbanded in 1883 The Grange Club assumed responsibility as the governing body of cricket in Scotland for a time and still holds considerable national influence.

The decorative scheme to the interior of the Pavilion is designed to complement the exterior. The Long Room, is modelled on the Marylebone Cricket Club's 'Long Room' at Lord's Cricket Ground, London.

The club was also associated with The Dyvours Club, Edinburgh's oldest lawn tennis club, who were founded in 1883, and played on the grounds.

== Cricket ==
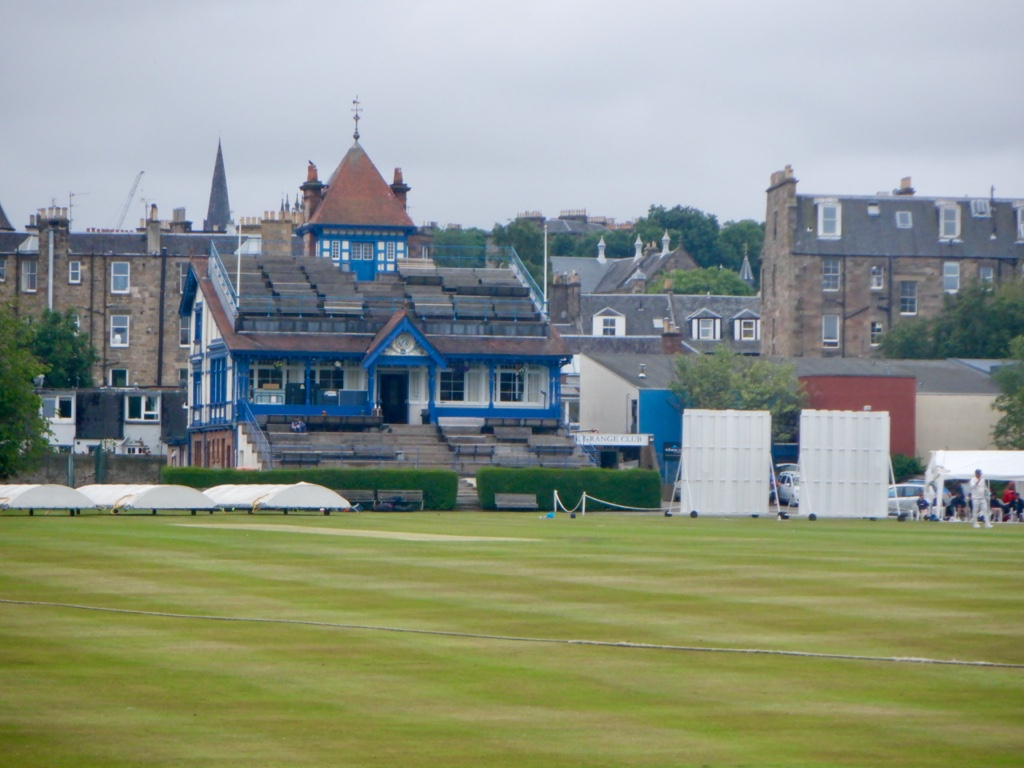
View of the clubhouse, 2021

The Grange has hosted numerous high-profile international matches over the years featuring teams such as Australia, Pakistan, England and New Zealand. Some of the world's finest cricketers have played at The Grange, from W. G. Grace in 1895 and Donald Bradman in 1948 to Brian Lara in 1995, Shane Warne and Andrew Flintoff. The ground has hosted Scotland's home matches in ECB domestic cricket competitions.

International venue

The Grange hosted Scotland's first official One Day International (ODI) outside of a Cricket World Cup on 27 June 2006. A capacity crowd saw Scotland lose by five wickets to Pakistan. It was selected as a venue to host matches in the 2015 ICC World Twenty20 Qualifier tournament.

Clubs

The Grange Club is the home ground for:

- The Grange Cricket Club – The Grange Cricket Club is an amateur cricket club whose 1st XI play in the Cricket Scotland Eastern Premiership, the top tier of cricket for teams of the East of Scotland Cricket Association (ESCA) and Strathmore & Perthshire Cricket Union regional associations. The club 2nd XI play in the ESCA Baillie Gifford Championship Division. The Grange Cricket Club has won the Scottish Cup six times, the East of Scotland League (1953–1996) fourteen times and the Scottish National Cricket League (1997–present) five times.
- The Eastern Knights – As of 2016 The Grange Club has also been one of the home grounds for the Eastern Knights, who play in the Regional Pro Series, the highest, and only professional, tier of Scottish cricket.
- Scotland national cricket team – The Grange is perhaps most importantly home to the Scotland national cricket team, who represent Scotland for cricket in international matches.

== Cricket World Cup ==
The Grange hosted two ODIs during the 1999 Cricket World Cup.

24 May 1999
Scorecard

Bangladesh; 185/9 (50 overs)	v	Scotland; 163 (46.2 overs)
Minhajul Abedin 68* (116); John Blain 4/37 (10 overs)		Gavin Hamilton 63 (71); Hasibul Hossain 2/26 (8 overs)

Bangladesh won by 22 runs
Grange Cricket Club Ground, Edinburgh
Umpires: K. T. Francis (SL) and Dave Orchard (SA)
Player of the match: Minhajul Abedin (Ban)

- Scotland won the toss and elected to field.

31 May 1999
Scorecard

Scotland; 121 (42.1 overs)	v	New Zealand; 123/4 (17.5 overs)
Ian Stanger 27 (58); Chris Harris 4/7 (3.1 overs)		Roger Twose 54* (49); John Blain 3/53 (7 overs)

New Zealand won by 6 wickets
Grange Cricket Club Ground, Edinburgh
Umpires: Rudi Koertzen (SA) and Ian Robinson (Zim)
Player of the match: Geoff Allott (NZ)

- New Zealand won the toss and elected to field.
- New Zealand needed to score 122 within 21.2 overs to qualify for Super Sixes stage. New Zealand qualified for Super Sixes. West Indies eliminated.

== Scotland v Australia September 2013 ==
=== Only ODI ===
3 September 2013
10:45
Scorecard

Australia; 362/3 (50 overs)	v	Scotland; 162 (43.5 overs)
Shaun Marsh 151 (151); Iain Wardlaw 2/69 (10 overs)		Matt Machan 39 (54); Mitchell Johnson 4/36 (9.5 overs)

Australia won by 200 runs
Grange Cricket Club Ground, Edinburgh
Umpires: Ian Ramage (Sco) and Sundaram Ravi (Ind)

- Scotland won the toss and elected to field.
- Fawad Ahmed (Aus) and Hamish Gardiner (Sco) made their ODI debuts.

== Scotland v England June 2018 ==
=== Only ODI ===
10 June 2018
11:00
Scorecard

Scotland; 371/5 (50 overs)	v	England; 365 (48.5 overs)
Calum MacLeod 140* (94); Adil Rashid 2/72 (10 overs)		Jonny Bairstow 105 (59); Mark Watt 3/55 (10)

Scotland won by 6 runs
Grange Cricket Club Ground, Edinburgh
Umpires: Marais Erasmus (SA) and Allan Haggo (Sco)
Player of the match: Calum MacLeod (Sco)

- England won the toss and elected to field.
- Dylan Budge (Sco) made his ODI debut.
- Calum MacLeod scored the fastest century by a batsman for Scotland in ODIs and became the first batsman for Scotland to score a century in ODIs against England.
- Scotland made their highest score in ODIs and the highest score by an Associate team against a Full Member team.
- Jonny Bairstow became the first batsman for England to score centuries in three consecutive ODIs.
- Scotland win for the first time against England in any format.

== International centuries ==
=== One Day Internationals ===
Fourteen ODI centuries have been scored on the ground.

No.	Batter	Date	Team	Opponent	Score	Balls	Result
1	David Hussey	28 August 2009	Australia	Scotland	111	83	Won
2	Paul Stirling	12 July 2011	Ireland	Scotland	113	95	Lost
3	Aaron Finch	3 September 2013	Australia	Scotland	148	114	Won
4	Shaun Marsh	3 September 2013	Australia	Scotland	151	151	Won
5	Rahmat Shah (1/2)	4 July 2016	Afghanistan	Scotland	100*	123	No result
6	Kyle Coetzer (1/2)	14 August 2016	Scotland	United Arab Emirates	127	121	Won
7	Preston Mommsen	14 August 2016	Scotland	United Arab Emirates	111*	101	Won
8	Calum MacLeod (1/4)	16 August 2016	Scotland	United Arab Emirates	103	122	Won
9	Calum MacLeod (2/4)	10 September 2016	Scotland	Hong Kong	102	107	Won
10	Kyle Coetzer (2/2)	15 June 2017	Scotland	Zimbabwe	109	101	Won
11	Calum MacLeod (3/4)	10 June 2018	Scotland	England	140*	94	Won
12	Jonny Bairstow	10 June 2018	England	Scotland	105	59	Lost
13	Calum MacLeod (4/4)	10 May 2019	Scotland	Afghanistan	100	89	Lost
14	Rahmat Shah (2/2)	10 May 2019	Afghanistan	Scotland	113	115	Won

== Five-wicket hauls ==
=== One Day Internationals ===
Four ODI five-wicket hauls have been taken on the ground.

No.	Bowler	Date	Team	Opponent	Inn	Overs	Runs	Wkts	Econ	Result
1	Gordon Goudie	28 August 2009	Scotland	Australia	1	10	73	5	7.30	Lost
2	Lasith Malinga	13 July 2011	Sri Lanka	Scotland	2	9.4	30	5	3.10	Won
3	Con de Lange	15 June 2017	Scotland	Zimbabwe	2	8	60	5	7.50	Won
4	Graeme Cremer	17 June 2017	Zimbabwe	Scotland	1	10	29	5	2.90	Won

=== Twenty20 Internationals ===
Only one Twenty20 five-wicket hauls have been taken on the ground.

No.	Bowler	Date	Team	Opponent	Inn	Overs	Runs	Wkts	Econ	Result
1	Alasdair Evans	11 July 2015	Scotland	Netherlands	1	4	24	5	6.00	Lost

== Squash, tennis and hockey ==
The Grange also hosts other sports besides cricket. It has five squash courts, which support men's and ladies' teams that compete at all regional and national levels. Uniquely for a private club in Scotland, The Grange is also home to The Dyvours Club which has four grass tennis courts and four floodlit astroturf courts. Grange Hockey Club supports eight men's hockey teams which represents a broad range of ability. The 1st XI recently played in Europe, having won the Scottish Cup, and also play in the Euro Hockey League. The Grange Club is also home to Grange Edinburgh Ladies Hockey Club with four teams. All the constituent clubs have vibrant junior sections.

== See also ==
- List of Category A listed buildings in Edinburgh
- Edinburgh Academical Cricket Club
- Heriot's Cricket Club
