= Cricket Scotland =

National governing body of cricket in Scotland

- Scottish Gaelic: Criogaid na h-Alba
- Sport: Cricket
- Jurisdiction: Scotland
- Abbreviation: CS
- Founded: 1 January 1908 (118 years ago)
- Affiliation: International Cricket Council
- Affiliation date: 15 June 1994 (32 years ago)
- Regional affiliation: ICC Europe
- Affiliation date: 1997; 29 years ago
- Headquarters: Edinburgh, Scotland
- Location: National Cricket Academy, MES Sports Centre, Ravelston, Edinburgh EH4 3NT
- President: Omar Henry
- Chairperson: Wilf Walsh
- CEO: Trudy Lindblade
- Sponsor: Skyscanner (Lead), Gray-Nicolls, The Parkmead Group
- (founded): 1879

Official website
- www.cricketscotland.com
- (Scotland)

Cricket Scotland (abbreviated as CS; Scottish Gaelic: Criogaid na h-Alba) is the national governing body of cricket in Scotland. It is responsible for the regulation, promotion, and strategic development of the game across all levels, from grassroots community initiatives and disability programmes to the management of the senior men's and women's national representative teams. Headquartered at the National Cricket Academy in Edinburgh, Cricket Scotland operates as an Associate Member of the International Cricket Council (ICC), a status it has maintained since 1994.

The board oversees all levels of cricket in Scotland, including the national teams (men's and women's), youth development squads, and representative disability teams. Originally founded in 1908 as the Scottish Cricket Union (SCU), the organisation underwent a major restructuring in 2001 and was renamed Cricket Scotland. In recent years, the organisation has implemented profound governance reforms following the 2022 "Changing the Boundaries" report into institutional racism, transitioning from "special measures" to a state of enhanced oversight by sportscotland.

Scottish cricket has a distinguished pedigree stretching back to 1783, when the first recorded match was played at Schaw Park, Alloa. The oldest club in the country is Kelso, founded in 1820. The Scottish Cricket Union was first established in 1879, but only existed for four years due to lack of membership and financial difficulties; a new Union was created in 1908, which continues to exist today following the 2001 name change to Cricket Scotland.

== Structure and role ==
Cricket Scotland is run by an executive leadership team that reports to a single Board of Directors. Trudy Lindblade took over as permanent CEO in August 2024, following interim leadership. She reports to the Chairperson, Wilf Walsh.

The organisation maintains a single-board structure with diversity targets mandated by sportscotland. The Board must maintain a makeup of at least 25% from ethnically diverse backgrounds and a gender balance of at least 40% men and 40% women.

The board is supported by several sub-committees, including:

- Domestic Cricket Committee (DCC): Established to oversee grassroots growth and club relations.
- Performance Cricket Committee: Responsible for high-performance pathways, with members such as Emma Calvert and Sadia Sheikh appointed in early 2026.

Cricket Scotland oversees five regional associations that manage local league cricket:

- Western District Cricket Union (WDCU)
- East of Scotland Cricket Association (ESCA)
- North of Scotland Cricket Association (NOSCA)
- Strathmore & Perthshire Cricket Union (SPCU)
- North East Scotland Cricket (NESC)

In 2026, the organisation completed a transition to the PlayHQ platform, unifying player registration and live scoring across all regions into a single system.

== National teams ==
=== Men's team ===
Scotland represents the nation in international competition. While not a Test-playing nation, Scotland has been a leading Associate Member, winning the inaugural ICC Intercontinental Cup in 2004 and the ICC Trophy in 2005. The team is captained by Richie Berrington. Doug Watson was appointed head coach in 2023 and departed in September 2025; he was succeeded by Owen Dawkins on 1 December 2025, with former Scotland skipper Gordon Drummond appointed as assistant coach.

In January 2026, the ICC announced that Scotland would replace Bangladesh in the 2026 ICC Men's T20 World Cup in India and Sri Lanka. Skyscanner serves as the lead sponsor for this tournament. Scotland lost their opening match to West Indies, but bounced back to beat tournament debutants Italy by 73 runs at Eden Gardens, Kolkata, on 9 February 2026— their first win of the tournament. George Munsey top-scored with 84 and Michael Leask took 4 for 17.

=== Women's team ===
Professionalisation of the women's game is a cornerstone of the 2024–2028 strategy. Following the introduction of equal match fees in 2021, Cricket Scotland awarded its first full-time professional contracts to nine female players in May 2023: Abbi Aitken-Drummond, Priyanaz Chatterji, Katherine Fraser, Lorna Jack, Ailsa Lister, Megan McColl, Orla Montgomery, Hannah Rainey and Ellen Watson. The team is captained by Kathryn Bryce, who was named the ICC Associate Women's Cricketer of the Decade for 2011–2020. Craig Wallace was appointed permanent head coach in August 2024, having previously served as interim head coach and guided the squad to qualification for the ICC Women's T20 World Cup.

=== Disability teams ===
Cricket Scotland operates inclusive programmes in partnership with Scottish Disability Sport. These include Super 1s and Table Cricket. Three clubs—Dumfries, Strathmore, and Westquarter & Redding—serve as "Disability Cricket Champion Clubs".

== Regional and domestic cricket ==
=== Domestic leagues and competitions ===
The domestic structure transitions players from club levels to national squads through a tiered league system. The top tier of club cricket consists of the Eastern Premier League (EPL) and the Western Premiership One. The Eastern Premier League was formed in 2012 as part of a nationwide restructure and comprises ten teams from the East of Scotland Cricket Association and the Strathmore & Perthshire Cricket Union, playing 50-over matches in a round-robin format. National knockout competitions include the Scottish Cup—first staged in 1966 and won most often by Grange, with nine titles—and the T20 Scottish Cup. The winners of the Eastern Premier League and the Western Premiership contest the annual Cricket Scotland Grand Final.

=== Regional Series ===
To bridge the gap to international cricket, Cricket Scotland runs the Men's Regional Super Series, featuring district-based teams. The men's competition includes the Eastern Knights, Western Warriors, and Caledonian Highlanders. The series was originally held as the Regional Pro Series from 2016 to 2021, after which it was not held as a formalized league for several seasons while the organisation transitioned to the Performance Pathway model. In 2026, the Regional Super Series was revived, consisting of three T20 triple-headers in June followed by three 50-over match days in July, with a cumulative points tally across both formats contributing to the final standings.

== Women's Super Series ==
The women's equivalent, the Women's Regional Super Series, is a rivalry between the Eagles and the Stormers. The series was active as of August 2026, when the Stormers defeated the Eagles by 38 runs.

== Development programmes ==
Cricket Scotland maintains extensive development pathways designed to transition players from grassroots club cricket to international representation. The Performance Pathway, restructured in 2023, coordinates regional U15, U17, and Scotland U19 team fixtures alongside national development squads, providing structured progression for talented young cricketers. In 2024, Cricket Scotland launched the regional squads trials process for the 2024/2025 winter programme, open to boys (U15/U17) and girls (U15/U18) born on or after 1 September 2006.

At the community level, Cricket Scotland works in partnership with Scottish Disability Sport to deliver inclusive cricket opportunities. The Super 1s and Table Cricket programmes are offered nationwide, with Dumfries, Strathmore, and Westquarter & Redding serving as "Disability Cricket Champion Clubs".

The National Cricket Academy in Edinburgh serves as the headquarters and primary training facility for Cricket Scotland, hosting coaching programmes, performance squads, and national team preparations.

== Institutional history ==
Scottish cricket dates back to 1783, with the oldest club, Kelso, founded in 1820. The first Scottish Cricket Union was established in 1879, but only existed for four years due to lack of membership and financial difficulties. A new Union was created in 1908, which continues to exist today following the 2001 name change to Cricket Scotland. The true awakening of cricket as a national sport was stimulated when Scotland was admitted to the Benson & Hedges Cup tournament against the English counties in 1980. Scotland applied to become an independent, Associate Member of the ICC in 1992, and this status was granted in 1994. Scotland became the first ICC Member to hold two senior trophies at the same time when it won the inaugural ICC Intercontinental Cup in 2004 and the ICC Trophy in 2005.

Historically, Scotland produced players like Mike Denness, the only Scotsman to captain England in Tests.

In 2022, the organisation faced a crisis when the "Changing the Boundaries" report found the leadership to be institutionally racist, identifying 448 indicators of institutional racism across 31 tests; Cricket Scotland failed on 29 and only partially met the required standard on the remaining two. The review was undertaken following complaints of institutional racism by two Scotland cricket internationals, Majid Haq and Qasim Sheikh. This led to a period of "special measures" by sportscotland, which included requirements to complete Board and CEO recruitment, establish an Anti-racism and EDI Task Force, update all policies with an anti-racism lens, produce an EDI strategy, and develop an independent disciplinary framework. In November 2024, Cricket Scotland was moved out of special measures into enhanced oversight after completing the action plan and publishing its Equality, Diversity and Inclusion (EDI) Strategy.

=== Hall of Fame ===
Established in 2011, the Cricket Scotland Hall of Fame was revamped in 2025. Kari Carswell was named the first female inductee. The inaugural 2011 inductees were chosen by a panel including chief executive Roddy Smith, chairman Keith Oliver, historian Neil Leitch, journalist Norman Mair, and former players George Goddard and Craig Wright, and spanned five historical periods from pre-1909 to the present day. Notable members include:

- Mike Denness (inducted 2011)
- Jimmy Allan (inducted 2011)
- Neil McCallum (inducted 2025)
- Kari Carswell (inducted 2025)
- Fraser Watts (inducted 2025)
- George Reifer (inducted 2025)

== Major domestic competitions ==
- Eastern Premier League
- Western Premiership One
- Scottish Cup
- T20 Scottish Cup
- Women's Super Series
- Cricket Scotland Grand Final
- Men's Regional Super Series

== See also ==
- 2026 European T20 Premier League
- Scotland national cricket team
- Scotland women's national cricket team
- Cricket in Scotland
- East of Scotland Cricket Association
- Strathmore & Perthshire Cricket Union
