= 1903 Scottish County Championship =

- Tournament format: League system
- Champions: Aberdeenshire (1st title)
- Participants: 5
- Matches: 17

The 1903 Scottish County Championship was the second running of the Scottish County Championship which ran from 28 May to 22 August 1903. Aberdeenshire won their first title.

== Overview ==
=== Failed expansion plans ===
It had been intended that a further team would be included in the 1903 championship, a team representing Midlothian County. Although there was no agreement in place by the time the fixture list was created, it was hoped that a team could be formed and would play its matches in the midweek for the first season, as the newly-formed Fifeshire had done the previous year.

This arrangement for a Midlothian team never came to fruition, in the 1903 season or any other, and so the same five founding teams played each other again.

=== North Inch disaster ===
On 1 August, a temporary stand holding an estimated 488 people collapsed at the North Inch in Perth, injuring at least 150 people, with over a dozen of these being very serious. In an inquest later in the year, a judge absolved Perthshire of any fault and instead found the company contracted to build the stand had failed to properly construct it. The judge also ruled that there had not been an adequate inspection by the town's building surveyor prior to it opening.

== Final table ==
One point was awarded for a win, and one point was taken away for each loss, therefore:

- 1 for a win
- 0 for a draw
- -1 for a loss

Final placings were decided by dividing the number of points earned by the number of completed matches (i.e. those that ended in a win or a loss), and multiplying by 100. Abandoned matches were counted as draws.

Team	Pld	W	T	L	D	Pts	Fin	%Fin
Aberdeenshire	7	4	0	0	3	4	4	100.00
Forfarshire	8	4	0	1	3	3	5	60.00
Stirlingshire	8	1	0	2	5	-1	3	-33.33
Perthshire	7	0	0	2	5	-2	3	-66.67
Fifeshire	6	0	0	4	2	-4	5	-80.00
