= Willie Donald =

Scottish cricketer and administrator (1953–2022)

Personal information
- Full name: William Alexander Donald
- Born: 29 July 1953; Huntly, Aberdeenshire, Scotland
- Died: 13 November 2022 (aged 69); Edinburgh, Midlothian, Scotland
- Batting: Right-handed
- Bowling: Right-arm medium

Domestic team information
- Years: Team
- 1978–1987: Scotland

Career statistics
Competition	First-class	List A
Matches	8	32
Runs scored	221	492
Batting average	20.09	15.37
100s/50s	–/–	–/2
Top score	45	59
Balls bowled	474	960
Wickets	5	14
Bowling average	32.80	39.71
5 wickets in innings	–	–
10 wickets in match	–	–
Best bowling	3/17	2/30
Catches/stumpings	4/–	6/–
- Source: Cricinfo, 31 July 2022

William Alexander Donald (29 July 1953 – 13 November 2022) was a Scottish cricketer and administrator. A right-handed batsman and right-armed medium-pace bowler, Donald played for the Scotland national cricket team in 8 first-class and 32 List A matches. Donald worked as a banker and spent 11 years in London. On his return to Scotland he returned to cricket, being appointed interim chief executive of Cricket Scotland in 2015. He became the organisation's president in 2018 for a two-year term. He was also president of Aberdeenshire Cricket Club from 2019.

== Early life and playing career ==
Donald was born in July 1953 at Huntly, Aberdeenshire. He was educated in Huntly at The Gordon Schools, before matriculating to the University of Aberdeen. At university, he played football as a striker for Aberdeen University F.C. A club cricketer for Huntly, his skills as a cricketer saw him progress to play for Aberdeenshire Cricket Club.

Donald later made his debut for Scotland in first-class cricket against Ireland at Glasgow in 1978. He played first-class cricket for Scotland until 1986, making eight appearances, all of which came against Ireland in the annual match between the sides. As a batsman, he scored 221 runs in his eight first-class matches at an average of 20.09, with a highest score of 45. With his right-arm medium pace bowling, he took 5 wickets with best figures of 3 for 17. In addition to playing first-class cricket for Scotland, Donald also played List A one-day cricket. He played in Scotland's inaugural List A match against Leicestershire in the 1980 Benson & Hedges Cup, and later featured in Scotland's first one-day victory against Lancashire at Perth in the 1986 Benson & Hedges Cup. Donald was a regular feature in the Scottish one-day side until 1987, making 32 appearances across the Benson & Hedges Cup and the NatWest Trophy. In these matches, he scored 492 runs at an average of 15.37; he scored two half centuries, with a highest score of 59 against Northamptonshire in 1985.

In the winter, Donald played football in the Highland League for Huntly, Fraserburgh, and Peterhead. He began to forge his career in banking in the 1970s, working for CitiBank in Aberdeen.

== Later life and administration ==
Having played club cricket for Aberdeenshire for 12 years, four of which he spent as captain, Donald moved to London where he spent eleven years. During his time in London, he played club cricket for Teddington Cricket Club. His job in banking saw him return to Scotland in 1995, with him joining West Lothian Cricket Club. He was appointed interim chief executive of Cricket Scotland in 2015. He was later appointed president of Cricket Scotland in 2018, for a two year term lasting until 2020. In 2019, he was appointed president of Aberdeenshire Cricket Club, succeeding David Hays. His presidency saw the return of international cricket to Mannofield Park.

Donald was critical of the findings of the 2022 investigation into alleged racism in Scottish cricket. While accepting that the recommendations of the investigation needed to be implemented, he was critical that the investigation had not spoken to him, where in his role as interim chief executive of Cricket Scotland he handled Majid Haq being sent home from the 2015 World Cup and suspended. Donald ascertained that his suspension was not racial, but was a result of Haq's poor fitness standards.

Outside cricket, Donald ran a small executive coaching consultancy business, specialising in performance improvement and organisational change. In his final months he had cancer, which he received treatment. He stepped down as president of Aberdeenshire Cricket Club only a month prior to his death. He died in Edinburgh on 13 November 2022 at age 69.
