= Perth County Cricket Club =

- Nickname: The Big County

Personnel
- Captain: Graham Ferguson (last)

Team information
- City: Perth, Scotland
- Colours
- Founded: 1826; 200 years ago
- Dissolved: 2009; 17 years ago
- Home ground: North Inch

History
- Scottish County Championship wins: 29
- Scottish Cup wins: 2
- Official website: Perth CCC (Archived from original)

Perth County Cricket Club, commonly known as Perthshire, was a cricket club based in Perth. Founded in 1826, it was one of the most successful sides in the country.

Nicknamed the Big County owing to the geographic size of its namesake, it won the Scottish County Championship a record 29 times, with their last win coming in 1978.

Perthshire developed a fierce rivalry with neighbouring county side Forfarshire, often described as the Scottish equivalent of the Roses Match. During one such game in 1903 at its historic home ground, the North Inch, a stand collapsed, injuring over 150 people.

In 2009, in part due to vandalism of the North Inch, as well as long-term financial troubles after the 1993 Perth flood, the club was dissolved.

In 2012, three years after Perthshire's demise, plans were approved to merge the remaining cricket clubs in the city and create a unified club called Perth Doo'cot, named after the cricket ground chosen to host the new team's games.
