= List of Scottish cricket and football players =

This is a list of sportsmen who have played both first-class cricket and professional football in Scotland or England. The list includes four sportsmen who are dual internationals, having represented Scotland's national team at both sports.

== List of Scottish cricket and football players ==
=== Dual internationals ===
| Name | Cricket club/team | Football club/team | Ref | Notes |
|---|---|---|---|---|
| John Macdonald | Scotland | Scotland | | The first sportsman to represent Scotland at both sports. Won his cricket cap first. |
| Scot Symon | Scotland | Dundee; Portsmouth; Rangers; Scotland | | Won his cricket cap first |
| Donald Ford | Scotland | Heart of Midlothian; Falkirk; Scotland | | Won his football cap first |
| Andy Goram | Scotland | Oldham Athletic; Hibernian; Rangers; Notts County; Sheffield United; Motherwell; Manchester United; Hamilton Academical; Coventry City; Queen of the South; Elgin City; Scotland | | Won his football cap first |

=== Scotland cricket team / Professional football ===
| Name | Cricket club/team | Football club/team | Ref | Notes |
|---|---|---|---|---|
| Jim Souness | Scotland | Hibernian; Falkirk; Heart of Midlothian | | |
| Len Dudman | Scotland | Falkirk; Forfar Athletic | | |
| Harry Johnston | Scotland; Aberdeenshire; Uddingston | Montrose; Partick Thistle; Stenhousemuir | | |

== See also ==
- List of English cricket and football players
