= King James VI Golf Club =

Coordinates: 56.3886°N 3.4236°W

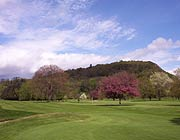
King James VI Golf Club

King James VI Golf Club, located in Perth, Scotland, is a private golf course also open to visitors. The River Tay setting is notable as it is the country's only self-contained course on a river island. The Island course is only accessible by foot by a side-walk on the side of a train bridge crossing the River Tay.

Founded in 1858 nearby at Perth's North Inch, then relocated to Moncreiffe Island in 1897, and a purpose-built course designed by 'Old' Tom Morris, the legendary winner of multiple British Open Championships.

The club is currently captained by Roger Gordon, with Allan Knox the resident professional.

== History ==
The origins of golf in Perth are obscure, as they are for the rest of Scotland, but it is likely they date to the fifteenth century. National bans on golf and football, designed to promote the practise of archery, were made in 1458, 1471 and 1491. In 1502, the first recorded purchase of golf equipment, a set of golf clubs costing thirteen shillings, was made by king James IV from a bow-maker in Perth.

The club takes its name from the tradition that King James VI of Scotland (1566–1625), who was later crowned King James I of England and Ireland, had as a boy learned to play golf on Perth's Inches (inch from the Gaelic innse meaning island).

Golf was played on both Inches to begin with, but players began to favour the North Inch, and by about 1850 no-one played golf on the South Inch.

The King James VI Golf Club was established in 1858. In 1860, what is believed to be the first inter-club golf match ever played took place when "King Jimmy" took on the Elie and Earlsferry Golf Club, which had also been founded in 1858. In 1884 a team from King James VI took part in the first inter-club golf match played in Ireland, against the Royal Belfast Club. King James members later set up some holes on a barren stretch of coastline near the village of Portrush, and were the first to play on what is now a world-famous links course.

King James VI shared the 10-hole North Inch course with various other local golf clubs until 1897, when it migrated to its current setting on Moncreiffe Island. The new course was laid out by the famous St Andrews professional, Old Tom Morris (1821–1908), a four-time winner of the British Open in the 1860s and prolific course designer. He was noted for incorporating natural features such as walls, burns and heather into his designs, and players of his new Island course had to contend with many mounds and banks as well as some trees and bunkers.

In March 1955 the old, wooden clubhouse was burned to the ground despite the heroic efforts of the local fire brigade to get fire-fighting equipment over to the site. This was a devastating blow, which destroyed many of the records and trophies from the early days of KJVI's history, to say nothing of valuable equipment belonging to individual members and the club.

The present day club house occupies the same site.

Brian Grieve is perhaps the club's most notable player. Brian joined the club in 1958, and has had a fantastic career in amateur golf.

His wins include:

- At King James VI: 18 Matchplay championships over 5 decades (1969–2001) and 17 Strokeplay Championships;
- At Blairgowrie: 3 Club Championships and 4 Senior Championships;
- Perth and Kinross titles: Matchplay Championship 3 times, Stroke Play Championship 3 times, Champion of Champions 6 times. Perth City Championship 6 times;
- He has held 6 course records, including the Island and Lansdowne;
- He has won 38 Open titles, and 44 Senior Opens since becoming a Senior in 2002;
- Brian has been a member of the Scottish Seniors International Team since 2003.
