= Tay Viaduct =

Bridge in Perth, Scotland

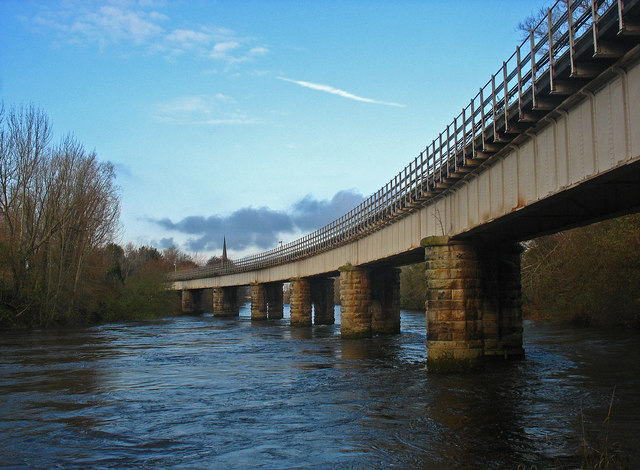
- The southern side of the bridge's curve
- Coordinates: 56.3920°N 3.4238°W
- Carries: Scottish Central Railway
- Crosses: River Tay
- Locale: Perth and Kinross
- Other name: West Railway Bridge

Characteristics
- Material: Iron and stone
- Total length: 440 metres (1,440 ft)

History
- Designer: Benjamin Hall Blyth; Francis Freeman & Lee
- Opened: 1864 (162 years ago)

Location
- Interactive map of Tay Viaduct

The Tay Viaduct, also known as the West Railway Bridge, is a single-track railway viaduct in Perth, Perth and Kinross, Scotland. It is around 440 m (1,440 ft) long. It carries the Scottish Central Railway, via a pronounced curve, across the River Tay to and from Perth railway station, 0.5 mi (800 m) to the west. Built in 1864, the work of London's Francis Freeman & Lee, it replaced an earlier double-track timber viaduct dating from 1849. The first pier of today's structure is for a double track, but the line is now single.

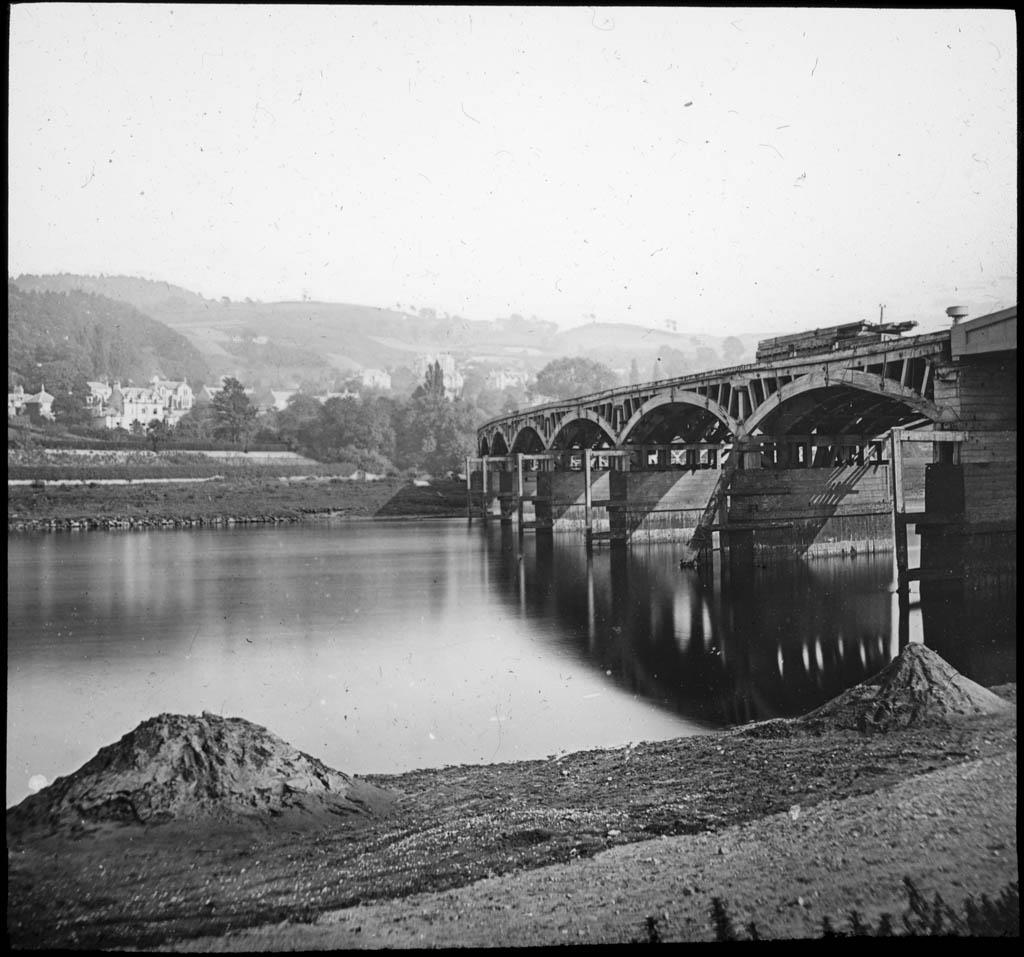
The original bridge, looking towards Barnhill on the eastern side of the river, pictured around 1849

The viaduct has seven iron girder spans on the city side of the river, ten stone arches on Moncreiffe Island, and six iron girder spans to the east of Moncreiffe Island. The earlier bridge had 25 arches and an iron swing bridge.

The bridge has two spans across the Tay from Perth: the first is to Moncreiffe Island; the second is from Moncreiffe Island to Barnhill on the river's eastern banks.

It has a pedestrian walkway on the outer edge of its curve. The curve is less severe than its predecessor's was. The current structure has seventeen chains.

== Gallery ==
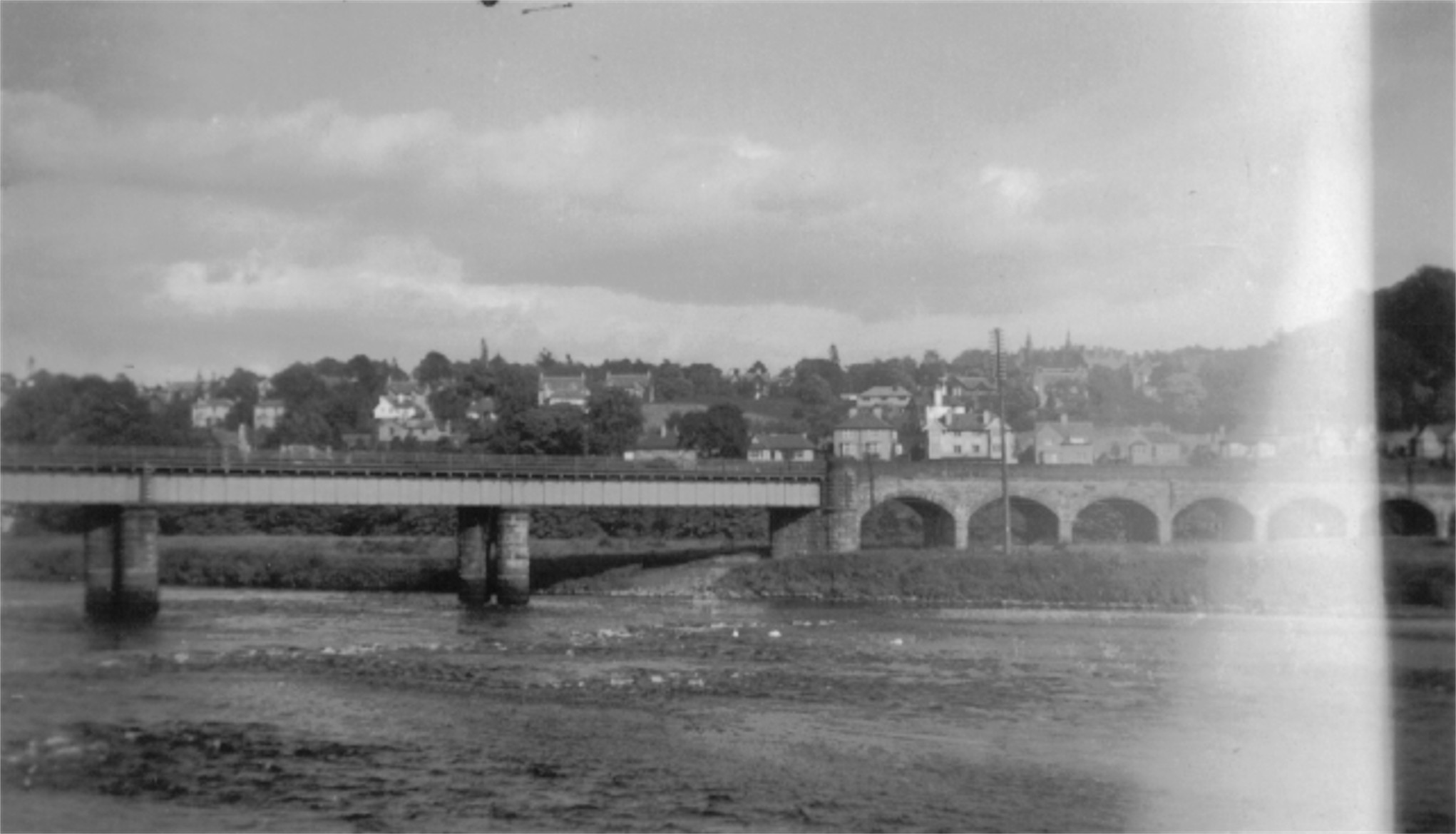
The bridge in 1925, looking towards Kinnoull

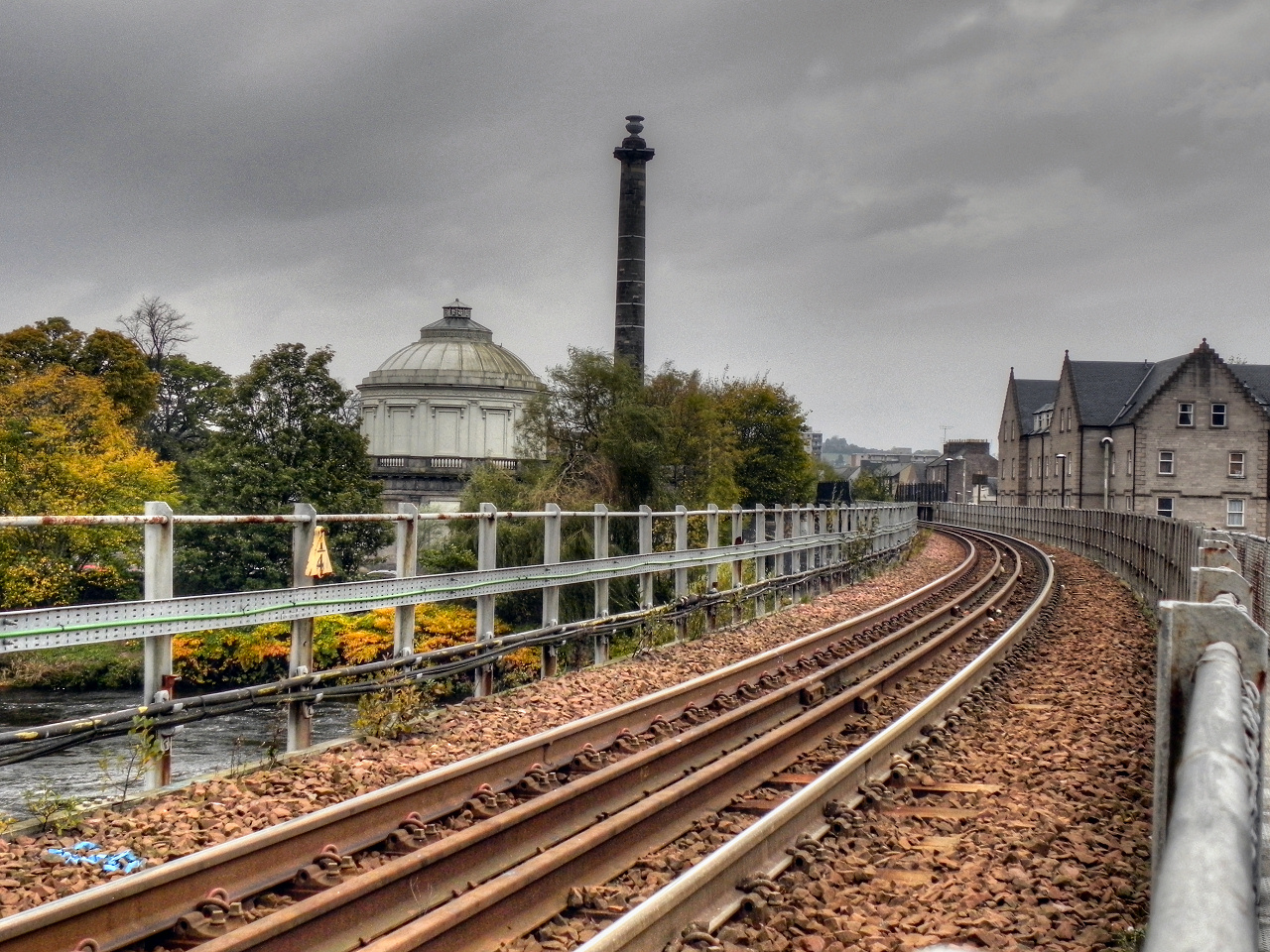
Looking west to Perth Water Works (left) from the first span across the Tay, 2011

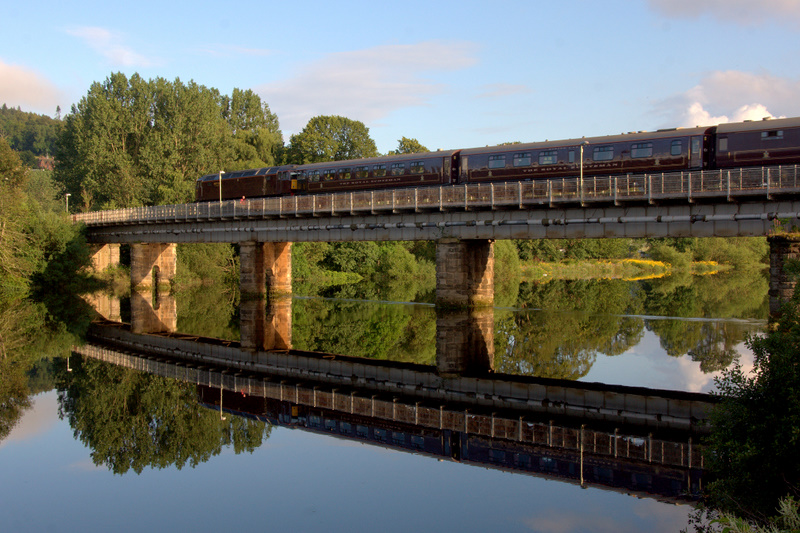
The Royal Scotsman crossing the bridge between Barnhill and Moncreiffe Island, 2011

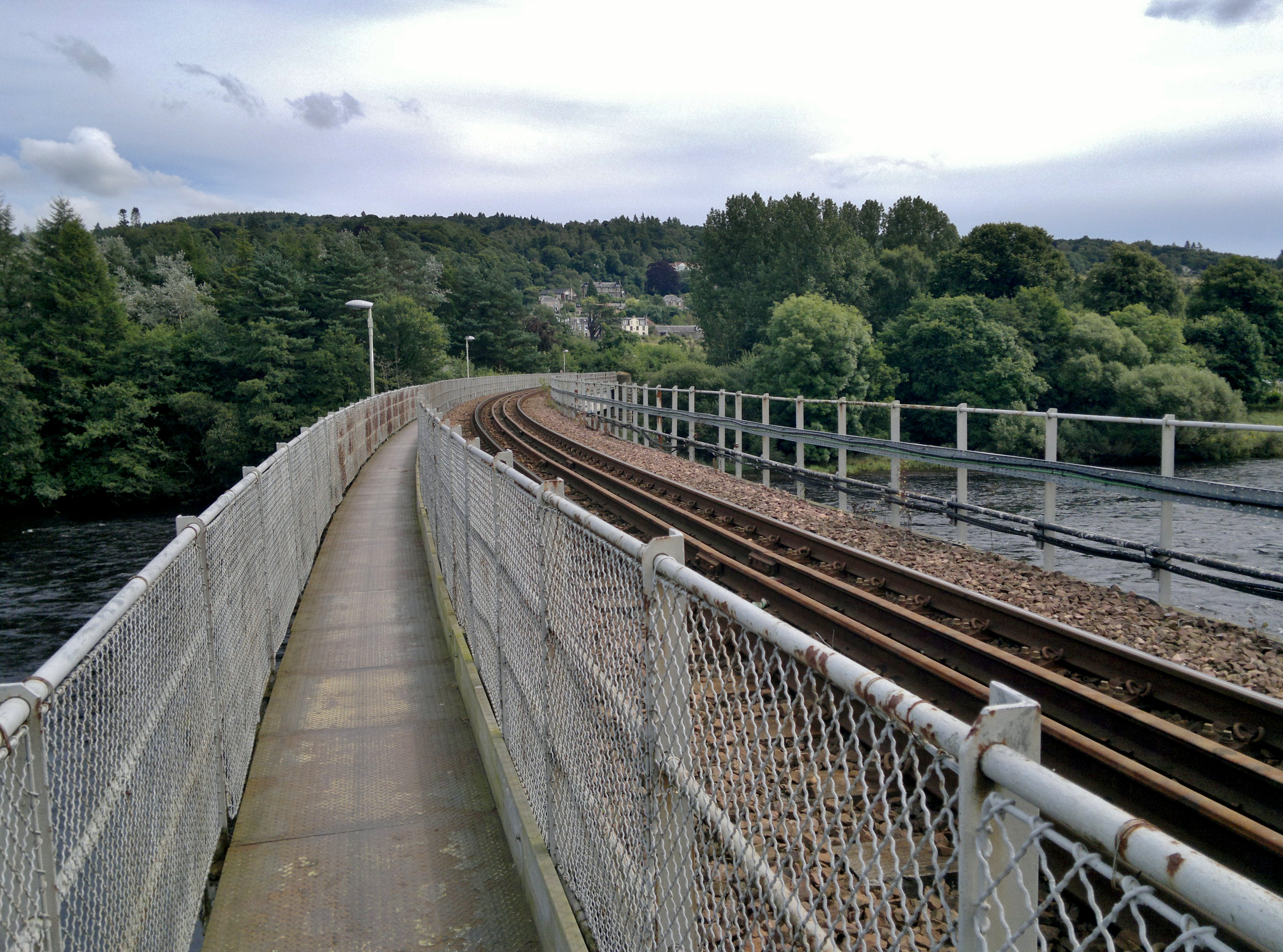
Looking east to Moncreiffe Island and, beyond, Barnhill, 2012

== See also ==
- List of bridges in Scotland
