= 1814 Perth flood =

1814 disaster in Perth, Scotland

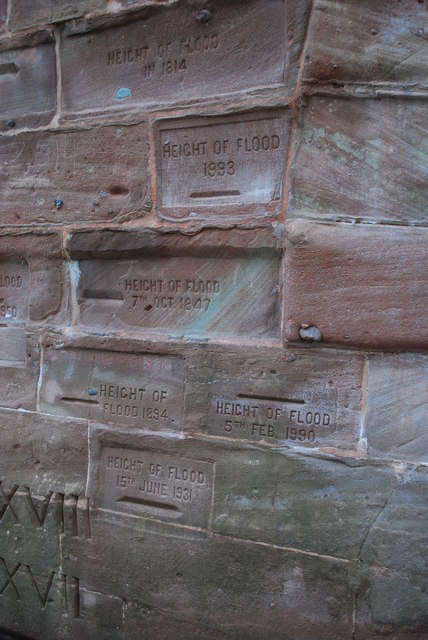
- Flood water levels inscribed into Smeaton's Bridge, which spans the River Tay at Perth
- Date: 12 February 1814 (212 years ago)
- Location: Perth, Scotland

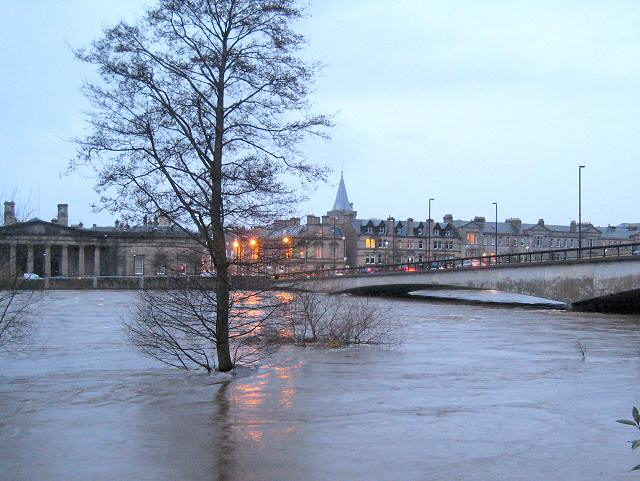
Another high level of the Tay's water, this time in 2008

The 1814 Perth flood was caused by the River Tay, Scotland's longest river, rising to 7 metres (23 feet 0 inches) above its normal level. It occurred on 12 February 1814, in Perth, Scotland. It was partly caused by ice jams beneath Perth Bridge, which was built 43 years earlier. The river's height matched that of a flood in 1774.

Perth's 1993 flood came close to breaking the record for the height of the Tay's waters, but it peaked at 6.48 m (21.3 ft).
