= Perth Bridge =

Bridge in Perth, Scotland

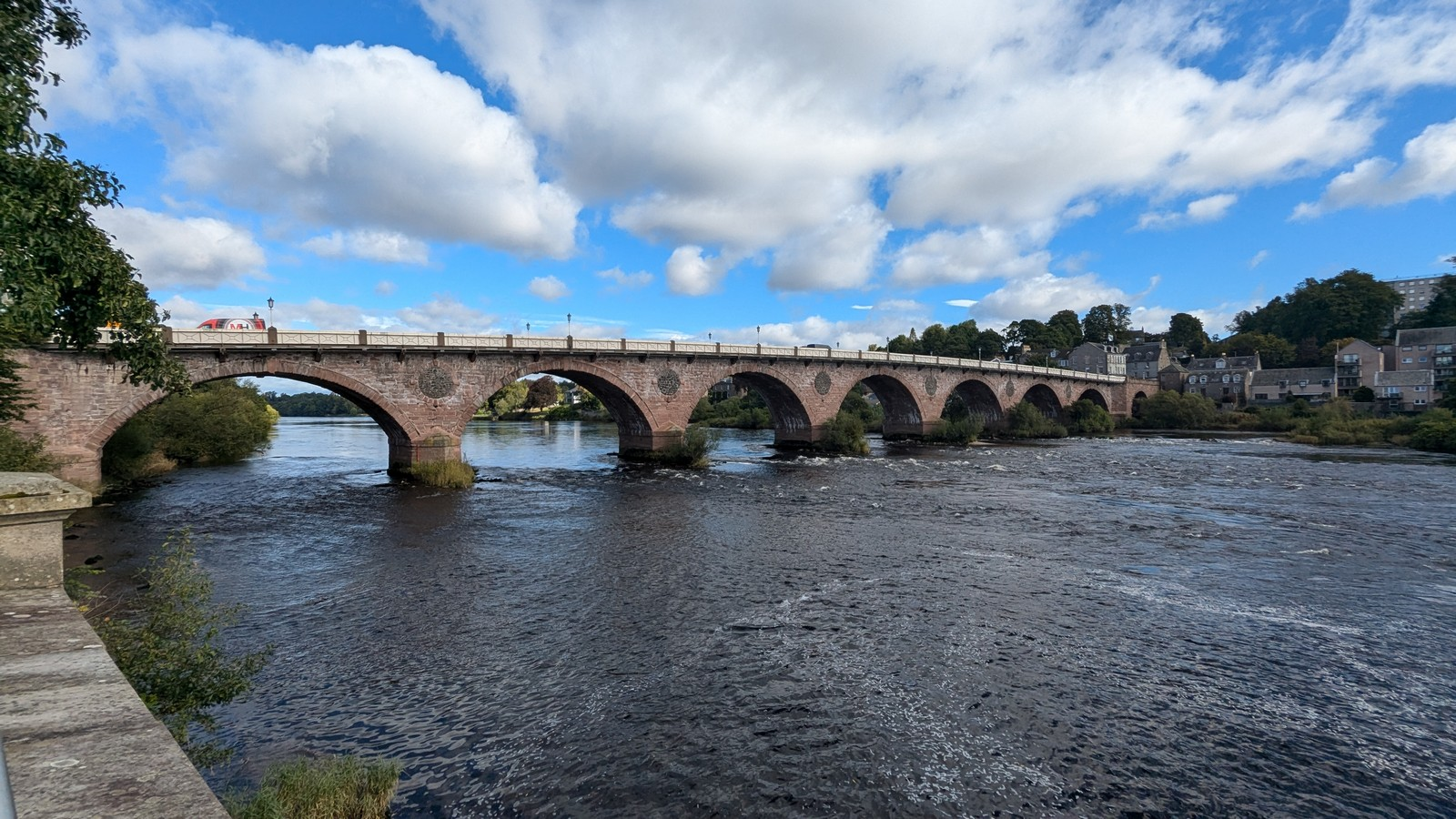
- Coordinates: 56.3990°N 3.4252°W
- Carries: A85
- Crosses: River Tay
- Locale: Perth
- Other names: Smeaton's Bridge; The Old Bridge; The Auld Brig
- Maintained by: Perth and Kinross Council

Characteristics
- Design: Arch

History
- Opened: 1771 (255 years ago)

Listed Building – Category A
- Official name: Perth Bridge Over River Tay
- Designated: 19 May 1965
- Reference no.: LB39339

Location
- Interactive map of Perth Bridge

Perth Bridge (also known as Smeaton's Bridge, locally, the Old Bridge, and in the local dialect of Scots, the Auld Brig) is a toll-free bridge in the city of Perth, Scotland. A Category A listed structure, it spans the River Tay, connecting Perth, on the western side of the river, to Bridgend, on its eastern side, carrying both automotive and pedestrian traffic of West Bridge Street (the A85). An earlier bridge was demolished at the same location in 1621 (its location marked by a stone tablet at the bottom of the High Street), and many unsuccessful attempts were made to replace it. A subscription was started by James VI and several noblemen to help with the construction cost, but the king's death in 1625 suspended the scheme and a series of ferryboats were instead used.

The replacement bridge was completed in October 1771, which places it in the Georgian era (George Street, which leads up to the bridge from the city, was built at the same time); however, its plaque states the year in which construction began, 1766, as its "built" date. The engineer of its construction was John Smeaton, after whom the bridge is colloquially named.

Funded by Thomas Hay, 9th Earl of Kinnoull, the government, and public subscription, the bridge was put to the test three years after its completion. In February 1774, during a quick thaw, broken ice became wedged under the arches and created a natural dam. Large sections of Perth, including the North Inch and South Inch, were flooded. The bridge, however, stood firm. It has survived many subsequent floods, and marks documenting these levels are visible on one of its piers.

An increase in traffic resulted in the bridge being widened in 1869 by A.D. Stewart. Its stone parapets were removed, and footpaths projected over iron brackets.

== Gallery ==
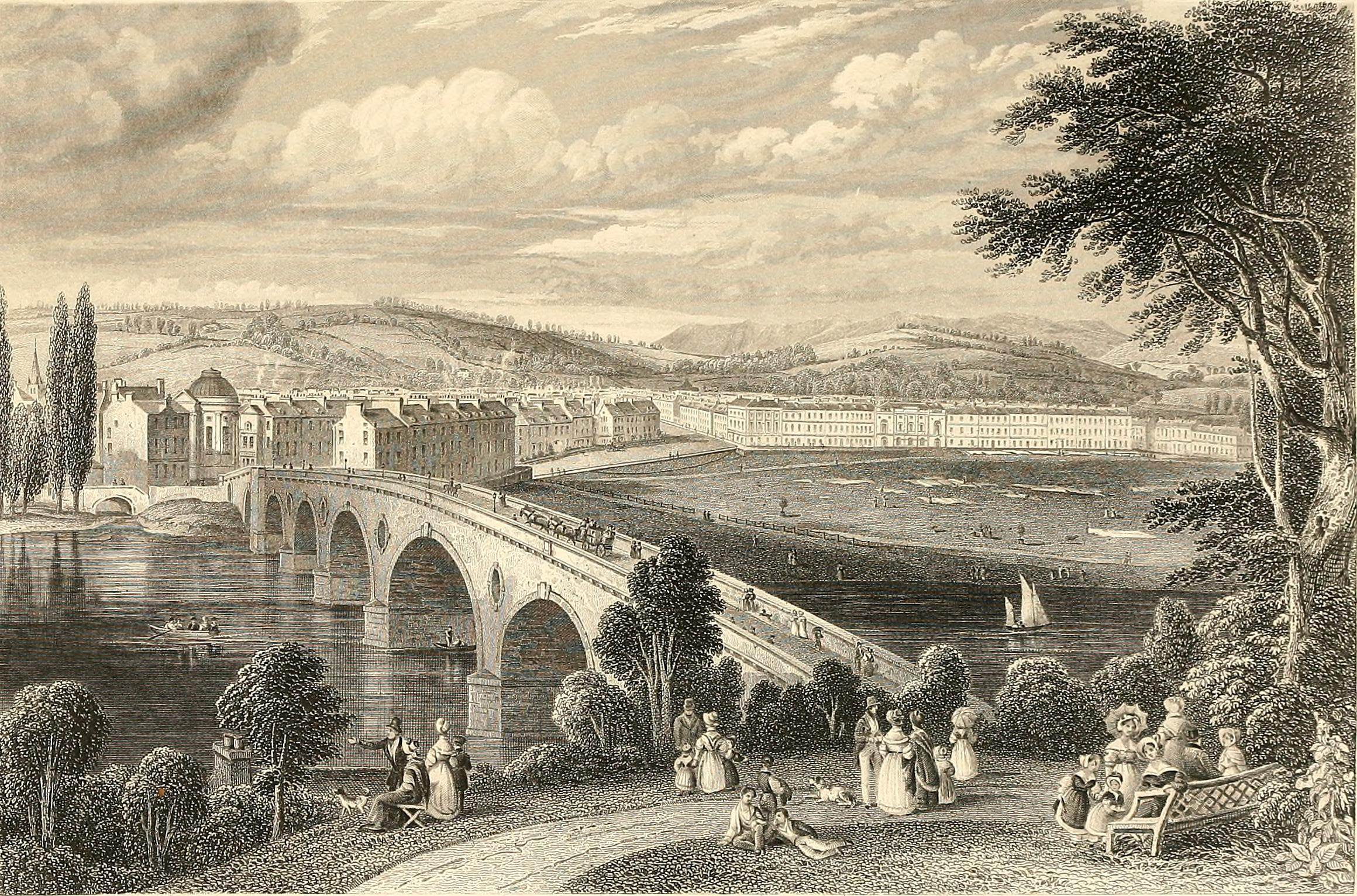
The bridge as it was before being widened in 1869

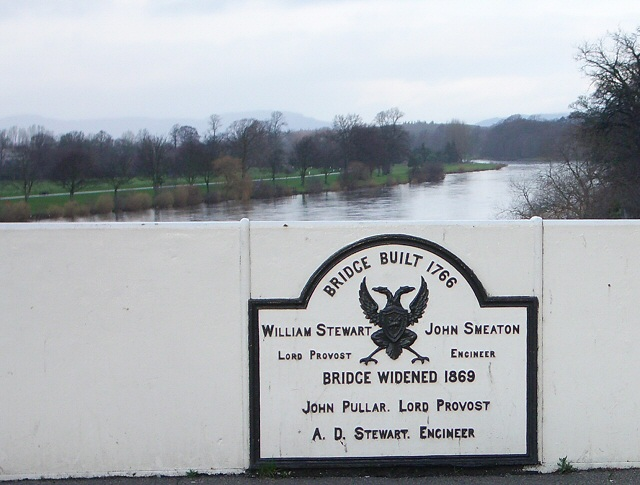
A plaque on the bridge

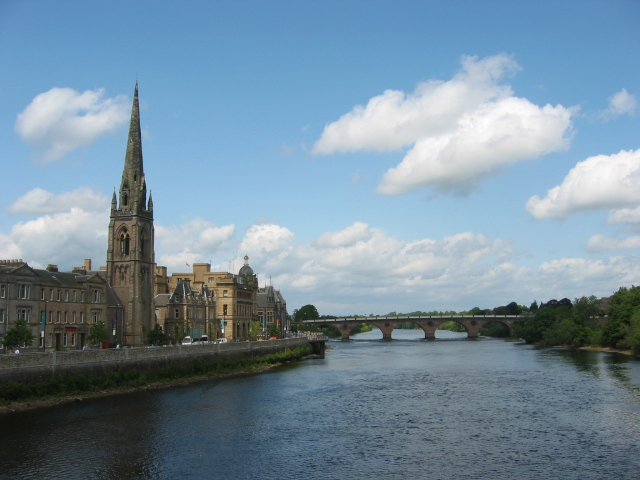
Smeaton's Bridge, with St Matthew's Church, on Tay Street, on the left, looking north from Queen's Bridge

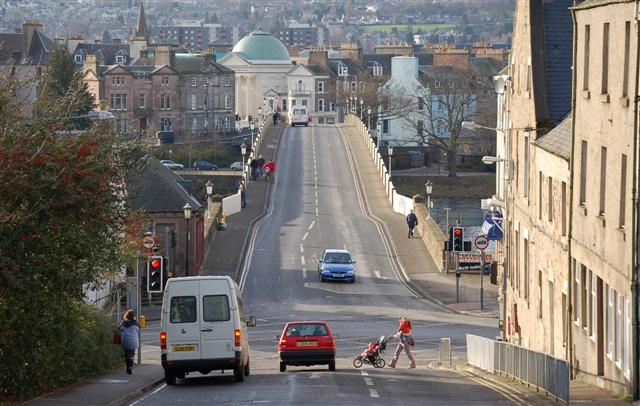
A view from Bridgend's East Bridge Street to West Bridge Street, which traverses the bridge

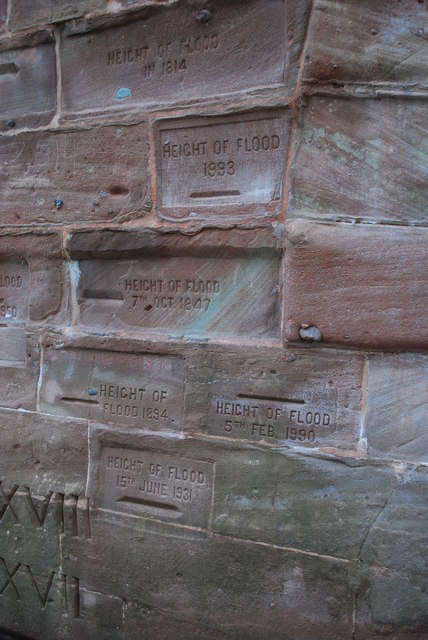
Flood water levels of the Tay etched into the bridge's brickwork

== See also ==
- List of Category A listed buildings in Perth and Kinross
- List of listed buildings in Perth, Scotland
- 1814 Perth flood
- 1993 Perth flood
