= John Macdonald (sportsman) =

Scottish footballer and cricketer

Personal information
- Date of birth: 24 December 1861
- Place of birth: Inverness, Scotland
- Date of death: 29 August 1938 (aged 76)
- Place of death: Edinburgh, Scotland
- Position: Centre half

Senior career*
Years	Team	Apps	(Gls)
- Edinburgh University
1884–1885	Queen's Park		

International career
1886	Scotland	1	(0)
Cricket career
Cricket information
International information
National side	Scotland (1880–1884)
Source: CricketArchive, 15 February 2018
- * Club domestic league appearances and goals

Dr. John Macdonald (24 December 1861 – 29 August 1938) was a Scottish sportsman who represented Scotland at both football and cricket, the first Scotsman to represent his country at both sports. He was also a qualified medical doctor.

== Early life ==
Macdonald was born in Inverness on 24 December 1861, the eldest of eight children. His father was a house painter, local magistrate, and town councillor, while his mother was the daughter of a local farmer. He attended Inverness Royal Academy where he played cricket, tennis, and rugby.

== Edinburgh University and cricket career ==
Macdonald attended the University of Edinburgh, graduating with a medical degree in 1884. He played for the University at cricket, and while a student he represented Scotland at cricket in a three-day international against the Australians in September 1880, at the age of 18. He also played for Scotland in an exhibition game against a group of American tourists, the Gentlemen of Philadelphia, in June 1884. He was captain of the University side throughout 1884 and scored over 1,000 runs that year. During his time at the university, he also switched from rugby football to association football. He captained the University's football team.

== Football career ==
Macdonald represented a Glasgow select side in 1885 in a 5–2 victory against a London select side at The Oval. He made one appearance for Scotland in March 1886, against England. In doing so he became the first Scotsman to represent his country at both cricket and football; it would be another 50 years before another sportsman (Scot Symon) represented Scotland at both sports. In that match he played as a left half, though he usually played as a "strong and capable centre-half." He also played as an amateur for Queen's Park, making 11 appearances.

== Later life and death ==
Macdonald returned to Inverness to set up a medical practice, and he eventually became Chief Medical Officer for both Inverness Burgh and Inverness County Council. He was married with five children. He continued his involvement in both cricket and football - captaining local team Northern Counties and representing a North of Scotland XI in the former, and becoming a Patron of the Highland League in 1932 in the latter. Macdonald died in Edinburgh on 29 August 1938, at the age of 76.
