= Statue of Albert, Prince Consort, North Inch =

Monument in Perth, Scotland

Statue of Albert, Prince Consort
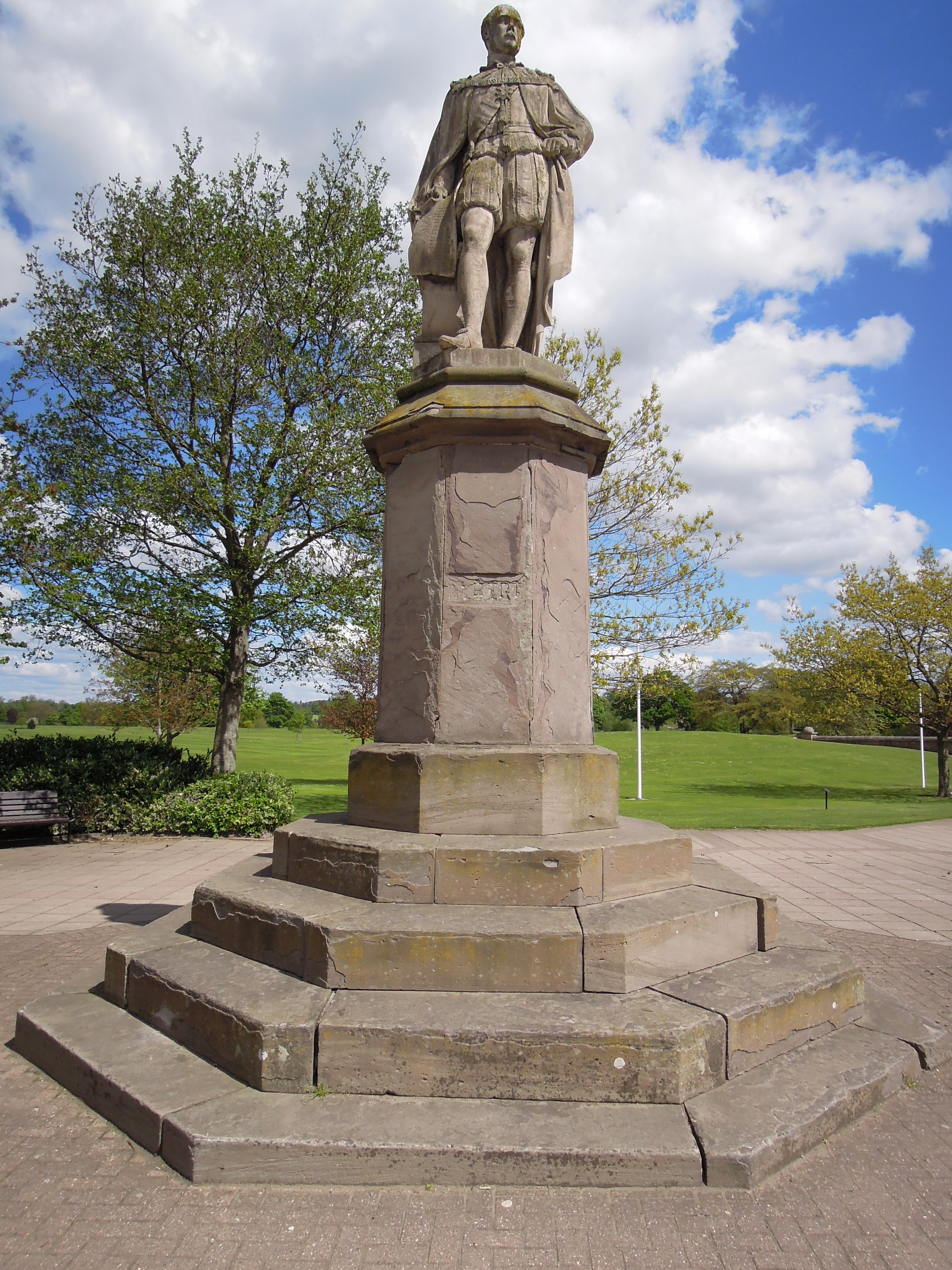
- The statue in 2013
- Interactive map of Statue of Albert, Prince Consort
- Location: North Inch; Perth, Perth and Kinross; Scotland
- Coordinates: 56.399115°N 3.428805°W
- Designer: William Brodie
- Type: Statue
- Material: Sandstone
- Height: 8 feet (2.4 m)
- Opening date: 30 August 1864; 161 years ago
- Dedicated to: Albert, Prince Consort

The Statue of Albert, Prince Consort, also known as The Albert Memorial, is a Category B listed monument at the North Inch public park in Perth, Perth and Kinross, Scotland. It is dedicated to Prince Albert of Saxe-Coburg and Gotha, husband of Queen Victoria.

The Queen unveiled the statue on 30 August, 1864, three years after Albert's death, on her way to Balmoral Castle. The couple and their children had stayed at the city's Royal George Hotel in 1848. It was their first time staying in a hotel, an occurrence prompted by their inability to stay at nearby Scone Palace because William Murray, 4th Earl of Mansfield, was out of town.

The statue was sculpted by William Brodie and stands 8 feet (2.4 m) tall. He is dressed in the robes of the Knight of the Thistle and holding a plan of the Crystal Palace. It faces south, onto Charlotte Street.

== Detail ==
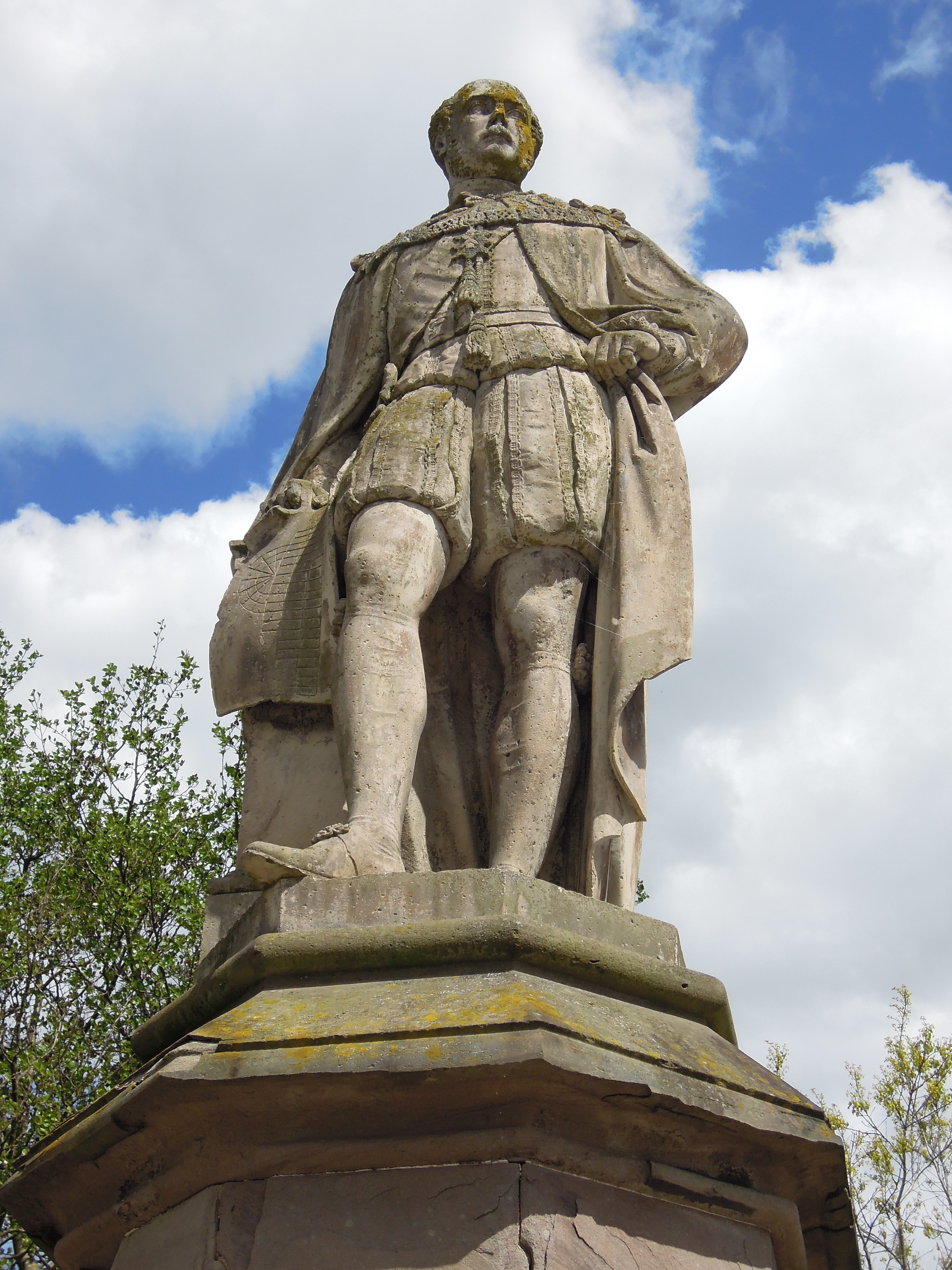
A closer view, showing the plan of the Crystal Palace in the subject's right hand

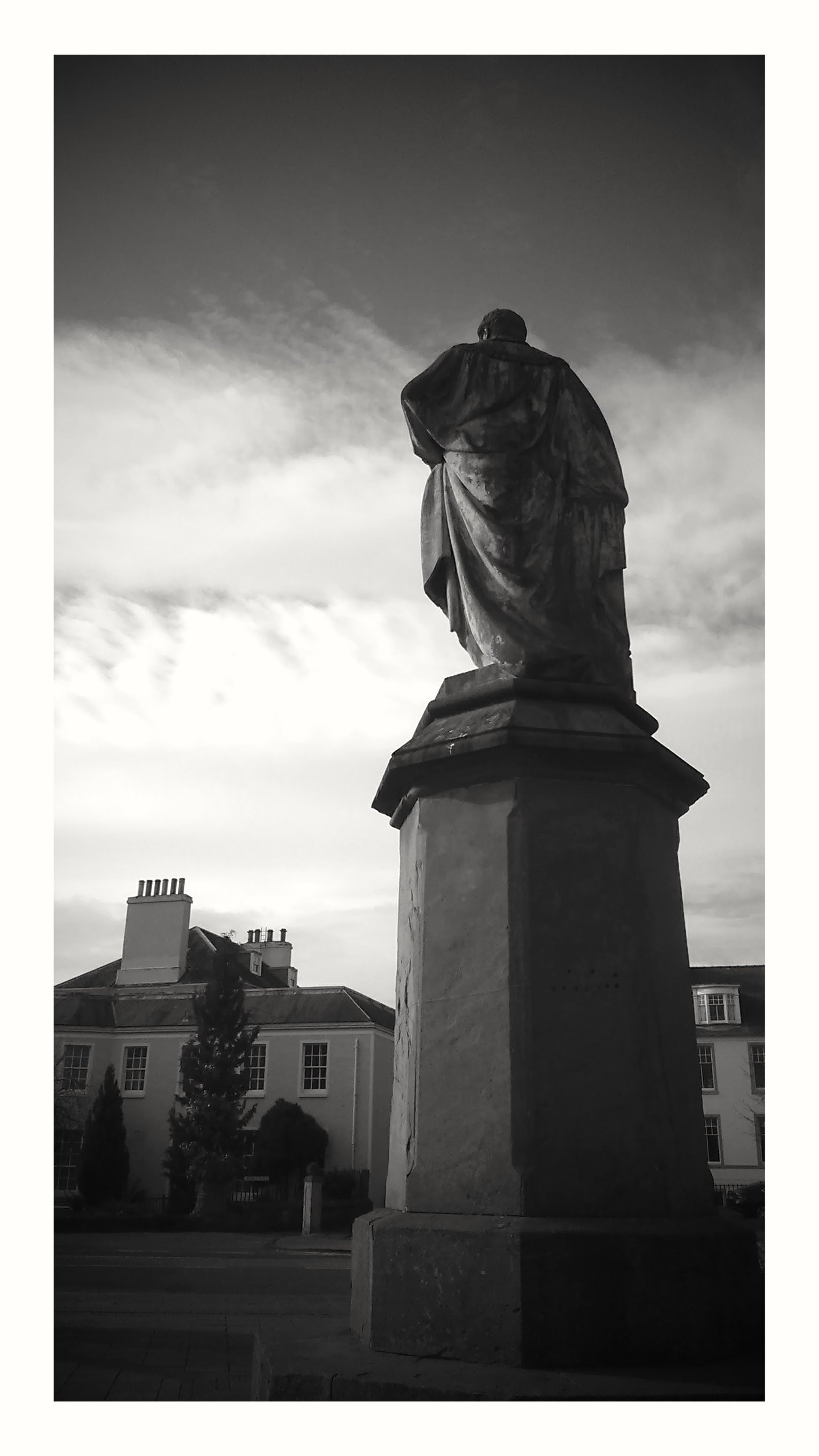
Rear of the statue

== See also ==
- List of listed buildings in Perth, Scotland
