= Harry Johnston (footballer, born 1949) =

Scottish footballer

- Born: Harry Grant Forsyth Johnston; 24 December 1949 (age 76); Kirkwall, Orkney, Scotland
Association football career
- Position: Midfielder
Youth career
- Lewis United
Senior career*
Years	Team	Apps	(Gls)
1970–1976	Montrose	182	(28)
1976–1978	Partick Thistle	14	(3)
1978–1979	→ Brechin City (loan)	17	(2)
1979–1982	Montrose	95	(11)
1982–1984	Stenhousemuir	33	(2)
1984–	Thorniewood United		
Total		341	(46)
- * Club domestic league appearances and goals
- Cricket career

Cricket information
- Batting: Left-handed
- Bowling: Slow left-arm orthodox

Domestic team information
- Years: Team
- 1974–1984: Scotland

Career statistics
Competition	First-class	List A
Matches	2	17
Runs scored	24	225
Batting average	8.00	15.00
100s/50s	0	0
Top score	12	30
Balls bowled	252	719
Wickets	3	6
Bowling average	28.66	71.33
5 wickets in innings	0	0
10 wickets in match	0	0
Best bowling	2/60	2/43
Catches/stumpings	0/–	4/–
- Source: Cricket Archive (subscription required), 19 March 2018

Harry Grant Forsyth Johnston (born 24 December 1949) is a Scottish retired footballer who played as a midfielder, featuring briefly in the country's top division for Partick Thistle between longer spells with Montrose. He is also a former cricketer who played first-class matches for Scotland in 1975 and 1981.

== Football career ==
=== First spell at Montrose ===
Born in Orkney and raised in Aberdeen, Johnston began his career with local Junior club Lewis United, from where he was signed by semi-professional Montrose, then playing in the lower of the two divisions of the Scottish Football League. He was brought in to the Gable Endies by player-manager Alex Stuart in 1970, around the same time as defenders Dennis D'Arcy and Les Barr arrived.

All would play important roles in the Links Park club's gradual improvement in fortunes, as they followed up a win in the 1972–73 Forfarshire Cup with a best-ever finish of 3rd in the 1974–75 Scottish Division Two campaign, just one point behind winners Falkirk. To finish near the top of the table was particularly important that year as the leagues were reconstructed, with only the top six being placed into the new 'First Division', which was actually the middle level between the Premier and the Second. Montrose also recorded their longest unbeaten league run of 15 matches, and set their record margin of victory with a 12–0 win over amateurs Vale of Leithen in the 1974–75 Scottish Cup.

The following year was even better, as Montrose finished 3rd again – but this time among stronger opposition – in the 1975–76 Scottish First Division. They also made it to the quarter-finals of the 1975–76 Scottish Cup, losing narrowly to eventual finalists Heart of Midlothian after two replays, and reached the semi-final of the 1975–76 Scottish League Cup, where they led for much of the tie against Rangers at Hampden Park before eventually succumbing 5–1 to the team who would lift the trophy.

=== Partick Thistle ===
The contribution of Johnston (who by now had successfully graduated from Jordanhill College to become a Physical education teacher) in Montrose's strong period had not gone unnoticed, and in summer 1976, after over 200 matches for the Angus club, he was approached by Partick Thistle, who had just achieved promotion to the Premier Division. the Jags manager Bertie Auld stated in his autobiography that he had to persuade Johnston to make the step up, as the player was unsure if he had the quality needed. After signing for a fee of £20,000, his spell with the Glasgow club was short, encompassing little more than one season due to injuries and a loss of trust from manager Auld, himself a combative character who eventually concluded that Johnston had been correct in his self-assessment of being not good enough for the top division, or at least not sufficiently confident in his own ability to make an impact.

However, the midfielder did contribute 14 league appearances to the team which finished 5th in the 1976–77 Scottish Premier Division, playing alongside the likes of Scottish internationals Alan Hansen, John Hansen and Alan Rough, as well as Jim Melrose and Doug Somner. He was in the team for Thistle's first win in the new Premier Division (beating Motherwell), and two of his three goals were scored against Rangers, one in a defeat at Ibrox and the other to open the scoring in a 4–3 win at Firhill, with the third strike a winner against Kilmarnock. After a period out injured and a loan to third tier Brechin City, Johnston returned to Montrose in 1979, with the club having just been relegated to the bottom division.

=== Return to Montrose and later years ===
Johnston spent three further seasons with Montrose and two with Stenhousemuir, who were playing at the same level and closer to his home and workplace in the Central Belt, amassing 128 further league appearances between the two clubs, before returning to the Juniors with Viewpark-based Thorniewood United in his mid-30s prior to retiring. He was made a member of the Montrose Hall of Fame upon its introduction in 2004.

== Cricket career ==
Johnston was also an accomplished cricketer, appearing at club level for Aberdeenshire in his early career and later for Uddingston and Fauldhouse Victoria. A skilled spin bowler and batter, he was selected for Scotland for first-class cricket matches against Ireland at Rathmines in August 1975, and against the same opposition at Clontarf in July 1981.

He also made the team for 17 List A matches: 16 in the Benson & Hedges Cup (between 1980, the first year Scotland entered a team, and 1984), plus one in the NatWest Bank Trophy in 1983.

The high-level appearance totals would almost certainly have been greater had Johnston not absented himself from cricket between 1976 and 1979 to concentrate on football.

== Personal life ==
Johnston became a secondary school PE teacher by profession; he had already embarked on this career when his profile as a footballer began to increase in his mid-20s, and spent many years teaching at Stonelaw High School in Rutherglen and John Street Secondary School in Bridgeton. He never became the department's principal teacher nor served as the school's football coach, those responsibilities falling to colleagues Alan Byrne and Iain Burns respectively, but was involved in youth cricket coaching.

== See also ==
- List of Scottish cricket and football players
