= Jim Souness =

Scottish cricketer and footballer

James McGill Souness (9 November 1928 – 2 September 1990) was a Scottish footballer and cricketer. Souness played for both of the Edinburgh derby rivals, Hibs and Hearts. An outside right, Souness was unable to break into the Hibs team ahead of Scotland international Gordon Smith although was involved in them winning the League in the 1950/51 season . He moved to Hearts in 1953 and helped the club win the 1954–55 Scottish League Cup. Souness retired from playing football soon afterwards, when he became a qualified actuary. He went on to become the president of the Faculty of Actuaries.

Souness played in three first class matches for the Scotland cricket team.

After retiring from competitive sport, Souness took to hill walking and succeeded in climbing all of the Scottish Munros. In September 1990, he was killed in a climbing accident on the Jungfrau mountain in Switzerland, the day after he retired. His sons witnessed the accident.

== See also ==
- List of Scottish cricket and football players
