= Friendville (manor house) =

Coordinates: 57°07′58″N 2°08′10″W

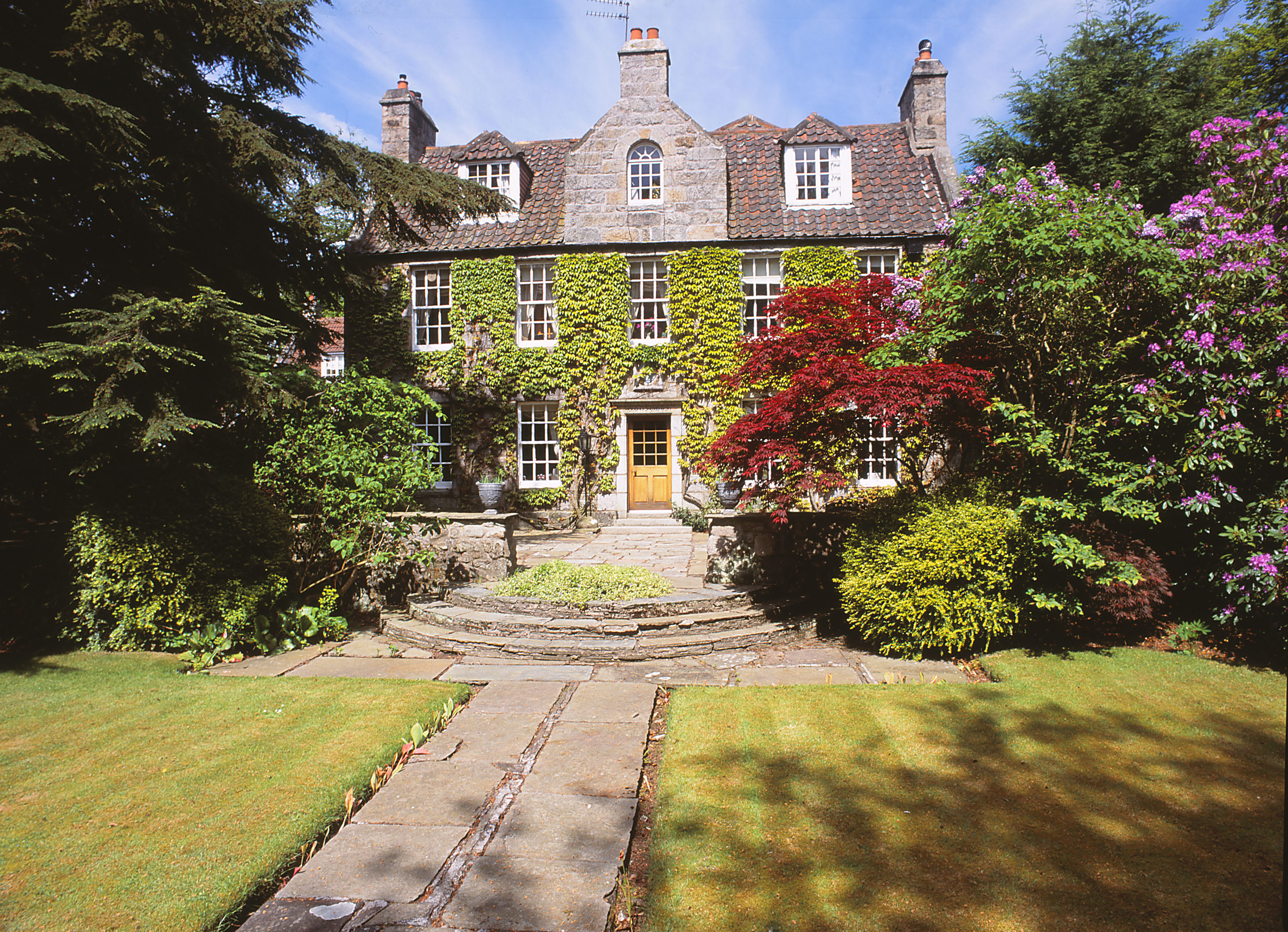
- Friendville House, Front

- Location of Dalmeny House in City of Aberdeen
- Location: Mannofield, Aberdeen, Scotland, United Kingdom

History
- Built: 1773
- Built for: Robert Balmanno

Site notes
- Architectural style: Georgian

Listed Building – Category B
- Designated: 12 January 1967
- Reference no.: LB20102

Friendville is a large manor house and estate in the Mannofield area of Aberdeen, Scotland, operated as a hireable exclusive use venue. It is notable for being situated in the city of Aberdeen itself yet containing an estate and gardens that are more commonly found in rural country houses. Friendville house is a category B listed building and the oldest residential property still in use in Aberdeen. It is one of Aberdeen's most valuable properties.

== History ==
Friendville was built for Robert Balmanno in 1773 in the area of land known at the time as Balmanno's Field which was acquired a year early by Balmanno from the Rubislaw Estate and cultivated as farmland. Friendville was built at the edge of this land as a private residence for Balmanno where he stayed until 1798, when the house was purchased by Arthur Dingwall Fordyce.

In the period between 1798 and 1952 Friendville changed hands a number of times but always remained a residential property, during this time large areas of the house were neglected and were allowed to deteriorate, particularly the grounds and the gardens of Friendville which became an eyesore in the affluent Mannofield neighborhood. In 1943 the estate was purchased by William Bell a well known antiques dealer in Aberdeen who undertook a project to restore Friendville.

Under the guidance of architect Fenton Wynness, the house and grounds were renovated in an attempt to bring the house back to its original standard whilst maintaining the Georgian architecture and Victorian interior.

== Architecture ==
Friendville house was built in the late 18th century before the mass expansion of the oil industry when Aberdeen was still sparsely populated and land was vast and relatively easily obtainable, as such Friendville was built as a country manor and the city of Aberdeen grew around it, particularly in the early 20th century as the oil industry grew to prominence.

The architectural style of Friendville reflects the freedom of the countryside, the house is built with eloquent Georgian masonry and the 2 acres of garden inside the grounds of Friendville are segregated as was common in the Victorian era. The interior also reflects Victorian design, containing wooden beams and a feature wooden staircase in the main hall.

== Present day ==
Today, Friendville operates as a commercial venue available for private hire. It is operated by Oakhill Apartments.
