= Mannofield =

Area of Aberdeen, Scotland

Coordinates: 57.13°N 2.135°W

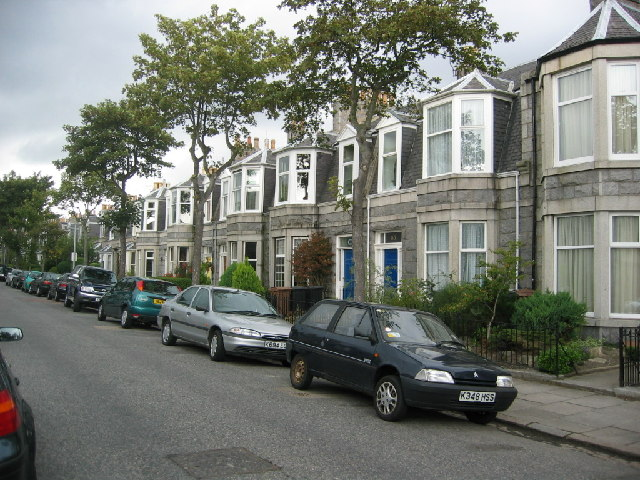

- Location within the Aberdeen City council area Location within Scotland
- Council area: Aberdeen City
- Lieutenancy area: Aberdeen
- Country: Scotland
- Sovereign state: United Kingdom
- Post town: ABERDEEN
- Postcode district: AB10, AB15
- Dialling code: 01224
- Police: Scotland
- Fire: Scottish
- Ambulance: Scottish
- UK Parliament: Aberdeen South
- Scottish Parliament: Aberdeen South and North Kincardine

Mannofield is an area of Aberdeen, Scotland. It is situated in the west end of the city and is accessible by travelling along the A93 Aberdeen–Perth road, the A92 south from Blackdog or north from Stonehaven and the A96 from Inverness (via the A90). Mannofield is also a short walking distance away from Aberdeen City Centre and has good road and bus links to the city and beyond. Much of Aberdeen's water is supplied by the water works/reservoir on St John's Terrace and the reservoir on Craigton Road.

== History ==
Robert Balmanno purchased part of the Aberdeen "Freedom Lands", formerly known as the Foul Moors, from the Rubislaw Estate in 1772 and proceeded to drain the marshy tract for farmland. His strawberries were said to be the best of the Scottish crop, and sold in Covent Garden in London. He built a large home, Friendville, near the edge of his estate (at Countesswells Road). A small community grew at the perimeter of Balmanno's Field, or Enclosure, the name thereafter evolving to Mannofield.

== Education ==
Mannofield is served in the primary sector by Airyhall Primary School, Broomhill Primary School and Cults Primary School. Secondary education is provided by Cults Academy, Harlaw Academy and Hazlehead Academy.

== Cricket ==
Mannofield has been the home of Aberdeenshire Cricket Club since 9 May 1890, with the club playing at Mannofield Park. The ground has been host to many great cricketing names over the years, most notably Sir Donald Bradman, who scored his last first class century on British soil at the ground in 1948. In the modern era the ground has become one of Scotland's finest and has the ability to stage One Day International games between nations.

== Scout group ==
Mannofield's local scout group is the 9th Aberdeen and local Explorer Group is Mannofield Explorers – in addition to the 1st City of Aberdeen Scout Troop on Forest Avenue Lane.
