= Ronald Chisholm =

Scottish cricketer

Personal information
- Born: 22 May 1927; Aberdeen, Scotland
- Died: 23 November 2006 (aged 79)
- Batting: Right-handed
- Bowling: Leg-break/Googly

Career statistics
Competition	First-class
Matches	61
Runs scored	2,354
Batting average	23.54
100s/50s	1/11
Top score	105
Balls bowled	1,544
Wickets	26
Bowling average	32.26
5 wickets in innings	0
10 wickets in match	0
Best bowling	4/9
Catches/stumpings	18/0
- Source: CricketArchive

Ronald Harry Eddie Chisholm (22 May 1927 – 23 November 2006) was a Scottish cricketer who holds the Scottish record for most first class appearances.

Chisholm's only career century was made against Ireland in 1970 and he once took 5 for 57 against the MCC at Lord's. He made 15,870 runs in club cricket.
