= 1993 Perth flood =

1993 disaster in Perth, Scotland

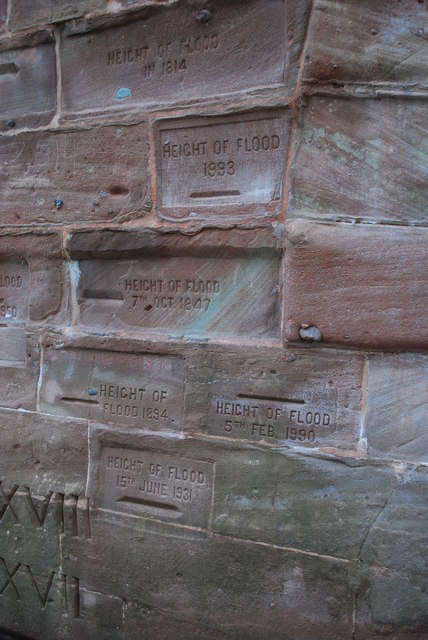
- Flood water levels inscribed into Smeaton's Bridge, which spans the River Tay at Perth
- Date: 17 January 1993 (33 years ago)
- Location: Perth, Scotland

The 1993 Perth flood (also known as the Great Tay Flood) was caused by the River Tay, Scotland's longest river, rising to 6.48 m (21 ft 3 in) above its normal level, with a flow of 2,268 m^{3}/s (80,100 cu ft/s). It occurred on 17 January 1993, in Perth, Scotland, after heavy snowfall, from blizzards experienced six days earlier, had melted. The flood almost broke the record for the height of the Tay's waters (set in 1814, when it rose 7 m (23 ft) above normal). A flood had occurred three years earlier, in February 1990, but the peak flow of the 1993 event was estimated to have been around 30% higher.

An estimated 50 square kilometres (19 sq mi) of farmland was flooded, along with large-scale damage to residential and commercial properties. Over 1,500 people had to abandon their homes.

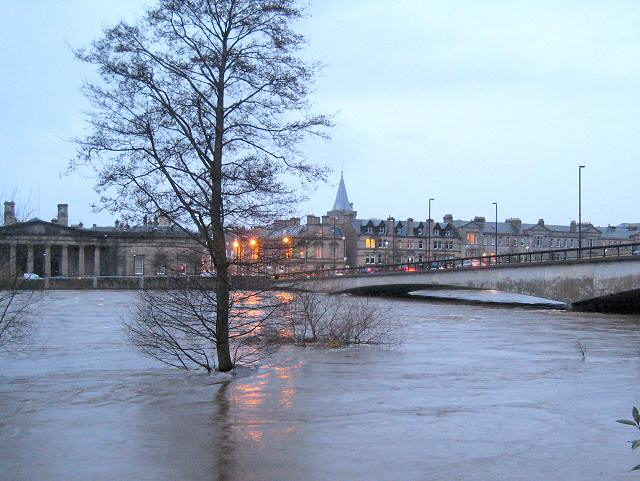
Another high level of the Tay's water, this time in 2008

The flood caused damage amounting to around £10 million. The city installed flood defences, which were completed in 2001, at a cost of around £25 million.
