= Aberdeenshire Cricket Club =

Aberdeenshire C.C.

Personnel
- Captain: Lewis Munro

Team information
- City: Aberdeen
- Colours
- Founded: 1857
- Home ground: Mannofield Park
- Capacity: 6,000

History
- SNCL 1st Tier wins: 2
- Scottish County Championship wins: 19 (including 2 shared)
- Scottish Cup wins: 2
- Official website: Aberdeenshire CC

Aberdeenshire CC is the largest cricket club based in Aberdeen, Scotland. Their ground, Mannofield Park, is located in the Mannofield area of Aberdeen, and was granted One Day International (ODI) status for the first time in 2008. The club has around 800 social and playing members and the current president is Clark Cameron.

Aberdeenshire Cricket Club currently has Four senior teams (Strathmore Union, Aberdeen Grade 1, Grade 2, Grade 4) and a host of junior teams (Softball Cricket, U11, U12, U13, U14, U15, U16, U17 and U18 . The current Junior Lead Coach , is ICC Level 3 , 3-time Scottish Cup winning Coach , Mr Phil).

== History ==
Although teams played as "Aberdeenshire" as early as 1848, the birth of Aberdeenshire Cricket Club took place in April 1857 at a public meeting held in "The Aberdeen Hotel". The £60 raised then enabled the founding spirit, James Forbes Lumsden, to lease and prepare a cricket ground at Queen's Cross to be called the Albyn Place Ground. Within two seasons the club was established enough to entertain Grange C.C. and to employ its first professional: Harry Lillywhite.

The growth of Aberdeen soon brought the end of the lease at Queen's Cross but by July 1867, James Forbes Lumsden had repeated the earlier exercise of leasing and laying out a cricket ground, this time in Broomhill and at a cost of £245. Over the following twenty three years the Holburn Ground as it was called, enabled Aberdeenshire Cricket Club to establish itself as a top club both locally and beyond. However, by the 1880s the continuing expansion of the town coupled with the fragility of having just an annual lease prompted the aforesaid James Forbes Lumsden, still Club Captain and Secretary (as well as being a respected lawyer), to seek to purchase a ground. Land at Mannofield was chosen, purchased (for £1105), laid out (for £483) and on May 9, 1890, was opened with a game against "The Gentlemen of Edinburgh". The financing of Mannofield was organised and, not a little funded, by James Williams (a whisky blender in Aberdeen and who probably played more games for Aberdeenshire in the 19th century than anyone else) and by his brother Sir Robert Williams, (an engineer who made a fortune in the goldfields of South Africa and who made his fame by building the railway for Cecil Rhodes from Southern Rhodesia - Zimbabwe to-day - to Angola).

The confidence brought by ownership of Mannofield enabled the club to attract the top teams to Aberdeen and, now under the guiding hand of Secretary W. Kendall Burnett (another successful lawyer), to push towards a Scottish Cricket Competition. The Scottish Counties Championship commenced in 1902, and, in the following year, in dramatic circumstances, Aberdeenshire won its first SC Championship. The Mannofield XI (at that time termed the "occasional" side) entered the already well established local league and cup competitions in1908 and within two seasons won the District League.

In 1912, the club, needing to engender more income, through a bar and better members’ facilities, decided to replace the old clubhouse. (It had been transferred from the Holburn Ground). It was completed just in time for the outbreak of World War 1. Cricket ceased at Mannofield and, by 1918, the ground had been turned into sheep pasture! Club membership dropped to 2 and the bank fearing for its loan on the new and almost unused Clubhouse threatened closure. Once more, and after 60 years of service to Aberdeenshire CC, James Forbes Lumsden saw the Club out of the near disaster of impending insolvency.

On the pitch the 1920s were highly successful for Aberdeenshire, but some management over-optimism and, at that time, a very high Entertainment Tax, once more threatened the club's future. This time, the ClubChairman, C.W.Mackie (a merchant in tropical products from Ceylon (Sri Lanka)) organised what turned out to be an incredibly successful "bazaar" to the extent that, for the first time since the Holburn days, Aberdeenshire had no debt. This enabled the club to gradually acquire land on the north side as it became available; to seriously develop junior cricket; and, reaping the rewards of the latter, to have a Mannofield XI strong enough to join, and quickly become, a major force in the Strathmore Union. The 2nd World War did not cause cricket to cease, and with a modified competition being organised locally, Mannofield became the home of several forces teams as well as the Mannofield side. When cricket returned to normal in 1946, the club entered a period of unparalleled success with Aberdeenshire winning the Scottish Counties Championship for four consecutive seasons and the Mannofield XI winning the Strathmore Union in 1949.

In 1957, the club celebrated its centenary with a game against Surrey (then the English Counties Champions). The occasion was also marked by Sir John Hay, (who was then managing director of Guthrie Bros, rubber producers in Malaya - now Malaysia) and also President of Surrey C.C., setting up a large trust fund for the benefit of Aberdeenshire C.C., the club he had attended as a youngster. The benefits of his generosity are still evident at Mannofield fifty years on.

Twenty six years without a Counties Championship was ended in 1975 and this success was to herald a quarter of a century of outstanding achievement within the club. The existing clubhouse (of 1912 vintage) was enlarged and the interior totally renewed; the "old" tearoom (from 1920) was revamped to become The Cavalier Bar: and then a snooker room was added. The committee's boldness was soon justified when the membership rose from around 175 to over 800 within three years. (This latter number has continued to the present day).

In the 1990s the club undertook two more major developments. Office and flat accommodation at the corner of the ground was purchased with a view to diversifying the club's income. Then it was decided to replace the Cavalier Bar with a much larger and better equipped function area to allow larger functions and company training days to also broaden the club's income base. The name Bradman Suite was chosen for the development to mark the occasion, when, at Mannofield, almost exactly fifty years earlier, Sir Donald Bradman had led the 1948 Australian touring side, and scored his last century in Britain a 2-day match which did not have first class status. On the playing front the period was also one of great success. Founded on a well-run and stable coaching set-up which produced a stream of good players, the Scottish Counties Championship was won regularly, the Scottish Cup was won in 1986 and 1996, and, when the first "Scottish Cricket League" was started, Aberdeenshire triumphed in the first season (1996).

Into the 21st century the club continues to develop, celebrated its 150th year in 2007 and in 2008 Mannofield became a fully accredited I.C.C. one-day-international ground.

At the 2008 Lloyds TSB Scotland SNCL awards, Aberdeenshire received the Magners Club of the Year Award in addition to the flag as Division 1 winners. Ken McCurdie also received the Groundsman of the Year, in recognition of his efforts in connection with the staging of One-Day Internationals at Mannofield for the first time.

Aberdeenshire featured in Sky Sports 'Clublife' series during the 2008 summer of England Test matches. The show saw the team coached by Ian Botham before featuring in, and eventually win, a Twenty20 tournament in Windsor.

Season of 2009 was a historic season in Aberdeenshire Cricket Club's history. The club won the SNCL Premier League and the Scottish Cup. This was the first time in 13 years since the club won a league and cup double, and the 1st time in its history since it has won the SNCL Premier League.

== Internationals ==
Year	Name	Caps
1999	C. J. O. Smith	186
1999	D. J. Cox	14
1995	N. J. MacRae	33
1994	C. J. Mearns	3
1992	K. Thomson	53
1989	D. H. Johnston	1
1987	M. J. Smith	73
1986	A. Bee	28
1985	N. W. Burnett	17
1984	J. D. Knight	12
1983	D. N. DeNeef	13
1980	D. L. Hays	3
1980	D. G. Moir	16
1978	W. A. Donald	57
1974	H. G. F. Johnston	28
1973	G. Angus	1
1973	D. B. S. Brown	19
1971	F. Robertson	44
1953	J. C. Richardson	2
1948	F. Findlay	3
1948	R. H. E. Chisholm	80
1947	T. A. Findlay	2
1947	G. W. Youngson	25
1938	A. V. Hunt	2
1936	G. T. Forbes	5
1932	J. D. Mortimer	3
1921	G. W. A. Alexander	13
1912	R. S. Clark	4
1909	W. A. Webster	4

== 1st XI players ==
Name	Nat	Batting Style	Bowling Style	Notes
Batsmen
Ewan Davidson	(Scotland)	RHB	-	
Marcus Vila	(Scotland)	RHB	RL	
Clark Cameron	(Qatar)	RHB	-	
Jack Lambley	(Scotland)	RHB	RFM	
Rutwick Hegde	(Scotland)	RHB	RO	
All-rounders
Lewis Munro	(Scotland)	RHB	RF	Captain
Ranga Bandara	(Scotland)	RHB	RF	
Ethan Shedbal	(Scotland)	RHB	RF	
Wicket-keepers
Kenny Reid	(Scotland)	RHB	W/K	
Bowlers
Isira Bandara	(Scotland)	RHB	RFM	
Sir David Gamblen	(Scotland)	RHB	RS	
James Robb	(England)	RHB	RS	
Luke Bain	(South Africa)	RHB	RFM	
Arnav Saraswat	(Scotland)	RHB	RF	

== Badge and colours ==
In 1893/4 Aberdeenshire CC employed the services of future England Test cricketer Schofield Haigh. Haigh joined the Aberdeen team from Yorkshire where he played his first-class cricket. The importance of this signing was shown by ACC's much debated agreement of club colours which had previously not been set. As Yorkshire's traditional colours were blue and yellow, the club decided that the club colours would be Cambridge Blue, Oxford Blue and Yellow.

== Home ground ==
Mannofield Park in the Mannofield district of Aberdeen is the regular home of the Scotland national cricket team and Aberdeenshire Cricket Club. It is also known as Citylets Mannofield for international fixtures.

The ground has also played host to 12 One Day Internationals, the first of which came in the 2008 Associates Tri-Series in Scotland when Ireland played New Zealand. The last One Day International to date came in May 2014 when Scotland lost to England.

The current groundsman of Aberdeenshire CC is Lewis Munro.
