= North Inch disaster =

Stadium structural failure in Perth, Scotland

North Inch Disaster
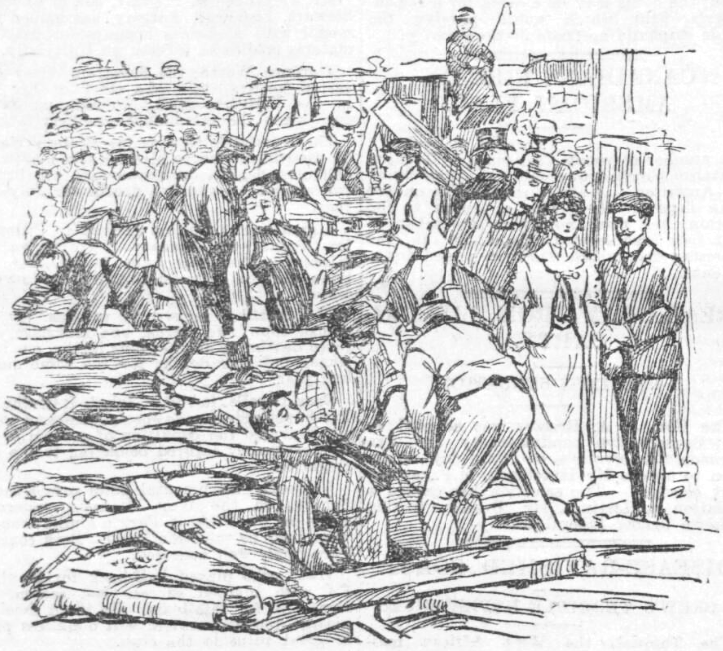
- Illustration showing the aftermath of the collapse
- Date: 1 August 1903
- Time: 14:55 local time
- Venue: North Inch
- Location: Perth, Scotland; 56.4027°N 3.4309°W
- Type: Stand collapse
- Cause: Overburdened end of stand caused total collapse of inadequate load-bearing trusses; design failed to account for non-uniform load
- Deaths: None
- Injuries: 150+
- Inquiries: December 1903
- Verdict: Contractor at fault

The North Inch Disaster was a collapse of a stand on the North Inch in Perth during a Scottish County Championship derby match between Perthshire and Forfarshire.

As was the case for many large events on the North Inch at the time, a temporary stand was erected to accommodate a section of the 5,000-strong crowd in the morning, increasing during the afternoon. At the time of the collapse, it was estimated that there were 488 people seated in the grandstand.

Eyewitness reports suggested the stand began to sway before the entire structure collapsed within seconds. Some of the most severely injured had fallen from the top of the stand, a height of over 30 feet (9.1 m).

The North Inch Disaster occurred just over a year after a similar stand collapse at Ibrox, with questions raised about how such an event could have been allowed to be repeated.

== Background ==
Around the time of the turn of the century cricket became an increasingly popular spectator sport in Scotland. No match was more well-attended than that of the inter-county between Perthshire and Forfarshire, with crowds at both home grounds, the North Inch and Forthill, regularly exceeding 20,000 in this fixture.

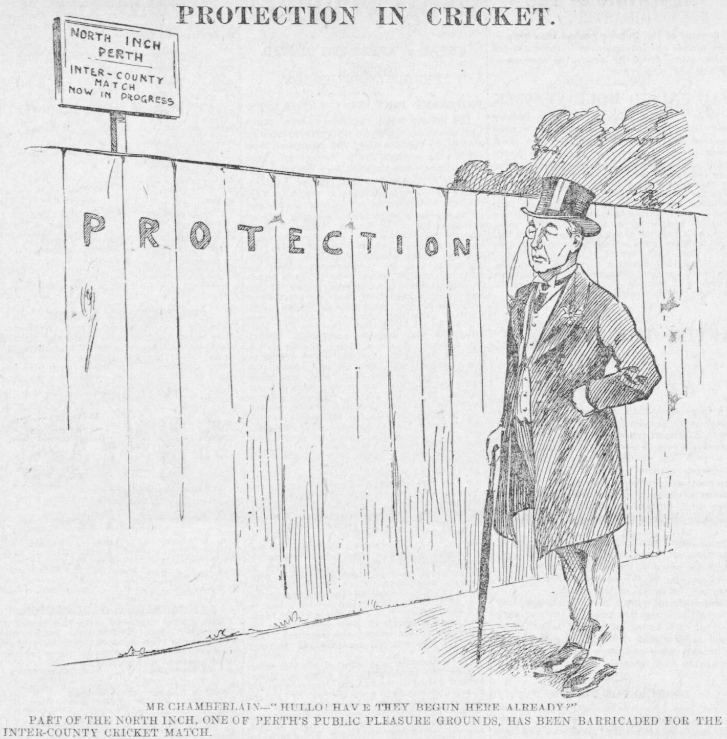
Cartoon from the day of the disaster poking fun at Joseph Chamberlain and showing the barrier around the park

In an attempt to avoid non-paying spectators from gaining access to the ground, hoarding had been erected around the boundary. It was also suggested that this would limit any overcrowding within the ground which could lead to injury.

The grandstand was a temporary construction which had been used the previous year for the inter-county against Forfarshire, as well as some other events in Perthshire in the preceding years. It had been inspected before the match started and was deemed safe by the Burgh surveyor.

The stand was positioned on the north-east part of the ground and, as a result of the more favourable viewing position at one end, tickets were charged at different prices. As spectators began to fill the stand, it was noted by eyewitnesses that the north section of the stand with the lower ticket prices was considerably more full than the south end.

== Event ==
Half an hour before the collapse, a bystander admiring the structure from below the stand noticed that the woodwork had sloped in one direction. This was not reported as it was assumed it was part of the original design.

Although it was initially feared that there could be a significant death toll due to the number of severe injuries, there were no reported deaths from the disaster. The number of injured, however, quickly overwhelmed the Royal Infirmary in the city.

== Aftermath ==
=== Inquiry ===
An inquiry took place in Perth in December 1903, overseen by the Sheriff of Perth, Andrew Jameson. He ruled that the contractors, Thomas Leith & Sons, who had erected the stand, were negligent in its construction and at fault for its collapse. The Sheriff also placed blame on the Burgh surveyor whom had passed the stand as safe for use.

On the balance of evidence presented to the inquiry, the Sheriff ruled that the most likely cause of the collapse was the lack of sufficient bracing and the use of nails instead of eight-inch bolts. This exacerbated the inadequate design of the structure to withstand a non-uniform load. That is, due to the influx of people to the part of the stand with less expensive tickets, this created an unequal load across the structure which it was not designed for and, therefore, overloaded the north part of the structure causing its collapse.

Accounts from eyewitnesses suggest a form of progressive collapse was the reason for the failure of the entire structure rather than one section. This has been suggested as a reason why there were no fatalities, as the stand collapsed intact and upright.

=== Financial compensation ===
Although Perthshire was found not to have been at fault for the disaster, it was required to pay out a significant amount in compensation to those injured, a total of £3643 18s 6d (equivalent to £383,076 in 2025). Part of this compensation was covered as a result of a national disaster fund which raised at least £700, but the Perth club was still left financially vulnerable in the aftermath.

=== Accusation of casualty count under-reporting ===
While the official number of injuries was just over 150, it was written at the time that local authorities were pursuing a campaign of censorship in an attempt to underplay the severity of the already unprecedented emergency response, under-reporting the true number of casualties.

== See also ==
- List of structural failures and collapses
