= Moncreiffe Island =

Island in Scotland

Monadh Craoibhe (Gaelic)
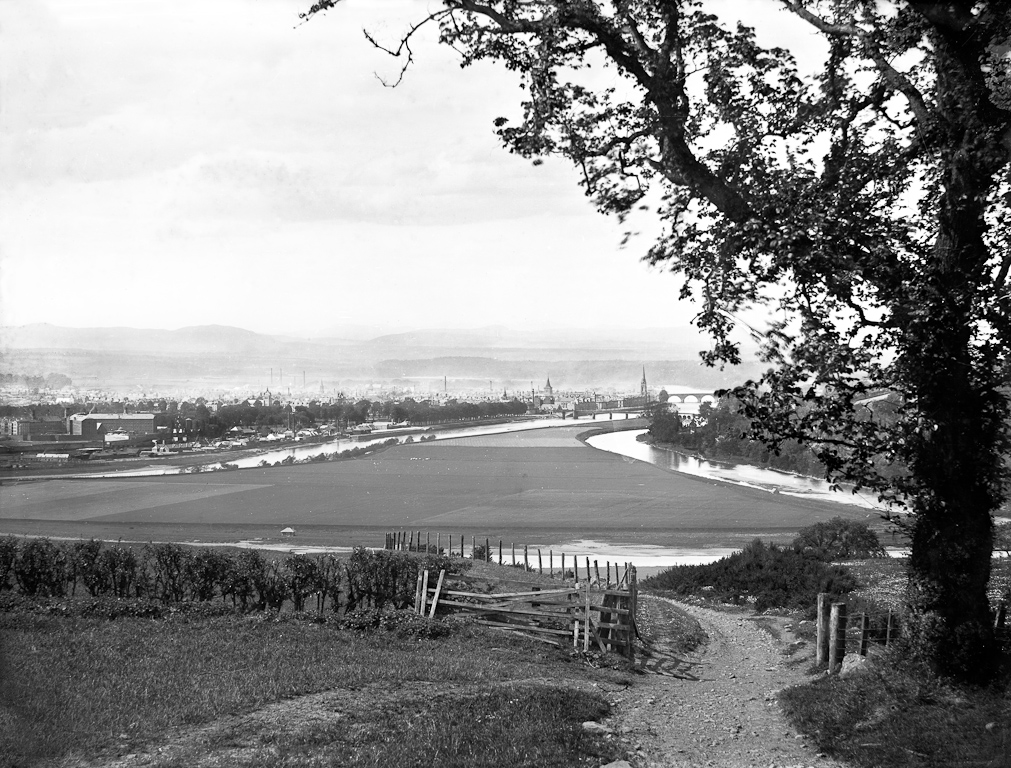
- The island around 1880, looking northwest to the centre of Perth

Location
- Location within Scotland
- OS grid reference: NO122220
- Coordinates: 56.38°N 3.42°W

Name
- Name meaning: Moorland of the Tree

Physical geography
- Island group: River Tay
- Area: 46 ha (110 acres)
- Area rank: 209 (Freshwater: 7)
- Highest elevation: 5 m (16 ft)

Administration
- Council area: Perth and Kinross
- Country: Scotland
- Sovereign state: United Kingdom

Demographics
- Population: 1
- Population rank: 95= (Freshwater: 4=)
- Population density: 6.5 people/km^{2}

Moncreiffe Island, also known as Friarton Island, is an island in Perth, Scotland. It divides the River Tay into two channels as it flows through Perth, and is crossed by the single-track Tay Viaduct, carrying the Scottish Central Railway.

One half of the island is within Perth; the other is within Kinnoull parish.

== Land use ==
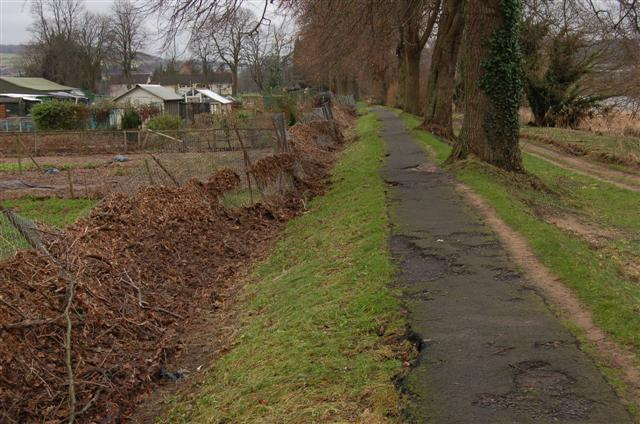
Allotments belonging to The Perth Working Men's Garden Association.

The King James VI Golf Course is situated on and covers much of the island with the remaining land used for allotments.

At the 2011 and 2022 censuses, it was one of only two permanently inhabited freshwater islands in Scotland which are not on Loch Lomond, the other being Innis Chonain in Loch Awe.

== Wildlife ==
There are wild garlic, common bluebells, sweet cicely, broom and dog violets. The island is also frequently used by beavers.
