= Mannofield Park =

Cricket ground in Scotland

Coordinates: 57.1297°N 2.1370°W

Mannofield
- Mannofield
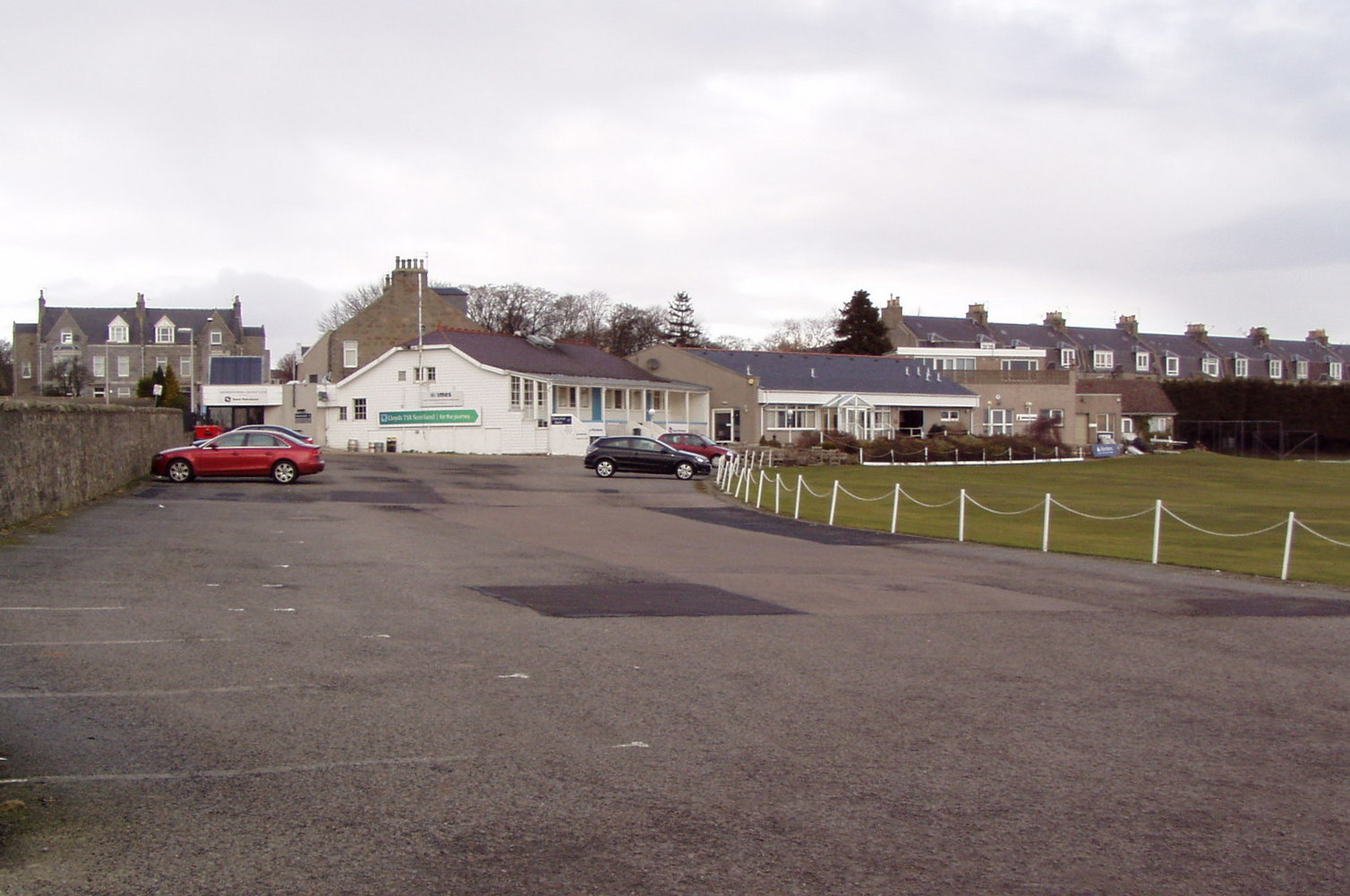

Ground information
- Location: Morningside Road, Aberdeen, Aberdeenshire
- Country: Scotland
- Establishment: 1879 (First recorded match)
- Capacity: 6,000
- Owner: Aberdeenshire Cricket Club
- Operator: Aberdeenshire Cricket Club
- Tenants: None
- End names
- Morningside Lane End; Hutchison Terrace End

International information
- First ODI: 1 July 2008: Ireland v New Zealand
- Last ODI: 17 August 2022: Scotland v United States
- First T20I: 4 July 2013: Scotland v Kenya
- Last T20I: 5 July 2013: Scotland v Kenya

Team information
Aberdeenshire Cricket Club	(1890–present)
- As of 20 June 2024; Source: Cricinfo

Mannofield is a cricket ground in the Mannofield district of Aberdeen, Scotland. The cricket ground is the home of the Aberdeenshire Cricket Club and the Scotland national cricket team regularly plays international matches at this venue.

== History ==
The first recorded match on the ground dates back to 1879 when Aberdeen University played Edinburgh University. The first first-class match to be held on the ground came in 1930 when Scotland played Ireland national cricket team. The ground has been host to many great cricketing names over the years, most notably Sir Donald Bradman, who scored his last century on British soil at the ground in 1948.

The ground has played host to 11 first-class matches, the last of which came in July 2013 when Scotland beat Kenya in the 2011–2013 ICC Intercontinental Cup.

The ground has also played host to 22 One Day Internationals (ODI), the first of which came in the 2008 Associates Tri-Series in Scotland when Ireland played New Zealand. The most recent ODIs staged were in August 2022 when the venue hosted the 15th round of the 2019–2023 ICC Cricket World Cup League 2.

It was selected to host Scotland's World Cricket League and Intercontinental Cup matches in August 2016. In May 2019, the International Cricket Council (ICC) named it as the venue for the opening round of fixtures of the 2019–22 ICC Cricket World Cup League 2 tournament.

== International centuries ==
=== One-Day Internationals ===
Ten ODI centuries have been scored at the venue.

No.	Score	Player	Team	Balls	Opponent	Date	Result
1	161	James Marshall	New Zealand	141	Ireland	1 July 2008	Won
2	166	Brendon McCullum	New Zealand	135	Ireland	1 July 2008	Won
3	115	Gavin Hamilton (1/2)	Scotland	150	Ireland	2 July 2008	Won
4	119	Gavin Hamilton (2/2)	Scotland	150	Canada	7 July 2008	Lost
5	119	Fraser Watts	Scotland	108	Canada	7 July 2008	Lost
6	117	Sandeep Jyoti	Canada	108	Scotland	7 July 2008	Won
7	114	Matt Machan	Scotland	111	Kenya	30 June 2013	Won
8	123*	Aaron Jones	United States	87	Scotland	13 August 2022	Lost
9	117	Calum MacLeod (1/2)	Scotland	91	United States	13 August 2022	Won
10	133*	Calum MacLeod (2/2)	Scotland	144	United States	17 August 2022	Lost

== International five-wicket hauls ==
=== One-Day Internationals ===
Two five-wicket hauls have been taken at the venue.

No.	Bowler	Date	Team	Opposing team	Inn	Overs	Runs	Wkts	Econ	Result
1	Hamza Tahir	18 August 2019	Scotland	Oman	2	9.2	38	5	4.07	Won
2	Mark Watt	14 August 2022	Scotland	United Arab Emirates	2	10	33	5	3.30	Won
