= North Inch =

Park in Perth, Scotland

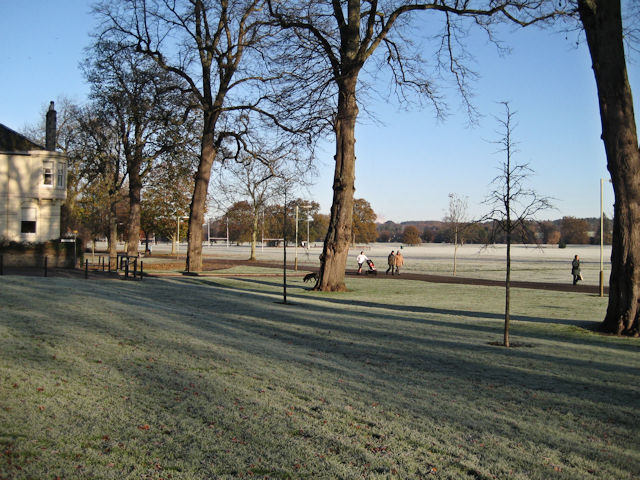
- The North Inch from its southwestern corner, beside Rose Terrace, in 2009

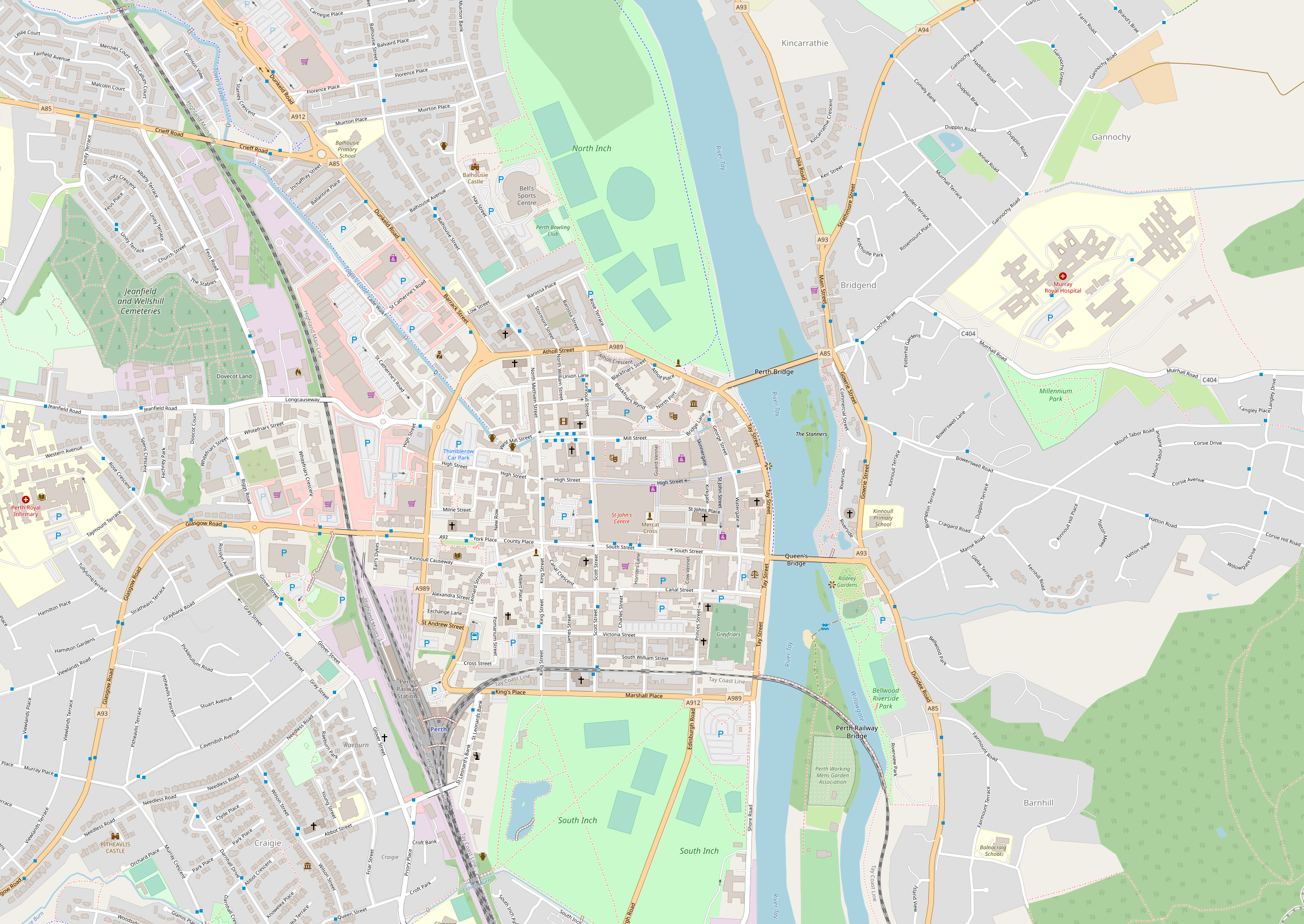
- Location within Perth
- Type: Urban park
- Location: Perth, Scotland, United Kingdom
- Coordinates: 56.40397°N 3.43158°W
- Area: 140 acres (57 ha)
- Created: 1374
- Owner: Perth and Kinross Council
- Operator: Perth and Kinross Council

North Inch is a large public park in Perth, Scotland. About 57 hectares (140 acres) in size, it is one of two "Inches" in Perth, the other being the smaller, 31-hectare South Inch, located half a mile across the city. The inches were granted to the city, when it was a royal burgh, by King Robert II in 1374. Both inches were once islands in the River Tay; today, they are connected by Tay Street, part of the A989.

The inch was the site of the "Battle of the Clans" in 1396.

Balhousie Castle and Bell's Sports Centre are located on its western edge.

A path circumnavigates the entire park.

Overlooking the southern edge of the Inch is the Old Academy, built between 1803 and 1807.

Perth Bridge, which is also known as Smeaton's Bridge and the Old Bridge, is nearby.

In the 1840s, a large addition was made to the Inch by an excambion with the Thomas Hay-Drummond, 11th Earl of Kinnoull, bringing it up to 100 acres (40 ha).

Three years after her husband's death in 1861, Queen Victoria unveiled a statue of Albert, Prince Consort, at the Inch. The couple and their children had stayed at the city's Royal George Hotel in 1848. It was their first time staying in a hotel, an occurrence prompted by their inability to stay at nearby Scone Palace because William Murray, 4th Earl of Mansfield, was out of town.

Another statue, an obelisk near the river bank, commemorates the 90th Regiment of Foot, the Perthshire Volunteers, alias the Grey Breeks. It was unveiled by Garnet Wolseley, 1st Viscount Wolseley, on 8 December 1896. A bandstand formerly stood to the west of the obelisk, a gift of James Pullar.

Unveiled in 1995, the 51st (Highland) Division War Memorial commemorates the soldiers of that infantry lost in World War II.

== Sports ==
Several sports take place on various parts of the Inch, including cricket, rugby and golf.

=== Golf ===
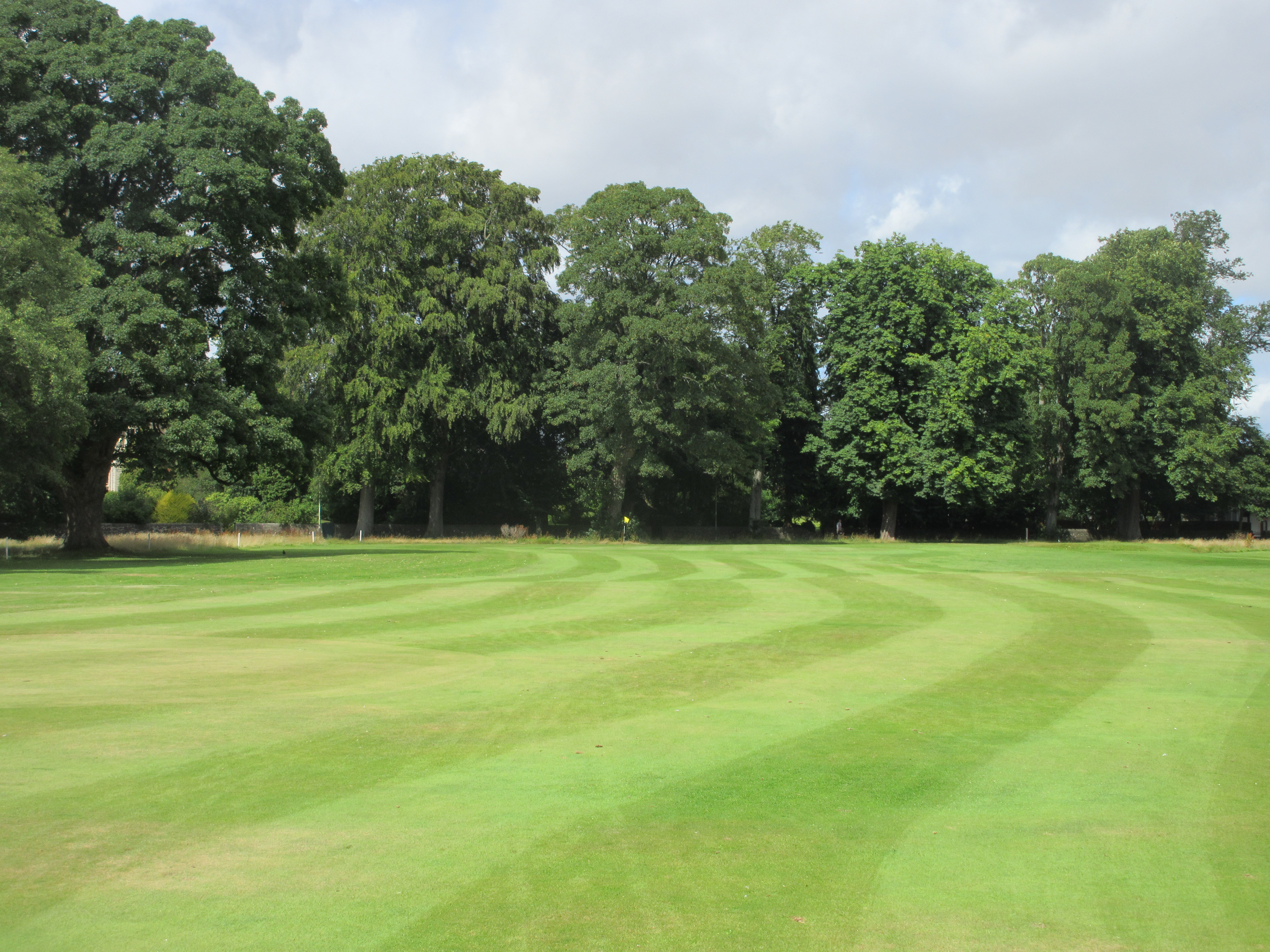
The first hole, "Inch Royal," at North Inch Golf Course

There is a reference to King James IV playing golf in Perth in 1504, despite a recently passed law prohibiting the game.

King James VI Golf Club was formed in 1858, and held its matches on the Inch until 1897. After a dispute with the tenant of Muirton over grazing rights had led to the temporary loss of the extension to the Inch course, it opened its own, laid out by "Old" Tom Morris, then of Prestwick, on Moncreiffe Island.

In 1861, the town council planted trees on the Inch as an amenity for the public. The patrons of the Inch's golf course, not appreciative of the interference the trees would cause in their rounds, uprooted them. The council decided not to replace them.

In 1864 and 1866, the Inch was the venue for two open tournaments. That of 1864 was won by Old Tom Morris. His son, "Young" Tom Morris, played in the same tournament.

The golf course has had eighteen holes since 1892.

=== Rugby ===
Perthshire RFC, formed in 1868, plays its home games on the Inch. As of 2024, the club are members of Caledonia Region League Division One.

=== Cricket ===
North Inch
- Interactive map of North Inch

Ground information
- Location: Perth, Scotland
- Country: Scotland
- Establishment: 1849 (first recorded match)
- End names
- Top End; City End

Team information
Scotland	(1909–1989)
- As of 19 October 2011; Source: Ground profile

The first recorded cricket match held on the ground came in 1849, when Perth played Grange. The ground held its first first-class match when Scotland played Ireland in 1909. Five further first-class matches were played there, the last of which came in 1970 when Scotland played Ireland. Other first-class matches had seen the ground host the Australians in 1912, Wales in 1923, and the South Africans in 1929. The ground held its first List A match when Scotland played Yorkshire in the 1984 Benson & Hedges Cup. Three further List A matches were played there, the last of which saw Scotland play Lancashire in the 1989 Benson & Hedges Cup. In the 1986 Benson & Hedges Cup Scotland historically defeated Lancashire, marking their first defeat of county opposition in limited-overs cricket.

During an inter-county match against Forfarshire, a temporary stand holding nearly 500 people collapsed, injuring over 150 people.

In recent history the ground has become the victim of repeated vandalism and lack of funds. This led, in 2009, to the extinction of Perth County Cricket Club, which played at North Inch.

== Gallery ==
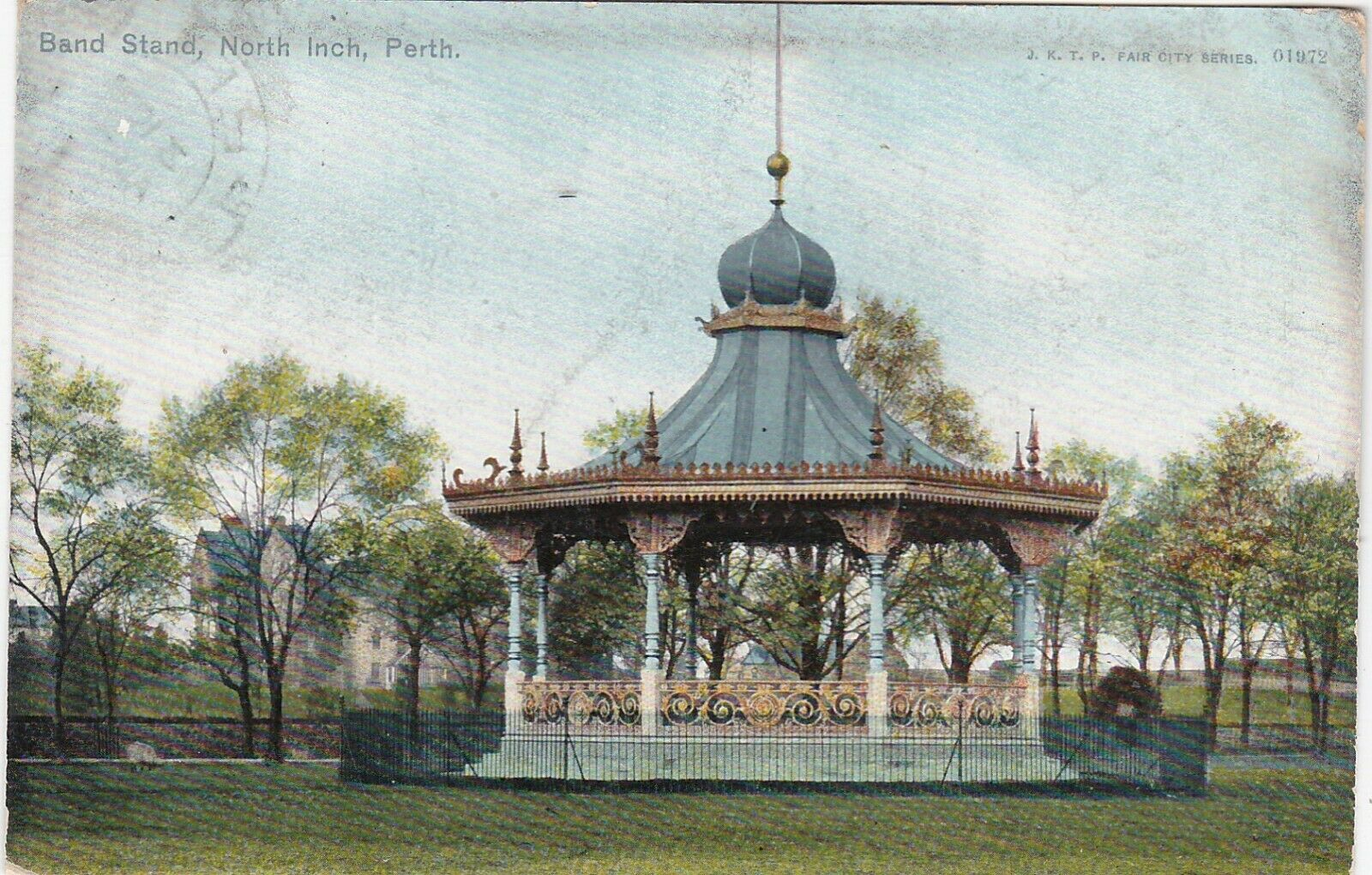
Now-demolished bandstand, a gift to the city from James Pullar in the early 20th century

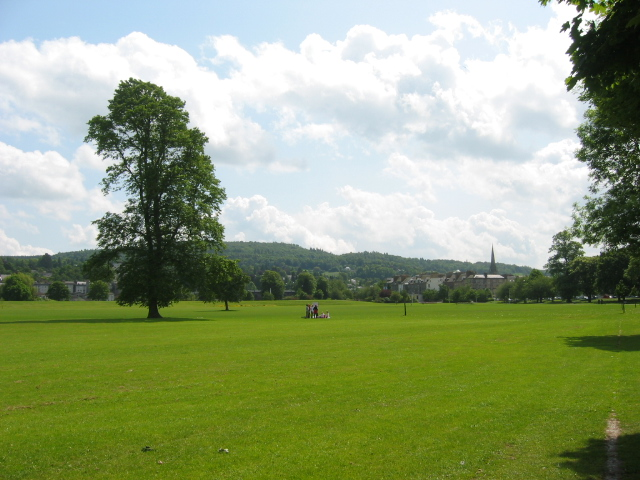
Looking southeast towards the city centre

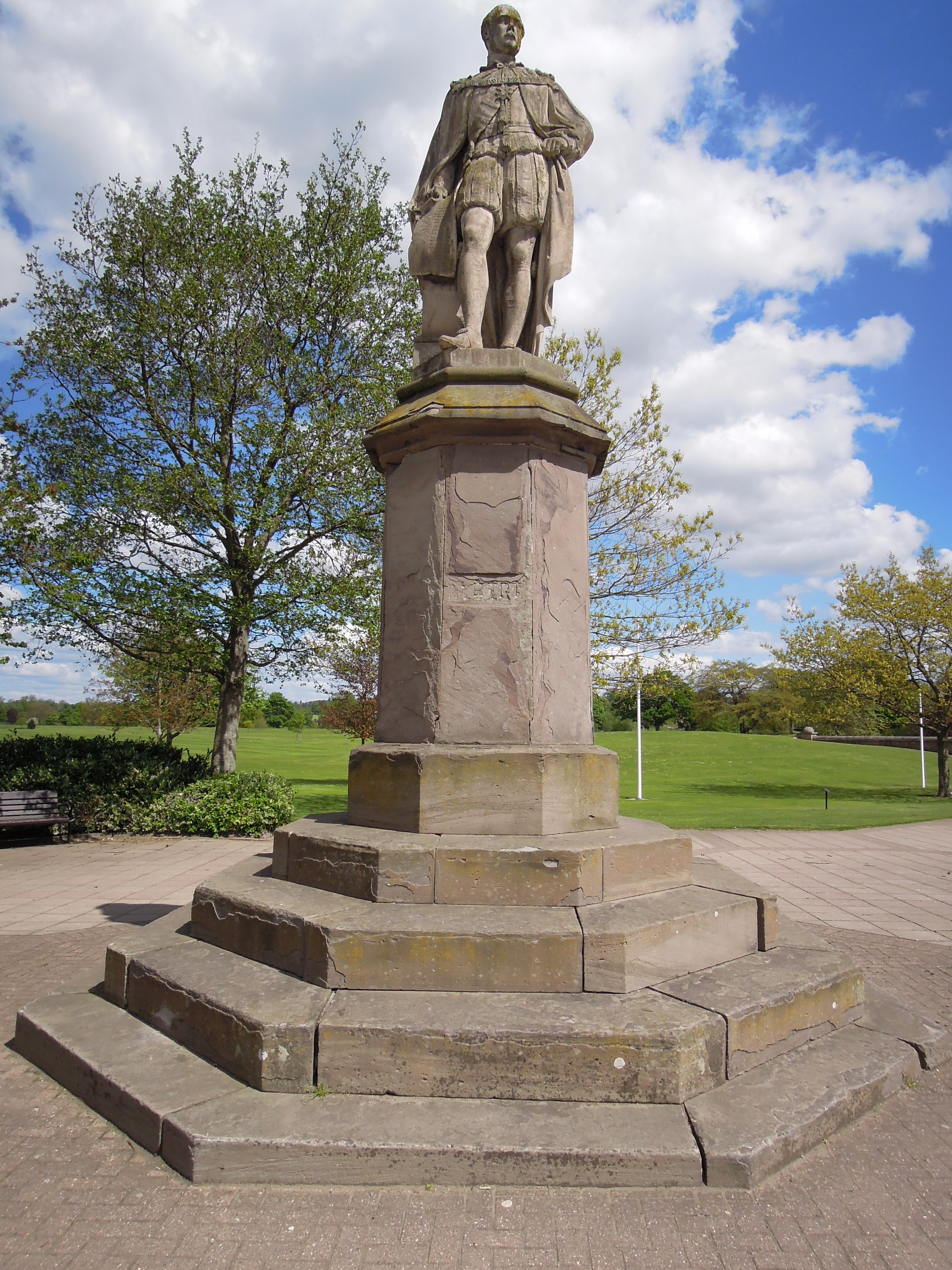
Statue of Albert, Prince Consort, unveiled by his widow, Queen Victoria, in 1864

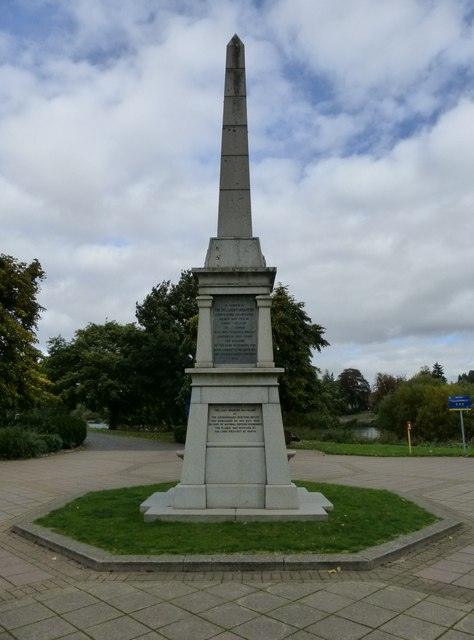
Memorial to the 90th Regiment of Foot, Perthshire Volunteers

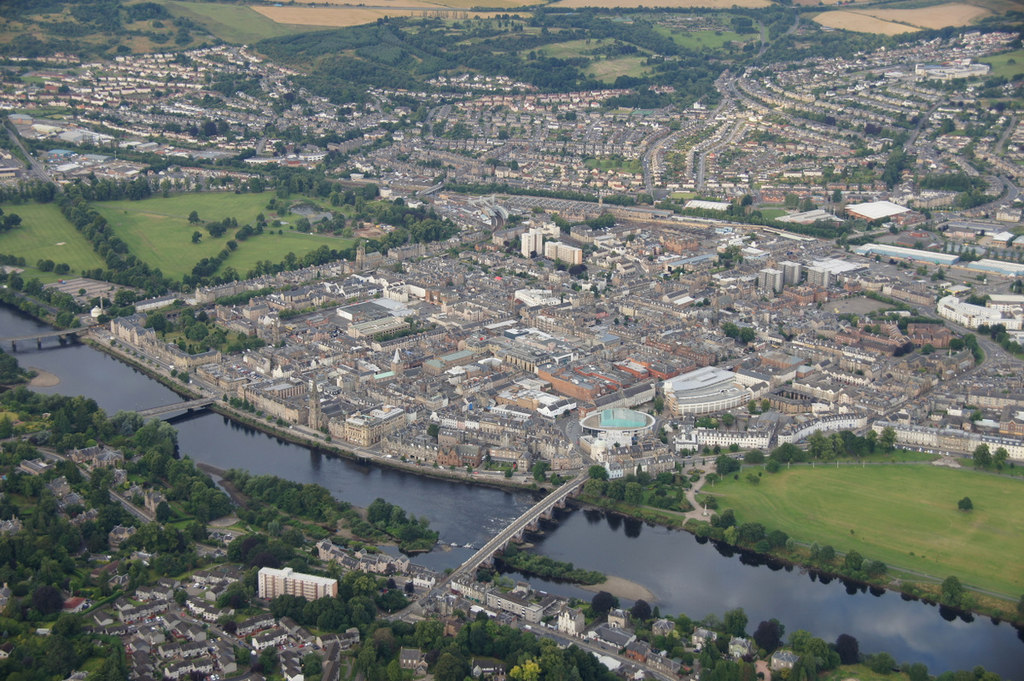
The North Inch is on the right in this aerial view of the city
