= List of people educated at Fettes College =

Former pupils of Fettes College in Edinburgh are known in some circles as Old Fettesians. They sometimes refer to themselves as "OFs" and can use the post nominal "OF" (in Fettes contexts).

== Arts and culture ==
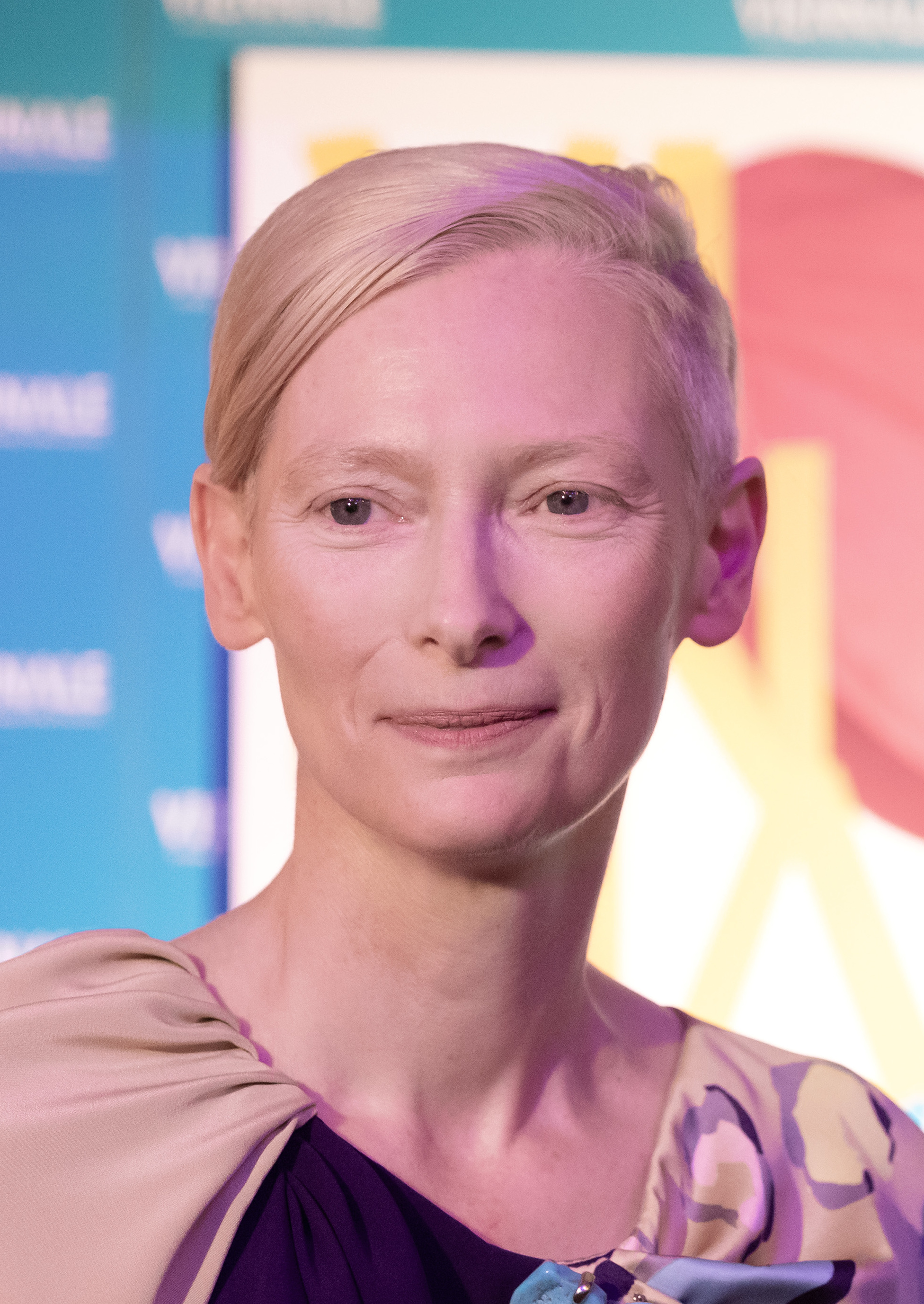
Tilda Swinton

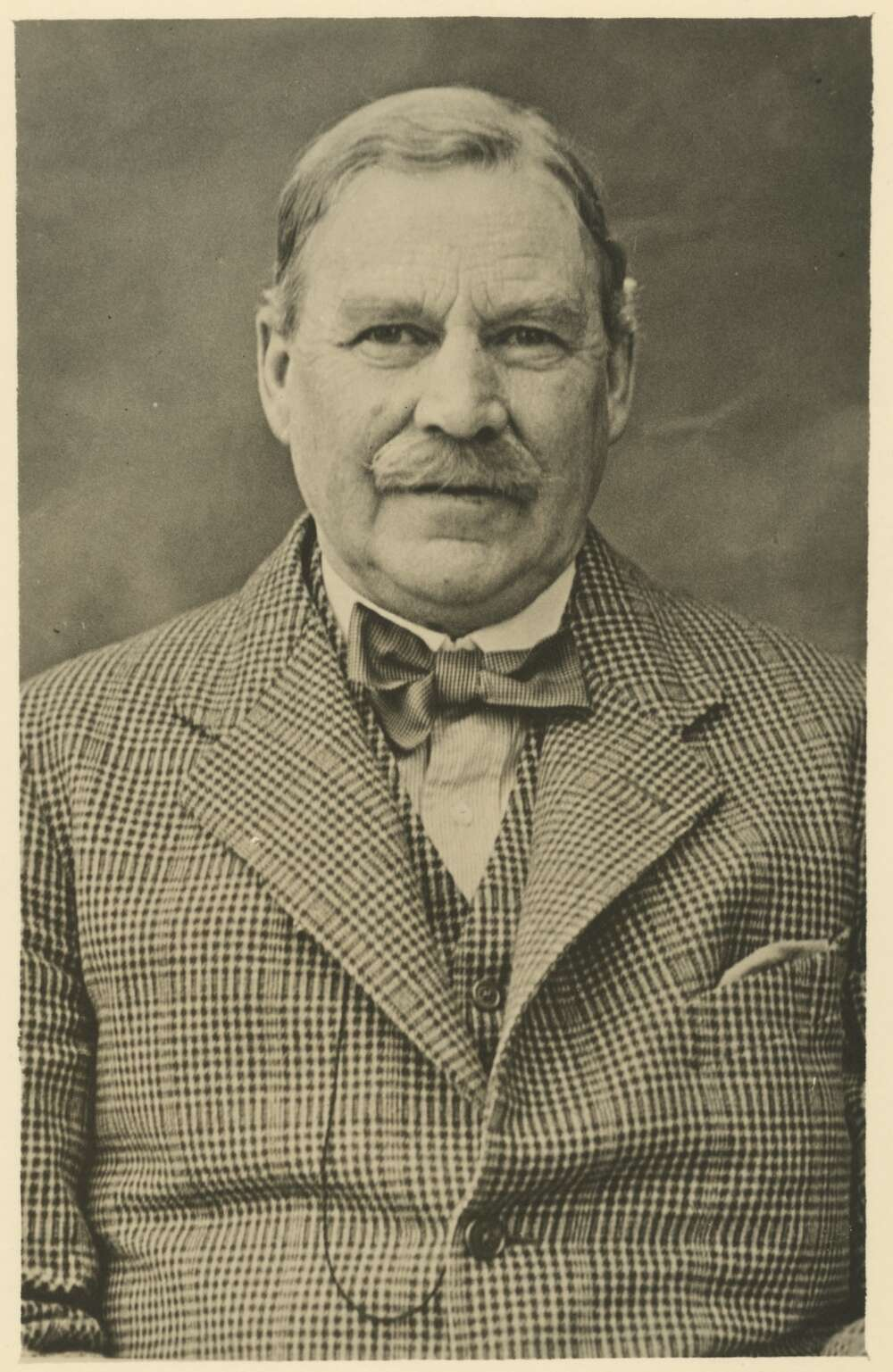
W.H. Ogilvie

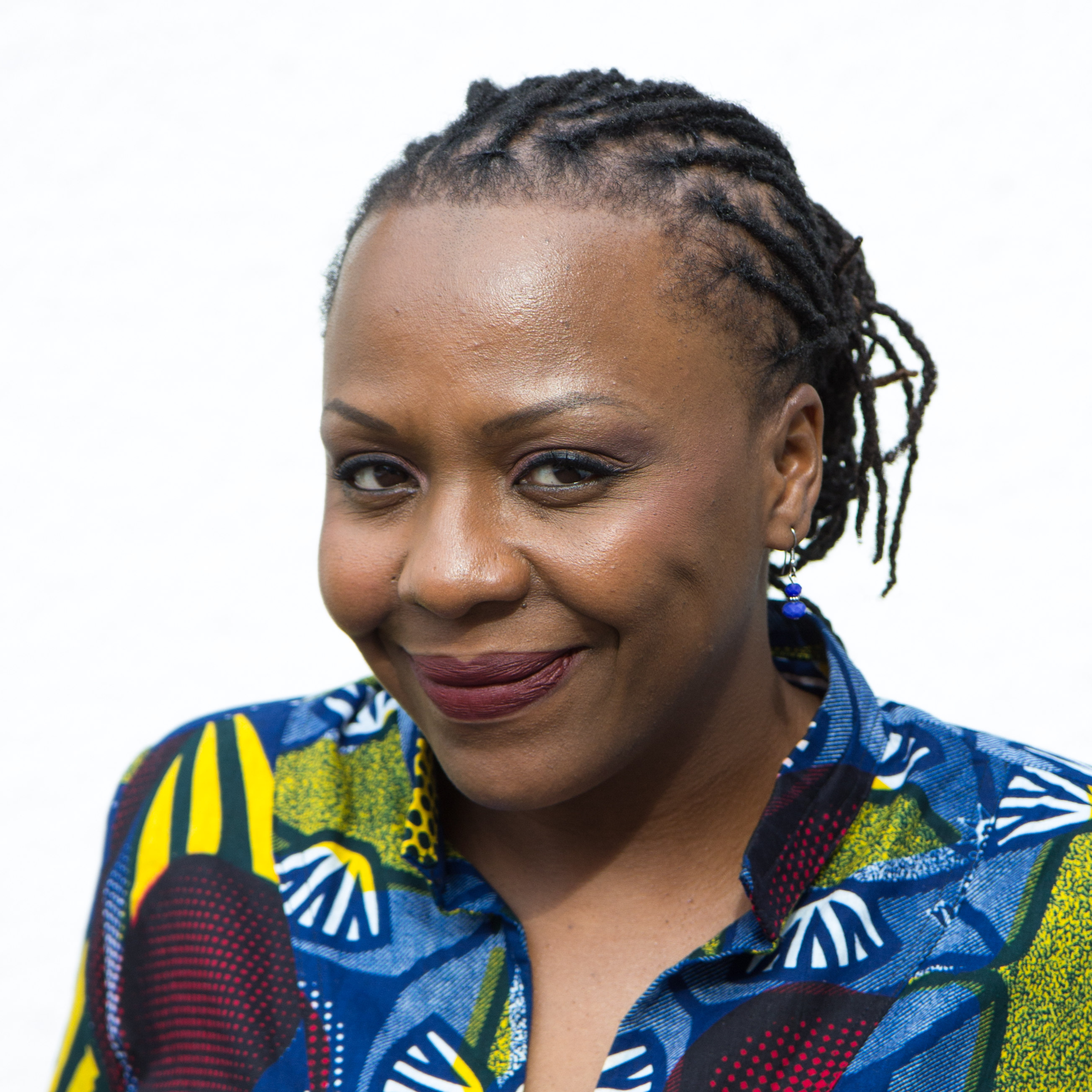
Lola Shoneyin

- Lorne Balfe, composer and music producer.
- John Hay Beith (aka Ian Hay), writer.
- Hugh Enes Blackmore, performer in the Gilbert and Sullivan operas in the late 19th century.
- Norman Cameron, poet.
- William Corlett, author.
- Simon Cowe, folk-rock musician, member of Lindisfarne
- James Duff Duff, translator and classical scholar.
- Alistair Elliot, poet and translator.
- Abimbola Fernandez, lead singer of Pink Grenade.
- Hamilton Fyfe, playwright, editor and journalist.
- N. G. L. Hammond, classical scholar.
- Archibald Standish Hartrick, artist.
- George Campbell Hay, poet in English and Scottish Gaelic amongst other languages, who wryly called Fettes College a little piece of "Forever England".
- Arthur Benison Hubback, architect, soldier and sportsman.
- Ross Leckie, historical novelist.
- Louise Linton, actor and screenwriter.
- W.L. Lorimer, linguist, chair of Greek at St. Andrews, chairman of the Executive Council of the Scottish National Dictionary, and translator of the New Testament into Lowland Scots.
- Andrew Lownie, historian and author.
- Roderick Macdonald, artist.
- Roderick MacFarquhar, Orientalist.
- Charles McKean, historian and architecturalist.
- David MacLennan, theatre
- Elizabeth Macneal, author of The Doll Factory
- George James Miller, architect
- William Henry Ogilvie, Scottish-Australian narrative poet and horseman.
- William Robert Ogilvie-Grant, wildlife artist
- Arthur Forman Balfour Paul, architect.
- John Purser, composer, musicologist, music historian and playwright.
- Harry Reid, journalist and author.
- James Maurice Scott, writer.
- W. C. Sellar, co-author of 1066 and All That, Head of School 1917 and taught at the school.
- Hal Summers, poet.
- Derek Shiel, artist.
- Lola Shoneyin, Nigerian poet and author.
- Tilda Swinton, screen actress and Oscar winner, attended in her sixth year.
- Hugh Stewart, academic.
- D. R. Thorpe, historian and biographer.
- Michael Tippett, composer.
- Ruthven Todd, Scottish poet and novelist, known also as an editor of William Blake and as an artist.
- Aylmer Vallance, journalist.
- Edward Wadsworth, artist.
- Ian Weatherhead, English water colourist

== Legal profession ==
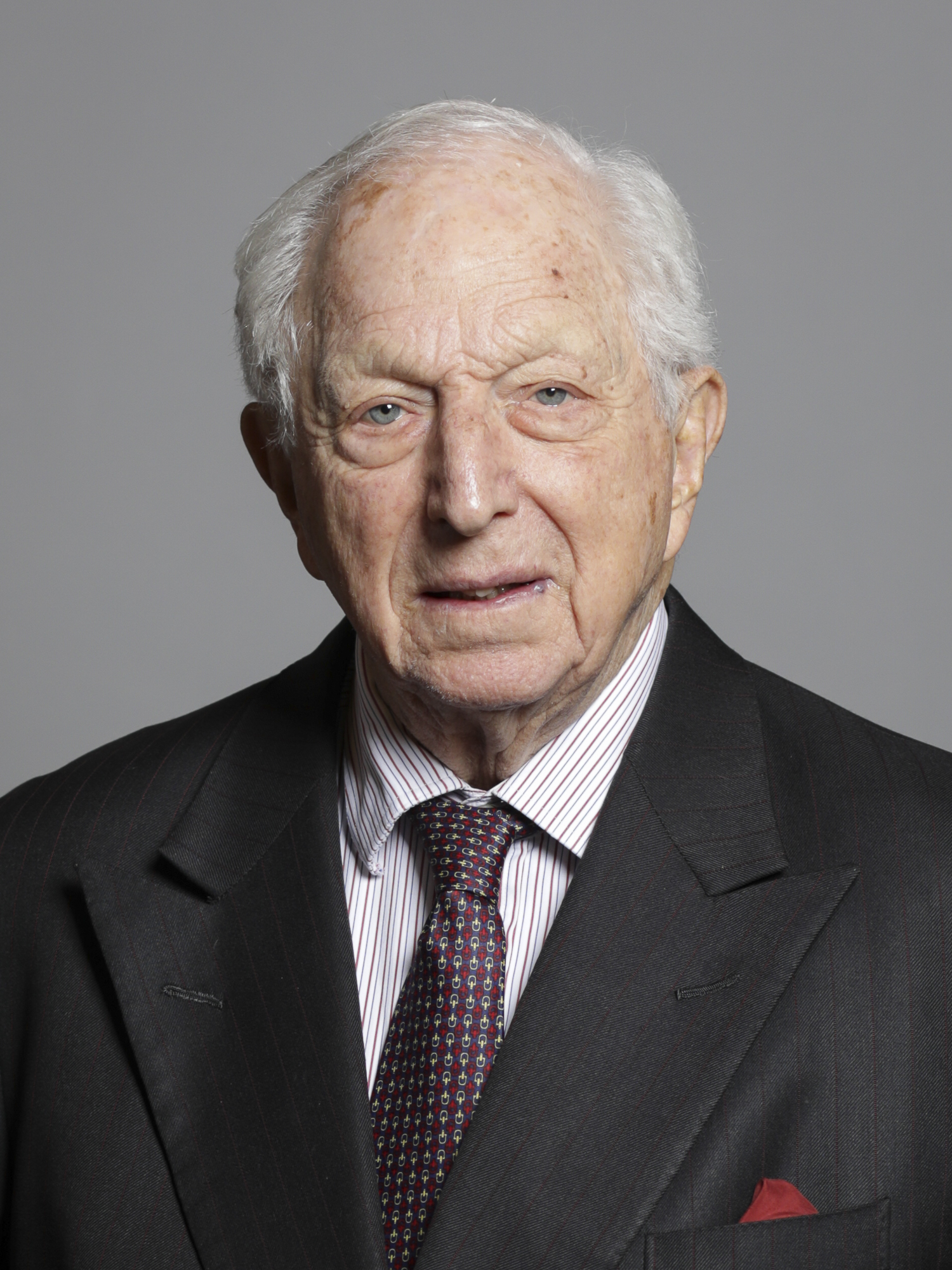
Baron Woolf

- John Cameron, Lord Coulsfield, Senator of the College of Justice in Scotland; Lockerbie trial judge; Privy Counsellor
- William Blair, judge.
- Lord William Cowie, rugby international and Senator of the College of Justice.
- George Cunningham, civil servant.
- William Grant, Lord Grant
- Alexander Mackenzie Stuart, Baron Mackenzie-Stuart, advocate and judge.
- Ranald MacLean, judge.
- Alastair Montgomerie, Criminal Deemster of the Isle of Man.
- Wilfrid Guild Normand, Lord Justice General; Lord President of Court of Session (1935–47); Lord of Appeal (1947–53)
- Alan Stewart Orr (1911-1991), Lord Justice of Appeal
- Sidney Rowlatt, lawyer and judge.
- Edward Theodore Salvesen, lawyer, politician and judge.
- Harry Woolf, Baron Woolf, lawyer, Master of the Rolls and Lord Chief Justice of England and Wales.
- Douglas Young, lawyer
- Robin Young, civil servant

== Military ==
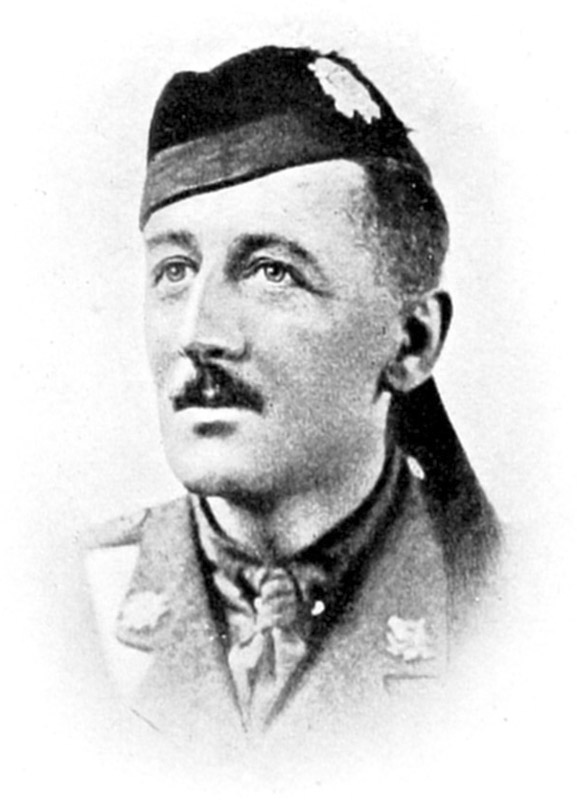
William Herbert Anderson

Four Old Fettesians have won the Victoria Cross and one the George Cross.

- William Herbert Anderson, VC
- Robert Keith Arbuthnott, 15th Viscount of Arbuthnott, CB CBE DSO MC
- Frank Barnwell, Chief designer of the Bristol bomber, Blenheim fighter, etc.
- R. H. Bruce Lockhart Author; British representative to provisional Czech Government (1940–41); Director-General Political Warfare Executive (1941–45).
- General John de Chastelain, CMM, Canadian. Chairman Independent International Commission on Decommissioning, Northern Ireland peace process
- George Denholm, RAF fighter pilot.
- David Howard, 7th Earl of Effingham, naval officer
- Robert Gordon, RAF officer
- Sandy Gunn, RAF photo reconnaissance Spitfire pilot, executed after the Great Escape
- John Hall CMG DSO, British Army brigadier-general.
- Sandy Hodge, Royal Navy officer
- Hector Lachlan Stewart MacLean VC.
- Robert Lawrence, British Army officer involved in the Battle of Mount Tumbledown and the subject of the film and play Tumbledown.
- Roderick Macdonald KBE Chief of Staff to C-in-C Allied Naval Forces (1973–77), artist.
- Donald MacKintosh, VC.
- Tommy Macpherson, soldier and businessman.
- William Macpherson, colonel-commandant of the Royal Army Medical Corps.
- Norman Macqueen, RAF fighter pilot
- Maury Meiklejohn, VC.
- Gordon Neilson, CMG, DSO, Boer War and World War I officer
- George Pirie, former Inspector-General of the RAF.
- Harold Pyman, former Deputy Chief of the General Staff
- Freddie Scott, British Army officer
- Robert Walmsley, Royal Navy Vice-Admiral.
- Robert Whigham, former British Adjutant-General to the Forces.

== Politics and diplomacy ==
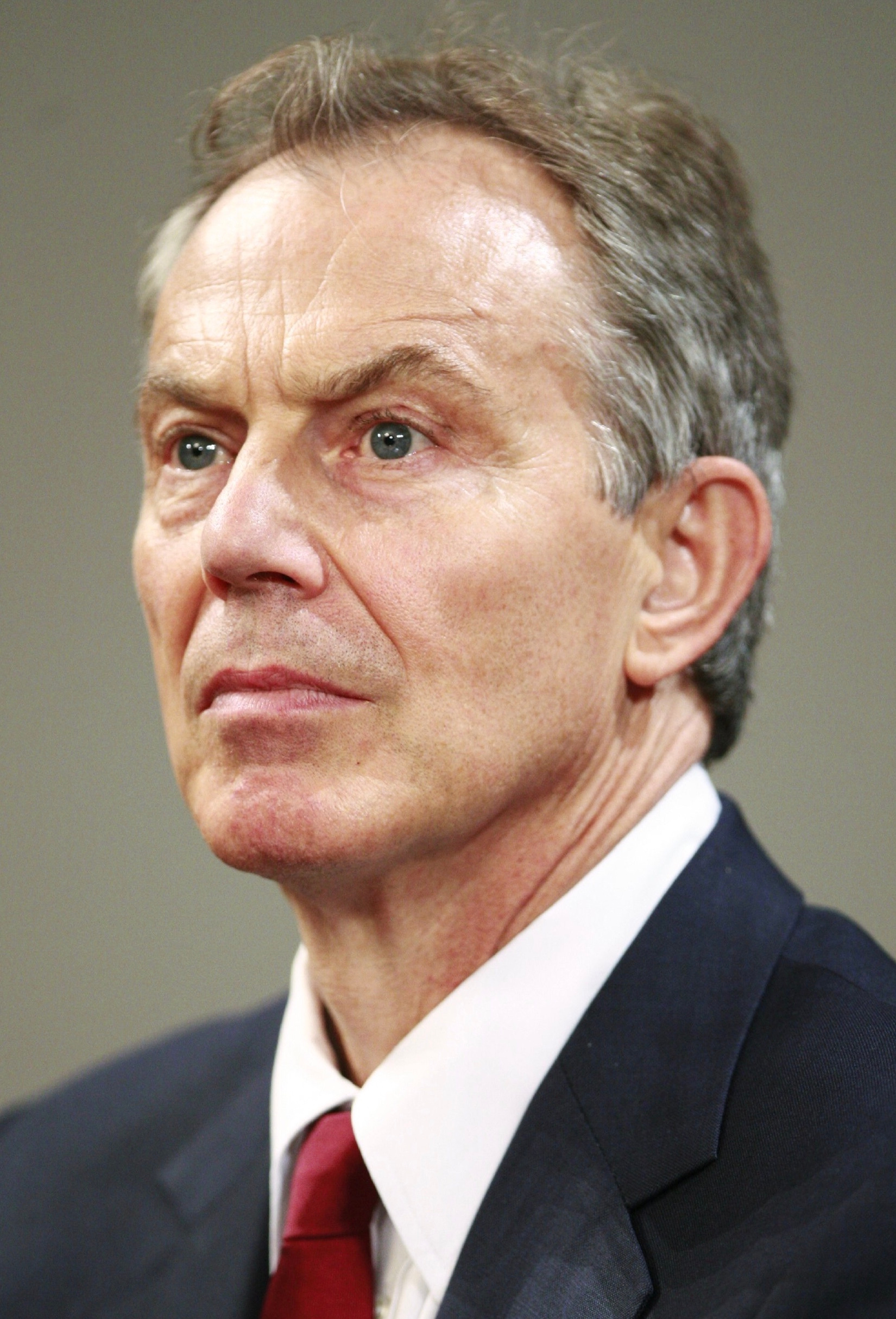
Tony Blair

- Tony Blair, Prime Minister of the United Kingdom from 2 May 1997 to 27 June 2007; the Leader of the Labour Party from 1994 to 2007 and the MP for Sedgefield from 1983 to 2007.
- James Glencairn Cunningham, Unionist politician.
- Josias Cunningham, politician.
- Knox Cunningham, politician.
- Alan Donald, diplomat and ambassador.
- David Durie, governor of Gibraltar.
- Michael Fraser
- Hamilton Grant, diplomat and politician.
- William Grant, politician and judge.
- Ian Harvey, politician.
- John Deans Hope, Liberal politician.
- Douglas Jamieson, Unionist politician and judge.
- Selwyn Lloyd, Baron Selwyn Lloyd CH PC, Foreign Secretary and Chancellor of the Exchequer.
- Roderick MacFarquhar, Labour politician.
- Ian MacIntyre, Unionist politician
- Dr Ian McKee, former Scottish National Party MSP.
- Joseph Maclay, businessman and Liberal politician.
- Iain Macleod, Minister of Labour, Colonial Secretary and Chancellor of the Exchequer.
- John MacLeod, Liberal politician.
- Niall Macpherson
- T. E. Moir, civil servant in India.
- George Morton, Labour politician.
- Wilfrid Normand, Unionist politician and judge.
- John Simon, Home Secretary, Foreign Secretary, Chancellor of the Exchequer, Lord Chancellor, former Head of School.
- David Webster, Conservative politician.

== Religion ==
- Philip Christopher Baldwin, Prominent gay Christian and member of the Church of England's General Synod.
- William Theodore Heard, Roman Catholic cardinal.
- W.L. Lorimer, translator of the New Testament into Lowland Scots.
- Edward Reid, Anglican bishop.
- William Roy Sanderson, Moderator of the Church of Scotland.
- Gilbert White, Anglican colonial bishop.

== Science and academia ==
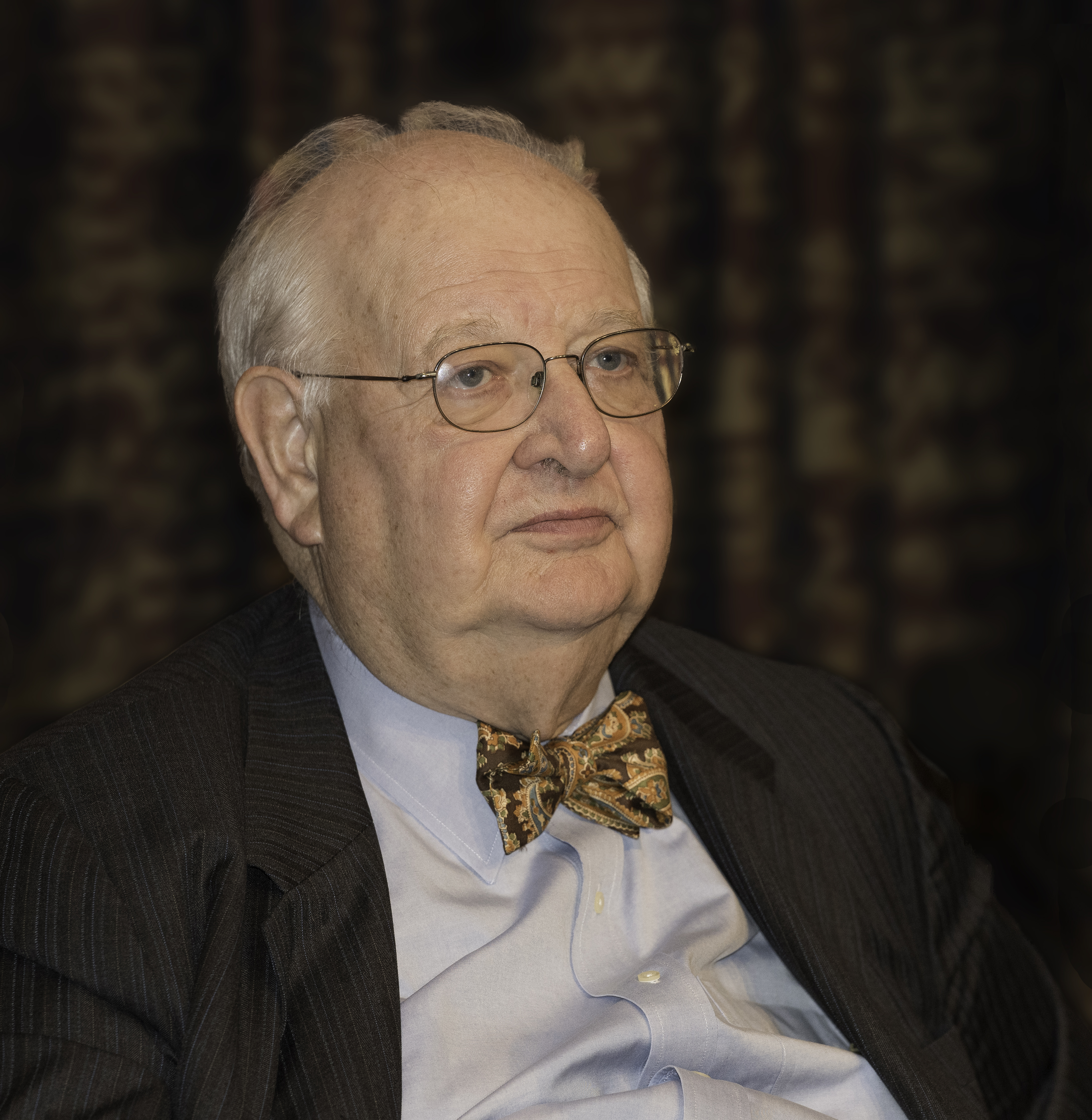
Angus Deaton, Nobel Prize winner

- Fereydoon Batamanghelidj, controversial Persian/Iranian doctor.
- Andrew Michael Burnett numismatist, deputy director of the British Museum from 2003 to 2013
- A. Y. Campbell, translator.
- Alan Archibald Campbell-Swinton, electrical engineer and television pioneer.
- Hugh Crichton-Miller, psychiatrist, founder of the Tavistock Clinic.
- Angus Deaton, Professor of Economics and president of the American Economic Association, Nobel Prize in Economics winner 2015.
- James Douglas Hamilton Dickson, mathematician.
- Ian Donald, medical pioneer in ultrasound.
- William Hamilton Fyfe, Principal of Queen's University and of the University of Aberdeen.
- N. G. L. Hammond, Hellenist.
- Robert Henderson, physician.
- William Lorimer, scholar.
- Thomas Tudor Loveday, Principal of Southampton University College (1920–22) and Vice Chancellor of the University of Bristol (1922–44).
- Roderick MacFarquhar, orientalist.
- Lawrie Hugh McGavin, surgeon.
- Charles McKean, author, journalist and professor emeritus of Scottish Architectural History at Dundee University.
- William Robert Ogilvie-Grant, ornithologist.
- Robert Alexander Rankin, mathematician who worked in analytic number theory.
- Cecil Reddie, educationalist.
- Arthur David Ritchie, chemical physiologist and philosopher
- R. R. R. Smith, classicist and archaeologist,
- John M Squire, biophysicist.
- Walter Terence Stace, educator, philosopher and epistemologist, who wrote on Hegel, mysticism, and moral relativism.
- Frederick Stewart, geologist.
- Hugh Stewart, classical scholar.
- Alan Stout, moral philosopher.
- Iain Sutherland, British ambassador to the Soviet Union.
- D. R. Thorpe, biographer
- Robert Wedderburn, co-developer, with John Nelder, of the generalized linear model methodology.
- Philip Jacob White, zoologist.
- John Macnaghten Whittaker, mathematician.

== Sport ==
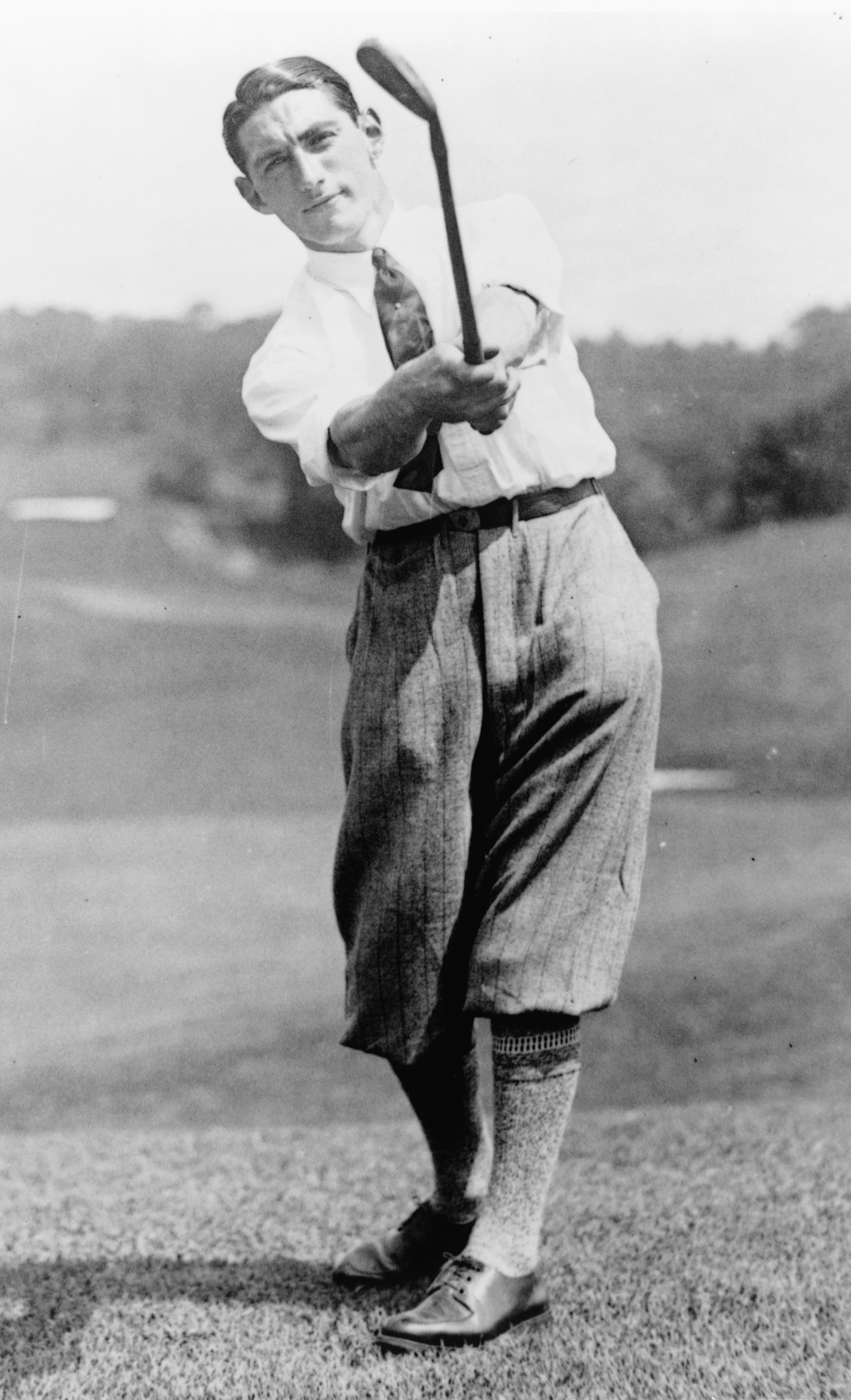
Tommy Armour

- A. G. G. Asher, sportsman.
- K. G. MacLeod, sportsman, Scottish Sports Hall of Fame.

=== Association football ===
- Arthur Benison Hubback, footballer
- R. H. Bruce Lockhart, footballer
- K. G. MacLeod, Manchester City FC.
- David Murray, chairman, Rangers Football Club

=== Cricketers ===
- James Anson, English cricketer.
- Kenneth Anson, English cricketer.
- Maurice Berkley, English cricketer.
- William Greenstock, South African cricketer.
- John Hall, Scottish cricketer.
- Thomas Herriot, English cricketer.
- Hesketh Hesketh-Prichard, English cricketer.
- Malcolm Jardine, English cricketer.
- Forbes Jones, Scottish cricketer.
- Alexander Lindsay, Scottish cricketer.
- K. G. MacLeod, Scottish cricketer.
- Ernest Mallinson, English cricketer.
- Neil Millar, English cricketer.
- David Riddell, Scottish cricketer.
- Edmund Thomson, English cricketer.
- John Turner, Scottish cricketer.
- Archibald Williamson, English cricketer.

=== Golfers ===
- Tommy Armour, golfer; winner of the Masters, The Open Championship, US Open and US PGA (1927–37).
- Charles Lawrie, Scottish golfer, R&A Administrator, golf course designer
- K. G. MacLeod, sportsman, Scottish Sports Hall of Fame.
- Donald Steel, golfer and course designer.

=== Rock climbing ===
- John Menlove Edwards, rock climber.

=== Rugby players ===
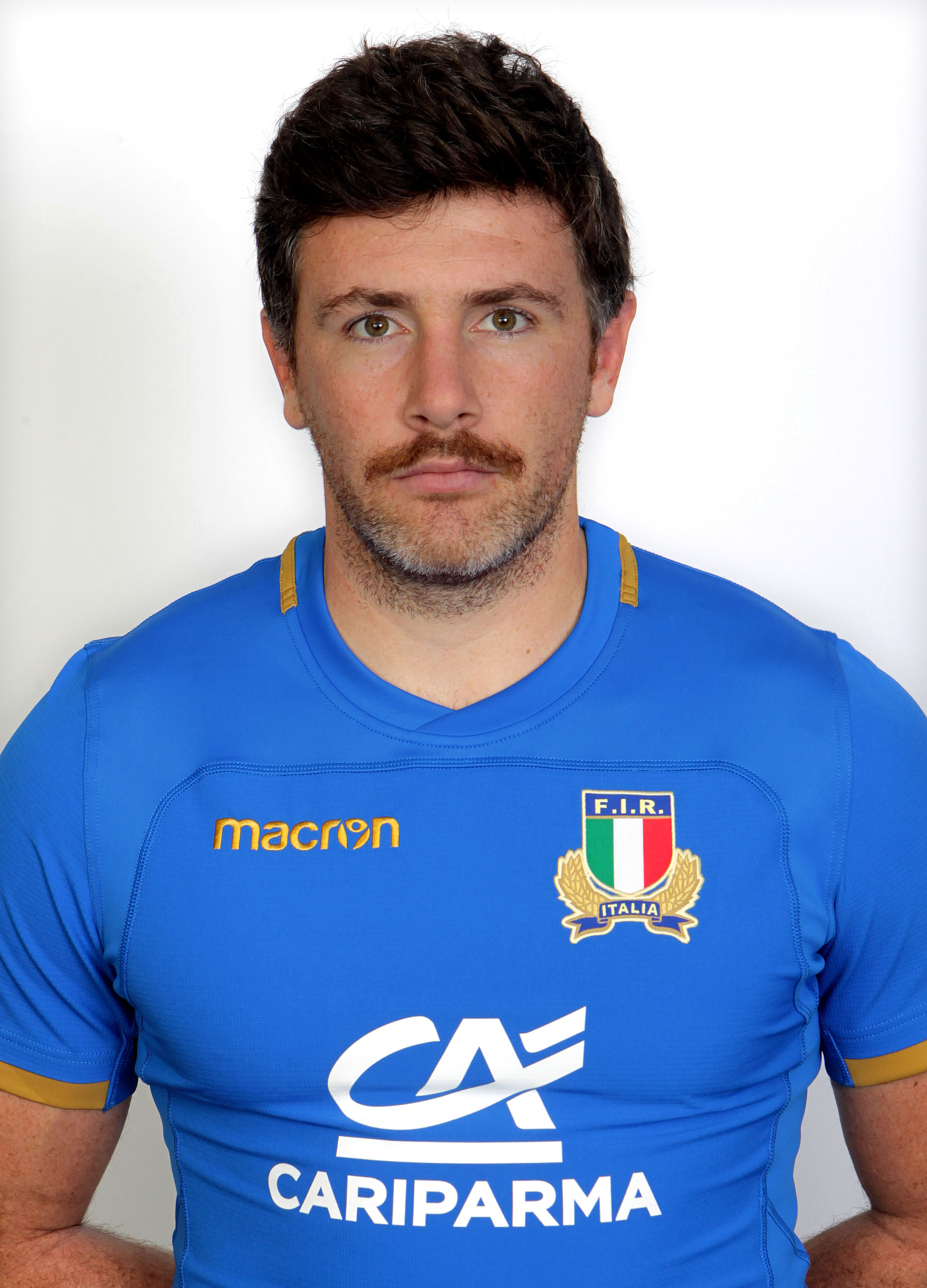
George Biagi

- David Bedell-Sivright, Scottish international.
- George Biagi, Italian/Scottish rugby player, Italian international.
- Frans ten Bos, Scottish international.
- Dunlop McCosh Cunningham, rugby internationalist.
- George Cunningham, rugby internationalist.
- Andrew Ramsay Don-Wauchope, rugby internationalist.
- Bill Gammell, Scottish international.
- Robert Henderson (physician), English international.
- Nelson Henderson, Scottish international.
- Frank Hunter, sportsman.
- Peter Lillington, Scottish international.
- Ian MacIntyre, rugby international
- David MacMyn, rugby international.
- George MacPherson, Scottish international.
- Justin Melck, rugby player for Western Province, the Super Rugby side Stormers, Munster Rugby and now Saracens.
- Douglas Monypenny, Scottish international.
- Harry Paterson, Scottish international and Edinburgh Rugby back.
- Lewis Robertson, Scottish international.
- William Patrick Scott, Scottish international.
- Gordon Waddell, rugby internationalist.
- Herbert Waddell, Scottish international.
- William Wotherspoon, rugby player.

=== Track and field ===
- Charlton Monypenny, sprinter.
- Jake Wightman, middle-distance runner.

== Business ==
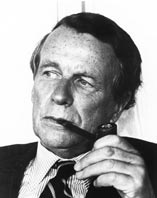
David Ogilvy

- Frans ten Bos, Dutch rugby player and businessman.
- Sandy Glen, Arctic explorer and pioneer of the package holiday.
- Richard Lambert, former editor of The Financial Times; former member of Bank of England MPC; former Director-General of Confederation of British Industry
- David Landale, taipan.
- David Murray, Chairman & Managing Director, Murray International Holdings; chairman, Rangers Football Club plc.
- David Ogilvy, founder of Ogilvy, Benson & Mather, advertising.
- David Reid, former Chairman of Tesco.
- Alastair Salvesen, billionaire businessman.
- Christian Salvesen, shipping line founder.
- John MacQueen Ward, businessman.

== Other ==
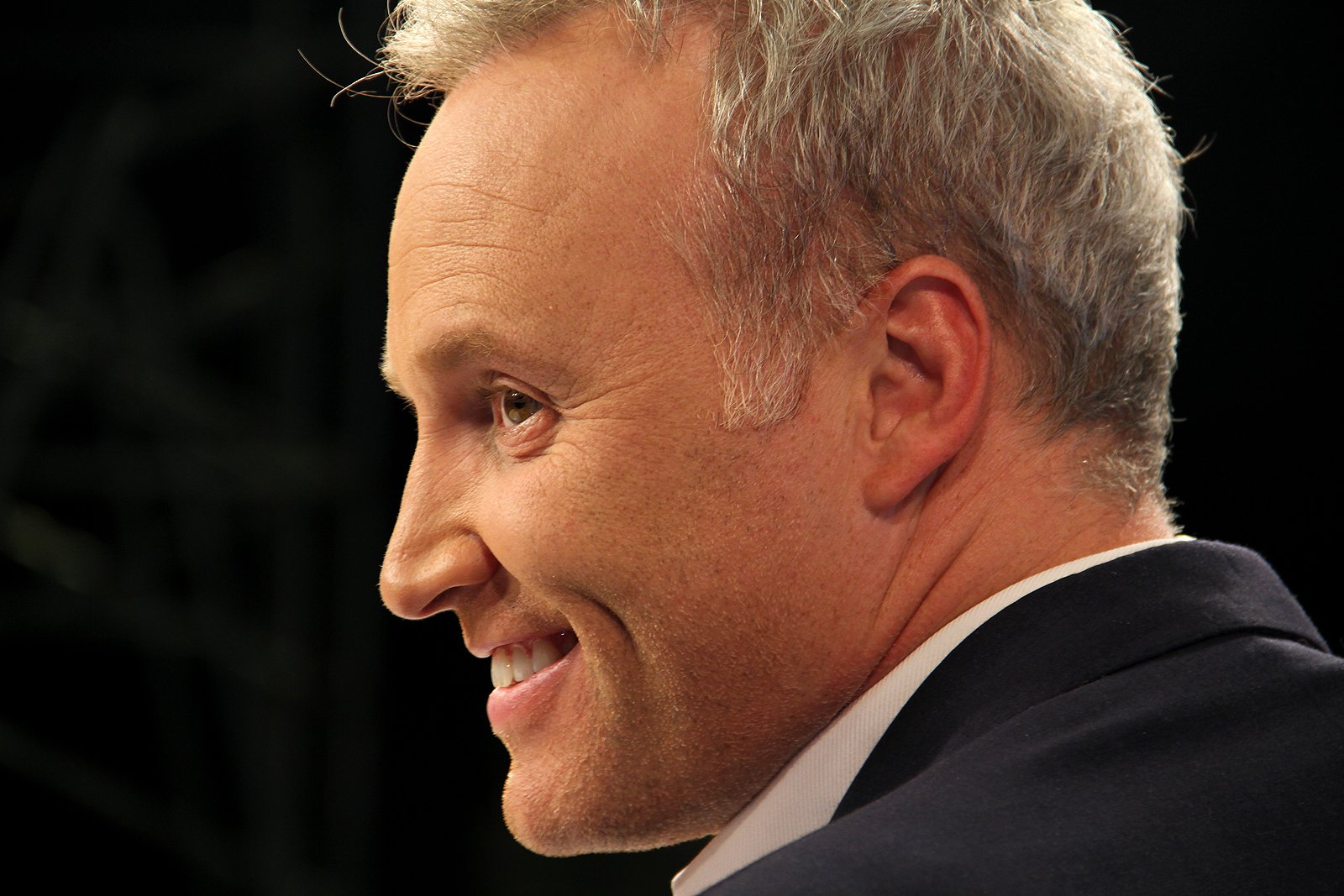
Joe Morrison

- John Arbuthnott, 16th Viscount of Arbuthnott
- Keith Arbuthnott, 15th Viscount of Arbuthnott
- John Morrison, 2nd Viscount Dunrossil
- Harold Barnwell, aviator.
- John Bryce, producer of The Avengers.
- Hesketh Hesketh-Prichard, explorer, adventurer, big-game hunter, marksman, military innovator and cricketer.
- Grenville Johnston, Lord Lieutenant of Moray.
- Alasdair Liddell, civil servant.
- Andrew K. McCosh, coal and steel administrator.
- Hamish McRae, journalist.
- Joe Morrison, TV Presenter.
- James Maurice Scott, explorer.
- Aylmer Vallance, newspaper editor.

== See also ==
The Category for Old Fettesians
