= Admiral Macdonald =

Admiral Macdonald may refer to:

- Bruce E. MacDonald (born 1955), U.S. Navy vice admiral
- Reginald Macdonald (1820–1899), British Royal Navy admiral
- Roderick Douglas Macdonald (1921–2001), British Royal Navy vice admiral
