= David Riddell =

Scottish cricketer and provost

Personal information
- Full name: David Adams Riddell
- Born: 30 September 1899; Glasgow, Lanarkshire, Scotland
- Died: 3 April 1957 (aged 57); Melbourne, Victoria, Australia
- Batting: Right-handed

Domestic team information
- Years: Team
- 1921–1922: Scotland

Career statistics
Competition	First-class
Matches	3
Runs scored	56
Batting average	11.20
100s/50s	–/–
Top score	32
Catches/stumpings	2/–
- Source: Cricinfo, 5 November 2022

David Adams Riddell (30 September 1899 – 3 April 1957) was a Scottish first-class cricketer.

Riddell was born at Glasgow in September 1899. He was educated at Fettes College, before matriculating to St John's College, Cambridge. He served during the First World War with the Machine Gun Corps, being commissioned as a temporary second lieutenant in October 1918, less than one month before the end of the war. A club cricketer for Greenock, Riddell made three appearances in first-class cricket for Scotland in 1921 and 1922, playing twice against Ireland and once against Surrey. He scored 56 runs in his three matches, at an average of 11.20, with a highest score of 32. Riddell later emigrated to Australia, where he died in the inner-Melbourne suburb of Fitzroy in April 1957.
