= Philip Baldwin =

British activist (born 1985)

- Born: 22 May 1985 (age 41)
- Education: Fettes College; Oriel College; Peterhouse, Cambridge
- Occupation: Human rights activist
- Organizations: General Synod of the Church of England; House of Laity

Philip Christopher Baldwin (born 22 May 1985) is a British gay human rights activist known for campaigning on LGBT and HIV awareness. He is a member of the House of Laity of the General Synod of the Church of England. The 2021 and 2022 Pride Power Lists included him.

== Early life and education ==
Philip Christopher Baldwin was born on 22 May 1985. Baldwin attended Fettes College, Edinburgh, from 1996 to 2003 where he experienced bullying and homophobia. Baldwin alleges a man tried to rape him in Glasgow in 2003. From 2003 to 2006, Baldwin studied history at Oriel College, University of Oxford. He then studied for an MPhil in the history of art and architecture at Peterhouse, Cambridge.

== Life and activism ==
Baldwin worked in financial services in London and New York from 2009 to 2015. In January 2010, at the age of 24, he was diagnosed with HIV. Baldwin is a former atheist and now practises Christianity. Baldwin has campaigned about LGBT rights, HIV, awareness and faith inclusion of LGBT people. He is an ambassador for the LGBT charity Stonewall. Other charity organisations he has worked with include Rainbow Migration, Positively UK, the Albert Kennedy Trust and the Terrence Higgins Trust. Lay members of the Deanery Synod elected Baldwin to the eleventh General Synod of the Church of England in 2021. Out News Global's 2022 Pride Power List placed Baldwin at number eighty-nine. DIVA Magazine’s 2024 Pride Power List placed him at number eighty-nine. and their 2025 Pride Power List placed him at number ninety-eight.

At the General Synod of the Church of England, Baldwin has spoken in favour of same-sex marriage and blessings in Church of England churches, stating that;

"Christianity is not about repression, hypocrisy and denial, but compassion and love."

He has also argued for enhanced safeguarding and in favour of assisted dying. He stated that;

"We must not allow assisted dying to become stigmatised, and force people to choose between a peaceful death and their faith."

He has criticised the Church of England’s lack of action around HIV in England and throughout the Anglican Communion.

He contributed a letter to Letters to My Younger Queer Self, published by HarperCollins in 2025.

Baldwin collects English portraiture from 1750 to 1780, including works by the founders of the Royal Academy of Arts. In 2014, Baldwin claimed that upon his death he will bequeath Portrait of the Artist’s Wife by Nathaniel Hone and Portrait of a Gentleman by Daniel Gardner to the Ashmolean Museum, the Fitzwilliam Museum and the National Portrait Gallery, London.

== Awards ==
- Diva Magazine Pride Power List 2023
- Diva Magazine Pride Power List 2024
- Diva Magazine Pride Power List 2025

== Bibliography ==
Letters to My Younger Queer Self, ed. Danial Harding, pp. 67–74 (2025)
