= Kenneth Anson =

English cricketer

Personal information
- Full name: Kenneth George Anson
- Born: 13 January 1913; Sevenoaks, Kent, England
- Died: 16 December 1993 (aged 80); Worthing, Sussex, England
- Batting: Unknown
- Bowling: Unknown
- Relatives: James Anson (brother)

Domestic team information
- Years: Team
- 1940/41: Europeans

Career statistics
| Competition | First-class |
|---|---|
| Matches | 1 |
| Runs scored | 5 |
| Batting average | 2.50 |
| 100s/50s | –/– |
| Top score | 4 |
| Balls bowled | 66 |
| Wickets | 1 |
| Bowling average | 44.00 |
| 5 wickets in innings | – |
| 10 wickets in match | – |
| Best bowling | 1/44 |
| Catches/stumpings | –/– |
- Source: ESPNcricinfo, 27 November 2022

Kenneth George Anson (13 January 1913 — 16 December 1993) was an English first-class cricketer and an officer in both the British Indian Army and the British Army.

Anson was born at Sevenoaks in January 1913 and was educated in Scotland at Fettes College. From there, he attended the Royal Military College, Sandhurst, graduating as a second lieutenant into the unattached list of the British Indian Army in February 1933.

He joined the British Indian Army on the 22 September 1934 and was appointed to the 2nd battalion, 8th Gurkha Rifles with promotion to lieutenant following in May 1935. He transferred to the Indian Army Ordnance Corps (on probation) on 9 May 1938.

Anson served in the Second World War, during which he was promoted to captain in February 1941.

While serving in British India during the war, Anson made a single appearance in first-class cricket for the Europeans cricket team against The Rest in the 1940–41 Bombay Pentangular Tournament. He took the wicket of Vijay Hazare in The Rest's first innings for the cost of 44 runs. Batting twice in the match from the middle order, he was dismissed for a single run by Jacob Harris in the Europeans first innings, while following-on in their second innings he was dismissed for 4 runs by the same bowler.

Following the war, he was promoted to major in July 1946. With Indian Independence in 1947, Anson was transferred from the now defunct British Indian Army to the British Army and the Royal Army Ordnance Corps, with him retiring from the army as a Major and honorary Lieutenant Colonel in February 1958. Anson died at Worthing in December 1993. His brother, James, was also a first-class cricketer.
