= Order of the Crown of Romania =

Romanian order of knighthood

Order of the Crown of Romania Ordinul Coroana României
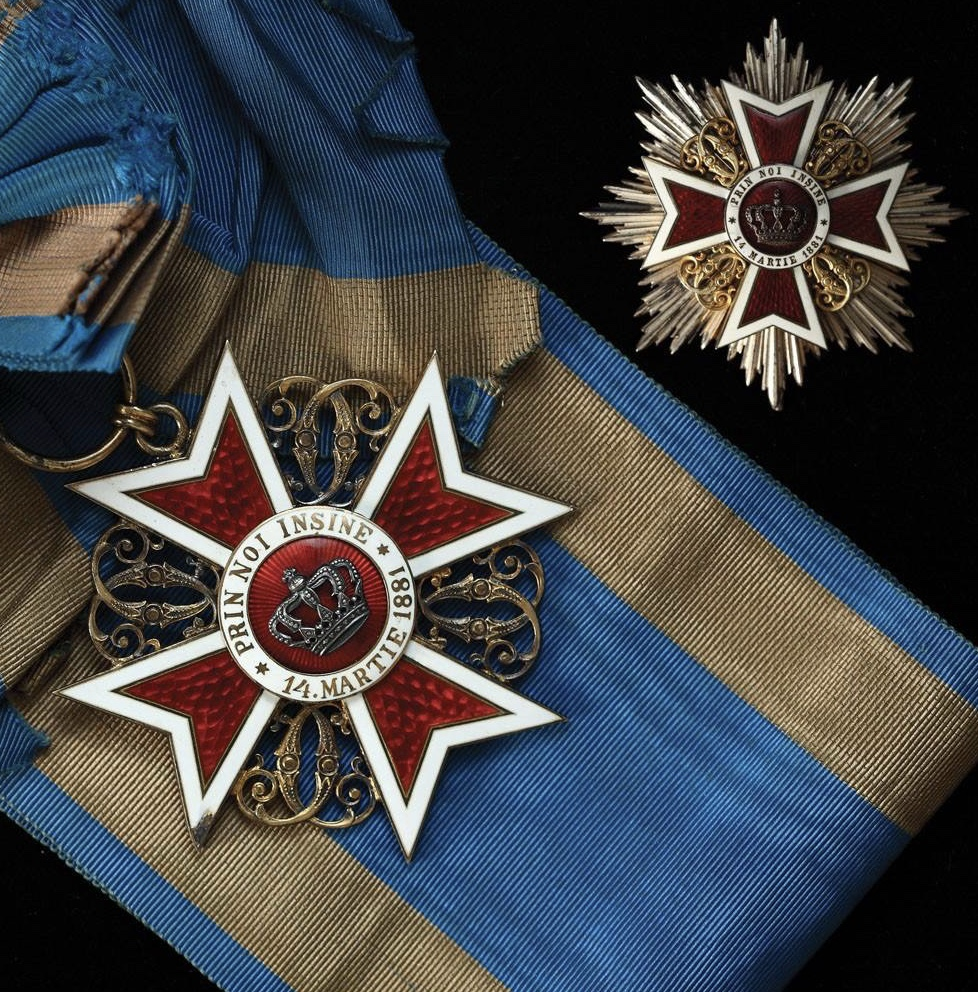
- Badge and sash of the order. Grand cross, Type 1.

Awarded by the King of Romania
- Type: Dynastic order
- Royal house: House of Romania
- Religious affiliation: Romanian Orthodox
- Ribbon: Light blue with silver stripes
- Motto: PRIN NOI INSINE (By ourselves)
- Awarded for: Conspicuous and special merit
- Status: Discontinued in 1947; revived in 2011
- Grades: Grand Cross, Grand Officer, Commander, Officer, Knight

Precedence
- Next (higher): Order of Carol I
- Next (lower): Royal Decoration of the Custodian of the Romanian Crown
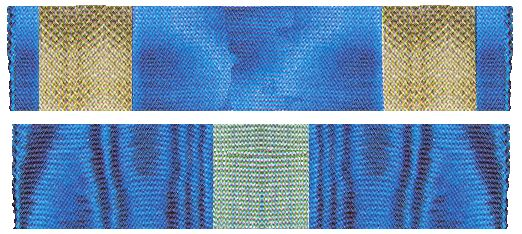
- The two ribbon bars of the order. Top: 1881-1932, 2011-present. Bottom: 1932-1947.

The Order of the Crown of Romania is a chivalric order set up on 14 March 1881 by King Carol I of Romania to commemorate the establishment of the Kingdom of Romania. It was awarded as a state order until the end of the Romanian monarchy in 1947. It was revived on 30 December 2011 as a dynastic order.

== Classes ==
The order had five classes. For most classes, the number of recipients living at any time was limited. However, this only applied to recipients having a Romanian citizenship - awards to foreign personnel were not counted in those numbers.

=== Classes and number of recipients ===
==== 1881 ====
At first, the number of living Romanian recipients at any time was limited to the following:

- Grand Cross (limited to 25)
- Grand Officer (limited to 80)
- Commander (limited to 150)
- Officer (limited to 300)
- Knight (unlimited numbers)

==== 1932 ====
In 1932, the maximum number of living Romanian recipients at any time was increased:

- Grand Cross (limited to 150)
- Grand Officer (limited to 300)
- Commander (limited to 500)
- Officer (limited to 1500)
- Knight (unlimited numbers)

==== 1938 (civilian) ====
In February 1938, the maximum number of living Romanian recipients at any time was increased for the civilian version of the order:

- Grand Cross (limited to 200)
- Grand Officer (limited to 400)
- Commander (limited to 1000)
- Officer (limited to 2000)
- Knight (unlimited numbers)

==== 1938 (military) ====
In 1938, a new version of the order was created specifically for military personnel. It featured a crown between the cross and the ribbon. The following maximum total numbers of living Romanian recipients at any time were ruled at the time of creation. Awards in war time were not counted among the number.

- Grand Cross (limited to 50)
- Grand Officer (limited to 100)
- Commander (limited to 250)
- Officer (limited to 500)
- Knight (unlimited numbers)

== Insignia ==
=== General ===
Grand Cross members wore the decoration on a sash from the right shoulder to left waist. Grand Officers and Commanders wore the medal around the neck, and Knights and Officers on the chest to the left side on a ribbon. For the two highest classes of the order, an eight-pointed silver star was additionally worn on the chest to the left: The Grand Cross star featured a depiction of an entire Maltese cross, while the Grand Officer star only featured the centerpiece of the order, surrounded by four crowns after the 1932 redesign.

The orders were awarded in cases of issue featuring the ruling king's monogram on the top lid. In the first years, various colours of cases can be found. At least since the rule of Ferdinand I., the cases of the Order of the Crown were uniformly coloured blue. Starting in the late 1920s, the type and class of the respective order were additionally written outside on the top lid of the case of issue, directly underneath the king's monogram.

=== Decoration ===
==== Before 1932 (Type 1) ====
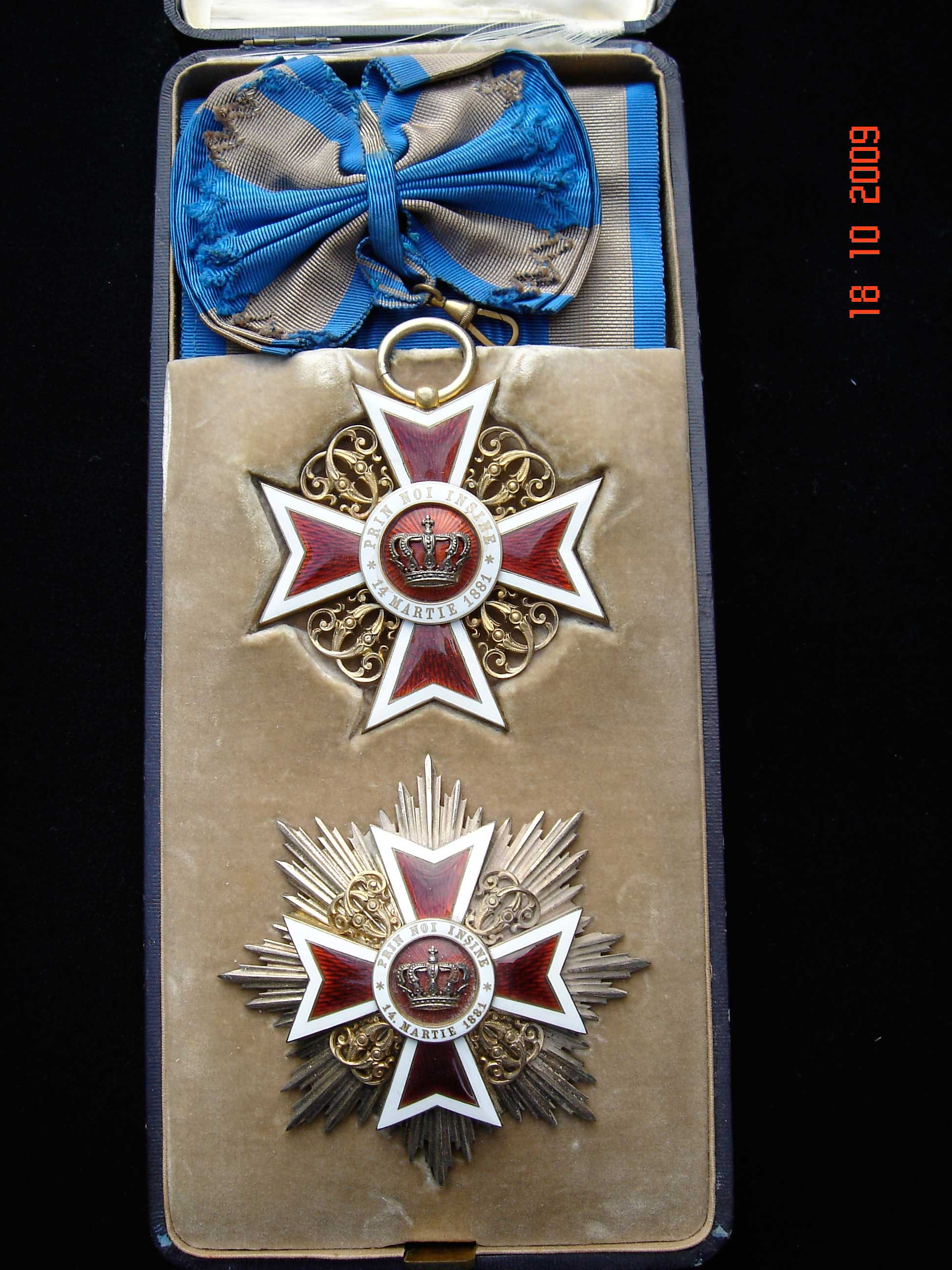
Grand Cross, civilian, type 1, in original box

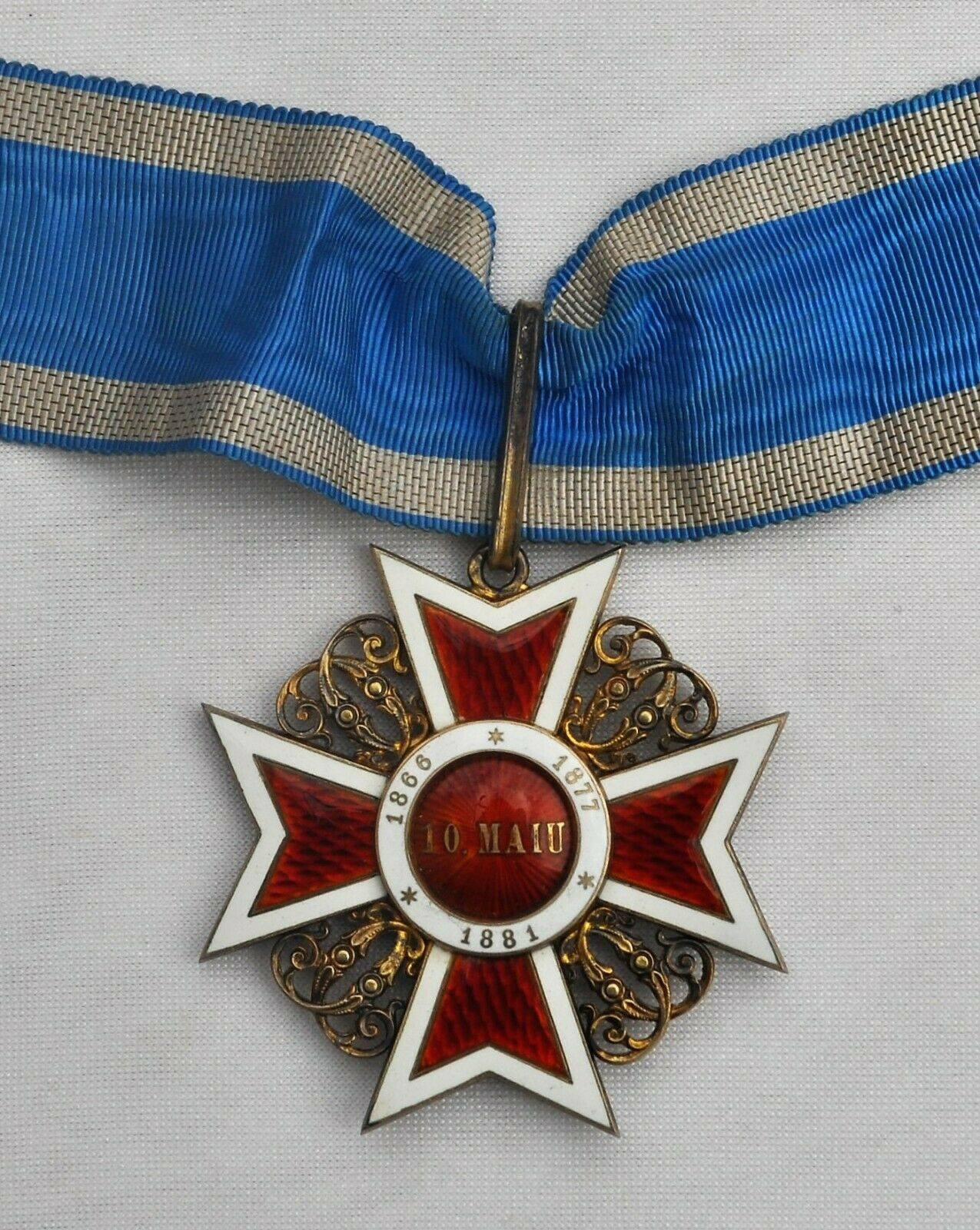
Commander (reverse), civilian, type 1

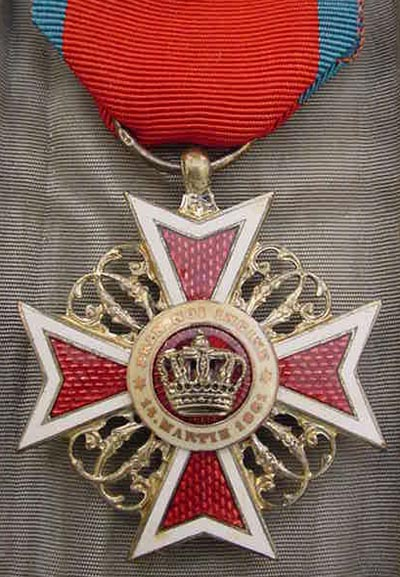
Knight: Civilian, type 1, on a ribbon for military bravery, an atypical combination.

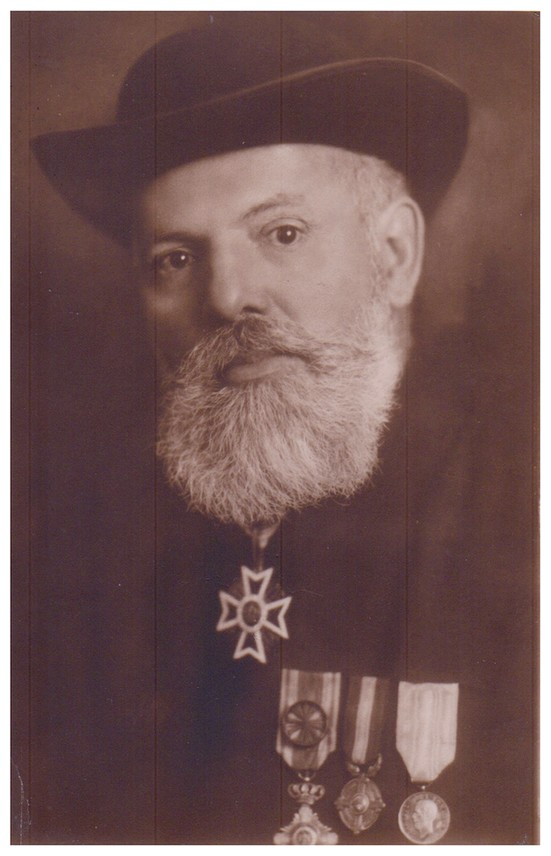
Alexandru Munteanu, Commander, civilian, type 1.

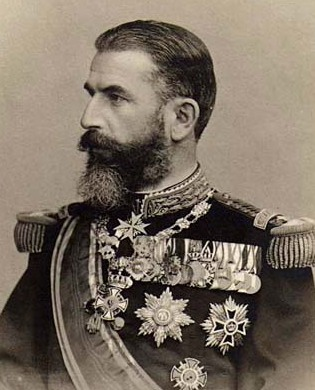
Carol I, king of Romania, wearing the star of the Grand Cross type 1 (to the right).

The model of 1881 features a red-enamelled, eight-pointed Maltese Cross with wider margin of gold and white. In the angles of the cross were "C"s, the initials of the founder. The medallion in the middle of the cross shows the Romanian royal crown on a dark red background. The medallion is surrounded by a white-frost edge surrounded the inscription PRIN NOI INSINE (by ourselves) and the order's foundation date of 14 March 1881. On the back of the medallion, there is the writing "10. Maiu" (10 May), the National Day. It is surrounded by the years 1866 (enthronement of Carol and the foundation of the Romanian dynasty), 1877 (proclamation of Romanian fully independence), 1881 (proclamation of the Kingdom and of Carol as King of Romania).

The ribbon and grand cross sash are light blue with two silver stripes on each side.

From 12 December 1916, the order was also awarded in a version for merit in war time featuring two crossed swords. It could also be awarded on a special ribbon "for military bravery". That ribbon was red with blue stripes.

Type 1 awards were mostly supplied to the Romanian Government by Bucarest-based jeweller Joseph Resch, whose logo appears in the cases of issue. Resch distributed orders made by several companies outside of Romania. In Austria, many Orders of the Crown were produced by jeweller Rozet & Fischmeister, and there are numerous versions likely manufactured in France. There were many distinct variations between manufacturers over the years that are differentiated by collectors.

==== After 1932 (Type 2) ====
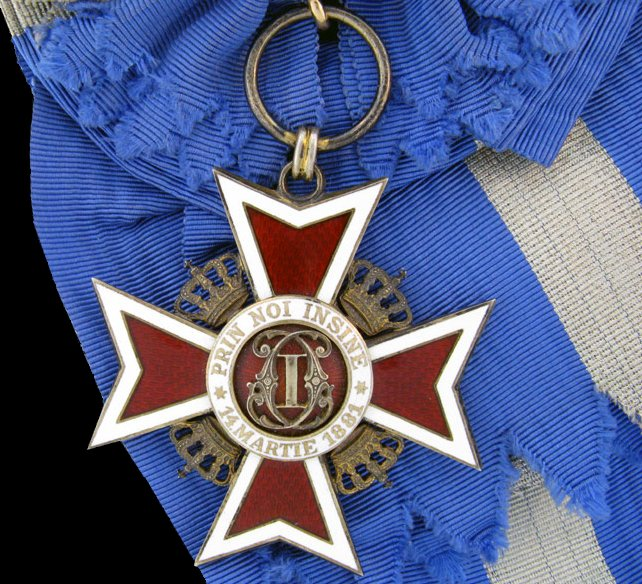
Grand Cross badge, civilian, type 2.

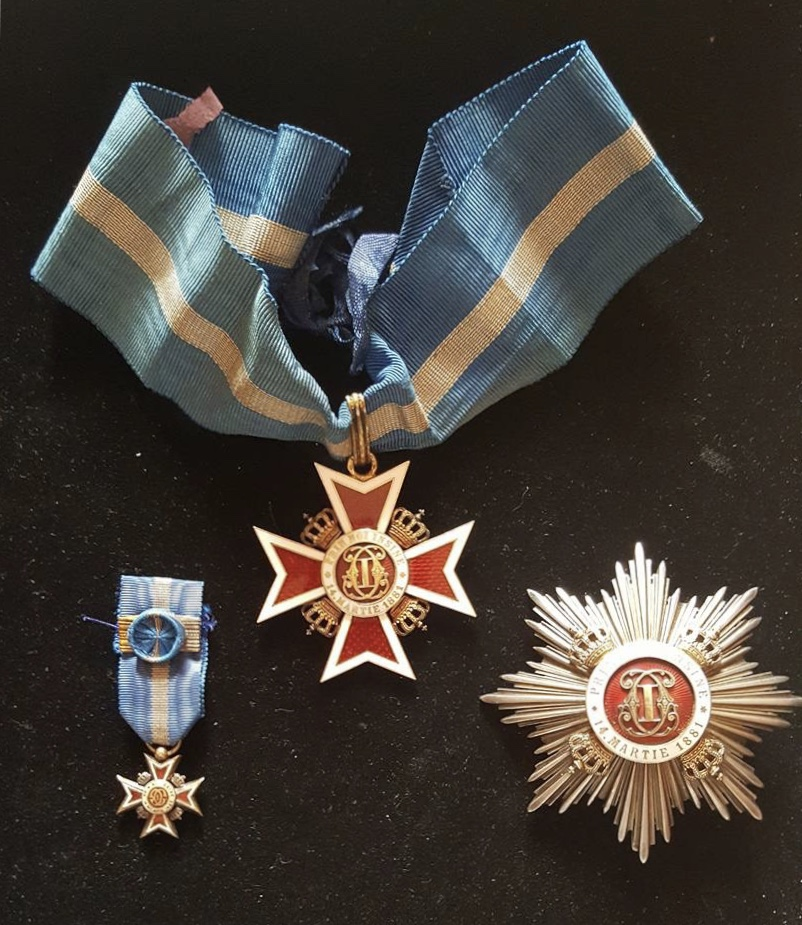
Grand Officer. Left: Officer (miniature). Civilian, type 2.

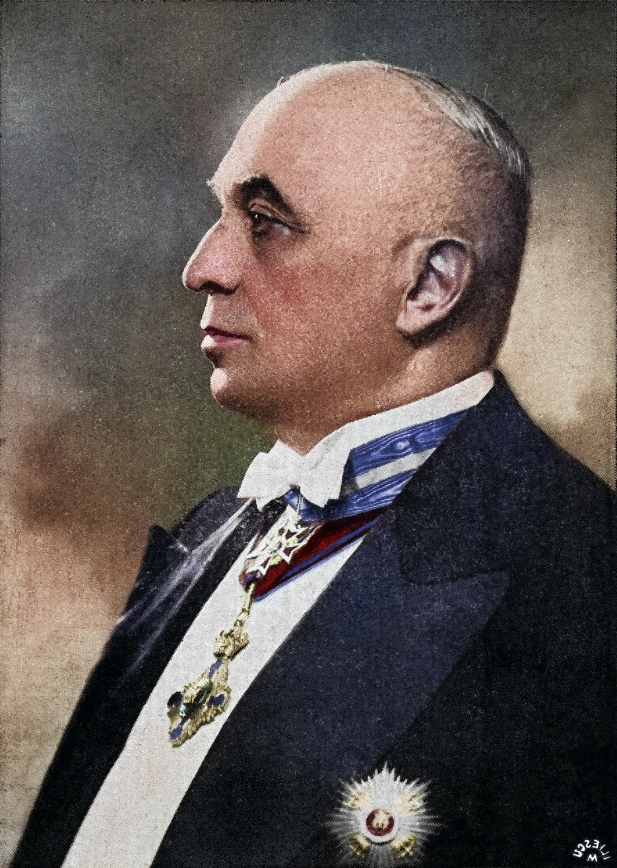
Dr. Dimitrie Tușinschi, Grand Officer, civilian, type 2, awarded in 1936.

In 1932, the order was redesigned in all classes. In the center, the crown was replaced by the initial of Carol I., while between the cross arms, there were now four crowns. The size of higher classes was slightly decreased. Some very rare, early Type 2 medals (likely produced in 1932) were made by adding a new inner medalion and the four crowns to Type 1 medals. They are recognizable by being larger Type 1 sizes.

The ribbons were given a redesign: They were now blue with one grey bar in the middle.

==== 1938 (Type 2 military) ====
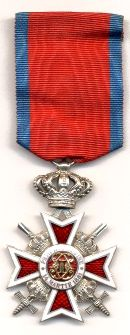
Knight's Cross, military, type 2, crossed swords signifying a war time award.

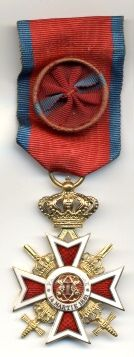
Officer's Cross, military, type 2, crossed swords signifying a war time award.

From February 1937, it was decided that - in case of war - the order could be awarded in a version with crossed swords for war time merits. In 1938, a version for members of the military was created, featuring an additional crown between the cross and the ribbon. From December 1938, it was decided that in war time, the order would be awarded with crossed swords and a ribbon featuring two additional golden bars on both sides. From June 1941, the order could also be awarded on a "ribbon for military bravery" in all grades. That ribbon was red with two blue stripes on the sides.

Most type 2 medals prior to approx. 1941 were supplied by Joseph Resch or Bijouteria Weiss in Bucarest, each labeling the respective cases of issue on the inner lid with their logo. Resch apparently distributed medals produced by C. F. Zimmermann in Pforzheim, while Weiss distributed ones made by Souval in Vienna. Most later, WW2 era cases feature the supplier "Monetaria Nationala" (National Mint) in the inner lid, and contained medals manufactured by C. F. Zimmermann in Pforzheim.

== Recipients ==
=== Grand Cross ===
- Ibrahim of Johor
- Prince Lorenz of Belgium, Archduke of Austria-Este
- Princess Alice, Duchess of Gloucester
- Princess Muna al-Hussein
- Jean-Baptiste Billot
- Nicolae Ciupercă
- Arved Crüger
- Joseph Dietrich
- John Dill
- Max von Fabeck
- Henry Ford
- Josef Harpe
- William Horwood
- Constantin Isopescu-Grecul
- August Kanitz
- Živojin Mišić
- Hendrik Pieter Nicolaas Muller
- Mihailo Petrović
- Radomir Putnik
- Jovan Mišković
- Lt.-col. Constantin C. Roșescu, participant in Operation Autonomous
- Radu R. Rosetti
- Nicholas Medforth-Mills
- Lech Wałęsa, 2nd President of Poland
- George Julian Zolnay

=== Grand Officer class ===
- Dhimitër Beratti
- Katō Hiroharu (1920) Rear Admiral, Imperial Japanese Navy

=== Commander class ===
- Erich Abraham
- Sir Clive Alderton, Private Secretary to the King of the United Kingdom
- Arthur Irving Andrews (1878–1967), American college professor. Awarded c. 1929 for "historical writings on Rumanian subjects".
- Henry Bond (1873–1919), British Army officer
- John Hall (1871–1953), British Army officer
- Kurt Lottner
- Gheorghe Manoliu

=== Order class ===
- Kennedy, Clyde McLean Awarded July 1919 - Lieutenant 20th Battalion (CEF)
