= John Hall (British Army officer, born 1871) =

Scottish cricketer and soldier

Brigadier-General John Hall CMG DSO
- Born: John Hamilton Hall; 23 February 1871; Harrou, North-West Frontier Province, British India
- Died: 12 April 1953 (aged 82); Broadstone, Dorset, England
- Cricket career

Cricket information
- Batting: Unknown
- Role: Wicket-keeper

Domestic team information
- Years: Team
- 1897/98: Europeans

Career statistics
Competition	First-class
Matches	2
Runs scored	7
Batting average	2.33
100s/50s	–/–
Top score	4
Catches/stumpings	5/1
- Source: ESPNcricinfo, 29 October 2023

John Hamilton Hall CMG DSO (23 February 1871 – 12 April 1953) was British Army officer and a Scottish first-class cricketer.

== Life and military career ==
The son of the soldier John Greive Hall, he was born in British India at Harrou in February 1871. He was educated in Scotland at Fettes College, before attending the Royal Military College, Sandhurst. He graduated from there into the Middlesex Regiment in November 1891, with promotion to lieutenant following in November 1892. Whilst serving in British India, Hall made two appearances in first-class cricket for the Europeans cricket team, with both matches coming against the Parsees in the 1897–98 Bombay Presidency Matches. Playing as a wicket-keeper, he took five catches and made a single stumping. He was promoted to captain in March 1900, with Hall serving in the Second Boer War 1899 to 1902; following the end of the war, he remained in South Africa and held the positions of both deputy-assistant quartermaster general and deputy assistant adjutant general until 1907. He was promoted to major in February 1908, and was later appointed assistant inspector of recruiting for the Eastern Command in 1913 and 1914.

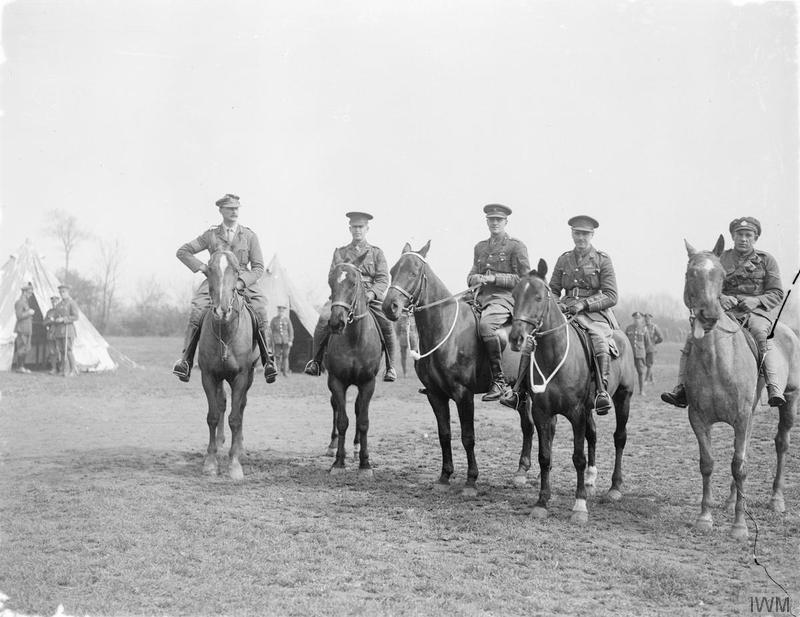
Brigadier-General James Heriot-Maitland, GOC of the 98th Infantry Brigade, 33rd Division, with officers of the 1st Battalion, Middlesex Regiment, near Cassel, 25 April 1918. Lieutenant Colonel John Hamilton Hall, CO 1st Middlesex, is second from the left.

Hall served with the Middlesex Regiment during the First World War. He was highly decorated in the war, being awarded the Distinguished Service Order in September 1916 and gaining a bar to his DSO in June 1917, with both citations commending his strong leadership. Additionally, he was mentioned in dispatches on four occasions during the war, and was made a companion of the Order of St Michael and St George in the 1918 New Year Honours. Hall was promoted to lieutenant colonel in December 1916, having commanded the 16th Battalion. He was later seconded to command a battalion of the Royal Lancaster Regiment in February 1918, a command he held until May of the same year. In October 1918, he was made a temporary brigadier-general whilst in command of a brigade, relinquishing this appointment following the war in August 1919. In September 1919, he was decorated by the Kingdom of Romania with the Order of the Crown of Romania for his service in the war.

Having been promoted to colonel in September 1920, Hall was placed in command of the record office at Lichfield between 1921 and 1925, during which time he was promoted to colonel in September 1920. Hall retired from active service in February 1925, at which point he was granted the honorary rank of brigadier general.

He died at the age of 82 in April 1953 at Broadstone, Dorset.
