= James Anson =

English cricketer

Personal information
- Full name: James William Anson
- Born: 9 January 1915; Mardan, North-West Frontier Province, British India
- Died: 14 January 1995 (aged 80); Maidstone, Kent, England
- Batting: Unknown
- Bowling: Unknown
- Relatives: Kenneth Anson (brother)

Domestic team information
- Years: Team
- 1938/39–1939/40: Sindh

Career statistics
Competition	First-class
Matches	6
Runs scored	162
Batting average	16.20
100s/50s	–/–
Top score	49
Balls bowled	18
Wickets	0
Bowling average	–
5 wickets in innings	–
10 wickets in match	–
Best bowling	–
Catches/stumpings	1/–
- Source: Cricinfo, 28 November 2022

James William Anson CBE (9 January 1915 — 14 January 1995) was an English first-class cricketer and businessman. His brother, Kenneth Anson, was also a first-class cricketer.

== Life ==
Anson was born in British India at Mardan in January 1915. He was educated in Scotland at Fettes College, before matriculating to Caius College, Cambridge. After graduating from Cambridge, he went to British India where he worked in the shipping industry.

While in India, he played first-class cricket on six occasions from 1938 to 1947. His first two appearances came for Sind in the Ranji Trophy, with his remaining four matches coming for the personal eleven's of Sir Homi Mehta and K. C. Ibrahim. In his six matches, he scored 162 runs at an average of 16.20, with a highest score of 49. Prior to going to India, he had played second eleven cricket for Kent from 1933 to 1936.

During the Second World War, he was emergency commissioned with the rank of second lieutenant into the British Indian Army as of 25 June 1940. Anson was later made a CBE in the 1969 Birthday Honours, as which point he was the managing director of Mackinnon Mackenzie and Company in Bombay.

He returned to England in his later life, where he died at Maidstone in January 1995.
