= Roderick Macdonald (Royal Navy officer) =

Royal Navy Vice Admiral (1921–2001)

Vice-Admiral Sir Roderick Macdonald KBE
- Born: 25 February 1921; Batavia, Java
- Died: 19 January 2001 (aged 79); Portree, Scotland
- Military career
- Allegiance: United Kingdom
- Branch: Royal Navy
- Service years: 1939 - 1979
- Rank: Vice-Admiral
- Commands: Naval Forces in Borneo; HMS Bristol
- Conflicts: World War II; Indonesian Confrontation; Cyprus Emergency
- Awards: Knight Commander of the Order of the British Empire; Mentioned in Despatches
- Other work: Artist

Vice-Admiral Sir Roderick Douglas Macdonald KBE (25 February 1921 – 19 January 2001) was Chief of Staff of Naval Home Command.

== Naval career ==
Educated at Fettes College, Macdonald joined the Royal Navy in 1939. He saw action during World War II during the Norwegian Campaign. After the War he commanded various ships and was mentioned in dispatches for actions against EOKA. Between 1965 and 1966 he commanded naval forces in Borneo. During the early 1970s he commanded HMS Bristol.

In 1973 he was appointed Chief of Staff Naval Home Command and then in 1976 he became Chief of Staff of Allied Naval Forces Southern Europe at NATO. He retired in 1979.

== Later career ==
In retirement he became a distinguished artist and retired to his home on the Isle of Skye where he was chieftain of the annual Highland games. In 1993, his book 'The Figurehead' was published detailing his early war time career in the Royal Navy ISBN 978-1-85821-056-8. He is buried in Portree cemetery on Skye.
