= Fettes College =

School in Edinburgh, Scotland

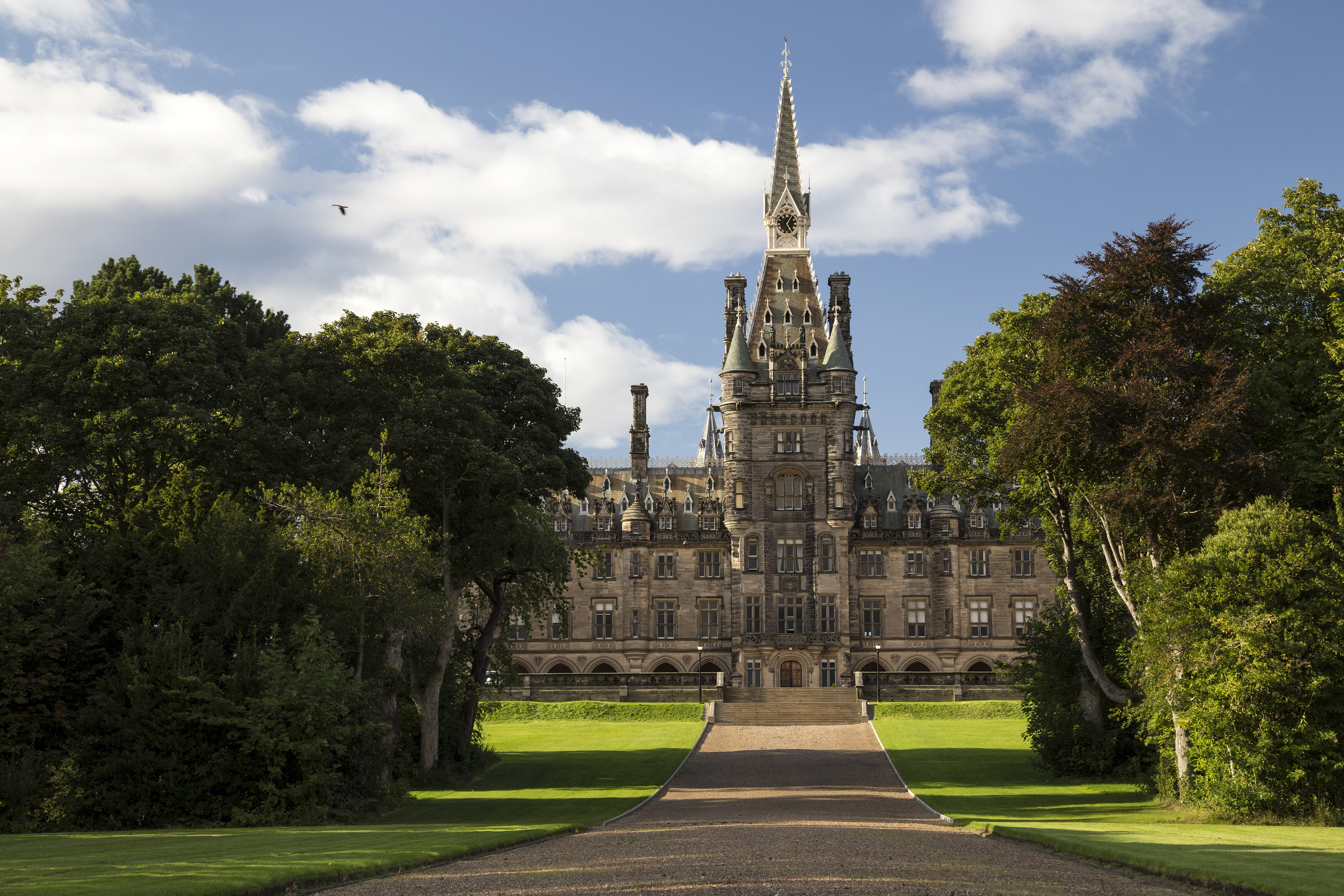
- Coat of arms of Fettes College (top); Fettes College building (below)

Location
- Carrington Road; Edinburgh, EH4 1QX; Scotland; 55°57′49″N 03°13′34″W

Information
- Type: Public school Private day and boarding school
- Mottoes: Industria; A place to live. A place to learn. A place to grow.
- Established: 1870; 156 years ago
- Founder: Sir William Fettes
- School board: Board of Governors
- Trust: Fettesian Trust
- Chair of Governors: John Edward
- Headmaster: Richard Girvan
- Gender: Mixed
- Age: 4.5 to 18
- Houses: Carrington, Glencorse, Kimmerghame, Moredun, Arniston, College East, College West, Dalmeny, Craigleith
- Colours: Chocolate & Magenta
- Song: Floreas Fettesia
- Mascot: Bee
- Publication: The Fettesian, Busy Bee, The Gargoyle, The Atlas
- Feeder schools: Fettes Preparatory School
- Alumni: Old Fettesians (OFs)
- Nobel laureates: Sir Angus Deaton
- Website: www.fettes.com

Fettes College (/ˈfɛtɪs/) is a co-educational private boarding and day school in Craigleith, Edinburgh, Scotland, with over two-thirds of its pupils in residence on campus. The school was originally a boarding school for boys only and became co-ed in 1983. In 1978 the College had a nine-hole golf course, an ice-skating rink used in winter for ice hockey and in summer as an outdoor swimming pool, a cross-country running track, and a rifle shooting range within the forested 300-acre (120-hectare) grounds. Fettes is sometimes referred to as a public school, although that term was traditionally used in Scotland for state schools.

The school was founded with a bequest of Sir William Fettes in 1870 and started admitting girls in 1970. It follows the English rather than the Scottish education system and has nine boarding houses. The main building, called the Bryce Building, was designed by David Bryce.

The school is included in The Schools Index as one of the 150 best private schools in the world and among the top 30 senior schools in the UK. In 2026, it ranked as the top International Baccalaureate school in Scotland, and in the top 10 of the UK at 38 points average.

The Scottish Child Abuse Inquiry found evidence of historical sexual and physical abuse at Fettes College, including incidents reported to have occurred in the 1980s, which were also highlighted in BBC News coverage.

== History ==
=== Establishment ===
To perpetuate the memory of his only son William, who had predeceased him to typhoid in 1815, Sir William Fettes (1750–1836), a former Lord Provost of Edinburgh and a wealthy city merchant, bequeathed the then very large sum of £166,000 to be set aside for the education of poor children and orphans.

After his death the bequest was invested, and the accumulated sum was then used to acquire the 350 acres of land, to build the main building and to found the school in 1870 for the ‘the maintenance, education and outfit of young people’. Fettes College opened with 53 pupils (40 were Foundation Scholars with 11 others boarding and two day pupils). Following serious fires, the swimming baths were rebuilt in 1890 and the chemistry laboratory was rebuilt in 1897. The cricket pavilion was completed in 1906.

=== War years ===
In summer 1914 the school's summer camp at Barry had to be abandoned when both the commanding officer and the adjutant were called up for service in the First World War. Of the 2,000 former pupils who had by then been educated at the school, 1,094 served in the armed forces, and 246 died during their war service. In 1921 a war memorial designed by Birnie Rhind, bearing the inscription "carry on", was unveiled by Major-General Sir William Macpherson in the school grounds. A central heating system was first introduced in the main building in 1920, and electric light was first introduced in the school in 1924.

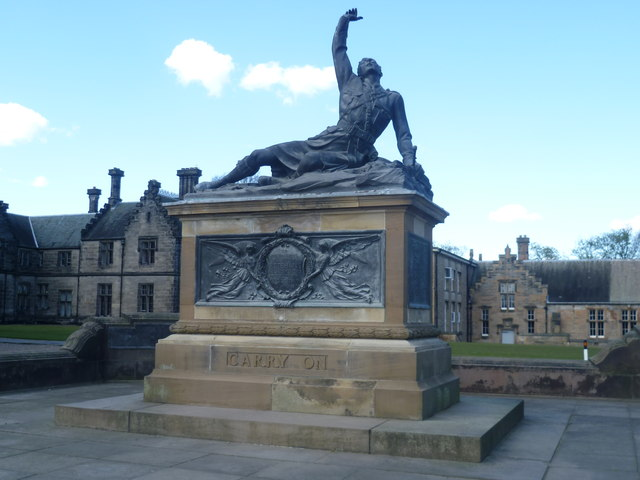
Fettes College War Memorial

In October 1939, early in the Second World War, the school had its first experience of hostilities when a German Junkers Ju 88 flew low over the school playing fields en route to bomb Rosyth Dockyard. Kimmerghame House was requisitioned for use as a section of the mine research unit HMS Vernon. A total of 118 former boys died in the Second World War. In the mid-1940s Sean Connery, a milkman with the St. Cuthbert's Co-operative Society, delivered milk to the school in the mornings.

The school chapel was enlarged by adding a chancel and a gallery in 1948. A new school running track was opened in 1954 giving a boost to athletics at the school, and Queen Elizabeth II and the Duke of Edinburgh visited the school in 1955.

=== Land and admission changes ===
In the early 1960s the school was required to sell 18 acres of land to allow Telford College to be built and to sell 14 acres for a new headquarters for Lothian and Borders Police. Following a public inquiry in 1965 the school was also forced to sell 15 acres of land to allow Broughton High School to be re-built. A new dining hall was opened in 1966 and a new school library was opened in 1970. The Queen Mother also opened a new science school in 1970.

An all-boys school until 1970, when female pupils were first admitted for the final year, Fettes became fully co-educational in 1983. In 1988 the school sold 13 acres of land to McCarthy & Stone for residential use for £3 million: the proceeds were used by the school to finance the refurbishment of the boys' houses.

=== Recent history ===
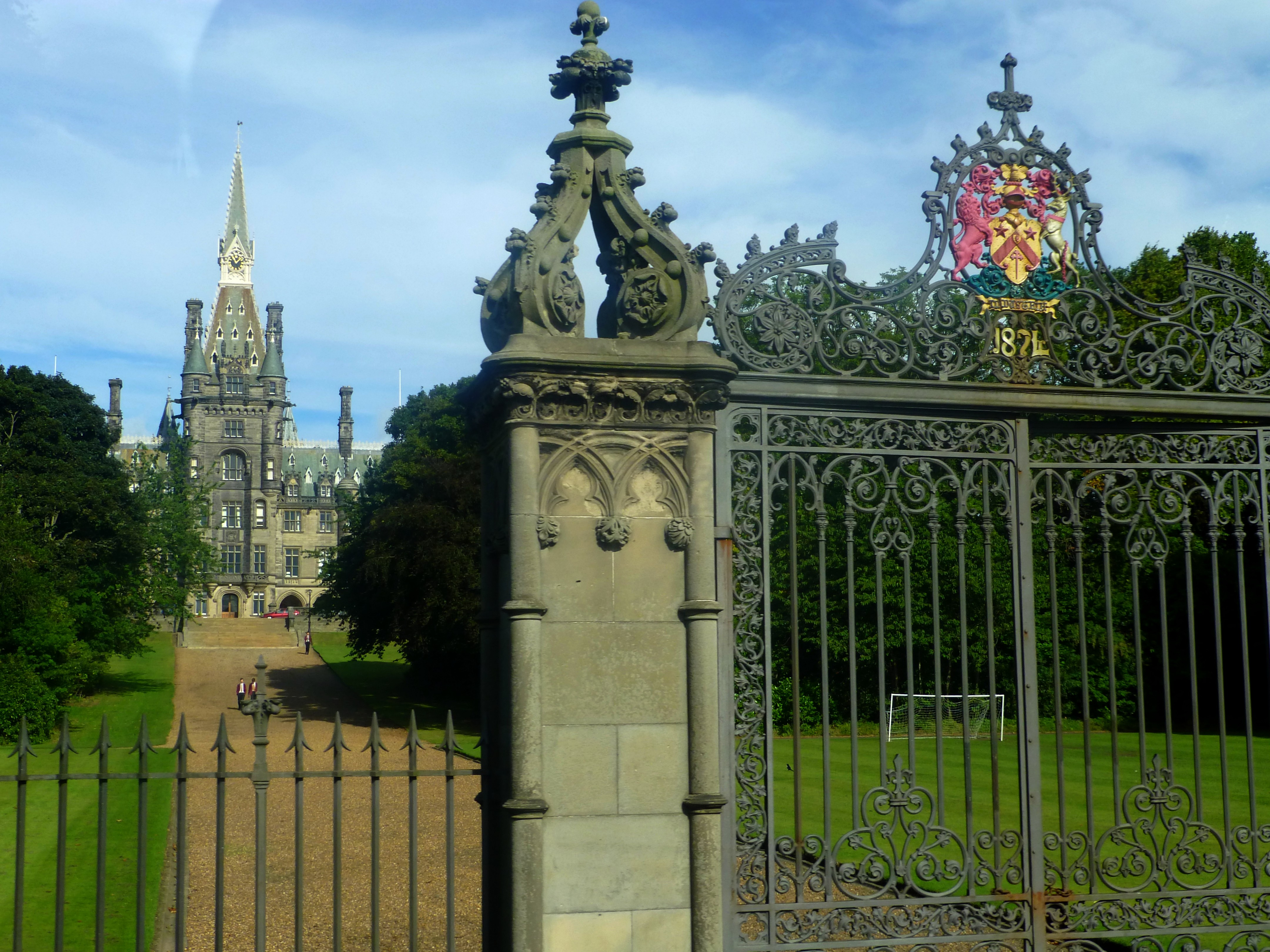
View of the school and entrance in 2013

In the late 1990s the school performed particularly well academically: in 1998 Fettes was placed fourth in The Daily Telegraph's league table of schools. In 1999 Fettes was placed fifth in the Sunday Times list of top mixed independent schools in the UK and in 2001 Fettes was declared "Scottish School of the year" by the Sunday Times.

In March 2009 Fettes won the Scottish Schools U18 Rugby Cup, at Murrayfield Stadium, for the first time and in April 2009 Her Majesty's Inspectorate of Education (HMIE) published a report on Fettes that evaluated the school as "excellent" in four out of five Quality Indicators and "very good" in the other.

It is said that Fettes "used to have a hearty, rugger-bugger, Caledonian image". Some journalists have described Fettes as "the Eton of the North". Former headmaster Michael Spens jokingly countered on a BBC documentary that "Eton College was the Fettes of the South!"

In 2020 and 2021 six men accused Iain Wares, who had taught at Fettes and Edinburgh Academy, of physical and sexual abuse at the schools when they were pupils in the 1970s. The Scottish Crown Prosecution Service was initially reluctant to prosecute the alleged abuser because of difficulties in seeking his extradition from South Africa—he had moved there—and his advanced age, but South Africa approved the UK's extradition request, on six charges of lewd, indecent and libidinous practices and behaviour and one of indecent assault, in 2020. The lawyer representing Fettes made "a full and unreserved apology" to former pupils who had suffered abuse. The perpetrator admitted the abuse, and was fighting extradition from South Africa to Scotland in 2022, and remained, free, in South Africa as of November 2023. One former pupil was awarded £450,000 in damages in 2022 for abuse suffered at the School.

In 2022 a former pupil, who attended Fettes Junior School and Fettes College as a day student in the 1970s and 1980s, claimed he was abused while at the junior school. Speaking to Scotland Tonight the man said he was beaten and sexually abused by a teacher. He claimed he was targeted when he was aged 12 because he was "more developed, and reached puberty before lots of the other boys". The matter was discussed in the BBC Radio 4 series In Dark Corners with Alex Renton, which spoke to dozens of former pupils who alleged they were abused by teachers at Fettes College and at Edinburgh Academy. In 2023, the school was featured on the BBC Panorama documentary "My Teacher the Abuser: Fighting for Justice". In the documentary boys spoke of sexual and physical abuse committed by Wares, which the former students claimed was covered up. One former student stated in the documentary that he had contacted the school and they were not interested in helping to locate the teacher. It was also claimed that the school provided an excellent reference for the abusive teacher.

In 2025, the school received an unscheduled inspection by Education Scotland, with findings published by on 2 September 2025. The findings by His Majesty's Inspectorate of School in Scotland were generally positive: "Curriculum: excellent, Learning, teaching and assessment: very good, Ensuring wellbeing, equality and inclusion: very good, Raising attainment and achievement: excellent".

==== Expansions ====
The Spens Building, named in honour of former Headmaster Michael Spens, was completed in 2017 and was commissioined to house the maths, modern languages, and art departments. It accommodated Sixth Form art studios, an art library, gallery space, a photography darkroom, and four 1:1 language oral practice rooms. Joined with the former North Building, it also houses the economics and geography departments, alongside the Cullachy Music School. The Spens Building won the 2017 Scottish Design Awards.

The Allardice Centre was built and named to commemorate the legacy of the businessman, David Allardice, in 2025, the new-build combining a fully accessible medical centre alongside a wellbeing department. The centre was recognised for its low carbon design.

== Overview ==
=== Curriculum ===
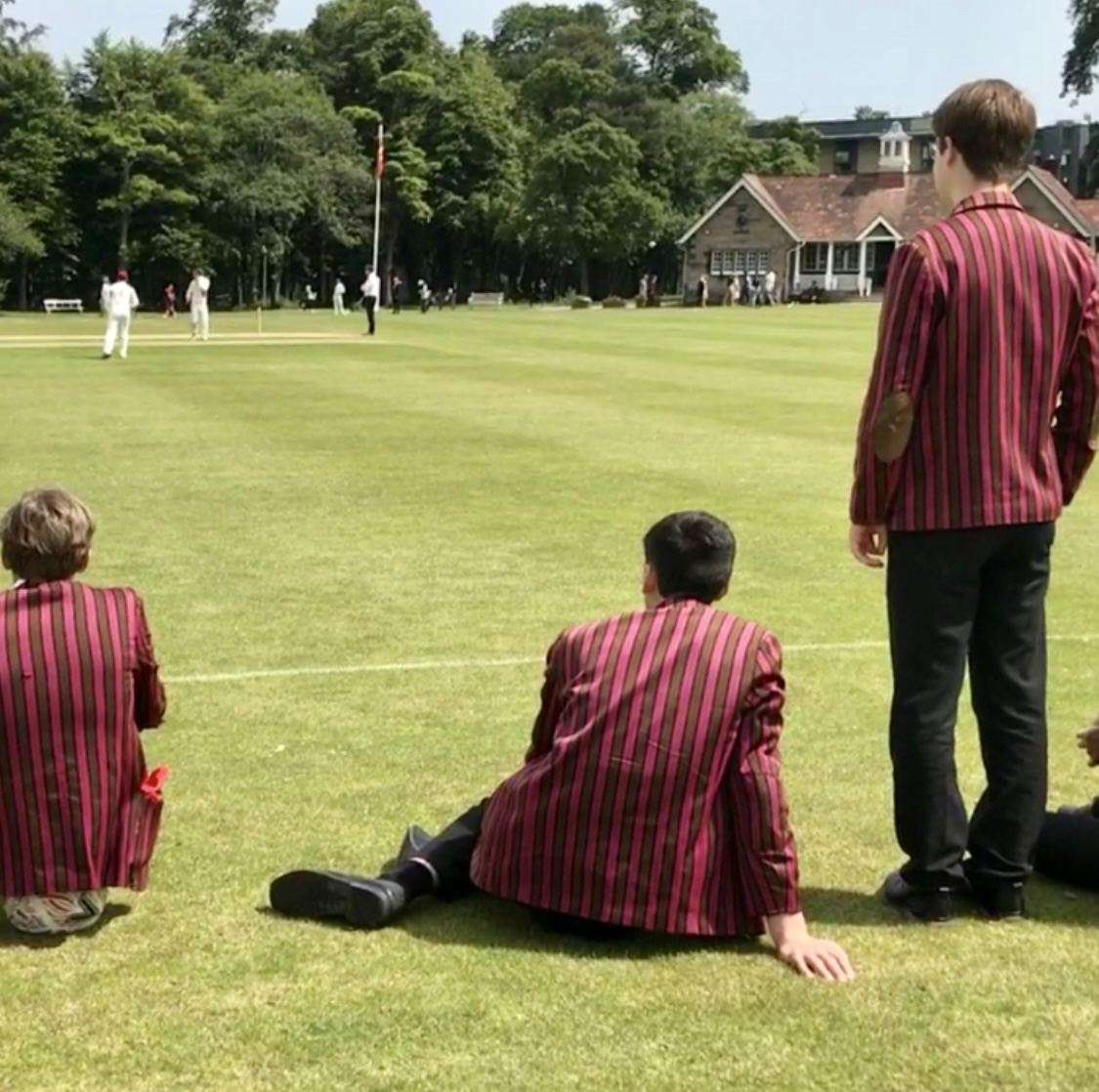
Fettes boys watch cricket wearing their chocolate and magenta blazers.

Fettes College follows the English rather than the Scottish education system. Pupils aged take English GCSEs rather than Scottish National Qualifications and students now have the choice between A Levels and the new International Baccalaureate Diploma, but cannot take Scottish exams.

Fettes is an IB World School, one of only three schools in Scotland to have this status, the other two being George Watson's College (also in Edinburgh) and St Leonards School in St Andrews.

=== Boarding houses ===
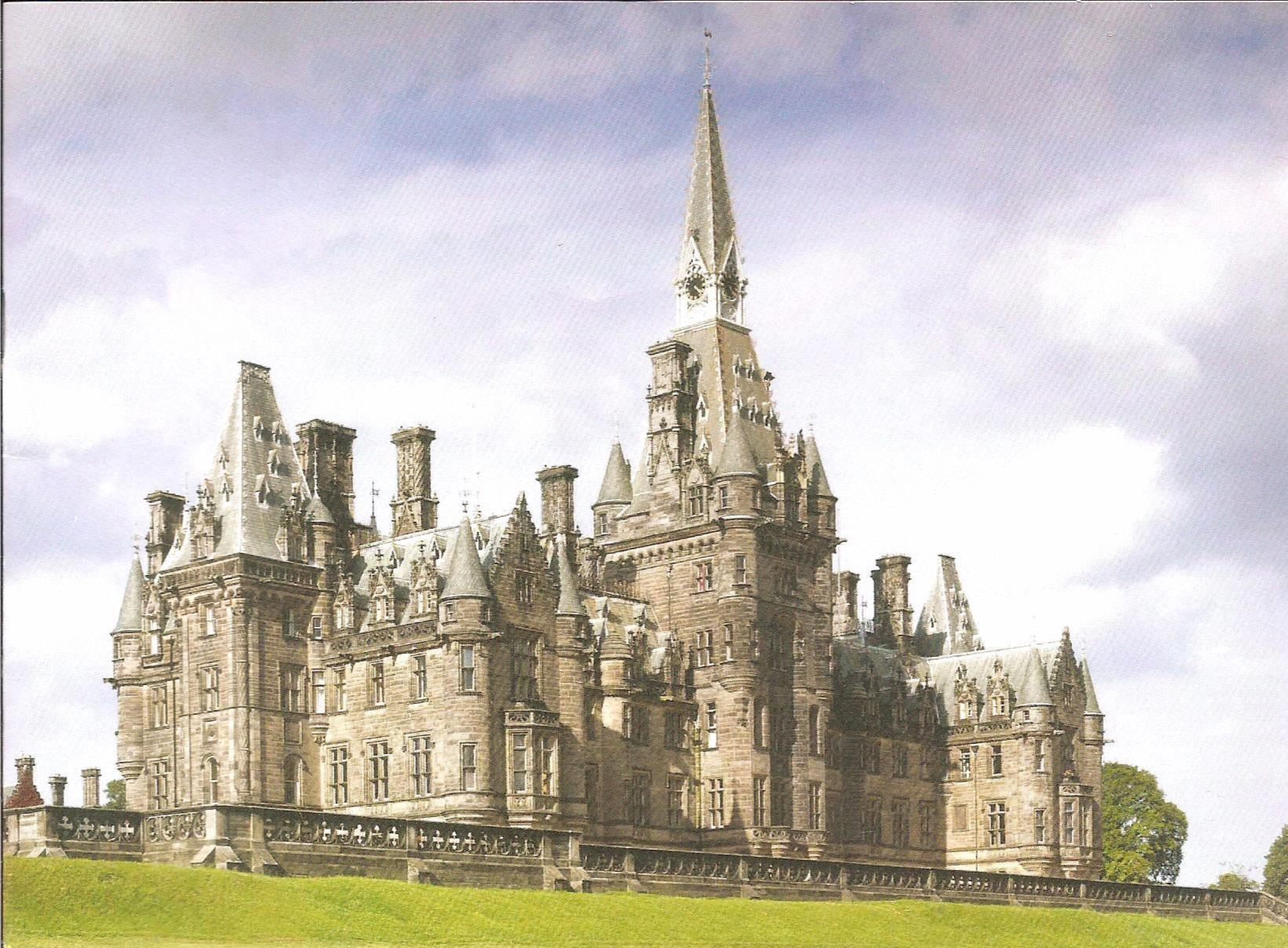
Fettes College Main Building

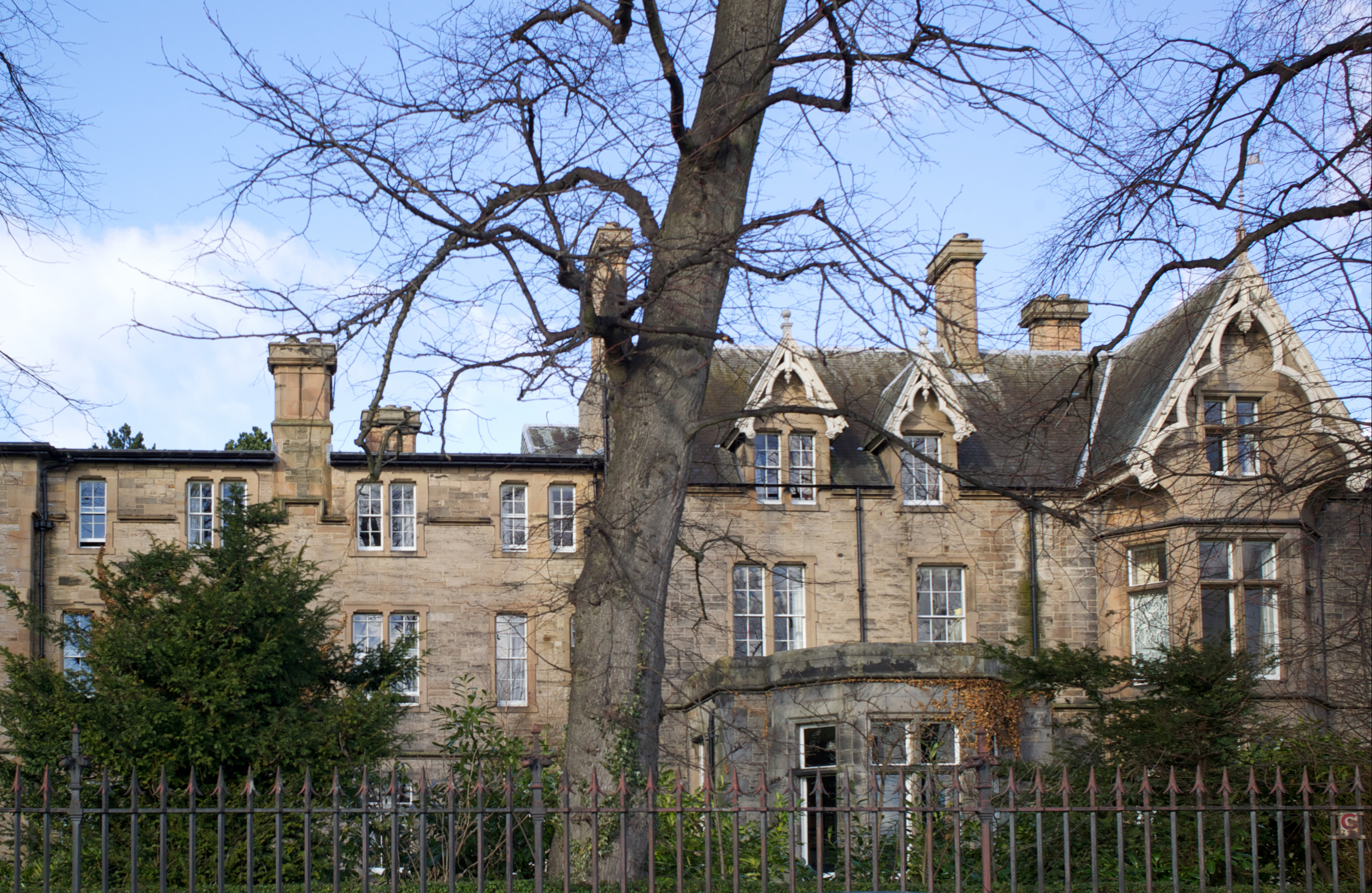
Carrington House

There are currently nine houses: four for boys, four for girls and one for boys and girls. The houses are named after the estates of the first Trustees. The male houses are large period buildings which stretch from East Fettes Avenue to Crewe Road South along Carrington Road; two of the female houses are in the upper floors of the main College Building, the third is in a modern building in the eastern part of the grounds, and the new fourth girls' house is in the western part of the grounds and was finished in September 2012. The new house was built to reduce the pressure on the three girls' houses, which were accommodating more pupils than the four boys' houses. The Upper Sixth Boarding House, Craigleith, for both boys and girls in their Upper Sixth year at Fettes, opened in September 2007.

==== Boys ====
- Carrington (1872–present)
- Glencorse (1873–present)
- Kimmerghame (1920–present)
- Moredun (1870–present)

==== Girls ====
- Arniston (1982–present)
- College East (1984–present)
- College West (1984–present)
- Dalmeny (2012–present)

==== Boys and girls ====
- Craigleith (2007–present)

==== History ====
- Dalmeny was renamed Carrington in 1873.
- Inverleith was the previous name for the Preparatory School, now a separate entity.
- Dalmeny was the name of the day girls' boarding house on the ground floor of the west wing in the 1980s.
- Kimmerghame was the name of the junior boarding house between 1884 and 1895.
- Craigleith is a mixed Upper-Sixth Form boarding house established in 2007.

=== Architecture ===
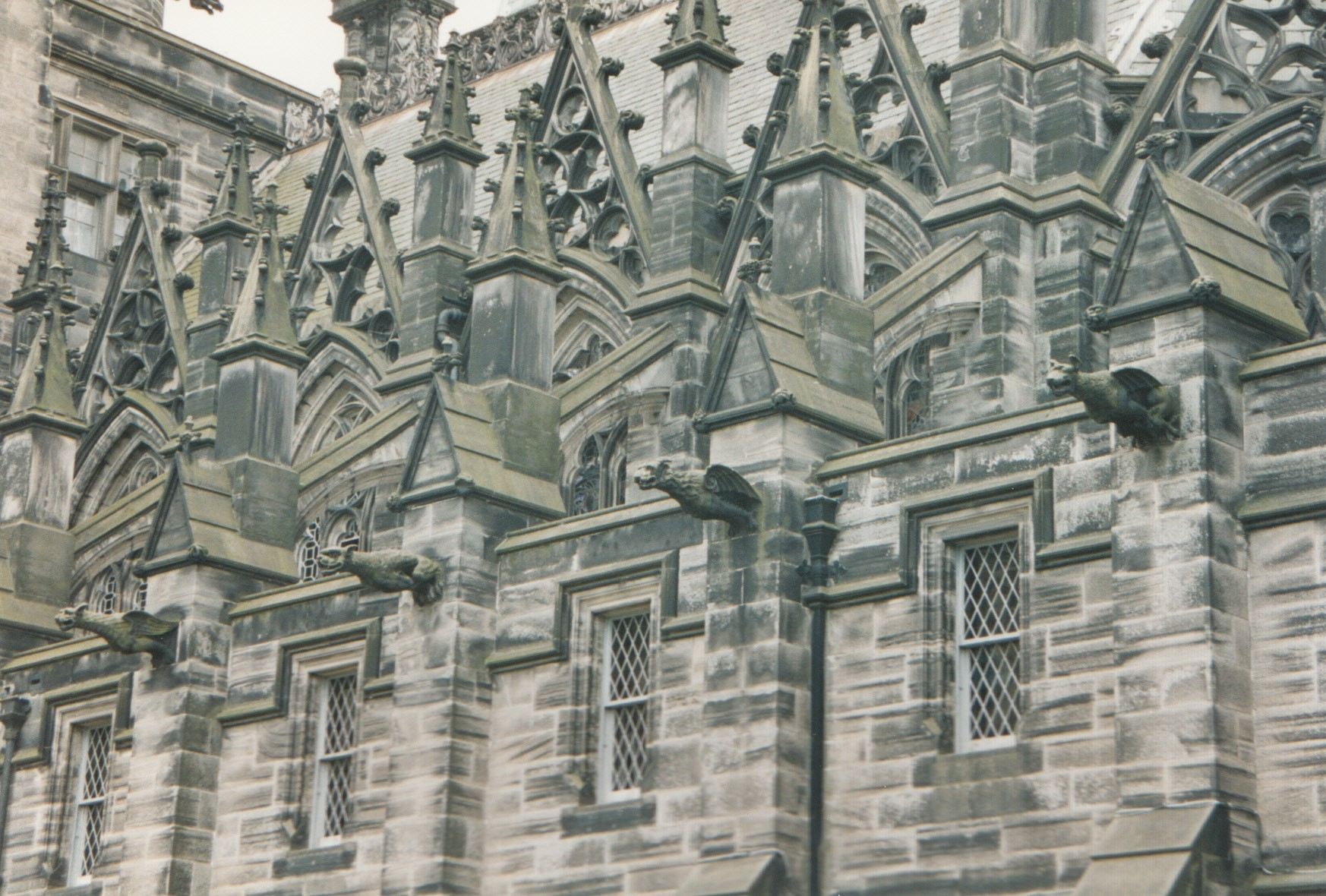
College Chapel architecture by David Bryce

The college's main building, by David Bryce (built 1863–1869), blends the design of a château of Loire with elements of the 19th-century Scottish Baronial. According to the school's website, the combination of styles and the site of the building led a modern architectural expert to praise it as "undeniably one of Scotland's greatest buildings".

The war memorial, a bronze figure of a fallen officer telling his men to "carry on" is by Birnie Rhind, 1919.

=== Coat of arms ===
The school crest is a bee because it appears at the top of Sir William's coat of arms and his seal (for letters, etc.) was also a bee. When the college's arms were granted, they were Sir William's with the colours reversed. Nowadays a more modern image is used but it is still the same coat of arms. The bee is the origin of the school's motto Industria. Its motif features prominently around the school. Beehives appear over the now-unused East and West doors of the College. A bee in stone watches over the front of Malcolm House (1880) and the Prep School. A large bee fronts Kimmerghame (1928) and there is an original lead bee in the porch of the Headmaster's Lodge.

=== Fettes tartan ===
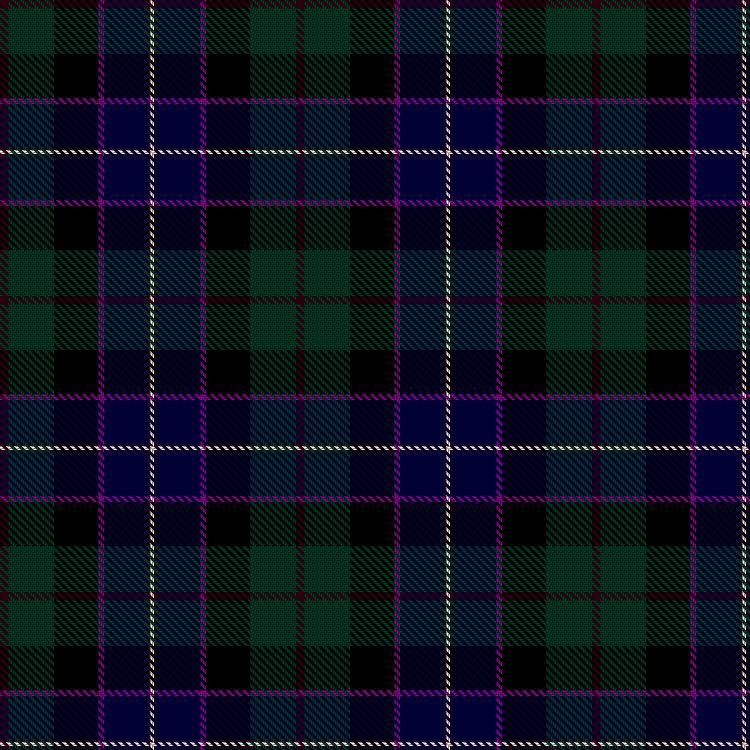
Fettes tartan

A school tartan was designed in 1996 at the prompting of the Headmaster, Malcolm Thyne. It is a balance between the traditional kilt colours of green, blue and black and the Fettes colours of chocolate and magenta, with white stripes to add brightness. The Fettes tartan is worn as a kilt by boys and as a kilt skirt by girls who do not have a family tartan. The first showing of the kilt was on the hockey/lacrosse tour of Australia and Japan in 1998.

== Fettes in fiction ==
=== Body Politic ===
In his first crime novel, Body Politic, published in 1997, featuring detective Quintilian Dalrymple and set in Edinburgh in 2020, Paul Johnston features Fettes College as a ruin, "blown to pieces in 2009" after it became a base for drug traders.

=== James Bond ===
While expanding on James Bond's back story, Ian Fleming wrote in You Only Live Twice that the agent had attended Fettes College, his father Andrew Bond's old school, after having been removed from Eton. Fleming biographer John Pearson claims an Andrew Bond attended Fettes as a boarder in Carrington House.

"Here the atmosphere was somewhat Calvinistic, and both academic and athletic standards were rigorous. Nevertheless, though inclined to be solitary by nature, he established some firm friendships among the traditionally famous athletic circles, at the school. By the time he left, at the early age of seventeen, he had twice fought for the school as a light-weight and had, in addition, founded the first serious judo class at a British public school."

Fleming based his character on Sir Alexander Glen, an old boy of the school who was Winston Churchill's envoy to Belgrade during the Second World War.

While Fleming never claimed there was any source for the name of Bond other than James Bond, an American ornithologist, Philp claims a real-life Commander James Bond RNVR attended Fettes. This is purely coincidental and certainly not an influence as Fleming's Bond was created in 1952, whereas the Fettes student namesake attended the school after 1954; there are no Bonds recorded at the school prior to that date. The school had his Who's Who entry copied and framed over the Second Master's office door in one of its main corridors. This has since been removed.

Several young James Bond stories refer to, or feature, Bond's schooling at Fettes. The cover of This Time We Are All In The Front Line depicts a young Bond and Housemates leaving Fettes in uniform to rescue survivors of Luftwaffe bombing of Leith Docks in the Second World War.

=== Captain Britain ===
^{Captain America} "Uh, it's Captain Britain, right? Tony was telling me all about that submarine rescue you guys did a few weeks back. That was pretty amazing."

^{Captain Britain} "Oh, Tony's hilarious, isn't he? Everyone here just absolutely loved him. We've all been very excited about meeting you too, Captain. Did you know I used to have a poster of you on my wall when I was a pupil up at Fettes College in Edinburgh?"

— The first meeting of Captains America and Britain

Later to become Marvel Comics' Captain Britain, the British equivalent of Captain America, Brian Braddock was born to aristocratic parents in the town of Maldon, Essex. After falling upon hard times, Brian's family had lost their place in society, leaving Brian a lonely yet gifted child who immerses himself in the study of Physics. A prodigious talent, Brian is selected to attend Fettes College where he excels in his studies. Following the death of his parents (Sir James and Lady Elizabeth) in what seemed to be a laboratory accident, Brian accepts a fellowship at Darkmoor nuclear research centre. When the facility is attacked by the Reaver, Brian tries to find help by escaping on his motorcycle. Although he crashes his bike in a nearly fatal accident, Merlyn and his daughter the Omniversal Guardian Roma appear to the badly injured Brian. They give him the chance to be the superhero Captain Britain. He is offered a choice: the Amulet of Right or the Sword of Might. Considering himself to be no warrior and unsuited for the challenge, he rejects the Sword and chooses the Amulet. This choice transforms Brian Braddock into Captain Britain, the champion of the British Isles.

=== Sloane Ranger ===
This iconic 1982 guide to the British upper classes, also known as "Sloane Rangers", described Fettes College as a "First XI" public school.

== Heads of the college ==
The following have been heads of the college since it was founded:

- 1870–1889 Alexander Potts
- 1890–1919 William Heard
- 1919–1945 Alec Ashcroft
- 1945–1958 Donald Crichton-Miller
- 1958–1971 Ian McIntosh
- 1971–1979 Anthony Chenevix-Trench
- 1979–1988 Cameron Cochrane
- 1988–1998 Malcolm Thyne
- 1998–2017 Michael Spens
- 2017–2019 Geoffrey Stanford
- 2019–2026 Helen Harrison
- 2026–present Richard Girvan

== Other notable staff ==
- Eric Anderson (1936–2020), provost of Eton College
- Steve Bates (born 1963), played for the England national rugby union team
- John Hay Beith, novelist, playwright and essayist
- Charlotte Cheverton, founder of the Leith School of Art
- Henry Watson Fowler, lexicographer and commentator on the usage of the English language
- Thomas Fielden, Professor of Pianoforte at the Royal College of Music for over 30 years
- Robert Bowes Malcolm, staff physician
- Ian Robertson, retired BBC commentator and former Scottish Rugby Union international
- Iain Wares, a teacher who sexually abused boys at Fettes College and Edinburgh Academy with impunity over many years
- Morris Meredith Williams, designer of the frieze of the Scottish National War Memorial

== Notable Old Fettesians ==
Fettes College has produced many judges, lawyers, diplomats, military officers, politicians and persons from academia. In sport, its most notable alumni are on the rugby pitch. Four Old Fettesians have won the Victoria Cross and one the George Cross. Fettes also boasts a 2015 Nobel Prize winner in the economist Sir Angus Deaton, as well as former British Prime Minister Tony Blair.

== See also ==
- Fettesian-Lorettonian Club

== Sources ==
- Philp, Robert, A Keen Wind Blows, James & James, 1998 ISBN 0-907383-85-8
- BBC, My Teacher the Abuser: Fighting for Justice. BBC One - Panorama, My Teacher the Abuser: Fighting for Justice
