= Lorimer (surname) =

Lorimer is a surname of Scottish origin which means "a bridle maker." It may also refer to a "maker and seller of spurs, bits, and other metal attachments to harness and tackle, from Anglo-Norman French lorenier, loremier, an agent derivative of Old French lorain meaning ‘tackle’ or ‘harness’, etc."

Notable people with the surname include:

- Bob Lorimer (born 1953), retired Canadian ice hockey defenceman
- David Lockhart Robertson Lorimer (1876–1962), officer in the British Indian Army and noted linguist
- Emily Lorimer (1881-1949) Anglo-Irish journalist, linguist, political analyst, and writer
- George Lorimer (disambiguation)
- Glennis Lorimer (1913–1968), British actress
- Henry Lorimer (1879–1933), British Conservative Party politician
- Hew Lorimer (1907–1993), Scottish sculptor
- Hilda Lorimer (1873–1954), Scottish classical scholar
- Hugh Lorimer (1896–1939), Scottish footballer
- Ian Lorimer, British television director
- James Lorimer (1926–2022), American attorney and FBI agent
- James Lorimer (Australian politician) (1831–1889), Australian politician and businessman
- James Lorimer (South African politician) (born 1962)
- John Gordon Lorimer (civil servant) (1870–1914), Scottish colonial administrator and historian
- John Henry Lorimer (1856–1936), Scottish painter who worked on portraits and genre scenes of everyday life
- John Lorimer (surgeon) (1732–1795), Anglo-American surgeon, mathematician, politician and cartographer
- Linda Lorimer, American university administrator
- Maxwell George Lorimer, known as Max Wall (1908–1990), English comedian and actor
- Norma Lorimer (1864–1948), Scots novelist and travel writer
- Peter Lorimer (1946–2021), footballer of the 1960s, '70s and '80s for Leeds United
- Robert Lorimer (1864–1929), Scottish architect
- Roddy Lorimer (born 1953), Scottish musician who has performed with Blur, Gene, The Rolling Stones, Suede, The Waterboys and Kick Horns
- William Lorimer (politician) (1861–1934), United States Senator and congressman from the State of Illinois
- William Lorimer (scholar) (1885–1967), scholar best known for his translation of the New Testament into Lowland Scots
