= Scrimgeour =

People called Scrimgeour

- Alexander Scrimgeour (1897–1916), Author of "Scrimgeour's Scribbling Diary" who was killed at the Battle of Jutland
- Colin Scrimgeour, 20th-century New Zealand Methodist minister and broadcaster.
- Henry Scrimgeour, 16th-century Scottish librarian and religious controversialist.
- John Scrimgeour of Myres, 16th-century Scottish architect, Master of Work to the Crown of Scotland
- John Scrimgeour (Canadian politician), 19th-century Prince Edward Island politician
- Robert Shedden Scrimgeour (1788–1863), Scottish aristocrat and stockbroker

People called Scrimgour

- Derek Scrimgour (born 1978), Scottish footballer (St. Mirren FC)

See also

- Scrymgeour
- Clan Scrymgeour

People in fiction called Scrimgeour

- Rufus Scrimgeour, a character in novels by J. K. Rowling.
