= Whitesmith =

Metalworker

A whitesmith is a metalworker who does finishing work on iron and steel such as filing, lathing, burnishing or polishing. The term also refers to a person who works with "white" or light-coloured metals, and is sometimes used as a synonym for tinsmith. Whitesmithing developed as a speciality of blacksmithing in the 1700s, when extra time was given to filing and polishing certain products.

== History ==
The first known description of Whitesmith is from 1686:

The Iron thus prepared, is used both by the White and Black-Smiths of this County, according as the condition of their wares require; it being forged by the former, into Sithes, Reaping-hooks, Axes, Hatchets, Bills, &c…which being ground at the blade-mills to a bright edge they have given this sort of Artisans that make them, the name of White-Smiths.

In 1836 the trade was described by Isaac Taylor:

The business of the Smith comprises two branches, that of the blacksmith and that of the whitesmith. From the hands of the former come large and coarse articles, as horse-shoes, ploughshares, chains, iron doors for safes, &c. The whitesmith manufactures articles of neater and more delicate form, as locks, keys, carpenters' tools, &c. The blacksmith does little with his iron, till he has softened it in the fire of his forge, which is a kind of hearth, raised to a convenient height from the ground. A large pair of double bellows pours a strong stream of air to the centre of the forge, where he has a fire made of small coals, or coal dust, wetted, to make them give a more intense heat. Into this fire he thrusts his iron, and, working his bellows, brings it to a white heat, in which state it is so soft that a little hammering will reduce it to any required shape. The whitesmith also has a forge; but he depends less upon it than upon his files. The articles he manufactures are so numerous, that almost every one constitutes a distinct employment: one set of men being confined to the making of locks and keys, another set to the making of files, a third to carpenters' tools, and so on.

== Process ==
The principal manual skills of the whitesmith were in filing and turning (the use of lathes). Using cross-cut files the whitesmith could achieve a flat, smooth finish on iron or steel products where the less skilled might only achieve a convex effect. For very large items, the whitesmith might even file when red hot using a two-person operated float file.

This profession is also related to a bell hanger and locksmith as they perform much file work. In Great Britain this type of worker was affiliated with a union. The Amalgamated Society of Whitesmiths was founded in 1889. It was renamed the Amalgamated Society of Whitesmiths, Locksmiths, Bell-hangers, Domestic Engineers, Art Metal Workers and General Iron Fitters in 1891, the Amalgamated Society of Whitesmiths, Locksmiths, Bell-hangers, Domestic Engineers, Art Metal Workers and General Iron and Pipe Fitters in 1894, and the Amalgamated Society of Whitesmiths, Domestic Engineers and General Pipe Fitters in 1904. In 1908 it merged with the Amalgamated Society of Kitchen Range, Stove Grate, Gas Stove, Hot Water, Art Metal and other Smiths and Fitters connected with the above Trades, the Amalgamated Society of Kitchen Range, Hot Water and General Fitters and the Birmingham Society of Hot Water and Steam Engineers to form the National Union of Operative Heating and Domestic Engineers, Whitesmiths and General Iron Workers.

== Products ==
James Watt employed a whitesmith in the 1760s when working on his experimental steam engine. The first cylinder was made by this whitesmith using hammered iron and solder. Although this technique proved insufficient, when this whitesmith died soon after Watt wrote to John Roebuck greatly lamenting the loss of his "white iron man".

With the industrial revolution, in the same way that many blacksmiths became specialised as farriers making horse shoes, so many whitesmiths became lorimers making spurs, stirrups, bridle bits and buckles.

Typically whitesmiths made products that either required a decorative finish such as fire grates, or that needed cold-working such as screws and lathed machine parts.
