= Hilda Roberts =

Irish painter (1901–1982)

Hilda Roberts Marsh HRHA
- Born: Hilda Roberts; 12 March 1901; Dublin, Ireland
- Died: 18 June 1982 (aged 81); Dublin, Ireland
- Known for: Portraits

Hilda Roberts HRHA (12 March 1901 – 18 June 1982) was an Irish portrait artist.

== Life ==
Roberts was born in Ranelagh in Dublin 12 March 1901 to builder Samuel Roberts and Elizabeth Jackson. The family were Quakers and at one time had lived in New Zealand. Two of her brothers were born in New Zealand.

She was educated gaining her first qualification in 1924 from the Metropolitan School of Art in Dublin where she was taught by Patrick Tuohy. Roberts went on to the London Polytechnic in 1925 and the Grande Chaumiere Studio, Paris in 1926. Roberts got her first commission at the age of seventeen, when she illustrated Emily Lorimer and David Lockhart Robertson Lorimer's translation of Persian Tales. While in college Roberts also studied Sculpture but became better known for her portrait work.

== Work ==
She married Arnold Marsh on 29 December 1932 in Dublin. He was the headmaster of Newtown School, Waterford until 1939. They were involved in the Waterford Art Exhibitions and the creation of a permanent exhibition in the city. Their daughter is Eithne Clark. Her work was also part of the painting event in the art competition at the 1932 Summer Olympics.

She exhibited at RHA and in the Irish Exhibition of Living Art in both 1958 and 1943. She has been involved in the Irish Women Artists of the Twentieth Century at Jennings Gallery, UCC in September 2014. Probably her most famous painting is a portrait of George Russell 'AE'.

Roberts and her husband created a group of artists in apartments in their property in Dublin. In 1956 Gerda Frömel with her husband and child were offered an apartment at Woodtown.

=== Awards ===
- 1924 & 1925 RDS Taylor Art Award
- 1925 Californian Gold Medal for Sculpture
- 1932 Aonach Tailteann Exhibition Prize
