= Pierre Goloubinoff =

Swiss-Israeli biochemist

Pierre A. Goloubinoff (Hebrew: פייר גולובינוף; born April 4, 1957) is a Swiss-Israeli biochemist, author and activist for Yemeni immigration and the preservation of Yemeni heritage. He is also known by the pen names David Hamami or Daoud Hamami.

== Biography ==
Pierre Goloubinoff was born in France as the third child of four of the French writers Serge Golon and Anne Golon, who in private life were called Vsevolod Goloubinoff and Simone Changeux. His father belonged to a noble Russian family exiled in France in 1920 after the 1917 revolution; he died in 1972. When Pierre Goloubinoff was two years old, his family emigrated to the city of Montana, in the canton of Valais in the Swiss Alps. In the 1960s, following the publication of stories about the Holocaust, the family decided to join the Zionist enterprise. Following their relocation to Israel, part of the Goloubinoff family converted to Judaism.

== Scientific career ==
In 1972, Christian B. Anfinsen was awarded the Nobel Prize for seminal experiments performed mostly by his postdoctoral fellow, Michael Sela. They showed with artificially unfolded proteins that the primary amino acid sequence suffices to dictate the proper spontaneous refolding of proteins into their functional three-dimensional native structures. Yet, they also observed that proteins can often misfold and precipitate into large insoluble aggregates. They suggested that in cells, unknown factors could possibly assist protein folding.

In 1988, Goloubinoff helped follow up Anfinsen’s finding: a class of highly conserved proteins, many of which belonging to the heat shock proteins and were dubbed “molecular chaperones” by R. John Ellis, could mediate the assembly of protein complexes such as phages and RubisCO, preventing the formation of non-functional, protein aggregates.

As a postdoctoral fellow in the laboratory of George Huntly Lorimer, Goloubinoff provided the first experimental demonstration of a mechanism by which a bacterial chaperone, GroEL, could act on the folding and assembly pathway of a recombinant RubisCO protein. They showed that in bacteria, the chaperone could prevent the aggregation of a recombinant protein, RubisCO, and promote its proper folding and assembly o r. They further showed that in the test tube the purified chaperone could also drive the proper folding of the recombinant protein.

Since 1991, as a principal investigator first at the Hebrew University of Jerusalem and from 2001 at the University of Lausanne, Goloubinoff contributed to further discoveries on the mechanisms of various molecular chaperones that prevent protein aggregation, promote protein folding, actively solubilize stable aggregates and can catalytically unfold stress-misfolded proteins.

== Social activism ==
During his studies at the Weizmann Institute, Goloubinoff became interested in the fate of Jews who remained in Yemen after immigration in the 1950s (a small community remained separated from their relatives). He went there in September 1985, using his Swiss passport, and brought valuable information about them to the organizations working for them. From 1988 to 1992, in collaboration with Haim Tawil from Yeshiva University, William Wolf worked with the US government to pressure the Yemeni government to allow Jews to leave. They called their operation "Operation Esther" and presented it as a humanitarian issue unrelated to Zionism. During his visits to Yemen, Pierre Goloubinoff used the names David Hamami (with the Jews) and Daoud Hamami (with the Muslims), after realizing that Arabic speakers had difficulty pronouncing his name. When he began publishing novels in French, he adopted the name Daoud Hamami as his pen name. The theme of Yemen is dominant in his books.

== Published works ==
Goloubinoff has written dozens of articles, theses and book chapters in biochemistry. He has also participated in the writing of publications on Yemeni heritage and in the writing of narrative texts on the subject. In the field of Yemeni heritage, he has often signed his books under the pen name Daoud Hamami.

- Goloubinoff, P. (1996). The Valley of Beyhan; The Beginning of the Incense Road. in: The Jewish Community of Beyhan; Tales and Heritage (ed. Shalom Lahav) The Association For Society and Culture, Documenting and Research, Natanya, Israel, pp. 29–34 (in Hebrew).
- Hamami, D. Les exilés du Yémen Heureux, Editions de l'Harmattan, Paris (1994). 295 pages.
- Hamami, D. Banei-el-yaman, Editions Le Publieur, Paris (2004). 467 pages.
- Hamami, D. "Rencontre en Arabie Heureuse, Editions Le Publieur, Paris (2008). 420 pages.
