= Nicholas Koester Building =

- U.S. National Register of Historic Places
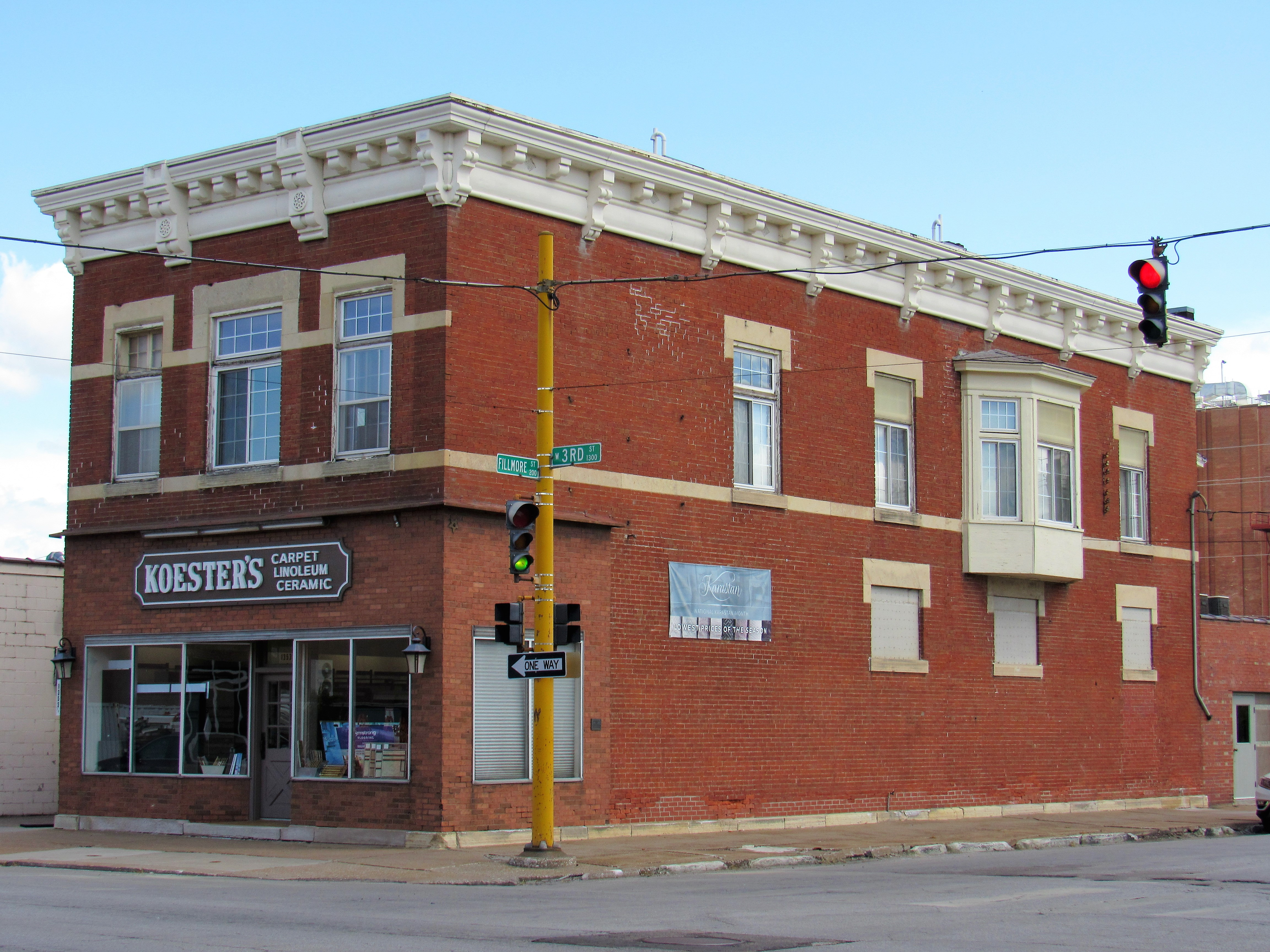

- Location within Iowa Location within the United States
- Location: 1353 W. 3rd Street; Davenport, Iowa
- Coordinates: 41°31′19″N 90°35′38″W
- Area: less than one acre
- Built: 1890
- Architectural style: Italianate
- MPS: Davenport MRA
- NRHP reference No.: 83002461
- Added to NRHP: July 7, 1983

The Nicholas Koester Building is a historic building located in the West End of Davenport, Iowa, United States. It has been listed on the National Register of Historic Places since 1983. The building is a two-story brick structure that sits on the southeast corner of West Third and Fillmore Streets. It is part of a small commercial district near the historic German neighborhoods and the industrial areas along the Mississippi River. It is a typical commercial building in the West End which combines commercial space on the first floor and apartments on the second floor.

Previous to opening his shop, Nicholas Koester lived down the street and worked as a tinsmith. In his store he sold stoves and tin ware. Koester also lived in the residential space above. The business on the first floor continues to carry the Koester name.

The building was completed in 1890 and was designed in the Italianate style. It features a decorative cornice and rectangular windows on the second floor. There is an oriel window on the Fillmore Street side of the building.
