= William Lorimer =

William Lorimer may refer to:

- William Lorimer (politician) (1861–1934), American politician and member of Congress
- William Lorimer (scholar) (1885-1967), Scottish scholar, famous for translating the New Testament into the Scots language
