= George Lorimer =

George Lorimer may refer to:

- George Lorimer (rugby) (1872–1897), English rugby league footballer
- George Horace Lorimer (1867–1937), American journalist and author
- George Huntly Lorimer (born 1942), professor of chemistry at the University of Maryland
- George C. Lorimer (1838–1904), American pastor
