= Strathmartine Hospital =

- NHS Tayside
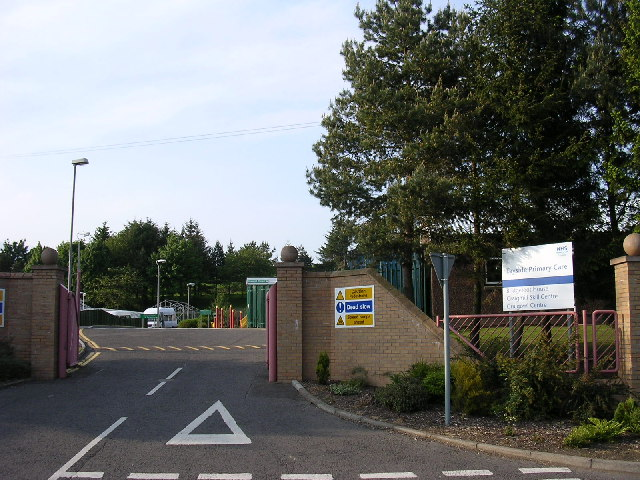
- Entrance to Strathmartine Hospital

- Shown in Angus

Geography
- Location: Craigmaill Road, Strathmartine, Scotland
- Coordinates: 56.5046°N 3.0009°W

Organisation
- Care system: NHS Scotland
- Type: Specialist

Services
- Speciality: Geriatric hospital

History
- Founded: 1855
- Closed: 2003

Links
- Lists: Hospitals in Scotland

Strathmartine Hospital was a health facility in Craigmaill Road, Strathmartine, Angus, Scotland. It was managed by NHS Tayside. It remains a Category B listed building.

== History ==
The facility had its origins in a home for "imbecile children" established by Sir John and Lady Jane Ogilvy; it was designed by Coe & Goodwin and opened as the Baldovan Institute in around 1855. The present structure was designed by John Turnbull Maclaren and completed in the early 20th century. After joining the National Health Service in 1948, it was renamed Strathmartine Hospital in 1959. During the redevelopment of the site in the mid-1960s the original structure 19th century structure was demolished. It was progressively decommissioned from the late 1980s, closing completely in 2003. In 2014 Heritage Lottery Funding was awarded to a project for people to record their memories of the hospital. The decaying building was subsequently placed on the Buildings at Risk Register.

The archives of the hospital are held by Archive Services at the University of Dundee.
