= Nancy Conn =

Scottish scientist (1919–2013)

Nancy K. Conn
- Born: Agnes Kirkland Conn; 27 June 1919; Barrhead, Scotland
- Died: 20 March 2013 (aged 93); Bearsden, Scotland
- Education: High School of Dundee; University of St Andrews
- Occupation: Bacteriologist
- Known for: Ending the 1970 Edinburgh typhoid outbreak
- Scientific career
- Fields: Bacteriology
- Workplaces: Western General Hospital, Edinburgh, Greater Glasgow Health Board

Nancy K. Conn (1919–2013) was a Scottish bacteriologist known primarily for her work on preventing the spread of typhoid in Edinburgh in the summer of 1970.

== Life ==
Agnes "Nancy" Kirkland Conn was born on 27 June 1919 in Barrhead, Scotland to James Charles Conn and Margaret Aitken. Her father was a Church of Scotland minister, who in 1926 was transferred to Broughty Ferry, and so Nancy attended the High School of Dundee. She earned an MA in Modern History and English in 1940 from the University of St Andrews, and in 1945 graduated M.B., Ch.B from the Bute Medical School there. She played hockey for Scotland as an adolescent, named in team photographs as A.K. Conn.

She worked at the Central Microbiological Laboratories at Edinburgh's Western General Hospital until December 1972, when she became a consultant and the Deputy Director of the Western Regional Hospital Board in Glasgow. She retired in 1979. She was a Soroptimist and a member of the National Trust for Scotland. She died aged 93 on 20 March 2013. An imagined exhibition demonstrating her work can be found at the Glasgow Science Centre.

== 1970 typhoid outbreak ==
In the summer of 1970, several patients were admitted to the Infectious Diseases Hospital at Western General with typhoid fever. After interviewing the patients, and their friends and families, in detail, Conn discovered they had all spent time by the Water of Leith and had drunk the river water. Using Dr. White's brand sanitary towels as water sampling devices, Conn narrowed down the source to a surface water drain in Colinton. Conn, with help from the City of Edinburgh Health Department, took samples from the sewer and surface water drain system. They discovered an improper connection which meant raw sewage was passing straight into the river. After identifying the housing tenement with the connection problem, Conn found that the source of the typhoid bacteria was a 76 year old woman who was completely asymptomatic. The woman had lived in the house for 13 years and had never once been abroad.

Since the phage type of the Salmonella typhi bacterium was a rare, Asiatic form, Conn was able to link the asymptomatic carrier to several other local typhoid cases dating back to 1963. If not for Conn's detective work and the faulty sewer connection, the source patient would never have known she was carrying the bacterium. All of Conn's work took place over two months and no further typhoid cases were admitted to the hospital after the source was discovered.

Conn's systematic investigation stopped a typhoid outbreak in Edinburgh, as locals ceased drinking from the Water of Leith and the river was cleaned. Subsequent actions were taken to further clean the rivers in Leith, such as the "Operation Riverbank" in 1983.

== Publications ==
- N.K. Conn et al. (1959) Systemic candidiasis and endocarditis due to C. tropicalis. British Medical Journal, 1:944-947. doi:10.1136/bmj.1.5127.944
- N.K. Conn (1969) Coliform bacteraemia in infants. Scottish Medical Journal, 14: 23-28 doi:10.1177/003693306901400104
- N.K. Conn (1970) A study of some of the methods of urinary collection in children. Journal of Clinical Pathology, 23: 81-84 doi:10.1136/jcp.23.1.81
- N.K. Conn and R.J. Farrand (1970) Shellfish Toxicity in Scotland, 1969. Scottish Medical Journal, 15: 169-171 doi:10.1177/003693307001500502
- N.K. Conn et al. (1972) Water-borne typhoid fever caused by an unusual Vi-phage type in Edinburgh. Journal of Hygiene, 70: 245-253 doi:10.1017/s0022172400022300
