= Francis Nicoll =

Church of Scotland minister

Francis Nicoll (1771–1835) was a senior Church of Scotland who served both as Principal of St Andrews University and Moderator of the General Assembly of the Church of Scotland in 1809, the highest position in the Church of Scotland

== Life ==
He was born in Lossiemouth in 1771 the third son of John Nicoll, a merchant. He was educated at King's College, Aberdeen graduating MA in 1789.

He was licensed to preach as a Church of Scotland minister by the Presbytery of Elgin in 1793, but, failing to find a patron (as was then required) he acted as a tutor to the family of Sir James Grant of Grant. In September 1797 he was ordained as minister of Auchtertool, translating to the parish of Mains and Strathmartine in September 1799.

He was awarded a Doctor of Divinity (DD) in 1807.

In 1809 he succeeded Rev Dr Andrew Grant as Moderator of the General Assembly of the Church of Scotland.

In 1819 he was appointed Principal of St Andrews University in place of Rev Prof James Playfair, resigning in September 1824. He died on 8 October 1835.

== Artistic recognition ==
He was portrayed by Robert Moore Hodgetts.

== Family ==
In October 1814 he married Anne Ramsay of Edinburgh (d.1842). They had two daughters and a son.
