= James Stewart (minister, born 1896) =

British clergyman (1896–1990)

James Stuart Stewart (21 July 1896 – 1 July 1990) was a minister of the Church of Scotland. He taught New Testament Language, Literature and Theology at the University of Edinburgh (New College).

Educated at the High School of Dundee and the University of St Andrews from 1913, he took a first in classics (MA 1917). His studies were interrupted by service in France with the Royal Engineers (1916–1918). After the war, he pursued divinity at New College, Edinburgh, then a United Free Church of Scotland institution, with postgraduate work at the University of Bonn (1921–1922) and an assistantship at Barclay Church, Edinburgh. He was minister of North Morningside Parish Church. He also served as Chaplain to the Queen in Scotland from 1952–1966, later as extra chaplain, and as Moderator of the General Assembly of the Church of Scotland in 1963.

He authored many books, including Heralds of God, The Strong Name, and A Man in Christ. In 1999, Preaching Magazine ranked James S. Stewart as the best preacher of the twentieth century, commenting that his books on preaching "have inspired tens of thousands of preachers to strive for greater effectiveness in their proclamation of God's Word." Stewart wrote several books on the art and craft of preaching and co-edited with H. R. Mackintosh what is still the standard English translation of Friedrich Schleiermacher's influential work, The Christian Faith.

== Bibliography ==
- 1928: Friedrich Schleiermacher The Christian Faith (Der christliche Glaube, 1820–21, 2nd ed. 1830–1), 2nd ed. tr. H. R. MacKintosh, J. S. Stewart, editor. Edinburgh: T. & T. Clark Publishers, Ltd. 1999 paperback: ISBN 0567087093
- 1935: A Man in Christ: The Vital Elements of St. Paul's Religion. London: Hodder and Stoughton (reissued: Harper, New York, [1963?]) ISBN 1573832243
- 1941: The Strong Name. New York: C. Scribner’s Sons
- 1946: Heralds of God. London: Hodder & Stoughton ISBN 9781573832113
- A Faith to Proclaim ISBN 9781573832236
- 1996: Walking with God; edited by Gordon Grant; with an introductory memoir by W. J. G. McDonald. Edinburgh: Saint Andrew Press ISBN 9781573833806 ISBN 0715207229
- James S. Stewart by David L. Larsen, Preaching Magazine
