= Strathmartine =

Coordinates: 56.501263°N 2.997399°W

- Location within Angus Location near the Dundee City council area
- OS grid reference: NO387348
- Lieutenancy area: Angus
- Country: Scotland
- Sovereign state: United Kingdom
- Post town: DUNDEE
- Postcode district: DD4
- Dialling code: 01382
- Police: Scotland
- Fire: Scottish
- Ambulance: Scottish
- UK Parliament: Dundee East
- Scottish Parliament: Angus South

Strathmartine is an area of Angus, Scotland (named after a local mythical hero, Strathmartin The Dragonslayer). It is to the north of Dundee and the surrounding district is often referred to as "the Howe o Strathmartine".

The parishes of Mains and Strathmartine were united on 21 Nov 1792. Anciently, Mains was called Earl's Strathdichty, Strathmartine was called Strathdichty Martin. The Dichty Water flows through the parishes.

William Lorimer, the classicist, known for producing a translation of the New Testament in Lowland Scots was born in Strathmartine. Baldovan village to the north was once the home to Strathmartine Hospital which was a long stay hospital for people with severe learning disabilities.

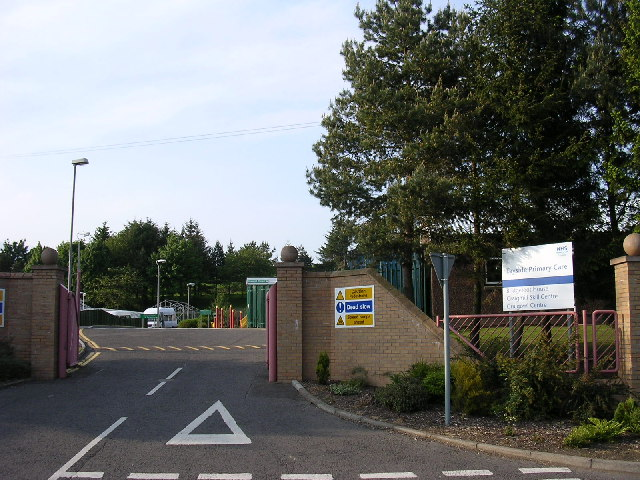
Strathmartine Hospital entrance

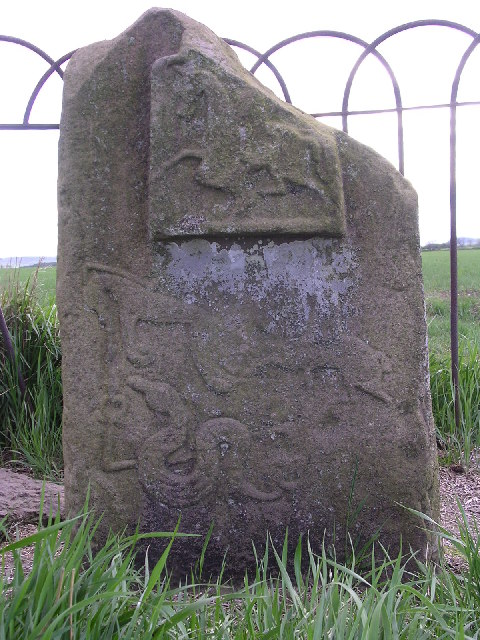
St Martin's Stone

== Notable residents ==
- Very Rev Francis Nicoll, the Moderator of the General Assembly of the Church of Scotland in 1809 and later Principal of St Andrews University was parish minister of Strathmartine from 1799 to 1819.
- William Lorimer, the classicist, known for producing a translation of the New Testament in Lowland Scots was born in Strathmartine.
