= Alexander Crawford Lamb =

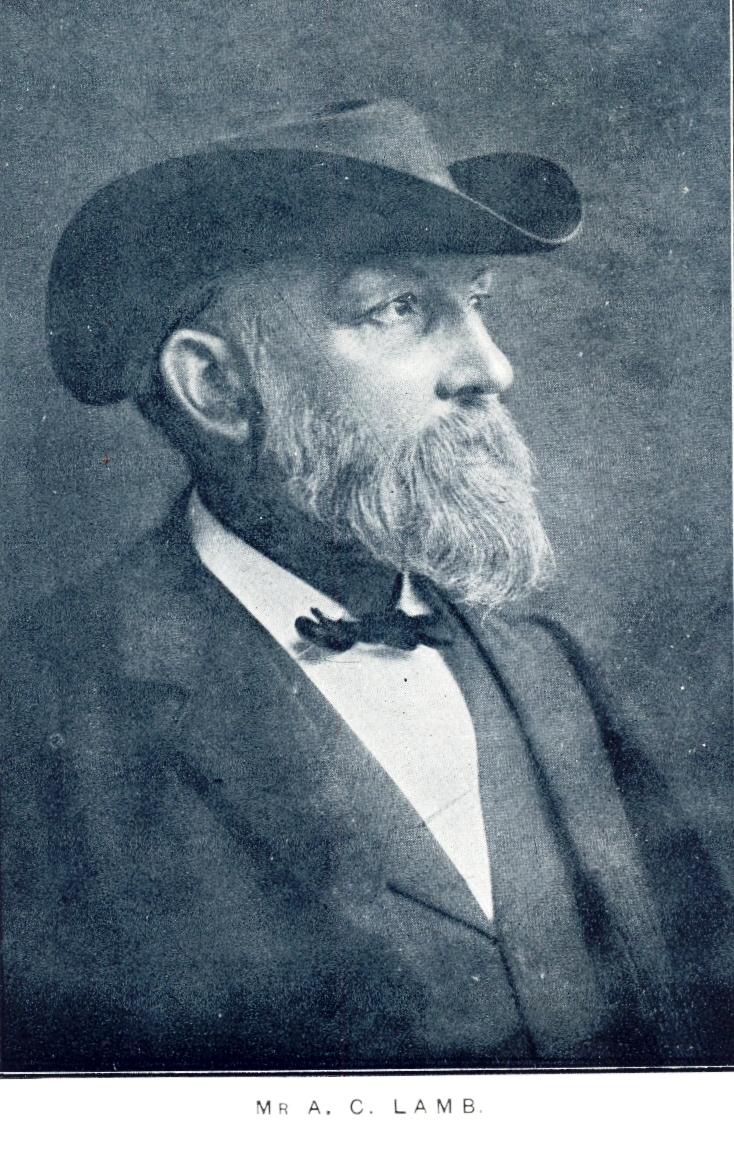
- From John Maclauchlan, A Brief Guide to the "Old Dundee" Historical Collection, facing p.16.
- Born: 21 February 1843; Dundee, Scotland, UK
- Died: 29 April 1897 (aged 54); London, UK
- Occupations: Writer, Art collector, Antiquarian, Hotelier
- Spouse: Mary Ann Worrall
- Children: two sons and four daughters
- Writing career
- Pen name: A.C. Lamb
- Genres: Non-fiction, collections

Alexander Crawford Lamb (21 February 1843 – 29 April 1897) was a Scottish hotelier, art collector, antiquarian and writer. He amassed a considerable collection of paintings, literary works, china, furniture antiquities and other ephemera and memorabilia. His most notable literary achievement was the publication of a massive volume entitled Dundee: its Quaint and Historic Buildings (1895).

== Life ==
A. C. Lamb was born in Dundee on 21 February 1843. He was the son of Thomas Lamb, who founded Lamb's Temperance Hotel in Murraygate, Dundee in 1828, and of Jessie Crawford. Lamb was educated at the High School of Dundee before being apprenticed to the baking and confectionery trade. After completing his apprenticeship he went to Liverpool, Manchester, and to Edinburgh to gain experience in hotel management. In 1867, Lamb was given charge of a temperance hotel established at 64 Reform Street, (the building was recently headquarters of the Alliance Trust). Soon after, the Murraygate hotel was sold off, and he took over the family business when his father died in 1869. On 3 July 1872, he married Mary Ann Worrall (1851–1937) in Dundee and they had two sons and four daughters. They were Mary (b. 1873), Jessie (b. 1879), Helen Kidd (b. 1881), Thomas Crawford (b. 1883), Maggie Robertson (b. 1885) and George Buxton (b. 1887). In 1878, Lamb was made a member of the Society of Antiquaries. He was also a member of the Fine Art Committee in Dundee, of the Graphic Arts Association (now the Dundee Art Society) of the Edinburgh Bibliographical Society, and other societies. He died in London on 29 April 1897.

== The Lamb Collection ==
Lamb's hotel business was very successful and presumably provided the financial means whereby he amassed the immense Lamb Collection which "now forms one of the largest and most varied collections of local history material in Scotland". On his death the collection was acquired by Edward Cox and donated to the City of Dundee. The artefacts are now in the City Museum and over 450 boxes of written and printed material are available and catalogued at the Local History Centre in Dundee Central Library, Wellgate, Dundee. His library included quarto and folio works of Shakespeare, and first editions of Burns, Scott, Dickens and Ruskin. In particular, he collected items pertaining to the history of Dundee. "Views of old buildings, examples of early and recent typography, consecutive specimens of Dundee journalism, coins, medals, and tokens, and relics of almost every conceivable kind which illustrated the evolution of the city's trade and commerce, were obtained, carefully stored, and zealously guarded." This collection formed the basis of exhibitions in 1892–93 and 1896, the catalogues of which are mentioned below.

=== Dundee: Its Quaint and Historic Buildings (1895) ===
This book contains large and impressive lithographs of around fifty quaint buildings, streets and closes demolished in the 1870s onwards, together with authoritative historical descriptions of them. Their locations are pinpointed on an 18th-century map of the city also included. Queen Victoria was presented with a particularly lavish copy of the book (it is perhaps the copy now available in the British Library). It was reviewed in The Spectator of 19 October 1895: "Mr Lamb deserves high praise for his painstaking and interesting work, which must have cost many years of self-denying labour. It is too large and costly to pass into the hands of the general public, though a judicious selection might easily be made for their use; but many in Dundee can well afford to purchase it, and they ought not to miss the opportunity of possessing themselves of a splendid memorial of their ancient city.... A word of praise must be given to the illustrations which adorn Mr Lamb's sumptuous volume."

=== Publications ===
- The Dundee Register of Merchants and Trades, with all the public offices, &c. for M, DCC, LXXXIII. A reprint in facsimile, edited by A. C. Lamb, of the first number of the "Dundee Register." Dundee [printed], 1782, [reprinted], 1879.
- "Bibliography of Dundee Periodical Literature, 1775–1891". Scottish Notes and Queries. Aberdeen: D. Wyllie & Son, 1890. Vol. III, Dec 1889 – May 1890 and Vol. IV, June 1890– May 1891. In a series of sixteen articles in this monthly journal, Lamb details exhaustively the periodical publications in Dundee from The Dundee Magazine of 1775 onwards.
- Guide to remarkable monuments in the Howff, Dundee, 1892.
- Dundee: Its Quaint and Historic Buildings. (The illustrations are from drawings made by William Gibb, David Small [1846–1927] and Charles S. Lawson [d. 1884].) Dundee: G. Petrie, 1895. In 2005, a facsimile copy of this book was published by the Tay Valley Family History Centre in Dundee.

=== Catalogues of the Lamb Collection ===
- Catalogue of "Old Dundee" – A Pictorial and Historical Exhibition, Illustrative of the Past Life, Social, Political, Municipal, and Industrial, of the Ancient Burgh of Dundee, 1892–93. Dundee: published by the Dundee Art Exhibition Committee, 1892.
- Catalogue of the Burns, Scott, and Shakespeare exhibition comprising books, manuscripts, engravings, medals, &c. from the collection of A.C. Lamb ... by Alexander Crawford Lamb; James Duncan, of Dundee.; Alexander Balharrie; Dundee (Scotland). Free Libraries. Victoria galleries. Dundee: J. Leng, 1896.
- Dowell, Alexander. Catalogue of the select and charming cabinet of modern paintings: valuable collection of medals, choice old cabinet china, camei, antiquities, etc., the property of the late A. C. Lamb, Esq., Dundee. [Edinburgh] [1898].
- Dowell, Alexander. Catalogue of the valuable library of standard literature, the fine collection of Burnsiana, including a unique copy of the first Kilmarnock edition, fine uncut copies of the first Edinburgh, London, and other early editions of the poems; second, third, and fourth folios and other editions of Shakepeare; Cruickankiana; first editions of Dickens; large and fine copies of the works of Bewick, Dibdin, Ruskin, Sir Walter Scott, and Tennyson; autograph letters, several finely illuminated manuscripts, and rare portraits and engravings. The property of the late A. C. Lamb, Esq., Dundee. To be Sold by Auction ... On Monday, 7th February, 1898, and Three following Days... [Edinburgh] [1898].
- Dowell, Alexander. Catalogue of the select and charming cabinet of modern paintings: valuable collection of medals, choice old cabinet china, camei, antiquities, etc., the property of the late A. C. Lamb, Esq., Dundee. [Edinburgh] [1898].
- John Maclachlan, A Brief Guide of the "Old Dundee" Historical Collection: Formed by the late Alex. C. Lamb, F.S.A. Scot., and presented by Edward Cox, Esq., M.A., of Cardean. [Dundee] Christmas, 1901.

=== Paintings catalogued in the Dundee Art Collection ===
- William Barclay (fl. 19th century) – Broughty Castle from the Stannergate – Cat. No. 1971/6.
- James Michael Brown (1854–1947) – The Poet William McGonagall – (charcoal) – Cat. No. 4/41.
- William B. Lamont (1857–1924) – The Poet William McGonagall (1830–1902) – (oil on canvas) – Cat. No. 16/12.
- Unknown Artist – Portrait of a Lady – (oil – bust; full face) – Cat. No. 1971/131.

== Sources ==
- British Library catalogue
- National Library of Scotland catalogue
- Worldcat

Dundee Libraries, Local History Centre (Accessed 2012-10-03):

- Lamb Collection
- Biography of Lamb
- Obituaries of Lamb
- Contents of the Lamb Collection
