= William Aitken (pathologist) =

Scottish pathologist (1825–1892)

Sir William Aitken FRS (1825–1892) was a Scottish pathologist.

== Life ==
The eldest son of William Aitken, a medical practitioner of Dundee, he was born there on 23 April 1825. Educated at the High School of Dundee, he was apprenticed to his father, and at the same time attended the practice of the Dundee Royal Infirmary. In 1842, he matriculated at the University of Edinburgh, and in 1848 graduated M.D., obtaining a gold medal for his thesis £On Inflammatory Effusions into the Substance of the Lungs as modified by Contagious Fevers".

In October 1842, Aitken was appointed demonstrator of anatomy at the University of Glasgow, under Allen Thomson, and also pathologist to the Glasgow Royal Infirmary. He held these posts to 1855. He was sent to the Crimea War zone under Robert Dyer Lyons, as assistant pathologist to the commission investigating disease in British troops. In 1860, he was selected as professor of pathology at the army medical school at Fort Pitt, Chatham, later at Netley Hospital. He retired in April 1892 in poor health, and died that year on 25 June. A portrait by William R. Symonds was at Netley Hospital.

== Awards and honours ==
Aitken was elected a Fellow of the Royal Society in 1873 and was knighted at the Golden Jubilee of Queen Victoria in 1887. In the following year, he received the honorary degrees of LL.D. from the universities of Edinburgh and Glasgow.

== Works ==
His works include a well-known Handbook of the Science and Practice of Medicine, 1857, 7th edit. 1880; 'An Essay on the Growth of the Recruit and Young Soldier,' 2nd edit. 1887; and an unfinished 'Catalogue of the Pathological Museum at Netley Hospital.'

== Family ==
Aitken married in 1884 Emily Clara, daughter of Henry Allen, Esq., who survived him. This was not his first marriage: on his marriage certificate to Emily Clara Foster in 1884, it stated he was a widower. William Aitken, son of William Aitken, marriage to Emily Clara Foster on 29 Apr 1884 in St. Martin In The Fields, Westminster, Middlesex, England. He was a widower and Emily was a spinster. Her father was Henry Foster, a coach builder and his father, William was a surgeon. William was living at 19A Clifford Street & Bond Street, Middlesex. No children have been found from either marriage.
