= Hilda Lorimer =

British classical scholar (1873–1954)

- Born: Elizabeth Hilda Lockhart Lorimer; 30 May 1873; Edinburgh, Scotland
- Died: 1 March 1954 (aged 80)

Academic background
- Education: High School of Dundee
- Alma mater: Girton College, Cambridge

Academic work
- Discipline: Classics
- Sub-discipline: Homer; Classical archaeology; Ancient Greece
- Institutions: Somerville College, Oxford

Elizabeth Hilda Lockhart Lorimer (30 May 1873 – 1 March 1954) was a British classical scholar who spent her career at Oxford University. Her best known work was in the field of Homeric archaeology and ancient Greece, but she also visited and published on Turkey, Albania and the area that later became Yugoslavia. She took the position of vice-principal of Somerville College during the Second World War.

== Family ==
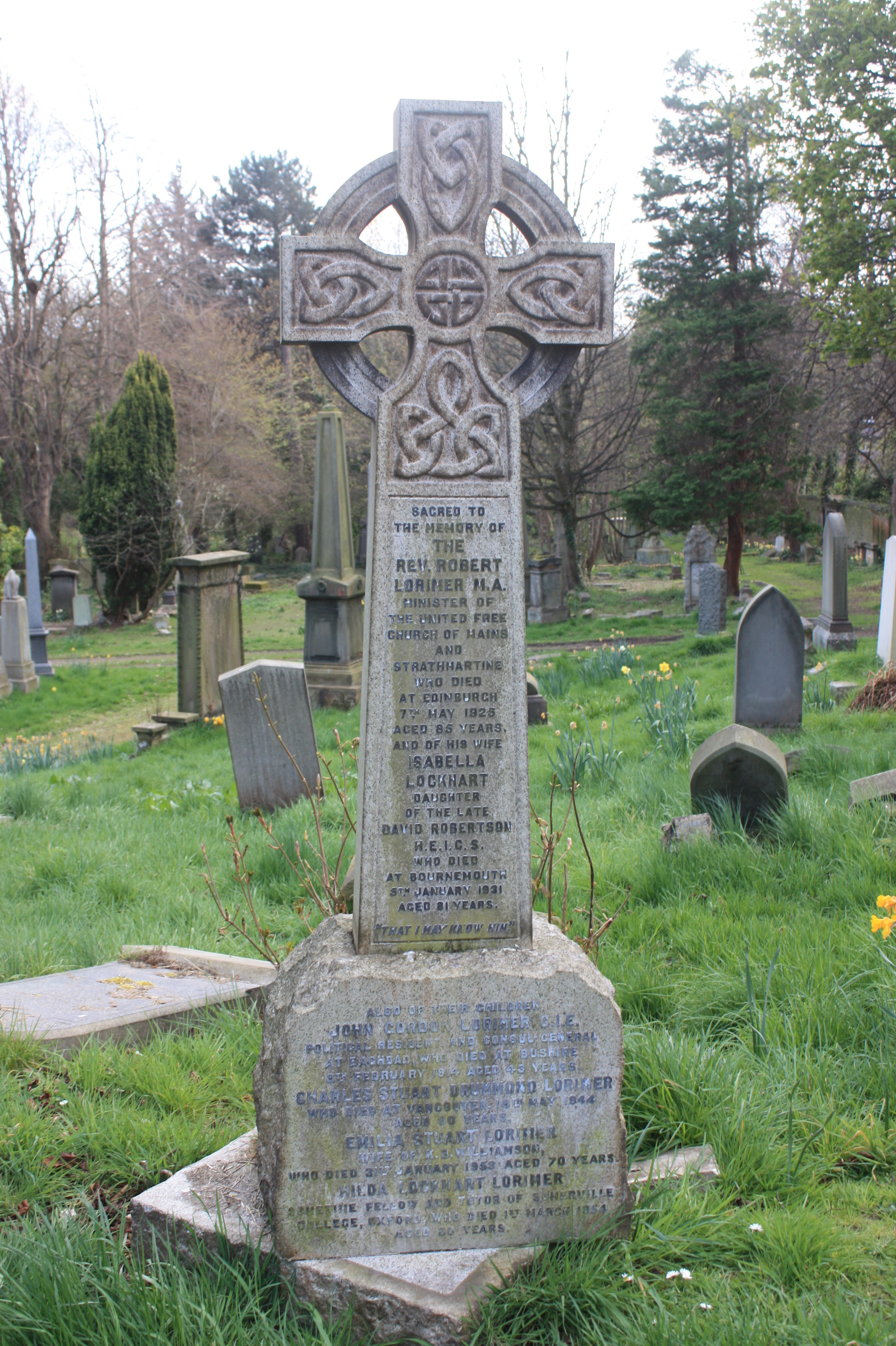
The grave of Hilda Lockhart Lorimer, Warriston Cemetery

Lorimer was born on 30 May 1873 in Edinburgh, Scotland. She was the second of eight children born to Reverend Robert Lorimer and his wife. Her brother, David Lockhart Robertson Lorimer, was a lieutenant-colonel in the British Indian Army, a linguist and a political official in the British Indian government. Her brothers, Gordon and Bert, worked in the civil administration in the Indian Political Service. Another, William, became Professor of Classics at St Andrews. Her sister, Emilia, became a notable poet, and her other sister, Florence, served as personal secretary to Aurel Stein at the British Museum. It was said that she could speak ancient Greek and Latin by the age of five.

She never used her first name; her family called her Hiddo; and at Oxford she came to be known as Highland Hilda because of her Scottish background.

== Education ==
Lorimer attended the High School of Dundee in Scotland from 1889 to 1893, walking five miles daily from home in order to attend. She was granted a scholarship to Girton College at Cambridge University, where she earned a first. Her degree was only officially awarded at the first Cambridge degree-giving ceremony to award degrees to women, in 1948, fifty-five years after she had joined Girton as a student.

== Career ==
In 1896, she became a fellow and tutor of Classics at Somerville College, Oxford, which is where she spent the rest of her career. At Somerville, she had little contact with colleagues. She was noted for her Saturday ornithology expeditions, which continued throughout her career in Oxford, and gained somewhat of a reputation for eccentricity and invincibility.

She was a skilled Latin linguist, but at Oxford her interests turned toward archaeology. She took a sabbatical to attend the British School at Athens in 1901 and 1902. There she began focusing on Homeric archaeology, the study of ancient civilisations known through the poems of Homer. In 1911, she participated in excavations at Phylakopi on Melos. Dorothy Lamb, Lillian Tenant and Lorimer were the first women to participate in an excavation conducted by the British School at Athens. The excavation, led by Richard MacGillivray Dawkins, the director of the British School, was conducted from March to May 1911. The project was a supplementary excavation of a site that had been explored from 1896 to 1899.

At Somerville, one of her students was Vera Brittain. In 1916, she was working in the Naval Intelligence Department of the Admiralty; in the following year she went to Salonica as a nursing orderly in the Scottish Women's Hospital (the Girton and Newnham Unit).

Lorimer took an Oxford MA at the first opportunity, in 1920, and a Cambridge MA in 1948. She returned to Athens in 1922 and became a university lecturer at Oxford from 1929 to 1937, serving also at Somerville as tutorial fellow of Classics until 1934, and of classical archaeology from 1934 to 1939. In 1935 she gave a well-received paper for the Classical Association on "Temple and Statue Cult in Homer" at the Ashmolean. In the same year, she was elected the Lady Carlisle Research Fellow at Somerville. She retired in 1939, but remained an honorary fellow. She served as an A.R.P. incident officer in both Oxford and Southampton during the Second World War, despite her advanced age, training at the age of sixty-seven.

She died on 1 March 1954 and is buried with her siblings in Warriston Cemetery in north Edinburgh. The grave lies to the south-west of the now-sealed eastern entrance.

== Publications ==
Lorimer published extensively on Homeric studies throughout her career, but her seminal work came late in life with the publication of Homer and the Monuments. Its publication was delayed until 1950 by the Second World War, so that she was seventy-seven by the time it was published.
