= High School of Dundee =

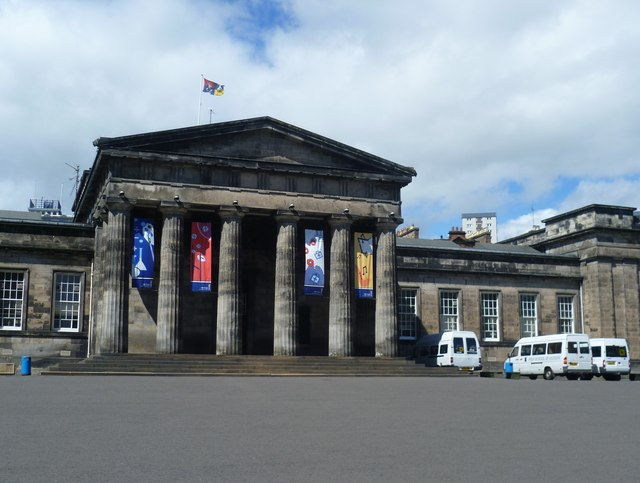
- School coat of arms, granted 21 April 1938 High School of Dundee building

Location
- Euclid Crescent; Dundee, DD1 1HU; Scotland; 56.4628°N 2.9730°W

Information
- Type: Private day school
- Motto: Prestante Domino "With God As Our Guide"
- Established: 1239; 787 years ago
- Founders: The Abbot and Monks of Lindores Abbey
- Chairman of Directors: David Thomson
- Rector: Irfan Latif
- Gender: Co-educational
- Age: 3 to 18
- Enrolment: 1000 (Approx)
- Houses: Airlie, Aystree, Lindores, Wallace
- Colour
- Publication: The Columns (school newspaper)
- Website: https://www.highschoolofdundee.org.uk

The High School of Dundee is a private, co-educational, day school in Dundee, Scotland, which provides nursery, primary and secondary education to just over one thousand pupils. Its foundation has been dated to 1239, and it is the only private school in Dundee.

The school's rector is a member of the Headmasters' and Headmistresses' Conference.

The school has been registered as a charity in Scotland since July 1897.

== History ==
=== The Grammar School ===
The school has origins in the Grammar School of Dundee founded by the abbot and monks of Lindores Abbey after they were granted a charter by Gregory, Bishop of Brechin, in the early 1220s to "plant schools wherever they please in the burgh". Their rights were confirmed by a papal bull conferred by Pope Gregory IX on 14 February 1239. It is from this bull that the school's Latin motto "Prestante Domino", translated as "Under the Leadership of God", is taken. Little information survives about the early grammar school: it would have taught a Latin curriculum to boys from Dundee and the surrounding area. In 1434, the teaching methods of the Master, Gilbert Knight, were challenged by John, Bishop of Brechin, who conferred Laurence Lownan as the new Master in Knight's place.

Dundee was a hotbed of the Reformation, and St Mary's Church had, according to John Knox, the first truly reformed congregation in Scotland. The school itself was the earliest reformed school in the country, having adopted the new religion in 1554 under the master, Thomas Makgibbon, with the assistance of the (by-now Protestant) Dundee Town Council. However, John, the Abbot of Lindores, stepped in to take control of the school which his predecessors had founded, replacing Makgibbon nominally with the Vicar of St. Mary's, John Rolland, who was given the power to appoint substitutes; this he did, his substitutes opening schools in opposition to the Grammar School, poaching its pupils. In the ensuing furore the Town Council, which approved of Makgibbon's methods, intervened to prevent rival schools.

Among other early masters was John Fethy, who left Scotland for Wittenberg from Dundee, having come into contact with Lutheran influences. He returned to Scotland around 1532 "the first organist that ever brought to Scotland the curious new fingering", that is, playing the organ with five fingers. Early scholars included Hector Boece, historian and first principal of the University of Aberdeen; William Wallace; and James, John and Robert Wedderburn, authors of The Gude and Godlie Ballatis, one of the most important literary works of the Scottish Reformation. After the Reformation, the Grammar School came under the auspices of Dundee Town Council. Greek was added to the curriculum shortly after 1562, under the Master Alexander Hepburn, who would author Grammaticae Artis Rudimenta Breviter et Dilucide Explicata, a Latin primer, in Dundee, and become bishop of Ross in 1574. Mary, Queen of Scots, also made an annual grant to the school in 1563, from the revenues of the church.

The school moved into its first permanent home in 1589, a building in St Clement's Lane demolished to make way for the City Square in the 1930s. Among the masters here were Andrew Duncan, an academic and Presbyterian minister, and David Lindsay, later Bishop of Edinburgh, who crowned Charles I at Holyrood. Pupils were still expected to speak only Latin – to ensure which, their schoolmates were to act as "clandestine captors". Boys entered at the age of eight, and stayed for seven years (two years longer than in other Scottish schools: in 1773, this was reduced to the customary five) at which point the boy could proceed to university. A boy had probably only two teachers in all this time: each of the three assistants, known as doctors, taught one class for three years, after which the rector would teach for two years.

=== Dundee Academy ===
The English School was founded by the burgh council in 1702, and was the successor to the pre-Reformation "Song School": it acted as a sort of elementary school for both sexes. It stood in School Wynd, by the city churches, near to the present site of the Mercat Cross. The Grammar School shared a building with it from 1789, though the two remained separate.

In 1785, Dundee Academy was opened in the Nethergate, in a hospital building built by the Trinitarian Friars before the Reformation; today it is the site of St Andrews Roman Catholic Cathedral. This new school, also founded by the council, was "to instruct young gentlemen in mathematical learning, and the several branches of the science with which it is connected". Its first rector, James Weir, described as "a gentleman of considerable abilities, but rather a projector", took great interest in the problem of perpetual motion. The school closed down altogether in 1795 after its second master, James Ivory, had gone to be a professor at the Royal Military College. The academy re-opened in 1801, under Thomas Duncan, a brilliant mathematician: but after his appointment to the Regius Chair of Mathematics at the University of St Andrews in 1820 the school suffered. The author Robert Mudie also taught at the academy from 1808 to 1821.

=== Dundee Public Seminaries ===
For some years it had become apparent that the educational needs of the rapidly expanding burgh were inadequately met by the three burgh schools. In April 1829, a public meeting was held to consider the situation, where it was proposed to combine the schools within one building. Dundee Town Council had also been reviewing the position: following deliberations, it was decided that "the Magistrates and Town Council and all classes of the community shall unite in joint efforts for enlarging and improving the means of education in Dundee". The schools hitherto under the patronage of the council were to be reconstituted and handed over to a new body of directors, of whom ten were chosen by the council, and ten by the subscribers to the new buildings. Thus, the three schools were united in 1829 to form the Dundee Public Seminaries, and in 1832-4 the present school, to the design of Edinburgh architect George Angus, was built, a neo-classical building designed as part of the civic improvements in Dundee.

The school was opened on 1 October 1834. The total cost of the building, including the playground and enclosure (not completed until 1837) was £10,000, the greater portion of which was raised by public subscription. Though it had one building and one management, the three schools remained more or less distinct; conflicting claims for precedence led to no rector being appointed. The centre was assigned to the academy, the west wing to the Grammar School, and the east wing to the English School; the eight or nine headmasters acted independently, but presided in rotation over a Censor's Court, which dealt with matters of common concern. To this day, the heads of individual departments within the School are known as Headmasters, a unique reminder of this arrangement. From 1840, one of the directors was to exercise general supervision over the school as governor, or superintending director, with powers to "reform all abuses and irregularities".

=== The High School of Dundee ===
In 1859, a royal charter granted by Queen Victoria changed the name of the school to The High School of Dundee, and protected the rights of the Subscribers. In 1877, a new curriculum was introduced, and an inclusive fee charged: prior to this, pupils had attended such classes as they chose. The independent future of the school was threatened by the Education (Scotland) Act 1872, which made education compulsory and took over the running of parish schools from the Church of Scotland. Burgh as well as parish schools now came under school boards run by local committees, and similarly ancient schools in Edinburgh and Glasgow were taken over by their respective town councils. The Subscribers to the High School objected to this. The situation was worsened by a similar Act in 1878, and legal action looked inevitable, until an alumnus, William Harris, offered, in February 1881, to donate £30,000 for the purposes of higher education in Dundee on condition that the board give up all claim to the school. This agreement was incorporated in an Act of Parliament, the William Harris Endowment and Dundee Education Act, 1882. This act led to the appointment of a single rector of the High School of Dundee, and the foundation of Harris Academy. Thanks to Margaret Harris, who waived her right to a life-rent of her brother's estate, a girls' school was built across Euclid Crescent in two stages between 1886 and 1890. A further Act was passed in 1922, and the school's current constitution is embodied in 'The High School of Dundee Scheme, 1987', sanctioned by an Order of the Court of Session made under the Education (Scotland) Act 1980, in May 1992.

The school church is Dundee Parish Church (St Mary's), continuing a tradition that has existed since its foundation in the thirteenth century, and services and concerts are regularly held in the church.

The school has a total of 1040 pupils in prep-school and the senior school. Fees for the 2021–2022 session range from £9 618.00 to £13 650.00 per annum, depending on the year of study. The High School of Dundee was among the first Scottish charities investigated by the Office of the Scottish Charity Regulator for the public benefit derived from their tax-exempt status, and was the first independent school in the United Kingdom judged to have demonstrated its charitable aims and "local and national benefit". The High School was voted Scottish Independent Secondary School of the Year 2008 by The Times.

== Buildings and grounds ==
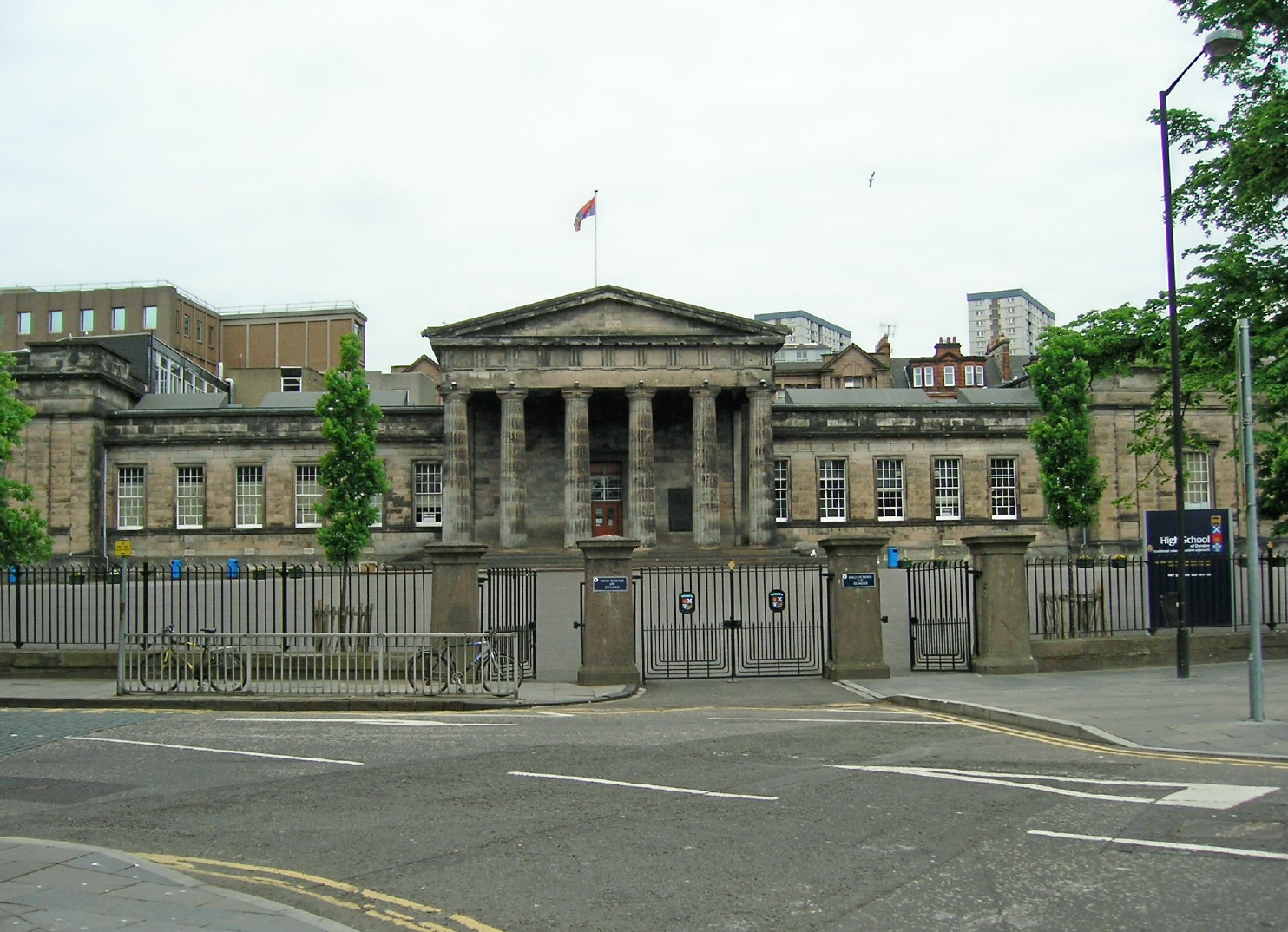
The Boys School of 1834

The High School of Dundee is situated in seven buildings in the city centre:

- the Main Building (traditionally the Boys School)
- the Margaret Harris Building (traditionally the Girls School)
- the Robert Fergusson Building
- Trinity Meadowside, a former church, designed by David Bryce
- Bonar House (soon to be discarded off)
- Baxter Hall
- the Lodge

There are also two main playing grounds, Dalnacraig and Mayfield, approximately one mile from the school, at which sports such as hockey, tennis, rugby, football, cricket, and athletics are played. Mayfield has undergone massive investment in recent years with new sports facilities, and is the home of Dundee High School Former Pupils' RFC; it is also let out to other groups. The school holds an annual sports day at the Mayfield playing grounds in June where the four school houses compete against each other throughout the day.

== Staff Bullying ==
In 2019, the school was required to pay £60,000 as a result of unfairly dismissing the principal teacher of religious, moral and philosophical studies. The court found that the rector's treatment of the teacher was "extremely threatening and unpleasant". Judge Ian McFatridge said that evidence from Dr Halliday and Lise Hudson, his deputy and named successor, was not credible or reliable: the school did not contest the ruling.

== Notable alumni ==
- Sir William Aitken (1825–1892), pathologist
- Andrew Macbeth Anderson (1862–1936), Senior Scottish judge, Solicitor General for Scotland (1911–1913) and Liberal MP for North Ayrshire 1910–1911
- Sir David Anderson (1880–1953), civil engineer and lawyer
- Alexander Balfour (1824–1886), merchant
- Charles Coupar Barrie, 1st Baron Abertay (1875–1940), politician
- William Edward Baxter (1825–1890), politician and author
- Mark Beaumont (born 1983), Adventurer and former record-holder for around world cycle
- General Sir John Bell (1782–1876), British general and Lieutenant Governor of Guernsey
- Lara Bird (born 1998), politician
- Hector Boece (c. 1465–1536), Historian, first Principal of the University of Aberdeen, (1500–1536)
- H. N. Brailsford (1873–1958), journalist and author
- William Thomas Calman (1871–1952), zoologist, Keeper of Zoology at the British Museum
- George Chalmers (1900–1951), cricketer
- Robert William Chapman (1881–1960), literary scholar and publisher
- Sir Andrew Clark, first baronet (1826–1893), physician
- Nancy K. Conn (1919–2013), bacteriologist
- Peter Chalmers Cowan (1859–1930), civil engineer
- William Cullen, Baron Cullen of Whitekirk, KT (born 1935), Lord President of the Court of Session, 2001–2005
- Ramsay Robertson Dalgety (born 1945), Judge of the Supreme Court, 1991–95, and Acting Chief Justice of Tonga, (1991–94)
- George Elder Davie (1912–2007), philosopher, lecturer at the University of Edinburgh
- George Dempster (1732–1818), lawyer and politician
- Alasdair Dickinson (born 1983), Scottish Rugby International
- Adam Duncan, 1st Viscount Duncan of Camperdown (1731–1804), Admiral of the Royal Navy
- Dave Duncan (1933-2018), author
- John Duncan (1866–1945), painter and illustrator
- Alan Stewart Duthie (1938–2013), Linguist who helped establish this field at the University of Ghana.
- Zander Fagerson (born 1996), Scottish Rugby International
- Robert Fergusson (1750–1774), poet
- Robert Fleming (1845–1933), financier
- Neil Forsyth (born 1978), writer
- John Scott Fulton, Baron Fulton (1902–1986), first Vice-Chancellor of the University of Sussex and public servant
- George Gledstanes (Gladstanes) (c. 1562–1615), archbishop of St Andrews
- Anne Glover (born 1956), Professor of Molecular & Cell Biology at the University of Aberdeen, Chief Scientific Adviser for Scotland (since 1996)
- Sir Alexander Gray (1882–1968), Jaffrey Professor of Political Economy at the University of Aberdeen and poet
- Frank Hadden (born 1954), ex-Scottish rugby union coach
- James Haldane (1768–1851), Baptist minister and author
- Robert Haldane (1764–1842), theological writer and evangelical patron
- Thomas James Henderson (1798–1844), astronomer
- Sir James Ivory (1765–1842), FRS
- James Ivory, Lord Ivory (1792–1866), judge
- Francis Robert Japp (1848–1928), chemist
- Alexander Crawford Lamb (1843–1897), Dundee hotelier, antiquarian and art collector.
- Alexander Leighton (1800–1874), writer and literary editor
- David Lockhart Robertson Lorimer (1876–1962), diplomat and linguist
- William Laughton Lorimer (1885–1967), classical scholar and translator
- Very Rev Dr Finlay MacDonald (born 1945), Principal Clerk to the General Assembly of the Church of Scotland, Moderator of the General Assembly (2002–2003)
- Sir George Mackenzie of Rosehaugh (1636–1691), Lord Advocate, writer, founder of the Advocates' Library, the precursor to the National Library of Scotland
- Iain MacMillan (1938–2006), photographer
- Eilish McColgan (1990), athlete
- Air Marshal Iain McNicoll (born 1953), Deputy Commander-in-Chief Operations, RAF Air Command
- Andrew Marr (born 1959), journalist
- Fred Miller (1863–1924), editor of The Daily Telegraph, 1923–1924
- Andy Nicol (born 1971), ex-Scottish rugby international
- Sir Alan Peacock (1922–2014), economist, Vice-Chancellor of the University of Buckingham, (1983–1984)
- Walter Perry (1921–2003), Lord Perry of Walton, first Vice-Chancellor of the Open University
- Jon Petrie (born 1976), ex-Scottish rugby international
- Sir Hugh Lyon Playfair (1786–1861), army officer and Provost of St Andrews
- Chris Rea (born 1943), ex-Scotland and British Lions Rugby international
- Earl Reoch (1942–1989), cricketer
- Dr Bill Robertson CBE, MC, (1885–1942), army medical officer and member of the first official British Lions rugby tour in 1910
- Donald MacArthur Ross, Lord Ross (born 1927), Lord Justice Clerk (1985–1997)
- Richard Ross (born 1957), songwriter and frontman for Deacon Blue
- John Russell (1887–1965), cricketer
- Henry Scrimgeour (Scrymgeour) (1505?–1572), diplomat and book collector, Professor of Philosophy and Civil Law in the University of Geneva.
- William Small (1734–1775), Professor at the College of William and Mary, physician
- Norman Kemp Smith (1872–1958), Professor of Logic and Metaphysics at the University of Edinburgh
- James S. Stewart (1896–1990), Theologian, Moderator of the General Assembly of the Church of Scotland, (1963–1964)
- Brian Taylor (born 1955), BBC journalist
- David Taylor (1954–2014), General Secretary of UEFA
- Thomas Thomson (1773–1852), Scottish chemist, whose writings contributed to the early spread of Dalton's atomic theory.
- David Coupar Thomson (1861–1954), newspaper proprietor
- KT Tunstall (born 1975), singer-songwriter
- Joanna Vanderham (1990), actress
- Richie Vernon (born 1987), Scottish Rugby International
- Sir James Walker (1863–1935), Professor of Chemistry at University College, Dundee, and the University of Edinburgh
- Mike Watson (born 1949), Baron Watson of Invergowrie
- Preston Watson (1880–1915), pioneer of aviation, argued to have made the world's first powered flight
- Very Rev Dr James Weatherhead (1931–2017), Principal Clerk to the General Assembly of the Church of Scotland (1985–1996), Moderator of the General Assembly (1993–1994)
- James Wedderburn (c. 1495–1553), John Wedderburn (c. 1505–1556), and Robert Wedderburn (c. 1510–c.1555), religious reformers
- James Wedderburn (1585–1639), bishop of Dunblane (1636–1638)
- Sir Peter Young (1544–1628), tutor to James VI and diplomat

== See also ==
- List of the oldest schools in the United Kingdom
