= Tinsmith =

Person who makes and repairs things made of tin or other light metals

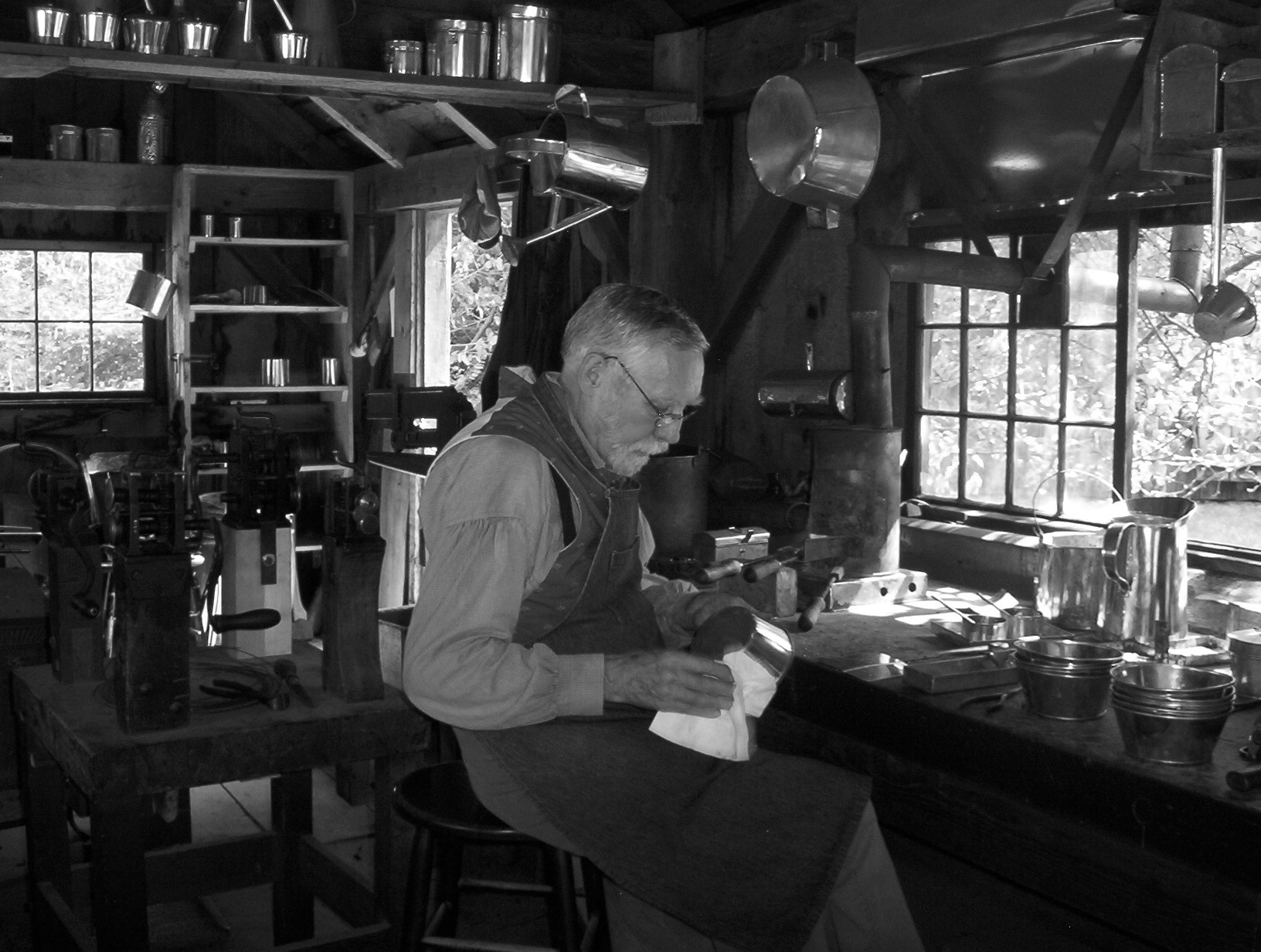
A tinsmith at Old Sturbridge Village

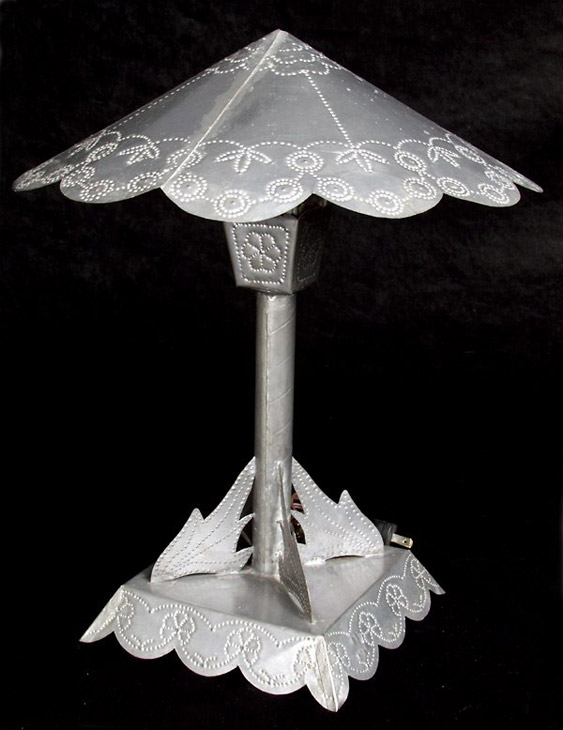
Tinware desk lamp, late 1930s, Bandelier National Monument. Made by a Civilian Conservation Corps tinsmith.

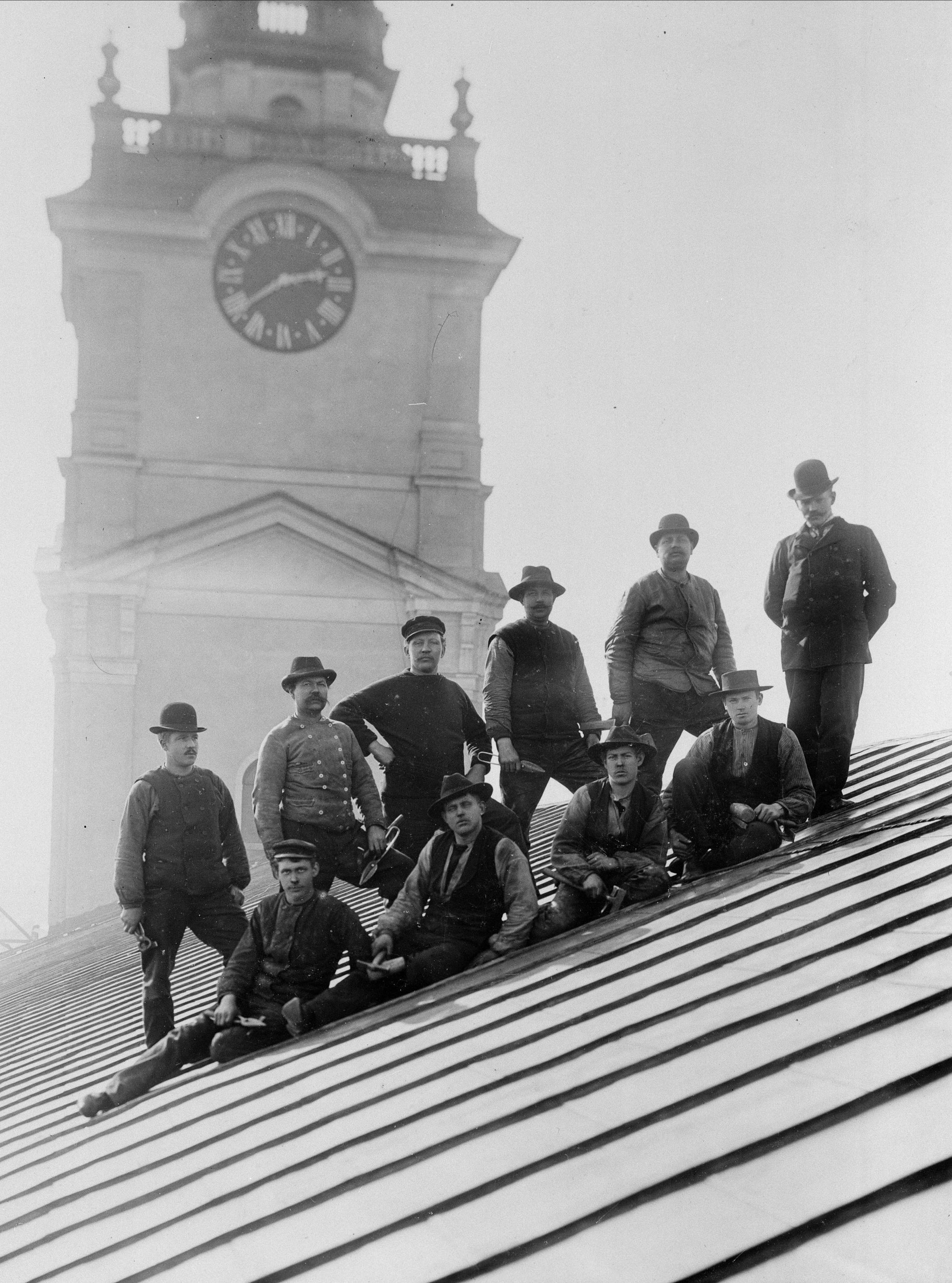
Tinsmiths on the roof of Storkyrkan, Stockholm, 1903

A tinsmith is a historical term for a skilled craftsperson who makes and repairs things made of tin or other light metals. The profession was also known as a tinner, tinker, tinman, or tinplate worker; whitesmith may also refer to this profession, though the same word may also refer to an unrelated specialty of iron-smithing. By extension it can also refer to the person who deals in tinware, or tin plate. Tinsmith was a common occupation in pre-industrial times.

Unlike blacksmiths (who work mostly with hot metals), tinsmiths do the majority of their work on cold metal (although they might use a hearth to heat and help shape their raw materials). Tinsmiths fabricate items such as water pitchers, forks, spoons, and candle holders.

== Training of tinsmiths ==
Tinsmiths learned their trade, like many other artisans, by serving an apprenticeship of 4–6 years with a master tinsmith. Apprenticeships were considered "indentures", and an apprentice would start first with simply cleaning the shop, polishing tools, keeping the fires lit, filing sharp edges, and polishing finished pieces. Later, apprentices would trace patterns on sheets and cut them out, then solder joints and insert rivets. Finally, an apprentice was allowed to cut out and complete objects. Apprentices learned first to make cake stamps (cookie cutters), pillboxes and other simple items. Next, they formed objects such as milk pails, basins, or cake and pie pans. Later they tackled more complicated pieces such as chandeliers and crooked-spout coffee pots.

After completing an apprenticeship, a tinsmith then became a journeyman, not yet being a master smith who employed others. Many young tinsmiths took to the road as peddlers or tinkers to save enough money to open a shop in town.

== Raw material ==
Tinplate consists of sheet iron coated with tin and then run through rollers. This process was first discovered in the 16th century, with the development of the British tinplate address in 1661 with a patent to Dud Dudley and William Chamberlayne. Previously Great Britain had imported most tinplate from Hamburg.

The British Iron Act of 1749 prohibited (among other things) the erection of new rolling mills, which prevented the erection of new tinplate works in America until after the American Revolution. Certificates submitted by colonial governors to the British Board of Trade following the Act indicate that no tinplate works then existed though there were several slitting mills, some described as slitting and rolling mills.

Pure tin is an expensive and soft metal and it is not practical to use it alone. However, it could be alloyed with lead and copper to make pewter or alloyed with copper alone to produce bronze. Today's tinplate is mild steel electroplated with tin. Tin's non-rusting qualities make it an invaluable coating. However, the tinplate's quality depends on the iron or steel being free from rust and the surface being in an unbroken coating. A piece of tinware may develop rust if the tin coating has worn away or been cut in the metal. The respective properties of the metals mean that corrosion once started is likely to be rapid.

== Tinsmithing tools ==
The simple shapes made by the tinsmith require tools similar to those of a coppersmith. In addition to the big shears anchored in a hole in their bench, tinsmiths used hand snips and nippers for cutting. The tin was flattened on an anvil made of a block of steel. Straight and curved anvils (stakes) were used to turn and roll the edges of the tin. Solder was then used to join the pieces together; a soldering iron and fire pot were needed to do this.

Hammers are essential. Planishing hammers, chasing hammers, creasing hammers, and setting down hammers are among the most common, as well as ball peen hammers. Horn or wooden mallets are also used. Before electric soldering irons became available, tinsmiths would use heated "copper" irons made of a wooden handle, iron shank, and copper tips formed into different shapes. These items were heated in small furnaces, covered in sal ammoniac, and then used for soldering seams.

== History of tinsmithing ==
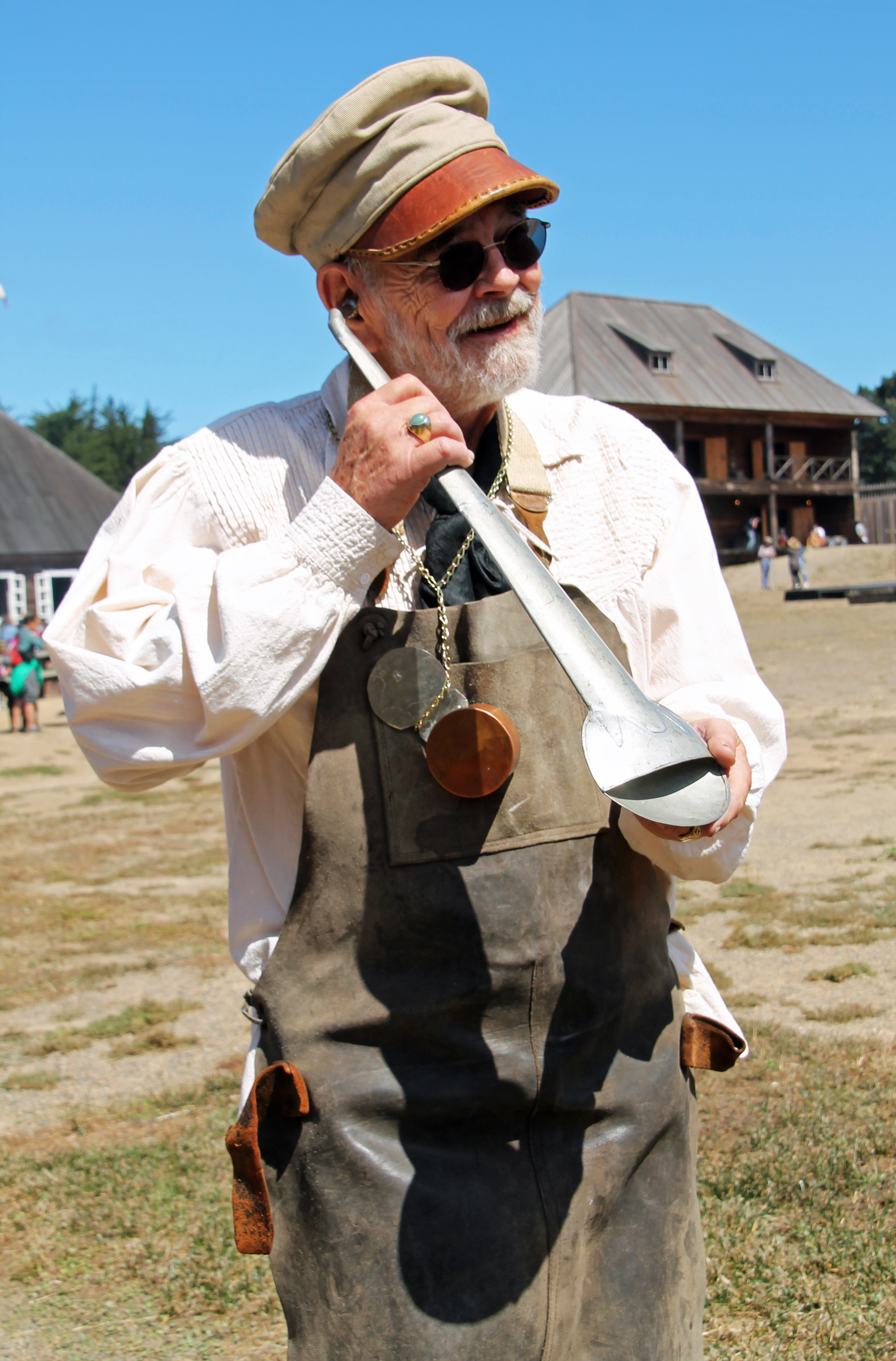
Contemporary tinsmith who also serves as a reenactor at Fort Ross State Historic Park, standing with an ear trumpet, a 19th-century hearing aid

Tinwares were being produced in London by the 1630s, and were known as Crooked Lane Wares (from the street where they were made). The Worshipful Company of Tin Plate Workers were incorporated as a separate Livery Company of the City of London in 1670. However, tinplate workers were widespread.

Tinsmiths have been plying their trade in America since 1720. Colonial tinsmiths used tinplate, wire, solder, and a few simple tools to produce their wares. When tinplate was finally produced in America in the early 19th century, tin products became more widely available. Demand for tinsmiths increased, and there was a need to speed up production. This brought about the development of many ingenious hand-powered machines that sped up production and helped the tinsmith meet the demands for products. The goods were "brought to market" by peddlers.

Tinware was a popular folk art in colonial Mexico and New Mexico, and continues to be made there by local artisans today.
