= Robert Shedden Scrimgeour =

Scottish aristocrat

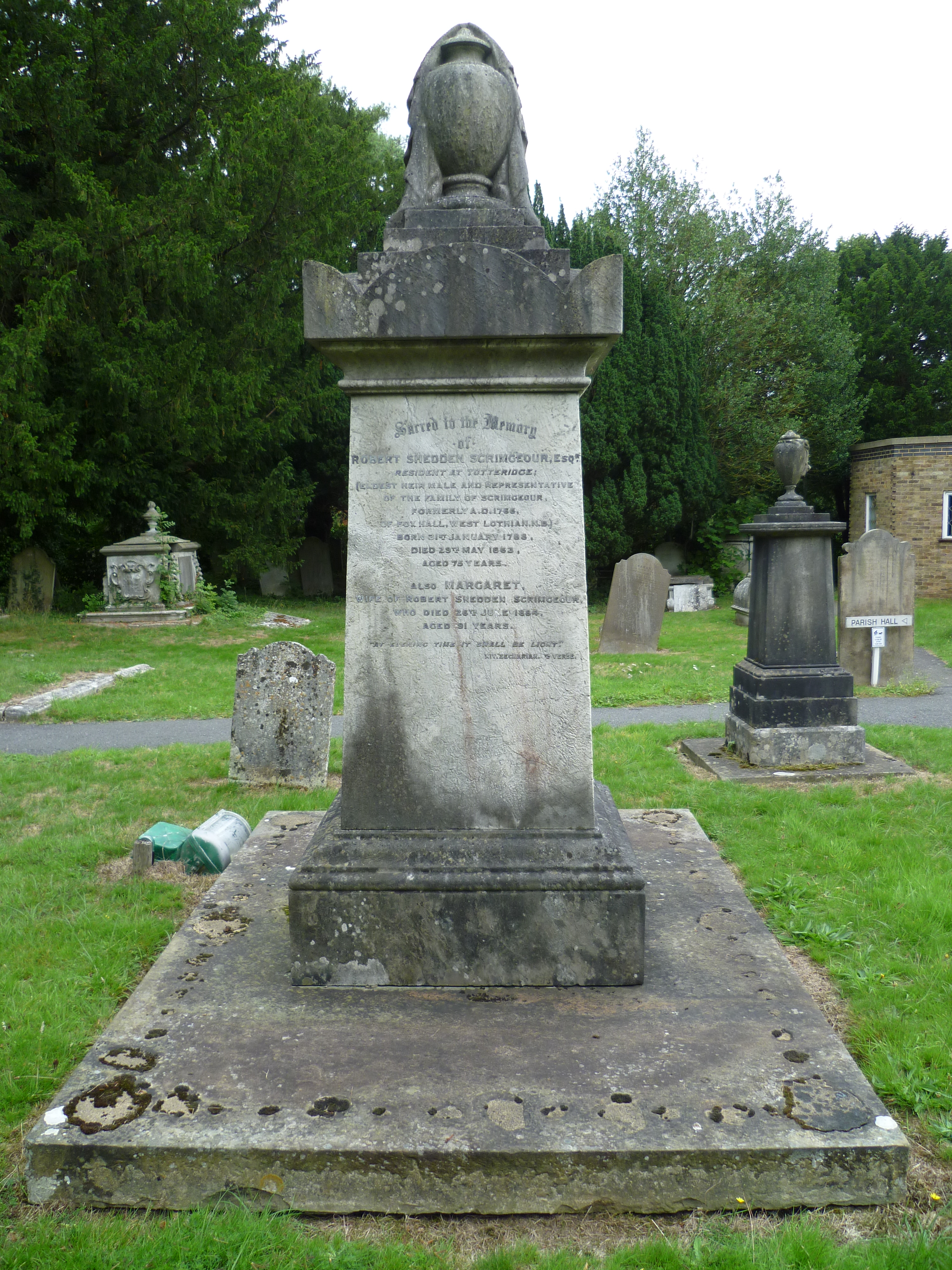
The Scrimgeour family grave at St Andrew's church, Totteridge.

Robert Shedden Scrimgeour (31 January 1788 – 29 May 1863) was a Scottish aristocrat who claimed, as the eldest male heir of his line, to be the hereditary standard bearer of Scotland. Scrimgeour was a stockbroker and member of Lloyd's of London.

In 1826, Scrimgeour married Margaret, eldest daughter of James Wilson, professor of anatomy to the Royal College of Surgeons, London. Margaret died on 26 June 1884. They had children Janet (youngest daughter), who died aged 50 on 28 November 1882 and an only son, Charles James, who died 8 July 1893.

The Scrimgeours were resident at Totteridge, Hertfordshire, for many years and also had a home at 25 Mortimer Street in London.

Scrimgeour died 29 May 1863 and is buried at St Andrew's church, Totteridge.
