= Emily Lorimer =

Journalist, writer, linguist, political analyst

- Emily Lorimer, taken at home by her husband in 1911
- Born: Emily Overend; 10 August 1881; Dublin, Ireland
- Died: June 1949 (aged 67); Hatfield, Hertfordshire, United Kingdom
- Education: Trinity College Dublin; Somerville College, Oxford

Emily Overend Lorimer OBE (10 August 1881-June 1949), also published as E. O. Lorimer, was an Anglo-Irish journalist, linguist, political analyst, and writer.

== Life ==
Emily Martha Overend was born in Dublin on 10 August 1881, the daughter of Thomas George Overend, barrister and county court judge, and his wife Hannah (née Kingsbury). She had a sister and two brothers. They were an Anglo-Irish family and Lorimer was educated in Trinity College Dublin where she studied Modern Languages and finished there in 1904. She went on to finish her education at Somerville College, Oxford in 1906. Lorimer spend 1907 in Munich at the University. She married David Lockhart Robertson Lorimer in 1910 in Christ Church, Leeson Park, Dublin.

She worked as a tutor in Germanic Philology for Somerville College, Oxford, where, in her spare time, she learned Sanskrit. David's sister, Hilda took the position of vice-principal of Somerville College during the second world war. It was through her friendship with Hilda that Lorimer met her husband. Lorimer tended to go along with her husband's work and when he moved she travelled with him. She worked as his private secretary when he was in the Middle East. She also worked as editor of Basrah Times during World War I and she was connected with the Red Cross. Lorimer was a resident of Cairo during the Arab Revolt. During the 20s and 30s she was one of Britain's leading commentators on Adolf Hitler and Nazism. Working for Faber and Faber she translated his works along with other German language authors including Gustav Krist. Lorimer took up her scholarship when her husband retired in 1927. She had continued to learn new languages and study. She loved her husband having overseas postings. Lorimer was not in favour of Arab independence nor of Irish home rule. She did not believe in women's suffrage. However she described herself as passionate about Arab language and literature even if she was not able to understand the culture. She and her husband were awarded the Burton Memorial Medal by the Royal Asiatic Society in 1948. She had also been awarded an OBE.

The Lorimers adopted a daughter who later became Mrs. Munro.

== Bibliography ==
=== Author ===
- What Hitler Wants, 1939
- Language Hunting in the Karakoram, 1939

=== Translator ===
- Persian Tales, 1919
- Frederick the Second, 1194–1250, 1931: Translated from German
- His Excellency the Spectre: the life of Fritz von Holstein, 1933: Translated from German
- German's Third Empire, 1934: Translated from German
- Prisoner in the Forbidden Land, 1938: Translated from German
- Twilight in Vienna, 1938: Translated from German
- Christian the Ninth, 1939: Translated from German and Danish
- A scientist in Tartary: from the Hoang-ho to the Indus, 1939
- The sociology of the colonies, 1949
- Daily life in ancient Rome, 1941: Translated from French
- Alone through the forbidden land: journeys in disguise through soviet Central Asia, 1938
- Men of letters and the English public in the eighteenth century, 1660–1744, 1948
- Via Dolorosa, 1948: Translated from Dutch
- Cicero: the secrets of his correspondence, 1951: Translated from French

=== Editor ===
- The Arab of the desert: a glimpse into Badawin life in Kuwait and Sau'di Arabia by H.R.P. Dickson, 1949

=== Chapters ===
- Never again! (The fight against the lie), 1942
