= Scrymgeour =

Scrymgeour is a Scottish clan (Clan Scrymgeour) and may refer to:

- Alexander Scrymgeour, 12th Earl of Dundee (born 1949), Scottish nobleman
- David Scrymgeour, Canadian entrepreneur
- Edwin Scrymgeour (1866–1947), Member of Parliament (MP) for Dundee, Scotland
- Henry Scrymgeour-Wedderburn, 11th Earl of Dundee (1902–1983), Scottish nobleman and politician
- Rufus Scrimgeour, character in the Harry Potter universe
