= Henry Scrimgeour =

Henry Scrimgeour or Scrymgeour (c. 1505 – 23 September 1572) was a diplomat and book collector.

== Biography ==
He was born in Dundee, most likely in 1505, but possibly in 1508 or 1509, since Andrew Melville gives Scrimgeour's age at death as sixty-three.

Having first attended Dundee Grammar School, he then went to St Salvator's College, St Andrews, in 1532. He determined as a bachelor in 1533, and won first place in the examination for licence the following year. Some time later he proceeded to Paris where he studied under Guillaume Budé and Petrus Ramus. Shortly afterwards he went to Bourges to study civil law for four years under Éguinaire Baron and François Douaren. While in Bourges, he formed an acquaintance with Jacques Amyot, professor of Greek, and succeeded him in becoming preceptor to the sons of Guillaume Bochetel, the secretary of state, probably for three or four years. In February 1547 he returned to Scotland for a short stay and Bochetel recommended him in a letter to Mary of Guise.

Back in France in 1548, Scrimgeour then accompanied his pupil Bernardin Bochetel to Padua. Although a Catholic, he was plunged into the controversies of the Italian Reformation when he visited a young lawyer of Cittadella, Francesco Spiera, who was slowly dying of despair, having adopted the new opinions and then been forced to recant. Scrimgeour wrote an essay on piety, published at Geneva (under the name of Henricus Scotus) by Jean Gerard and with a preface by Jean Calvin dated December 1549, entitled "Exemplum memorabile desperationis in Francisco Spera, propter abiuratam fidei confessionem". The tract was republished the same year in Basel. Nonetheless, it was some years before Scrimgeour would openly show his adherence to protestantism, and his second publication was a law book, an edition of the Novellae, printed by Estienne in Geneva in May 1558 and subsidized by Ulrich Fugger, entitled: Impp. Justiniani, Justini, Leonis novellae constitutiones. The Novellae were fundamental to the teaching of law on the continent at this time, and a new edition was badly needed. Scrimgeour used his contacts with the French ambassador to Venice to gain access to the important Bessarian codex there, and his edition was well received by contemporary lawyers. The period between 1558 and his last visit to Italy in 1564 represents the most energetic part of Scrimgeour's activity in another capacity, that of book collector; it is accepted that the greatest part of the Greek, Latin, and Hebrew manuscripts of the Fugger collection were gathered by Scrimgeour, who frequently travelled between Augsburg and Italy. It is today the core of the Vatican Palatine collection. Scrimgeour also acted as agent in buying books for Otto-Heinrich, the elector palatine.

Scrimgeour kept his benefices in Scotland all his life, but he also enjoyed an income in France-—there exists an authorization given to him in 1556 by King Henri II to hold and receive benefices in his country of adoption. He also engaged on a diplomatic career, travelling to Padua, Venice, Florence, Rome, Milan, Mantua, and Bologna, and also to Bourges, where he tried unsuccessfully to set up a printing press. Bernandin Bochetel, now abbot of St Laurent des Aubats, had several times invited him to Vienna, and he finally went there in November 1560. Bochetel may have wanted his diplomatic services at this time to help him in difficult negotiations with the German Lutheran princes, or with the colloquy of Poissy of 1561 between French reformers and Catholics, or with the Council of Trent, which after a ten-year interval had resumed its sessions in January 1562. However, Scrimgeour's stay in Vienna was brief, for by the end of 1561 he was in Geneva.

Ulrich Fugger, now a Lutheran, had a plan for a public library in Geneva in order to secure his large and important collection of rare books, and Scrimgeour was associated with this project. At the same time, on 30 December, he was honoured by the magistrates of Geneva who received him as a burgess, three years after John Knox, and thanks to Calvin he soon became involved in the city's public life.

On 18 April 1562, with Calvin's blessing, Scrimgeour married Françoise de Saussure. However, Françoise died, on 1 February 1568, aged twenty-five, leaving a three-year-old daughter, Marie. In 1563 the Genevan pastors appointed Scrimgeour reader in philosophy, and the same year he was admitted to the town council of two hundred. Later he started giving lessons in civil law. When Calvin died in the spring of 1564 Scrimgeour was witness to his will. On 3 January 1570 Scrimgeour joined the council of sixty at Geneva, and on 11 May married Catherine de Veillet. That year, two regents-—the earls of Moray and Mar-—and also George Buchanan tried to attract Scrimgeour back to Scotland to assist in the education of the young James VI, but he declined, arguing his age and the instability of Scotland. Henry Scrimgeour died in Geneva on 23 September 1572.

== Sources ==
- Tucker, Marie-Claude. "Scrimgeour, Henry". Oxford Dictionary of National Biography (online ed.). Oxford University Press. doi:10.1093/ref:odnb/24968. (Subscription, Wikipedia Library access or UK public library membership required.). The first edition of this text is available at Wikisource: "Scrymgeour, Henry" . Dictionary of National Biography. London: Smith, Elder & Co. 1885–1900.
