= David Lockhart Robertson Lorimer =

British soldier, politician and linguist

Lieutenant-Colonel David Lockhart Robertson Lorimer CIE (24 December 1876 in Dundee – 26 February 1962) was a member of the British Indian Army, a political agent in the British Indian government and a noted linguist. The Indian Political Service extended to the Middle East, and he was British Political Representative in Cairo during the First World War.

== Early life ==
Lorimer was born near Dundee and was the son of a Presbyterian clergyman Robert Lorimer and his wife Isabella Lockhart Robertson. He was educated at the High School of Dundee. The family distinguished itself as colonial administrators and academics. His mother's family had long resided in India and in 1896 David Lorimer relocated to India following completion of his military training at Sandhurst. His siblings were all high achievers. His brothers Gordon and Bert also worked in the civil administration in the Indian Political Service. Another, William, became Professor of Classics at St Andrews and translated the New Testament into Scots. He also had three sisters, Hilda (Vice Principal of Somerville College, Oxford), Emilia (a poet), and Florence (who worked with Aurel Stein at the British Museum).

In 1910 Lorimer married Emily Overend of Dublin. Emily Overend Lorimer (1881–1949) was a noted journalist, writer and lecturer in German philosophy at Somerville. In the late 1920s and 1930s she became one of the leading commentators in Britain on Nazism and translated works of Adolf Hitler. She translated other German authors for the Faber and Faber publishing house including Gustav Krist. She was also an Oxford philologist, editor of the Basrah Times during the First World War, 1916–17, and had links to the Red Cross.

== Military and political career ==
From 1898 to 1903, Lorimer served in the Q.V.O. Corps of Guides, including a stint from 1901 to 1903 with the Khyber Rifles. From 1903 to 1924 he was on secondment to the Indian Political Service, generally serving in the Persian Gulf, then being opened up to oil exploration. During his career, he held various offices, including Vice Consul in Arabistan (Khuzestan Province) 1903–1909, Political Agent in Bahrain 1911–12 and consul in Kerman and Balochistan (1912–1914 and 1916–1917). Lorimer was the Political Agent in Gilgit from 1920 to 1924. During the First World War, he served in Cairo. He was appointed CIE in the 1917 Birthday Honours. He retired from the Army in 1927.

== Scholarly work ==
In addition to his military and political activities, Lorimer was a noted scholar of the peoples of Hunza and Gilgit. He worked as a linguist with the languages of Iran and Pakistan, including Khowar, Shina, Bakhtiari, Wakhi and the Persian dialects of Kerman and Gabri. He wrote a standard work on Burushaski, a language spoken only in the Karakoram in what is today Pakistan.

Lorimer was awarded the Leverhulme Research Fellowship in 1933–1935 and in 1953 he became an honorary member of the School of Oriental and African Studies (SOAS) at the University of London. His notes and correspondence are now kept in a library at SOAS and in the collections of the British Library.

== List of publications ==
- Pashtu, Part I: Syntax of Colonial Pashtu with chapters on the Persian and Indian elements in the modern language Oxford: Clarendon Press, 1915
- Persian Tales. Together with Hilda Roberts (illustrations) and Emily Overend Lorimer (translation), Macmillan & Co. 1919
- The Phonology of the Bakhtiari, Badakshani, and Madaglashti Dialects of Modern Persian. London 1922
- The Burushaski Language, Vol. I: Introduction and Grammar. Aschehoug, Oslo 1935
- The Burushaski Language, Vol. II: Histories. Aschehoug, Oslo 1935
- The Burushaski Language, Vol. II: Dictionary. 1938.
- The Dumki Language. 1939
- The Wakhi Language. 1958
- The papers of Lieutenant-Colonel Lockhart, primarily relating to his work on the Burushaski, Khowar, Shinaand Bakhtiari languages including photographs and film of field trips are held by SOAS Archives.
- The Lorimers' Bakhtiari documentation was published in F. Vahman and G. Asatrian, Poetry of the Baxtiārīs: Love Poems, Wedding Songs, Lullabies, Laments, Copenhagen, 1995.
