= Derek Scrimgour =

Scottish footballer

Personal information
- Date of birth: 29 March 1978 (age 48)
- Place of birth: Glasgow, Scotland
- Position: Goalkeeper

Youth career
- Johnstone Burgh

Senior career*
Years	Team	Apps	(Gls)
1994–2002	St Mirren	40	(0)
2000	→ Berwick Rangers (loan)	7	(0)
2002–2003	Dumbarton	0	(0)
2003–2005	Queen's Park	35	(0)
2004-2005	Renfrew	36	(0)

International career
1997–1998	Scotland U21	3	(0)
- * Club domestic league appearances and goals

Derek Scrimgour (born 29 March 1978) is a former professional footballer, who played for St Mirren in the 2000–01 Scottish Premier League.
