= George Huntly Lorimer =

American molecular biochemist

George Lorimer FRS
- Born: George Huntly Lorimer; October 14, 1942 (age 83)
- Education: George Watson's College
- Alma mater: University of St Andrews (BSc); University of Illinois (MS); Michigan State University (PhD)
- Awards: Humboldt Prize (1997)
- Scientific career
- Institutions: University of Maryland
- Thesis: The role of oxygen in photorespiration (1972)
- Website: www.chem.umd.edu/faculty-staff-directory/facultydirectory/george-lorimer

George Huntly Lorimer (born 1942) FRS is a professor in the Department of Chemistry and Biochemistry at the University of Maryland.

== Career and research ==
Lorimer is recognized for his work on mechanism of two proteins, RuBisCO and the GroE chaperonins. Rubisco is the enzyme responsible for photosynthetic carbon fixation, and the GroE chaperonins enable the Adenosine triphosphate (ATP)-dependent folding of many other proteins.

Using Oxygen-18 Lorimer demonstrated the oxygenase activity of RuBisCO, both in vivo and in vitro. He further established the novel mechanism for the activation of RuBisCO by carbon dioxide, the formation of a lysyl-carbamate in the active site. With his colleagues at DuPont he employed chemical quench and other techniques to trap and identify the 6-carbon reaction intermediate of the carboxylation reaction and defined the complete stereo-chemical course of the reaction.

In 1989, using an unequivocally unfolded protein and the purified chaperonin proteins GroEL and GroES, his group was the first to demonstrate the ATP-dependent folding of RuBisCO and many other proteins. With Devarajan (Dave) Thirumalai he performed a bioinformatic analysis to define the structural elements of the substrate proteins that GroEL recognizes. Lorimer has also shown that GroEL can perform work on substrate protein during allosteric transitions. He has determined the crystal structure of the functional form, the symmetric GroEL:GroES2 “football” and established that the GroEL rings operate as parallel-processing, iterative annealing machines.

=== Awards and honors ===
Lorimer is a member of the National Academy of Sciences of the United States and a Fellow of the Royal Society (FRS) of London. He was awarded the Humboldt Prize in 1997.
