= William Lorimer (scholar) =

Scottish classicist (1885–1967)

William Laughton Lorimer, FBA (1885–1967) was a Scottish scholar. Born at Strathmartine on the outskirts of Dundee, he was educated at the High School of Dundee, Fettes College, and Trinity College, Oxford. He is best known for the translation of the New Testament into Scots.

Lorimer spent his professional life as a scholar of Ancient Greek at various universities, ending his career as Professor of Greek at the University of St Andrews. However he also had a lifelong interest in the Scots language and besides the translation, was a longtime contributor to the Scottish National Dictionary. For the last ten years of his life he worked on translating the New Testament from the original Greek sources into Scots. Although he did not finish the final revision of his translation, the work was completed by his son Robin and published posthumously on his behalf in 1983.

He was also the literary executor of fellow classicist John Burnet (1863–1928).

== See also ==
Lorimer's siblings:

- Hilda Lorimer
- John Gordon Lorimer
- David Lockhart Robertson Lorimer
