= 2007–08 ICC Intercontinental Cup =

International cricket tournament

- Dates: 27 June 2007 – 2 November 2008
- Administrator(s): International Cricket Council
- Cricket format: First-class cricket
- Tournament format(s): Round-robin and final
- Champions: Ireland (3rd title)
- Runners-up: Namibia
- Participants: 8
- Matches: 29
- Most runs: (United Arab Emirates) Saqib Ali (690)
- Most wickets: (Namibia) Kola Burger (37)

The 2007–08 ICC Intercontinental Cup was the fourth ICC Intercontinental Cup tournament, an international first-class cricket tournament for nations who have not been awarded Test status by the International Cricket Council. The first fixtures were played in June 2007, and the final took place from 30 October to 2 November 2008 in Port Elizabeth, South Africa. The same eight countries as in the previous edition were participating. The eight teams played each other in a round robin format. Namibia won the round-robin, but lost the final against Ireland, making it Ireland's third consecutive title in this competition.

== Table ==
Team	Points	P	W	L	D	FI	A
Namibia	108	7	6	1	0	4	0
Ireland	106	7	5	0	2	5	0
Kenya	96	7	4	2	0	5	1
Scotland	82	7	3	1	2	4	1
Netherlands	48	7	3	4	0	1	0
Arab Emirates	29	7	1	5	1	2	0
Canada	29	7	1	5	1	2	0
Bermuda	26	7	1	6	0	2	0

- Win – 14 points
- Draw if more than 8 hours of play lost – 3 points (otherwise 0 points)
- First Innings leader – 6 points (independent of final result)
- Abandoned without a ball played – 10 points.

== Matches ==
=== 2007 season ===
27 – 30 June
Scorecard

Scotland	v	United Arab Emirates
		174/4 (48 overs); Khurram Khan 74 (171); Craig Wright 2/19 (16 overs)

Match drawn
Cambusdoon New Ground, Ayr, Scotland
Umpires: Paul Baldwin (Ger) and Norman Malcolm (WI)

- Scotland won the toss & elected to field
- No play on days 2, 3 and 4 due to rain
  Points: Scotland 3, UAE 3

28 June – 1 July
Scorecard

Canada	v	Netherlands
337/9d (93.4 overs); Sunil Dhaniram 73 (87); Mudassar Bukhari 3/61 (25 overs)		297 (78.3 overs); Alexei Kervezee 98 (142); Henry Osinde 4/47 (17 overs)
225 (70 overs); Qaiser Ali 53 (103); Mangesh Panchal 4/50 (11 overs)		310 (93.2 overs); Peter Borren 105 (176); Henry Osinde 3/68 (28 overs)

Netherlands won by 45 runs
Maple Leaf North-West Ground, King City, Canada
Umpires: Roger Dill (Ber) and Darrell Hair (Aus)
Player of the match: Peter Borren

- Canada won the toss & elected to field
- Points: Netherlands 14, Canada 6

7 – 10 July
Scorecard

Canada	v	United Arab Emirates
450 (123.3 overs); Sunil Dhaniram 141* (171); Zahid Shah 4/108 (30.3 overs)		112 (39.5 overs); Gayan Silva 36 (104); Steven Welsh 7/42 (17.5 overs)
		110 (41.3 overs); Shadeep Silva 43 (102); Steven Welsh 5/51 (20.3 overs)

Canada won by an innings and 228 runs
Maple Leaf North-West Ground, King City, Canada
Umpires: Roger Dill (Ber) and Courtney Young (Cay)
Player of the match: Steven Welsh

- United Arab Emirates won the toss & elected to bat
- Points: Canada 20, UAE 0

2 – 5 August
Scorecard

Scotland	v	Netherlands
452 (109.1 overs); Neil McCallum 181 (254); Mudassar Bukhari 3/70 (27.1 overs)		255 (88.5 overs); Tom de Grooth 98 (199); John Blain 5/84 (24 overs)
		138 (45.3 overs); Mudassar Bukhari 34 (46); Paul Hoffmann 3/33 (12 overs)

Scotland won by an innings and 59 runs
Mannofield Park, Aberdeen, Scotland
Umpires: Steve Bucknor (WI) and Charlie McElwee (Ire)

- Scotland won the toss & elected to field
- Points: Scotland 20, Netherlands 0

9 – 12 August
Scorecard

Ireland	v	Scotland
473/7 (110 overs); Andre Botha 186 (238); Craig Wright 3/93 (27 overs)		314 (148.4 overs); John Blain 93 (259); Kevin O'Brien 4/38 (19.4 overs)

Match drawn
Civil Service Cricket Club Ground, Stormont, Belfast, Northern Ireland
Umpires: Niels Bagh (Den) and Billy Doctrove (WI)

- Scotland won the toss & elected to bat
- No play on day 3.
  Points: Ireland 9, Scotland 3

13 – 16 August
Scorecard

Netherlands	v	Bermuda
410 (114.1 overs); Tom de Grooth 196 (299); George O'Brien 5/118 (32 overs)		183 (59 overs); Irving Romaine 103* (127); Mangesh Panchal 5/34 (11 overs)
		183 (57.2 overs); Dwayne Leverock 52 (114); Mangesh Panchal 3/44 (14 overs)

Netherlands won by an innings and 44 runs
VRA Ground, Amstelveen, Netherlands
Umpires: Charlie McElwee (IRE) and Ian Ramage (SCO)

- Netherlands won the toss & elected to field
- Points: Netherlands 20, Bermuda 0

23 – 26 August
Scorecard

Ireland	v	Bermuda
524/8d (133.5 overs); William Porterfield 166 (326); Dwayne Leverock 4/98 (30.5 overs)		192 (64 overs); Steven Outerbridge 53 (98); Trent Johnston 3/17 (11 overs)
		186 (f/o) (54.5 overs); Steven Outerbridge 50 (98); Dave Langford-Smith 5/45 (15 overs)

Ireland won by an innings and 146 runs
Clontarf Cricket Club Ground, Dublin, Ireland
Umpires: Niels Bagh (DEN) and Charlie McElwee (IRE)

- Bermuda won the toss & elected to field
- Points: Ireland 20, Bermuda 0

=== 2007–08 season ===
12 – 15 October
Scorecard

Kenya	v	Canada
393 (107.5 overs); Thomas Odoyo 103* (161); Umar Bhatti 5/75 (20.5 overs)		263 (88.2 overs); Sunil Dhaniram 78 (123); Jimmy Kamande 4/56 (24 overs)
105/1 (20.2 overs); Morris Ouma 71* (68); Qaiser Ali 1/13 (2.2 overs)		229 (73 overs); Arvind Kandappah 87 (111); Steve Tikolo 4/34 (16 overs)

Kenya won by 9 wickets
Gymkhana Club Ground, Nairobi, Kenya
Umpires: Marais Erasmus (SA) and Buddhi Pradhan (Nep)

- Canada won the toss & elected to bat
- Points: Kenya 20, Canada 0

25 – 28 October
Scorecard

Namibia	v	Canada
480/9d (138 overs); Bjorn Kotze 163* (345); Sunil Dhaniram 3/58 (28 overs)		286 (66.4 overs); Mohammad Iqbal 140 (195); Gerrie Snyman 4/63 (15.4 overs)
102/2 (20.1 overs); Jan-Berrie Burger 44* (68); Henry Osinde 1/51 (10 overs)		296 (fo) (90.3 overs); Mohammad Iqbal 88 (145); Louis Klazinga 4/55 (22 overs)

Namibia won by 8 wickets
Wanderers Cricket Ground, Windhoek, Namibia
Umpires: Brian Jerling (SA) and Russell Tiffin (Zim)

- Namibia won the toss & elected to bat
- Points: Namibia 20, Canada 0

1 – 4 November
Scorecard

Kenya	v	Bermuda
302 (96 overs); Thomas Odoyo 73 (151); Kevin Hurdle 4/98 (25 overs)		281 (96 overs); David Hemp 97 (227); Hiren Varaiya 5/56 (15 overs)
161/2 (37.3 overs); David Obuya 70 (107); Malachi Jones 1/22 (5 overs)		178 (59.3 overs); David Hemp 68* (166); Hiren Varaiya 5/75 (24.3 overs)

Kenya won by 8 wickets
Gymkhana Club Ground, Nairobi, Kenya
Umpires: Ian Howell (SA) and Buddhi Pradhan (Nep)

- Kenya won the toss & elected to field
- Points: Kenya 20, Bermuda 0

8 – 11 November
Scorecard

United Arab Emirates	v	Bermuda
143 (49.2 overs); Arshad Ali 18 (46); Kevin Hurdle 6/45 (21 overs)		311 (93.1 overs); David Hemp 174* (252); Shadeep Silva 3/53 (16 overs)
449 (142 overs); Arshad Ali 185 (323); Malachi Jones 4/84 (24 overs)		143 (39.2 overs); Irving Romaine 32 (40); Irfan Ahmed 3/35 (10 overs)

United Arab Emirates won by 138 runs
Sharjah Cricket Association Stadium, Sharjah, United Arab Emirates
Umpires: Billy Doctrove (WI) and Buddhi Pradhan (Nep)

- United Arab Emirates won the toss & elected to bat
- Points: UAE 14, Bermuda 6

23 – 26 January
Scorecard

United Arab Emirates	v	Namibia
224 (72.3 overs); Saqib Ali 104 (184); Louis Klazinga 3/43 (17 overs)		164 (44.3 overs); Jan-Berrie Burger 68 (85); Ahmed Raza 3/20 (5.3 overs)
296 (87.4 overs); Khurram Khan 97 (176); Jan-Berrie Burger 5/81 (24.4 overs)		396 (143.4 overs); Dawid Botha 104 (223); Khurram Khan 6/98 (42 overs)

Namibia won by 40 runs
Sharjah Cricket Association Stadium, Sharjah, United Arab Emirates
Umpires: Niels Bagh (Den) and Darrell Hair (Aus)
Player of the match: Jan-Berrie Burger

- Namibia won the toss & elected to bat
- Points: Namibia 14, UAE 6

29 January – 1 February
Scorecard

Kenya	v	Namibia
229 (66 overs); Collins Obuya 76* (175); Kola Burger 5/68 (25 overs)		183 (56.5 overs); Tobias Verwey 43* (43); Steve Tikolo 3/24 (5.5 overs)
135 (46.1 overs); David Obuya 19 (20); Kola Burger 4/37 (15 overs)		282 (76.5 overs); Gerrie Snyman 230 (201); Collins Obuya 3/34 (16.1 overs)

Namibia won by 101 runs
Sharjah Cricket Association Stadium, Sharjah, United Arab Emirates
Umpires: Niels Bagh (Den) and Darrell Hair (Aus)
Player of the match: Gerrie Snyman

- Kenya won the toss & elected to field
- Points: Namibia 14, Kenya 6

4 – 7 February
Scorecard

United Arab Emirates	v	Kenya
224 (90 overs); Amjad Ali 52 (122); Hiren Varaiya 5/50 (23 overs)		326 (117.3 overs); Thomas Odoyo 137 (272); Fahad Alhashmi 3/47 (17 overs)
192 (53.3 overs); Nizel Fernandes 63 (116); Peter Ongondo 5/30 (12 overs)		171 (73.2 overs); Jimmy Kamande 62* (160); Khurram Khan 4/26 (25.2 overs)

Kenya won by 81 runs
Sharjah Cricket Association Stadium, Sharjah, United Arab Emirates
Umpires: Paul Baldwin (Ger) and Russell Tiffin (Zim)
Player of the match: Thomas Odoyo

- Kenya won the toss & elected to bat
- Points: Kenya 20, UAE 0

6 – 9 March
Scorecard

United Arab Emirates	v	Ireland
228 (72 overs); Sameer Zia 56 (80); Alex Cusack 2/13 (7 overs)		474 (134.3 overs); Niall O'Brien 174 (293); Saqib Ali 3/84 (26.3 overs)
306 (122.2 overs); Saqib Ali 195 (358); Alex Cusack 3/19 (16.2 overs)		64/1 (14.2 overs); William Porterfield 40* (54); Sameer Zia 1/10 (2.2 overs)

Ireland won by 9 wickets
Sheikh Zayed Cricket Stadium, Abu Dhabi, United Arab Emirates
Umpires: Shahul Hameed (Indonesia) and Zameer Haider (Pak)
Player of the match: Saqib Ali

- United Arab Emirates won the toss & elected to bat
- Points: Ireland 20, United Arab Emirates 0

27 – 30 March
Scorecard

Namibia	v	Netherlands
337 (96 overs); Jan-Berrie Burger 81 (89); Edgar Schiferli 4/50 (24 overs)		107 (36 overs); Peter Borren 35 (52); Kola Burger 4/44 (15 overs)
94/3 (19.3 overs); Jan-Berrie Burger 46 (38); Mudassar Bukhari 2/24 (8 overs)		323 (91 overs)(fo); Ryan ten Doeschate 116 (169); Kola Burger 5/27 (13 overs)

Namibia won by 7 wickets
Wanderers Cricket Ground, Windhoek, Namibia
Umpires: Jeff Luck (Nam) and Russell Tiffin (Zim)

- Namibia won the toss & elected to bat
- Points: Namibia 20, Netherlands 0

=== 2008 season ===
3 – 6 April
Scorecard

United Arab Emirates	v	Netherlands
289 (96 overs); Saqib Ali 58 (73); Edgar Schiferli 5/48 (18 overs)		287 (91.1 overs); Bas Zuiderent 77 (169); Arshad Ali 5/43 (15.1 overs)
277 (85 overs); Mohammad Tauqir 64 (115); Edgar Schiferli 3/47 (19 overs)		343 (96.2 overs); Bas Zuiderent 149* (273); Arshad Ali 4/99 (25.2 overs)

Netherlands won by 64 runs
Sharjah Cricket Association Stadium, Sharjah, United Arab Emirates
Umpires: Enamul Haque (Ban) and Buddhi Pradhan (Nep)
Player of the match: Bas Zuiderent

- United Arab Emirates won the toss & elected to field
- Points: Netherlands 14, UAE 6

4 – 7 April
Scorecard

Namibia	v	Scotland
115 (32.5 overs); Bjorn Kotze 26 (41); John Blain 5/45 (12 overs)		140 (54.1 overs); John Blain 34 (76); Gerrie Snyman 4/40 (16 overs)
237/9 (92.3 overs); Sarel Burger 79 (162); John Blain 4/61 (25 overs)		211 (76.2 overs); Qasim Sheikh 63 (177); Kola Burger 6/62 (23 overs)

Namibia won by 1 wicket
Wanderers Cricket Ground, Windhoek, Namibia
Umpires: Jeff Luck (Nam) and Russell Tiffin (Zim)

- Scotland won the toss & elected to bat
- Points: Namibia 14, Scotland 6

4 – 7 July
Scorecard

Canada	v	Bermuda
228 (71.3 overs); Ian Billcliff 56 (114); Dwayne Leverock 5/69 (22 overs)		237 (87.4 overs); Steven Outerbridge 79 (194); Sunil Dhaniram 4/70 (34.4 overs)
151 (61.1 overs); Eion Katchay 29 (29); Dwayne Leverock 5/60 (27 overs)		248 (110.5 overs); Irving Romaine 84 (276); Sunil Dhaniram 4/36 (42.5 overs)

Bermuda won by 106 runs
Maple Leaf Cricket Club North-East Ground, King City, Ontario, Canada
Umpires: Gary Baxter (NZ) and Roger Dill (Ber)
Player of the match: Dwayne Leverock

- Bermuda won the toss & elected to bat
- Points: Bermuda 20, Canada 0

9 – 12 July
Scorecard

Netherlands	v	Ireland
127 (53.4 overs); Pieter Seelaar 27 (34); Peter Connell 4/41 (17 overs)		400/6d (99 overs); Andre Botha 172 (212); Mudassar Bukhari 4/85 (22 overs)
206(fo) (81 overs); Mudassar Bukhari 59 (95); Peter Connell 6/28 (18 overs)

Ireland won by an innings and 67 runs
Hazelaarweg, Rotterdam, The Netherlands
Umpires: Paul Baldwin (Ger) and Steve Davis (Aus)
Player of the match: Andre Botha

- Netherlands won the toss & elected to field
- Points: Ireland 20, Netherlands 0

10 – 13 July
Scorecard

Bermuda	v	Scotland
106 (53.2 overs); Chris Foggo 53 (72); Dewald Nel 4/27 (12.2 overs)		282 (109 overs); Fraser Watts 93 (224); Dwayne Leverock 6/120 (44 overs)
265 (102.4 overs); Steven Outerbridge 113 (250); Ross Lyons 4/55 (27.4 overs)		196/9d (53.3 overs); Fraser Watts 83 (126); George O'Brien 3/39 (12 overs)

Scotland won by 107 runs
National Stadium, Hamilton, Bermuda
Umpires: Roger Dill (Ber) and Shahul Hameed (Indonesia)

- Scotland won the toss & elected to bat
- Points: Scotland 20, Bermuda 0

16 – 19 July
Scorecard

Canada	v	Scotland
79 (38.2 overs); Sunil Dhaniram 17 (62); Dewald Nel 4/32 (10 overs)		374 (130.5 overs); Douglas Lockhart 151 (361); Sunil Dhaniram 4/61 (23 overs)
130(fo) (58.3 overs); Sandeep Jyoti 43 (132); Ross Lyons 4/36 (15 overs)

Scotland won by an innings and 165 runs
Maple Leaf Cricket Club North-East Ground, King City, Ontario, Canada
Umpires: Gary Baxter (NZ) and Shahul Hameed (Indonesia)
Player of the match: Douglas Lockhart

- Scotland won the toss & elected to bat
- Points: Scotland 20, Canada 0

7 – 10 August
Scorecard

Ireland	v	Canada
326/6d (88.0 overs); Andrew White 109 (144); Steven Welsh 2/89 (23 overs)		141/5 (53.0 overs); Sunil Dhaniram 70* (90); Peter Connell 2/34 (13 overs)

Match drawn
Malahide, Dublin, Ireland
Umpires: Charlie McElwee (Ire) and Sarika Prasad (Sng)

- Ireland won the toss & elected to bat
- No play on days 1&4 due to rain
  Points: Ireland 3, Canada 3

7 – 10 August
Scorecard

Scotland	v	Kenya

Match abandoned
Titwood, Glasgow, Scotland
Umpires: Paul Baldwin (Ger) and Simon Taufel (Aus)

- No play possible due to rain
  Points: Scotland 10, Kenya 10

16 – 19 August
Scorecard

Netherlands	v	Kenya
126 (43.2 overs); Nick Statham 29 (95); Thomas Odoyo 3/16 (7.2 overs)		253 (79 overs); Morris Ouma 114 (198); Pieter Seelaar 5/57 (23 overs)
121 (43.1 overs); Atse Buurman 41 (73); Peter Ongondo 5/13 (12 overs)

Kenya won by an innings and 6 runs
VRA Ground, Amstelveen, The Netherlands
Umpires: Niels Bagh (Den) and Mark Benson (Eng)
Player of the match: Morris Ouma

- Kenya won the toss & elected to field
- Points: Kenya 20, Netherlands 0

=== 2008–09 season ===
3 – 6 September
Scorecard

Bermuda	v	Namibia
175 (81 overs); Jekon Edness 39 (97); Deon Kotze 4/31 (27 overs)		320 (115.1 overs); Sarel Burger 86 (281); Dwayne Leverock 3/88 (38.1 overs)
195 (75.1 overs); Steven Outerbridge 78 (117); Jan-Berrie Burger 6/56 (20 overs)		153/9d (37 overs); Gerrie Snyman 57 (52); Stefan Kelly 4/53 (12 overs)

Namibia won by 103 runs
National Stadium, Hamilton, Bermuda
Umpires: Karran Bayney (Can) and Roger Dill (Ber)

- Namibia won the toss & elected to bat
- Points: Namibia 20, Bermuda 0

3 – 4 October
Scorecard

Namibia	v	Ireland
119 (28.3 overs); Bjorn Kotze 28 (38); Peter Connell 4/24 (7.3 overs)		69 (28.3 overs); Andrew White 19 (24); Louis Klazinga 4/11 (7.3 overs)
106 (28 overs); Gerrie Snyman 28 (14); Boyd Rankin 5/39 (12 overs)		164 (48.3 overs); Andre Botha 29 (28); Kola Burger 5/60 (18 overs)

Ireland won by 8 runs
Wanderers Cricket Ground, Windhoek, Namibia
Umpires: Kevan Barbour (Zim) and Russell Tiffin (Zim)

- Namibia won the toss & elected to field
- Points: Ireland 14, Namibia 6

11 – 14 October
Scorecard

Kenya	v	Ireland
186 (85.1 overs); Steve Tikolo 44 (103); Kyle McCallan 4/52 (22.1 overs)		578/4d (160.0 overs); Kevin O'Brien 171* (215); Hiren Varaiya 2/147 (45 overs)
327 (fo) (135.4 overs); Seren Waters 75 (163); Trent Johnson 4/43 (21 overs)

Ireland won by an innings and 65 runs
Gymkhana Club Ground, Nairobi, Kenya
Umpires: Marais Erasmus (SA) & Russell Tiffin (Zim)

- Points: Ireland 20, Kenya 0

== Final ==
30 October – 2 November
Scorecard

Namibia	v	Ireland
250 (94.3 overs); Louis Burger 74* (179); P Connel 5/54 (20.3 overs)		195 (73.3 overs); Alex Cusack 95* (231); G Snyman 5/53 (15 overs)
145 (62.3 overs); Jan-Berrie Burger 34 (128); B Rankin 4/39 (16.3 overs)		201/1 (58 overs); N O'Brien 119* (164); DB Koetze 1/47 (24 overs)

Ireland won by 9 wickets
St. George's Park, Port Elizabeth, South Africa
Umpires: Paul Baldwin (Germany) and Ian Howell (SA)
Player of the match: Alex Cusack

== Statistics and Records ==
Statistics and records for the 2007–08 Intercontinental Cup after the final.

Most runs

Player	Matches	Runs	Average
(United Arab Emirates) Saqib Ali	7	690	57.50
(Ireland) Andre Botha	8	643	80.37
(Namibia) Gerrie Snyman	8	603	43.07
(Ireland) Niall O'Brien	6	577	79.57
(Canada) Sunil Dhaniram	7	542	67.75

Most wickets

Player	Matches	Wickets	Average
(Namibia) Kola Burger	8	37	15.00
(Bermuda) Dwayne Leverock	7	34	27.17
(Kenya) Hiren Varaiya	6	30	19.80
(Ireland) Peter Connell	5	28	11.67
(Namibia) Louis Klazinga	8	27	19.55
