= 2006–07 ICC Intercontinental Cup =

International cricket tournament

- Dates: 23 March 2006 – 23 May 2007
- Administrator: International Cricket Council
- Cricket format: First-class cricket
- Tournament format(s): Round-robin and Final
- Champions: Ireland (2nd title)
- Runners-up: Canada
- Participants: 8
- Matches: 15
- Most runs: (Netherlands) Ryan ten Doeschate (686)
- Most wickets: (Ireland) Trent Johnston (26) (Canada) Umar Bhatti (26)

The 2006–07 ICC Intercontinental Cup was the third edition of the ICC Intercontinental Cup first-class cricket tournament, an international cricket tournament among nations who have not been awarded Test status by the International Cricket Council. Defending champions Ireland won the tournament after three wins and one drawn game, defeating Canada by an innings in the final, and stretched their streak of unbeaten matches in the Intercontinental Cup to eight.

The tournament lasted from 22 March 2006 to 23 May 2007. The number of participants was cut from 12 teams to eight following the 2005 edition, but the matches were lengthened from three to four days, and each team qualifying for the main stage played three games, instead of two in the 2005 and 2004 editions.

The eight teams played in two groups of four, with the winners of each group proceeding to the final which was played between Ireland and Canada at Grace Road in Leicester. The game was scheduled for 22 to 25 May 2007, but in the event Ireland won inside two days. All teams without Test status which qualified for the 2007 Cricket World Cup participated, along with the United Arab Emirates and the winner of the challenge match between Namibia and Nepal (runners-up in Africa and Asia in the 2005 edition).

== Participating teams ==
Europe

Ireland, Netherlands, Scotland

Africa

Kenya, Namibia

Asia

United Arab Emirates

North America

Bermuda, Canada

== Tournament organisation ==
Each team played the other three teams in a group once in a round-robin format; the winners of each group qualified for the final.

Points summary:.

- 14 points were awarded for a win
- 7 points were awarded to both teams for a tie
- 6 points were awarded for a first-innings lead
- 3 points were awarded to both teams if they were tied on first innings
- 3 points were awarded for a draw if more than eight hours were lost to weather conditions; else no points for a draw
- 10 points were awarded to both teams in the event of an abandoned match (equivalent to a tie + a first innings tie)

Matches lasted four days, with a minimum over rate of 16 per hour, i.e. 96 a day. If the scheduled minimum was not met by the end of the day, an extra half-hour of play was allowed. Otherwise, the normal rules of first-class cricket applied.

== Results ==
=== Challenge Match: Namibia v Nepal ===
23–26 March 2006
Scorecard

Namibia	v	Nepal
272 (116.2 overs); Deon Kotze 94 (270); Binod Das 6/80 (30.2 overs)		143 (75.4 overs); Paresh Lohani 34 (74); Gerrie Snyman 2/14 (13 overs)
239/6d (62 overs); Gerrie Snyman 78* (62); Binod Das 2/55 (19 overs)		70/3 (24 overs); Gyanendra Malla 16* (25); Jan-Berrie Burger 2/12 (7 overs)

Match drawn
Wanderers Cricket Ground, Windhoek
Umpires: Mike Gajjar (SA) and Russell Tiffin (Zim)

- Namibia won the toss and elected to field.
- Namibia qualified for the ICC Intercontinental Cup.

Namibia were put in to bat at the Wanderers Cricket Ground in Windhoek after the first day's play was lost to rain, and made 272 despite six wickets from Nepal's captain Binod Das. Deon Kotze and Gerrie Snyman shared the highest partnership with 97, and proceeded to bowl Nepal out for 143, with six bowlers getting at least one wicket. In Namibia's second innings, twelve sixes were hit, with Louis Burger and Snyman both getting half-centuries before Namibia declared on 239 for 6. Nepal batted out 24 overs to draw the match, but Namibia qualified nevertheless.

=== Group A ===
Team	Points	P	W	L	D	FI
Ireland	43	3	2	0	1	2
Scotland	35	3	1	0	2	3
Namibia	20	3	1	2	0	1
Arab Emirates	0	3	0	2	1	0

11–13 May 2006
Scorecard

Namibia	v	Scotland
168 (71.4 overs); Sarel Burger 69 (155); Ross Lyons 4/10 (12.4 overs)		360 (104 overs); Ryan Watson 167 (256); Deon Kotze 3/53 (21 overs)
127 (44.3 overs); Kola Burger 28 (12); Paul Hoffmann 5/14 (9 overs)

Scotland won by an innings and 65 runs
Mannofield Park, Aberdeen
Umpires: Niels Bagh (Den) and Charlie McElwee (Ire)

- Namibia won the toss and elected to bat.
- Dawid Botha, Henno Prinsloo, Louis van der Westhuizen (Nam), Neil McCallum and Ross Lyons (Sco) all made their first-class debuts.
- Points: Scotland 20, Namibia 0.

Namibia opened the group by playing two matches in Europe in May, the first against Scotland at Mannofield Park in Aberdeen. After winning the toss and choosing to bat, Namibia lost both openers to opposing captain Craig Wright, and after captain Deon Kotze went for a half-hour three, they were 73 for four. Sarel Burger (69) and Gerrie Snyman (41) put on 70 for the fifth wicket, but spinner Ross Lyons got both of them out to end with figures of four for 10 in the first innings, and Paul Hoffmann also got two wickets as Namibia were bowled out for 168. Scotland ended the first day on 95 for three, with Ryan Watson 62 not out. On a rain-shortened second day, with only 48.5 of the stipulated 104 overs bowled, Watson completed his maiden first-class century, with wicket-keeper Colin Smith contributing 70 in a stand of 177. Smith was out shortly before the close of play, and when Neil McCallum and Watson fell early on the third day, Scotland had slipped to 279 for six. However, a partnership of 68 for the seventh wicket between Wright (40) and Dewald Nel (25) helped take Scotland to 360, giving them a first-innings lead of 192. Hoffmann then single-handedly reduced Namibia to 35 for five, finishing the match with figures of seven wickets for 32 runs, and though the lower order briefly resisted, Scotland still completed an innings victory inside three days.

17–20 May 2006
Scorecard

Namibia	v	Ireland
95 (32.5 overs); Kola Burger 39 (20); Trent Johnston 6/23 (9.5 overs)		173 (65.5 overs); Trent Johnston 71 (121); Ian van Zyl 8/34 (19.5 overs)
131 (48 overs); Kola Burger 48 (32); Dave Langford-Smith 4/22 (14 overs)		56/5 (22.5 overs); Eoin Morgan 21 (47); Kola Burger 3/22 (9 overs)

Ireland won by 5 wickets
Clontarf Cricket Club Ground, Dublin
Umpires: Vic Hadcroft (Sco) and John Thallon (Sco)

- Ireland won the toss and elected to field.
- Dave Langford-Smith and William Porterfield (Ire) both made their first-class debuts.
- Points: Ireland 20, Namibia 0.

The following week, Namibia became the first team to be eliminated from the tournament final after their defeat in Dublin. Despite a better effort from the bowlers, who took fifteen wickets (of which Ian van Zyl took nine) for fewer runs than they had conceded in Scotland, Namibia totalled 226 runs – 87 of them coming from No. 9 Kola Burger. The first day's play was called off due to rain, but on the second day Ireland bowled out Namibia for 95, with captain Trent Johnston taking six for 23. Ian van Zyl responded in kind on the following day, taking eight for 34, but Johnston's 71 helped his side from 87 for seven to a total of 173. Namibia then fell to 22 for six, still trailing by 56 runs, but with the help of 48 from Kola Burger they set a target of 54 to win, and Burger then took three wickets as Ireland lost their first four for 25. However, after 21 from Eoin Morgan, Ireland made it to the target with the loss of just one further wicket.

17–20 August 2006
Scorecard

Scotland	v	Ireland
265 (79.2 overs); Ryan Watson 74 (111); Dave Langford-Smith 5/65 (20 overs)		174 (65.2 overs); William Porterfield 48 (129); Dougie Brown 5/37 (19.2 overs)
24/4 (12 overs); Neil MacRae 10 (22); Trent Johnston 3/12 (6 overs)

Match drawn
Mannofield Park, Aberdeen
Umpires: Niels Bagh (Den) and Shahul Hameed (Indonesia)

- Ireland won the toss and elected to field.
- Points: Scotland 9, Ireland 3.

This match, held a week after the European Championship which Ireland won, saw Scotland win the toss and bat at Mannofield Park. Dave Langford-Smith took his first five-wicket haul in first-class cricket, as Scotland were all out for 265. Langford-Smith took the first three wickets as Scotland fell to 58 for four, before Ryan Watson (74) built a stand of 66 with Neil McCallum, the highest of the game; John Blain then made 53 before being last out.

In reply, Ireland reached 129 for two, before losing their last eight wickets for 45 runs as Dougie Brown took a five-wicket haul of his own. However, they reduced Scotland to 24 for four before the second day's close, with captain Trent Johnston taking three of the wickets; they were denied a fifth wicket when Danish umpire Niels Bagh turned down a loud appeal for an edge by McCallum.

Overnight rain then seeped in under the covers, resulting in a damp pitch, and the third day's play was called off. Irish wicket-keeper Niall O'Brien reacted by having words with the Aberdeen groundsman, and a formal report was submitted on the incident. Despite no more rain falling during the hours of play, the fourth day was also called off, and the match declared a draw with Scotland gaining nine points and Ireland three.

8–11 December 2006
Scorecard

United Arab Emirates	v	Namibia
96 (38 overs); Ali Asad 24 (50); Louis Klazinga 3/12 (9 overs)		428 (102.1 overs); Louis Burger 120 (186); Wasim Bari 5/130 (20 overs)
183 (38 overs); Kashif Khan 95 (67); Louis Klazinga 5/20 (7 overs)

Namibia won by an innings and 149 runs
Wanderers Cricket Ground, Windhoek
Umpires: Russell Tiffin (Zim) and Laurance Willemse (SA)

- Namibia won the toss and elected to field.
- Points: Namibia 20, United Arab Emirates 0.

31 January – 3 February 2007
Scorecard

United Arab Emirates	v	Scotland
348 (129.3 overs); Saqib Ali 131 (309); John Blain 4/77 (22 overs)		373 (114.3 overs); Neil McCallum 109 (178); Ahmed Nadeem 5/84 (30.3 overs)
356/8d (83.1 overs); Gayan Silva 87 (143); Glenn Rogers 4/72 (22.1 overs)		137/6 (45.3 overs); Paul Hoffmann 48 (32); Ahmed Nadeem 3/40 (11 overs)

Match drawn
Sharjah Cricket Association Stadium, Sharjah
Umpires: Ian Gould (Eng) and Buddhi Pradhan (Nep)

- United Arab Emirates won the toss and elected to bat.
- Points: Scotland 6, United Arab Emirates 0.

9–12 February 2007
Scorecard

Ireland	v	United Arab Emirates
531/5d (111.2 overs); Eoin Morgan 209* (238); Khurram Khan 2/60 (15.2 overs)		243 (83.3 overs); Arshad Ali 75 (108); Trent Johnston 3/53 (19.3 overs)
		118 (48 overs) (f/o); Khurram Khan 42 (112); Boyd Rankin 4/56 (16 overs)

Ireland won by an innings and 170 runs
Sheikh Zayed Cricket Stadium, Abu Dhabi
Umpires: Shahul Hameed (Indonesia) and Tyron Wijewardene (SL)
Player of the match: Eoin Morgan (Ire)

- Ireland won the toss and elected to bat.
- Points: Ireland 20, United Arab Emirates 0.

=== Group B ===
Team	Pts	P	W	L	D	FI
Canada	40	3	2	1	0	2
Netherlands	26	3	1	0	2	2
Kenya	9	3	0	1	2	1
Bermuda	9	3	0	1	2	1

29 March – 1 April 2006
Scorecard

Netherlands	v	Kenya
474 (134.5 overs); Ryan ten Doeschate 158 (237); Ashish Karia 2/34 (6 overs)		367 (135.1 overs); Steve Tikolo 212* (380); Daan van Bunge 3/51 (19.1 overs)
202/5 (79 overs); Daan van Bunge 70* (176); Rajesh Bhudia 1/5 (8 overs)

Match drawn
Gymkhana Club Ground, Nairobi
Umpires: Niels Bagh (Den) and Paul Baldwin (Ger)
Player of the match: Steve Tikolo (Ken)

- Netherlands won the toss and elected to bat.
- Points: Netherlands 6, Kenya 0.

Kenya and the Netherlands opened the group stages in Nairobi. Kenya had come off losing all four ODIs in their series against Bangladesh, and had dropped five players, including wicketkeeper Kennedy Otieno who had played 71 ODIs and 29 first-class games for Morris Ouma, following Otieno's total of eight runs on the Bangladesh tour. Otieno vowed to quit international cricket as a result. For the Netherlands, Pieter Seelaar and Billy Stelling were unavailable, while Bas Zuiderent recovered from a stomach upset to open the batting and make 26 after Dutch captain Luuk van Troost won the toss at Nairobi Gymkhana and chose to bat. Three more players passed 25 on the first day; Ryan ten Doeschate spent five hours at the crease and made 158, described as "faultless" by CricketEurope correspondent Rod Lyall, while Daan van Bunge added 32 and captain van Troost was unbeaten on 29. First-class debutant Ashish Karia got the best figures on the first day, with two for 18, but Lyall claimed Peter Ongondo was the pick of the bowlers. Hitesh Modi broke his finger when attempting to catch Tim de Leede, and according to Lyall, he was "unlikely to take any further part in the match".

Netherlands made more runs on the second day, with van Troost and Edgar Schiferli sharing an Intercontinental Cup record ninth-wicket partnership worth 95. During the partnership, the Dutch also surpassed the previous highest Intercontinental Cup total, of 444 for 4 between Ireland and UAE. They were eventually bowled out for 474, Schiferli hitting to Collins Obuya for 69, and Kenya got a chance to bat shortly before tea. They faced 52 second-day overs, with five batsmen making it into double figures, but only captain Steve Tikolo could convert it into a score past 25, as the Dutch snared five wickets. Darron Reekers got the best bowling figures, with two for 28. Reekers failed to take any wickets on the third day, however, when Kenya fought back – they scored 197 runs on that day, for the loss of four wickets (compared to 135 for 5 on the first), with Peter Ongondo lasting two and a half hours in a 123-run eighth-wicket stand with Tikolo. Netherlands then got two wickets in successive overs, and Kenya were 315 for 9, nine short of the follow on with the injured Modi still in the pavilion. He stepped out with one arm in a strap, batting one-handed to see out the day as Kenya totalled 332 for 9.

Modi and Tikolo put on 35 more before Modi was out to van Bunge, who thus ended with the best bowling figures for the Netherlands, with his three for 51, while Tikolo was not out on 212, his second double century in the Intercontinental Cup. It left the Netherlands with a lead of 107, and as they did not want to give Kenya the 14 points available for the win, they batted out the day for a draw. Van Bunge ended unbeaten on 70, while five Kenyan bowlers got a wicket each, and when stumps were drawn on the final day Netherlands were 202 for 5.

29 July – 1 August 2006
Scorecard

Canada	v	Kenya
235 (73.3 overs); Qaiser Ali 91* (160); Peter Ongondo 4/49 (19 overs)		231 (87.2 overs); Tanmay Mishra 83* (168); Henry Osinde 4/51 (26 overs)
286 (79.5 overs); Geoff Barnett 136 (212); Nehemiah Odhiambo 5/54 (15.5 overs)		265 (103.1 overs); Collins Obuya 89 (187); Umar Bhatti 6/65 (24.1 overs)

Canada won by 25 runs
Maple Leaf North-West Ground, King City, Ontario
Umpires: Roger Dill (Ber) and Courtney Young (Cayman Islands)
Player of the match: Geoff Barnett (Can) and Umar Bhatti (Can)

- Canada won the toss and elected to bat.
- Points: Canada 20, Kenya 0.

Kenya's next match was against Canada in Toronto, in what became a "tense" match. Canada opted to bat first on a "green and...underprepared pitch", and were 102 for seven after seamers Peter Ongondo, Thomas Odoyo and Nehemiah Odhiambo had shared out the opening seven wickets. Qaiser Ali fought back with a first-class best of 91 not out, however, eventually running out of batting partners as Ongondo, Steve Tikolo and debutant Hiren Varaiya, a slow left arm bowler, took the final wickets. However, Kenya lost their first four wickets for 14 runs in the poor light (which caused play to end 20 minutes early), with both openers out without having made a run. Henry Osinde and Umar Bhatti caused the damage, with two wickets each.

On the second day, Tanmay Mishra nearly emulated Ali; he also made an unbeaten half-century from number seven, but ran out of partners six runs short of Ali's tally. After a 41-run tenth-wicket stand, Varaiya was caught by Pubudu Dassanayake to leave Kenya four short of Canada's total, which gave the hosts six points for the first innings lead.

Canada closed the second day on 52 for one, with captain John Davison out caught. Early on the third day, nightwatchman Bhatti was out for 6. Opener Geoff Barnett – who had made 11 first-class appearances for Central Districts Stags in New Zealand without scoring a century – then reached 136, putting on 86 with Stewart Heaney (12) and 112 with Ashish Bagai (57). However, his dismissal – bowled by first-class debutant Odhiambo – sparked a collapse, as Canada lost their last seven wickets for 26 runs. Odhiambo claimed four more wickets to complete a five-wicket haul on debut.

Kenya were left needing 291 for victory, but lost two wickets before the end of the third day: recalled opener Kennedy Otieno completed a pair of ducks, and Brijal Patel was caught behind for 9. There was also a rejected stumping appeal against Tikolo.

The final day's play "ebbed and flowed throughout". First, Tikolo and Tony Suji took their third-wicket stand to 75 before Tikolo was bowled by Davison for 50, and Suji was caught for 33. Hitesh Modi (41) and Collins Obuya then added 59 before Modi was caught and bowled by 42-year-old spinner Puvendran Ravishankar, who then took the wicket of Mishra. With 102 required and four wickets in hand, Bhatti returned to bowl, and had Odoyo and Odhiambo caught within three minutes. Obuya now had two batting partners remaining: Ongondo lasted for 40 minutes without scoring a single run, and Varaiya lasted a similar length of time. Obuya had taken his score to a first-class best 89, and Kenya to within 26 runs of victory, when he was caught at slip by Barnett, giving Bhatti his sixth wicket of the innings and tenth of the match. Barnett and Bhatti shared the Man of the Match award.

12–15 August 2006
Scorecard

Bermuda	v	Canada
334 (96.4 overs); Janeiro Tucker 71 (121); Umar Bhatti 4/91 (28 overs)		588 (135.4 overs); John Davison 165 (175); Ryan Steede 4/127 (24 overs)
310 (102.5 overs); Clay Smith 84 (225); Umar Bhatti 6/104 (28.5 overs)		60/1 (12.2 overs); Geoff Barnett 33* (35); Saleem Mukuddem 1/29 (6 overs)

Canada won by 9 wickets
Maple Leaf North-West Ground, King City, Ontario
Umpires: Norman Malcolm (WI) and Hubert Smythe (Cayman Islands)
Player of the match: Umar Bhatti (Can)

- Canada won the toss and elected to field.
- Points: Canada 20, Bermuda 0.

Umar Bhatti took his second successive ten-wicket haul, helping Canada to a nine-wicket win against Bermuda. In the highest-scoring match of the tournament, with 1292 runs for 31 wickets, Canada prevailed to further extend their lead in the group, putting Kenya out of the tournament.

Bermuda batted first, and lost both openers for single-figure scores, but Clay Smith put on 99 with Irving Romaine before both were caught behind with the score stuck on 120. Dean Minors was also caught for a single-figure score, Bhatti's fourth wicket, but after that he could not take any further wickets, and Janeiro Tucker and Saleem Mukuddem made their way towards half-centuries, sharing a stand of 83 for the sixth wicket. John Davison eventually had Mukuddem out, and also Lionel Cann, two runs before he could reach his 50, and Henry Osinde took the final wicket to bowl Bermuda out for 334.

In response, Canada piled on hundreds. Davison made 165 opening the innings, leading Canada to 286 for three when he was dismissed, and sharing a stand of 230 with Ian Billcliff who went on to total 126. Ryan Steede grabbed four wickets, including Billcliff bowled, but could not stop the eighth-wicket stand between Abdool Samad (119) and Umar Bhatti (50). The two scored 149 for the eighth wicket, increasing Canada's first innings lead past 200, while Bermuda's spinner Dwayne Leverock had to bowl nearly 49 overs for two wickets, Bhatti and the No. 11 Ravishankar.

Bermuda closed the third day on 68 for one, with opener Steven Outerbridge on 35 not out. He added nine before he was caught by a substitute fielder, but Romaine, his batting partner, went on to make 65 before falling to the same fate. Clay Smith kept batting for the draw, but was seventh out to Davison, while Bhatti picked up six wickets for 104 to complete his second ten-wicket haul in a month.

5–8 November 2006
Scorecard

Bermuda	v	Kenya
133 (59 overs); Dean Minors 28 (68); Thomas Odoyo 5/21 (11 overs)		205 (56.1 overs); Steve Tikolo 66 (93); Saleem Mukuddem 6/50 (14 overs)
19/2 (16.3 overs); Steven Outerbridge 14 (44); Hiren Varaiya 2/1 (2 overs)

Match drawn
Gymkhana Club Ground, Nairobi
Umpires: Tony Hill (NZ) and Buddhi Pradhan (Nep)

- Bermuda won the toss and elected to bat.
- Days 3 and 4 were abandoned due to rain.
- Points: Kenya 9, Bermuda 3.

The match closed with two days of rain, though Bermuda had already lost their chance to qualify for the semi-finals early on the second day, after being bowled out for 133 and Kenya surpassed that score for the loss of three wickets. Thomas Odoyo took five wickets for Kenya in the first innings, and though Saleem Mukuddem responded with three on the first day and three on the second, Kenya made it to 205 all out after 66 from Steve Tikolo and 54 from Tanmay Mishra. After batting through 15 overs for no loss, Bermuda lost two wickets in an over to Hiren Varaiya and were 19 for two when bad conditions stopped play on the second day. The players could not return, and the game was called off as a draw.

21–24 November 2006
Scorecard

Netherlands	v	Bermuda
378 (129.1 overs); Ryan ten Doeschate 138 (196); Rodney Trott 3/47 (18.1 overs)		620 (196 overs); David Hemp 247* (373); Daan van Bunge 3/109 (37 overs)
170/2 (43 overs); Ryan ten Doeschate 100 (120); Irving Romaine 1/14 (7 overs)

Match drawn
LC de Villiers Oval, Pretoria
Umpires: Karl Hurter (SA) and Zed Ndamane (SA)

- Netherlands won the toss and elected to bat.
- Points: Bermuda 6, Netherlands 0.

5–8 December 2006
Scorecard

Canada	v	Netherlands
103 (36.2 overs); Qaiser Ali 34 (63); Ryan ten Doeschate 6/20 (12.2 overs)		409 (101.3 overs); Ryan ten Doeschate 259* (314); Sunil Dhaniram 3/58 (22 overs)
485 (111.1 overs); Qaiser Ali 174 (197); Daan van Bunge 4/163 (33.1 overs)		181/3 (39.3 overs); Tom de Grooth 82 (113); Sandeep Jyoti 2/46 (9 overs)

Netherlands won by 7 wickets
Sinovich Park, Sinoville, Pretoria
Umpires: Adriaan Crafford (SA) & Subhash Modi (Ken)

- Canada won the toss and elected to bat.
- Points: Netherlands 20, Canada 0.

=== Final ===
22–23 May 2007
Scorecard

Canada	v	Ireland
92 (31.4 overs); Abdool Samad 29 (48); Trent Johnston 4/12 (9.4 overs)		352 (94.4 overs); Jeremy Bray 146 (152); Umar Bhatti 5/85 (22.4 overs)
145 (36.5 overs); Asif Mulla 48 (55); Kyle McCallan 5/34 (8.5 overs)

Ireland won by an innings and 115 runs
Grace Road, Leicester, England
Umpires: Paul Baldwin (Ger) and Richard Kettleborough (Eng)
Player of the match: Jeremy Bray (Ire)

- Ireland won the toss and elected to field.
