= 2007 Cricket World Cup squads =

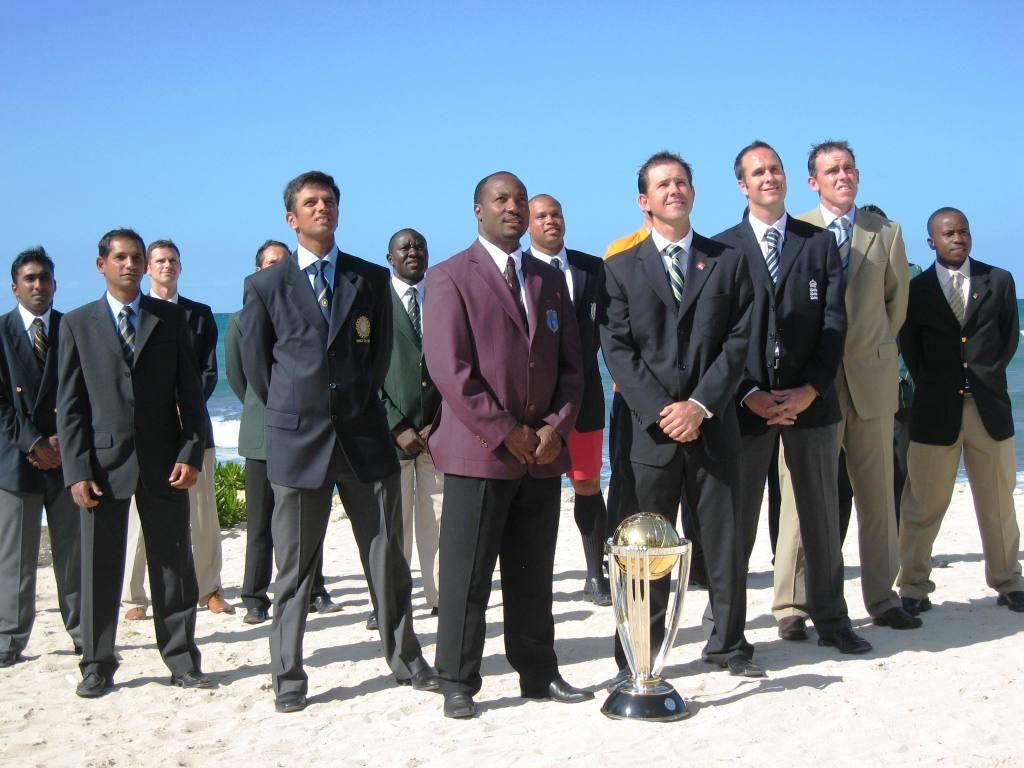
The captains of the 2007 Cricket World Cup.

This is a list of the squads picked for the 2007 Cricket World Cup. This was the ninth Cricket World Cup tournament and was held between 14 March and 28 April 2007. The sixteen teams asked to announce their final squads by 13 February 2007. Changes were allowed after this deadline at the discretion of the ICCs Technical Committee in necessary cases, such as due to player injury. In order to aid the teams to select the final 15, teams were given the option to announce a 30-man squad by mid-January, with the understanding that the final squad would be picked from these 30 players. However, this was not strictly adhered to – several of England's final 15 came from outside the initial 30, for example. The oldest player at the 2007 Cricket World Cup was Anderson Cummins (40) of Canada while the youngest was Alexei Kervezee of the Netherlands.

== Group A ==
=== Australia ===
Australia named their 15-man squad on 13 February 2007. On 23 February 2007, Brett Lee was removed from the squad due to injury and was replaced by Stuart Clark.

Coach: John Buchanan

No.	Player	Date of birth	ODIs	Batting	Bowling style	First-class team
14	Ricky Ponting (c)	19 December 1974 (Age 32)	268	Right-handed	Right-arm medium	Tasmanian Tigers
59	Nathan Bracken	12 September 1977 (Age 29)	57	Right-handed	Left-arm fast medium	New South Wales Blues
8	Stuart Clark	28 September 1975 (Age 31)	24	Right-handed	Right-arm fast medium	New South Wales Blues
23	Michael Clarke	2 April 1981 (Age 25)	101	Right-handed	Slow left-arm orthodox	New South Wales Blues
18	Adam Gilchrist	14 November 1971 (Age 35)	256	Left-handed	Wicket-keeper	Western Warriors
57	Brad Haddin	23 October 1977 (Age 29)	21	Right-handed	Wicket-keeper	New South Wales Blues
28	Matthew Hayden	29 October 1971 (Age 35)	133	Left-handed	Right-arm medium	Queensland Bulls
17	Brad Hodge	29 December 1974 (Age 32)	13	Right-handed	Right-arm off break	Victorian Bushrangers
31	Brad Hogg	6 February 1971 (Age 36)	95	Left-handed	Slow left-arm wrist-spin	Western Warriors
48	Michael Hussey	27 May 1975 (Age 31)	61	Left-handed	Right-arm medium	Western Warriors
25	Mitchell Johnson	2 November 1981 (Age 25)	18	Left-handed	Left-arm fast	Queensland Bulls
11	Glenn McGrath	9 February 1970 (Age 37)	238	Right-handed	Right-arm fast medium	New South Wales Blues
63	Andrew Symonds	9 June 1975 (Age 31)	161	Right-handed	Right-arm medium/off break	Queensland Bulls
32	Shaun Tait	22 February 1983 (Age 23)	4	Right-handed	Right-arm fast	Southern Redbacks
33	Shane Watson	17 June 1981 (Age 25)	57	Right-handed	Right-arm fast medium	Queensland Bulls

=== Netherlands ===
The KNCB named their 15-man squad on 13 February 2007. The squad was unchanged from that named for the World Cricket League Division One event in January 2007.

Coach: Peter Cantrell

No.	Player	Date of birth	ODIs	Batting	Bowling style	Domestic team
69	Luuk van Troost (c)	28 December 1969	21	Left-handed	Left-arm medium	Excelsior'20
17	Peter Borren	21 August 1983	10	Right-handed	Right-arm medium	VRA Amsterdam
19	Daan van Bunge	19 October 1982	21	Right-handed	Right-arm leg break	Excelsior'20
22	Ryan ten Doeschate	30 June 1980	11	Right-handed	Right-arm medium fast	Essex Eagles
20	Mark Jonkman	20 March 1986	4	Right-handed	Right-arm medium fast	HCC Den Haag
74	Mohammad Kashif	3 December 1984	6	Right-handed	Slow left-arm orthodox	VOC Rotterdam
85	Alexei Kervezee	11 September 1989	10	Right-handed	Right-arm medium	Worcestershire Royals
5	Tim de Leede	25 January 1968	26	Right-handed	Right-arm medium	Voorburg CC
4	Adeel Raja	15 August 1980	7	Right-handed	Right-arm off break	VRA Amsterdam
16	Darron Reekers	26 May 1973	9	Right-handed	Right-arm medium	Quick Den Haag
9	Edgar Schiferli	17 May 1976	13	Right-handed	Right-arm medium fast	Quick Den Haag
10	Jeroen Smits	21 June 1972	19	Right-handed	Wicket-keeper	HCC Den Haag
59	Billy Stelling	30 June 1969	9	Right-handed	Right-arm fast medium	HBS Craeyenhout
13	Eric Szwarczynski	13 February 1983	4	Right-handed	Right-arm medium	VRA Amsterdam
33	Bastiaan Zuiderent	3 March 1977	26	Right-handed	Right-arm medium	VOC Rotterdam

=== Scotland ===
Scotland named their squad in August 2006, to assist the players in arranging work and training schedules. However, Glenn Rogers later came in for Omer Hussain. Of the Scotland 15, Gavin Hamilton and John Blain have previous World Cup experience.

Coach: Peter Drinnen

No.	Player	Date of birth	ODIs	Batting	Bowling style	Domestic team
99	Craig Wright (c)	28 April 1974	13	Right-handed	Right-arm medium	Greenock
4	John Blain	4 January 1979	18	Left-handed	Right-arm fast medium	Yorkshire Phoenix
23	Dougie Brown	29 October 1969	13	Right-handed	Right-arm fast medium	Warwickshire Bears
37	Gavin Hamilton	16 September 1974	18	Left-handed	Right-arm medium fast	Scottish Saltires
10	Majid Haq	11 February 1983	10	Left-handed	Right-arm off break	Ferguslie
34	Paul Hoffmann	14 January 1970	12	Right-handed	Right-arm medium fast	Uddingston
21	Dougie Lockhart	19 January 1976	4	Right-handed	Right-arm medium	West of Scotland
8	Ross Lyons	8 December 1984	13	Left-handed	Slow left-arm orthodox	Clydesdale
25	Neil McCallum	22 November 1977	14	Right-handed		Grange
17	Dewald Nel	6 June 1980	5	Right-handed	Right-arm medium fast	Greenock
28	Navdeep Poonia	11 May 1986	8	Right-handed	Right-arm medium fast	Warwickshire Bears
18	Glenn Rogers	12 April 1977	4	Right-handed	Slow left-arm orthodox	Stenhousemuir
55	Colin Smith	27 September 1972	11	Right-handed	Wicket-keeper	Aberdeenshire
27	Ryan Watson	12 November 1976	14	Right-handed	Right-arm medium fast	Forfarshire
12	Fraser Watts	5 June 1979	12	Right-handed		Greenock

=== South Africa ===
South Africa named their 15-man squad on 15 February.

Coach: Mickey Arthur

No.	Player	Date of birth	ODIs	Batting	Bowling style	First-class team
15	Graeme Smith (c)	1 February 1981	103	Left-handed	Right-arm off break	Cape Cobras
14	Loots Bosman	14 April 1977	8	Right-handed	Right-arm medium	Eagles
9	Mark Boucher	3 December 1976	231	Right-handed	Wicket-keeper	Warriors
17	AB de Villiers	17 February 1984	29	Right-handed	Right-arm medium Wicket-keeper	Titans
07	Herschelle Gibbs	23 February 1974	198	Right-handed	Right-arm medium	Cape Cobras
99	Andrew Hall	31 July 1975	76	Right-handed	Right-arm fast medium	Dolphins; Kent Spitfires
3	Jacques Kallis	16 October 1975	242	Right-handed	Right-arm fast medium	Cape Cobras
6	Justin Kemp	2 October 1977	66	Right-handed	Right-arm fast medium	Titans; Kent Spitfires
67	Charl Langeveldt	17 December 1974	38	Right-handed	Right-arm fast medium	Lions
89	André Nel	15 July 1977	56	Right-handed	Right-arm fast medium	Titans
16	Makhaya Ntini	6 July 1977	143	Right-handed	Right-arm fast	Warriors
13	Robin Peterson	4 August 1979	33	Left-handed	Slow left-arm orthodox	Warriors
7	Shaun Pollock	16 July 1973	268	Right-handed	Right-arm fast medium	Dolphins
50	Ashwell Prince	28 May 1977	40	Left-handed	Left-arm slow	Cape Cobras
37	Roger Telemachus	27 March 1973	37	Right-handed	Right-arm fast medium	Eagles

== Group B ==
=== Bangladesh ===
Bangladesh named their 15-man squad on 13 February. Farhad Reza was brought in for Tapash Baisya on 7 April.

Coach: Dav Whatmore

No.	Player	Date of birth	ODIs	Batting	Bowling style	First-class team
7	Habibul Bashar (c)	17 August 1972	100	Right-handed	Right-arm off break	Khulna
41	Abdur Razzak	15 June 1982	38	Right-handed	Slow left-arm orthodox	Khulna
97	Aftab Ahmed	10 November 1985	55	Right-handed	Right-arm medium	Chittagong
76	Farhad Reza	16 June 1986	12	Right-handed	Right-arm fast medium	Rajshahi
5	Javed Omar	25 November 1976	53	Right-handed	Right-arm leg break	Dhaka
2	Mashrafe Mortaza	5 October 1983	56	Right-handed	Right-arm fast medium	Khulna
98	Mohammad Ashraful	9 September 1984	88	Right-handed	Right-arm leg break	Dhaka
77	Mohammad Rafique	5 September 1970	112	Left-handed	Slow left-arm orthodox	Dhaka
15	Mushfiqur Rahim	1 September 1988	11	Right-handed	Wicket-keeper	Rajshahi
35	Rajin Saleh	20 November 1983	43	Right-handed	Right-arm off break	Sylhet
75	Shakib Al Hasan	24 March 1987	20	Left-handed	Slow left-arm orthodox	Khulna
59	Shahadat Hossain	7 August 1986	20	Right-handed	Right-arm fast medium	Dhaka
42	Shahriar Nafees	25 January 1986	41	Left-handed		Barisal
47	Syed Rasel	3 July 1984	19	Left-handed	Left-arm medium fast	Khulna
29	Tamim Iqbal	20 March 1989	4	Left-handed		Chittagong
19	Tapash Baisya	25 December 1982	55	Right-handed	Right-arm fast medium	Sylhet

=== Bermuda ===
Bermuda announced their 15-man squad on 13 February 2007.

Coach: Gus Logie

No.	Player	Date of birth	ODIs	Batting	Bowling style	Domestic team
21	Irving Romaine (c)	8 August 1972	19	Right-handed	Right-arm off break	Baileys Bay
29	Delyone Borden	4 March 1985	7	Right	Right-arm off break	St. David's
32	Lionel Cann	3 October 1972	14	Right-handed	Right-arm medium	Southampton Rangers
4	David Hemp	8 November 1970	14	Left-handed	Right-arm medium	Glamorgan Dragons
26	Kevin Hurdle	30 December 1976	14	Right-handed	Right-arm fast	Young Men's Social Club
28	Malachi Jones	26 June 1989	8	Right-handed	Right-arm medium fast	Southampton Rangers
35	Stefan Kelly	24 August 1988	6	Right-handed	Right-arm fast medium	St. David's
99	Dwayne Leverock	14 July 1971	17	Right-handed	Slow left-arm orthodox	Southampton Rangers
30	Dean Minors	6 January 1970	17	Left-handed	Wicket-keeper	Flatts Victoria
20	Saleem Mukuddem	20 January 1972	18	Right-handed	Right-arm medium	Western Stars
31	Steven Outerbridge	20 May 1983	8	Right-handed	Right-arm off break	Baileys Bay
33	Oliver Pitcher	27 May 1983	2	Right-handed	Right-arm medium	St. David's
11	Clay Smith	15 January 1971	11	Right-handed	Right-arm off break	Cleveland County
22	Janeiro Tucker	15 March 1975	18	Right-handed	Right-arm medium	Southampton Rangers
23	Kwame Tucker	28 September 1976	12	Right-handed	Wicket-keeper	Southampton Rangers

=== India ===
India announced their final 15-man squad on 12 February 2007.

Coach: Greg Chappell

No.	Player	Date of birth	ODIs	Batting	Bowling style	First-class team
19	Rahul Dravid (c)	11 January 1973	306	Right-handed	Right-arm off break	Karnataka
10	Sachin Tendulkar	24 April 1973	381	Right-handed	Right-arm leg break	Mumbai
21	Sourav Ganguly	8 July 1972	285	Left-handed	Right-arm medium	Bengal
27	Robin Uthappa	11 November 1985	8	Right-handed	Right-arm medium	Karnataka
44	Virender Sehwag	20 October 1978	160	Right-handed	Right-arm off break	Delhi
12	Yuvraj Singh(vc)	12 December 1981	163	Left-handed	Slow left-arm orthodox	Punjab
7	M.S. Dhoni (wk)	7 July 1981	66	Right-handed	Wicket-keeper	Jharkhand
1	Dinesh Karthik (wk)	1 June 1985	13	Right-handed	Wicket-keeper	Tamil Nadu
63	Irfan Pathan	27 October 1984	73	Left-handed	Left-arm fast medium	Baroda
68	Ajit Agarkar	4 December 1977	180	Right-handed	Right-arm fast	Mumbai
3	Harbhajan Singh	3 July 1980	147	Right-handed	Right-arm off break	Punjab
37	Anil Kumble	17 October 1970	268	Right-handed	Right-arm leg break	Karnataka
34	Zaheer Khan	7 October 1978	113	Right-handed	Left-arm fast medium	Mumbai
36	S. Sreesanth	6 February 1983	27	Right-handed	Right-arm fast medium	Kerala
13	Munaf Patel	12 July 1983	17	Right-handed	Right-arm fast medium	Maharashtra

=== Sri Lanka ===
Sri Lanka announced their 15-man squad on 12 February 2007.

Coach: Tom Moody

No.	Player	Date of birth	ODIs	Batting	Bowling style	First-class team
27	Mahela Jayawardene (c)	27 May 1977	234	Right-handed	Right-arm medium	Sinhalese SC
69	Russel Arnold	25 October 1973	169	Left-handed	Right-arm off break	Nondescripts CC
46	Marvan Atapattu	22 November 1970	268	Right-handed	Right-arm leg break	Sinhalese SC
72	Malinga Bandara	31 December 1979	23	Right-handed	Right-arm leg break	Ragama CC
18	Tillakaratne Dilshan	14 October 1976	109	Right-handed	Right-arm off break	Bloomfield C&AC
26	Dilhara Fernando	19 July 1979	105	Right-handed	Right-arm fast medium	Sinhalese SC
07	Sanath Jayasuriya	30 June 1969	378	Left-handed	Slow left-arm orthodox	Bloomfield C&AC
02	Nuwan Kulasekara	22 July 1982	17	Right-handed	Right-arm fast medium	Colts CC
28	Farveez Maharoof	7 September 1984	60	Right-handed	Right-arm fast medium	Bloomfield C&AC
99	Lasith Malinga	4 September 1983	28	Right-handed	Right-arm fast	Nondescripts CC
08	Muttiah Muralitharan	17 April 1972	280	Right-handed	Right-arm off break	Tamil Union C&AC
11	Kumar Sangakkara	27 October 1977	182	Left-handed	Wicket-keeper	Nondescripts CC
05	Chamara Silva	14 December 1979	14	Right-handed	Right-arm leg break	Sebastianites C&AC
14	Upul Tharanga	2 February 1985	43	Left-handed		Nondescripts CC
22	Chaminda Vaas	27 January 1974	289	Left-handed	Left-arm fast medium	Colts CC

== Group C ==
=== Canada ===
Canada named their 15-man squad on 14 February 2007.

Coach: Andy Pick

No.	Player	Date of birth	ODIs	Batting	Bowling style	Domestic team(s)
9	John Davison (c)	9 May 1970	22	Right-handed	Right-arm off break	Mosman
77	Qaiser Ali	20 December 1978	11	Right-handed	Right-arm off break	Adastrians
10	Ashish Bagai	26 January 1982	26	Right-handed	Wicket-keeper	Toronto
84	Geoff Barnett	3 February 1984	6	Left-handed	Right-arm medium	Central Districts Stags; Meraloma
4	Umar Bhatti	4 January 1984	13	Left-handed	Left-arm medium	Victoria Park
3	Ian Billcliff	26 October 1972	10	Right-handed	Right-arm medium	University/Ellerslie
6	Desmond Chumney	8 January 1968	20	Right-handed	Right-arm off break	Victoria Park
15	Austin Codrington	22 August 1975	9	Right-handed	Right-arm fast medium	Victoria Park
7	George Codrington	26 November 1966	16	Right-handed	Right-arm fast medium	Victoria Park
99	Anderson Cummins	7 May 1966	10	Right-handed	Right-arm fast medium	Cavaliers
23	Sunil Dhaniram	17 October 1968	18	Left-handed	Slow left-arm orthodox	Cavaliers
80	Asif Mulla	5 May 1980	12	Right-handed	Wicket-keeper	Yorkshire
17	Henry Osinde	17 October 1978	17	Right-handed	Right-arm fast medium	WICC
21	Abdool Samad	3 May 1979	16	Right-handed	Right-arm off break	Cavaliers
25	Kevin Sandher	16 July 1980	13	Right-handed	Slow left-arm orthodox	Meraloma

=== England ===
England announced their final 15-man squad at The Oval on 14 February 2007. Jon Lewis was replaced by Stuart Broad on 4 April 2007 to allow him to return home to his wife as she was experiencing complications in the latter stages of her pregnancy.

Coach: Duncan Fletcher

No.	Player	Date of birth	ODIs	Batting	Bowling style	County team
99	Michael Vaughan (c)	29 October 1974	77	Right-handed	Right-arm off break	Yorkshire Phoenix
9	James Anderson	30 July 1982	57	Left-handed	Right-arm fast medium	Lancashire Lightning
7	Ian Bell	11 April 1982	36	Right-handed	Right-arm medium	Warwickshire Bears
42	Ravi Bopara	4 May 1985	1	Right-handed	Right-arm medium	Essex Eagles
5	Paul Collingwood	26 May 1976	112	Right-handed	Right-arm medium fast	Durham Dynamos
34	Jamie Dalrymple	21 January 1981	24	Right-handed	Right-arm off break	Middlesex Crusaders
11	Andrew Flintoff	6 December 1977	112	Right-handed	Right-arm fast	Lancashire Lightning
36	Ed Joyce	22 September 1978	12	Left-handed	Right-arm medium	Middlesex Crusaders
18	Jon Lewis	26 August 1975	12	Right-handed	Right-arm medium fast	Gloucestershire Gladiators
19	Sajid Mahmood	21 December 1981	19	Right-handed	Right-arm fast medium	Lancashire Lightning
47	Paul Nixon	21 October 1970	10	Left-handed	Wicket-keeper	Leicestershire Foxes
46	Monty Panesar	25 April 1982	9	Left-handed	Slow left-arm orthodox	Northamptonshire Steelbacks
24	Kevin Pietersen	27 June 1980	40	Right-handed	Right-arm off break	Hampshire Hawks
17	Liam Plunkett	6 April 1985	22	Right-handed	Right-arm fast medium	Durham Dynamos
14	Andrew Strauss	2 March 1977	74	Left-handed	Left-arm medium	Middlesex Crusaders
Replacement players
39	Stuart Broad	24 June 1986	5	Left-handed	Right-arm fast medium	Leicestershire Foxes

=== Kenya ===
Kenya named their 15-man squad on 13 February 2007.

Coach: Roger Harper

No.	Player	Date of birth	ODIs	Batting	Bowling style	Domestic team
5	Steve Tikolo (c)	25 June 1971	89	Right-handed	Right-arm medium	Swamibapa
07	Rajesh Bhudia	22 November 1984	0	Right-handed	Right-arm medium	Kanbis
11	Jimmy Kamande	12 December 1978	39	Right-handed	Right-arm off break	Parklands
89	Tanmay Mishra	22 December 1986	25	Right-handed	Right-arm fast medium	Aga Khan
13	Collins Obuya	27 July 1981	49	Right-handed	Right-arm leg break	Stray Lions
21	David Obuya	14 August 1979	41	Right-handed	Wicket-keeper	Stray Lions
35	Nehemiah Odhiambo	7 August 1983	16	Right-handed	Right-arm medium fast	Swamibapa
00	Thomas Odoyo	12 May 1978	87	Right-handed	Right-arm medium fast	Kanbis
77	Peter Ongondo	10 February 1977	47	Right-handed	Right-arm medium	Swamibapa
75	Lameck Onyango	22 September 1973	9	Right-handed	Right-arm medium	Swamibapa
17	Morris Ouma	8 November 1982	23	Right-handed	Wicket-keeper	Swamibapa
18	Malhar Patel	27 November 1983	3	Right-handed	Right-arm medium	Kanbis
4	Ravindu Shah	28 August 1972	53	Right-handed	Right-arm medium	Nairobi Gymkhana
09	Tony Suji	5 February 1976	53	Right-handed	Right-arm medium	Swamibapa
84	Hiren Varaiya	9 April 1984	15	Right-handed	Slow left-arm orthodox	Nairobi Gymkhana

=== New Zealand ===
New Zealand announced a preliminary squad on 14 January 2007, and announced their 15-man squad on 13 February 2007.

Daryl Tuffey was injured during the tournament; he was replaced by Chris Martin on 25 March.

Lou Vincent was injured during the tournament; he was replaced by Hamish Marshall on 26 March.

Coach: John Bracewell

No.	Player	Date of birth	ODIs	Batting	Bowling style	First-class team
7	Stephen Fleming (c)	1 April 1973	269	Left-handed	Right-arm medium	Wellington Firebirds
27	Shane Bond	7 June 1975	59	Right-handed	Right-arm fast	Canterbury Wizards
70	James Franklin	7 November 1980	56	Left-handed	Left-arm fast medium	Wellington Firebirds
50	Peter Fulton	1 February 1979	28	Right-handed	Right-arm medium	Canterbury Wizards
17	Mark Gillespie	17 October 1979	15	Right-handed	Right-arm fast medium	Wellington Firebirds
45	Michael Mason	27 August 1974	14	Right-handed	Right-arm fast medium	Central Districts Stags
42	Brendon McCullum	27 September 1981	104	Right-handed	Wicket-keeper	Canterbury Wizards
10	Craig McMillan	13 September 1976	187	Right-handed	Right-arm medium	Canterbury Wizards
24	Jacob Oram	28 July 1978	93	Left-handed	Right-arm medium	Central Districts Stags
39	Jeetan Patel	7 May 1980	17	Right-handed	Right-arm off break	Wellington Firebirds
56	Scott Styris	10 July 1975	123	Right-handed	Right-arm fast medium	Auckland Aces
3	Ross Taylor	8 March 1984	18	Right-handed	Right-arm off break	Central Districts Stags
14	Daryl Tuffey	11 June 1978	79	Right-handed	Right-arm fast medium	Northern Districts Knights
11	Daniel Vettori	27 January 1979	187	Left-handed	Slow left-arm orthodox	Northern Districts Knights
40	Lou Vincent	11 November 1978	94	Right-handed	Right-arm medium	Auckland Aces
Replacement players
32	Chris Martin	10 December 1979	9	Right-handed	Right-arm fast medium	Auckland Aces
34	Hamish Marshall	15 February 1979	63	Right-handed	Right-arm medium	Northern Districts Knights

== Group D ==
=== Ireland ===
Ireland named their squad in August 2006, the first country to do so, in order to assist the players in arranging work and training schedules. Irish player Ed Joyce, who turned out for Ireland in qualifying matches, was in England's squad.

Coach: Adrian Birrell

No.	Player	Date of birth	ODIs	Batting	Bowling style	Domestic team
23	Trent Johnston (c)	29 April 1974	7	Right-handed	Right-arm fast medium	Clontarf
21	Andre Botha	12 September 1975	8	Left-handed	Right-arm medium	North County
03	Jeremy Bray	30 November 1973	6	Left-handed		Eglinton
26	Kenny Carroll	22 March 1983	2	Right-handed	Right-arm legbreak	Railway Union
05	Peter Gillespie	11 May 1974	4	Right-handed	Right-arm medium	Strabane
76	Dave Langford-Smith	7 December 1976	7	Right-handed	Right-arm fast medium	Phoenix
07	Kyle McCallan	27 August 1975	8	Right-handed	Right-arm off break	Waringstown
10	John Mooney	10 February 1982	6	Left-handed	Right-arm medium	North County
32	Paul Mooney	15 October 1976	3	Right-handed	Right-arm medium	North County
50	Eoin Morgan	10 September 1986	6	Left-handed	Right-arm fast medium	Middlesex Crusaders
22	Kevin O'Brien	4 March 1984	7	Right-handed	Right-arm medium fast	Railway Union
00	Niall O'Brien	8 November 1981	7	Right-handed	Wicket-keeper	Northamptonshire Steelbacks
34	William Porterfield	6 September 1984	7	Left-handed		Rush, County Dublin
30	Boyd Rankin	5 July 1984	1	Right-handed	Right-arm fast medium	Derbyshire Phantoms
12	Andrew White	3 July 1980	8	Right-handed	Right-arm off break	Northamptonshire Steelbacks

=== Pakistan ===
Pakistan announced a preliminary squad on 10 January 2007, and the final 15-man squad on 13 February 2007. Both Shoaib Akhtar and Mohammad Asif were included, despite their ongoing doping case, where the Pakistan Cricket Board had first banned them before a tribunal reprieved the two. In a twist of fate, both players were replaced by Mohammad Sami and Yasir Arafat on 1 March due to knee and elbow injuries respectively.

Pakistan had already made one change due to injury: Azhar Mahmood joined the squad in place of Abdul Razzaq, who suffered a knee injury during a practice session on 26 February.

Coach: Bob Woolmer (died during tournament) and Mushtaq Ahmed (acting coach)

No.	Player	Date of birth	ODIs	Batting	Bowling style	First-class team(s)
8	Inzamam-ul-Haq (c)	3 March 1970	372	Right-handed	Slow left-arm orthodox	WAPDA/Multan
10	Shahid Afridi (vc)	1 March 1980	232	Right-handed	Right-arm leg break	HBL/Karachi Harbour
11	Azhar Mahmood	28 February 1975	142	Right-handed	Right-arm fast medium	HBL/Islamabad; Surrey Lions
99	Danish Kaneria	16 December 1980	16	Right-handed	Right-arm leg break	HBL/Karachi Harbour
16	Imran Nazir	31 December 1981	65	Right-handed	Right-arm leg break	NBP/Sialkot
23	Kamran Akmal	13 January 1982	62	Right-handed	Wicket-keeper	NBP/Lahore Ravi
88	Mohammad Hafeez	17 October 1980	44	Right-handed	Right-arm off break	SNGPL/Faisalabad
7	Mohammad Sami	24 February 1981	79	Right-handed	Right-arm fast	NBP/Karachi
13	Mohammad Yousuf	27 August 1974	229	Right-handed	Right-arm slow	WAPDA/Lahore Ravi
24	Rana Naved-ul-Hasan	28 February 1978	61	Right-handed	Right-arm medium fast	WAPDA/Sialkot; Sussex Sharks
21	Iftikhar Anjum	1 December 1980	26	Right-handed	Right-arm medium	ZTBL/Islamabad
18	Shoaib Malik	1 February 1982	134	Right-handed	Right-arm off break	PIA/Sialkot
55	Umar Gul	14 April 1984	25	Right-handed	Right-arm fast medium	HBL/Peshawar
27	Yasir Arafat	12 March 1982	7	Right-handed	Right-arm medium	KRL/Rawalpindi; Sussex Sharks
75	Younis Khan	29 November 1977	148	Right-handed	Right-arm leg break	HBL/Peshawar

=== West Indies ===
West Indies named their squad on 15 February 2007.

Coach: Bennett King

No.	Player	Date of birth	ODIs	Batting	Bowling style	First-class team
9	Brian Lara (c)	2 May 1969	286	Left-handed	Right-arm leg break googly	Trinidad and Tobago
46	Ian Bradshaw	9 July 1974	59	Left-handed	Left-arm fast medium	Barbados
47	Dwayne Bravo	7 October 1983	59	Right-handed	Right-arm fast medium	Trinidad and Tobago; Kent Spitfires
6	Shivnarine Chanderpaul	18 August 1974	208	Left-handed	Right-arm leg break	Guyana
32	Corey Collymore	21 December 1977	77	Right-handed	Right-arm fast medium	Barbados
45	Chris Gayle	21 September 1979	156	Left-handed	Right-arm off break	Jamaica
55	Kieron Pollard	12 May 1987	0	Right-handed	Right-arm medium	Trinidad and Tobago
39	Daren Powell	15 April 1978	15	Right-handed	Right-arm fast medium	Jamaica
80	Denesh Ramdin	13 March 1985	22	Right-handed	Wicket-keeper	Trinidad and Tobago
52	Marlon Samuels	5 February 1981	83	Right-handed	Right-arm off break	Jamaica
53	Ramnaresh Sarwan	23 June 1980	115	Right-handed	Right-arm leg break	Guyana
54	Lendl Simmons	25 January 1985	6	Right-handed	Right-arm medium fast	Trinidad and Tobago
28	Devon Smith	21 October 1981	10	Left-handed	Right-arm off break	Windward Islands
50	Dwayne Smith	12 April 1983	59	Right-handed	Right-arm medium	Barbados
75	Jerome Taylor	22 June 1984	28	Right-handed	Right-arm fast	Jamaica

=== Zimbabwe ===
Zimbabwe's 15-man squad was announced on 14 February; only one player remains from the 2003 squad.

Coach: Kevin Curran

No.	Player	Date of birth	ODIs	Batting	Bowling style	First-class team
52	Prosper Utseya (c)	26 March 1985	59	Right-handed	Right-arm off break	Manicaland
12	Gary Brent	13 January 1976	57	Right-handed	Right-arm medium fast	Manicaland
33	Justice Chibhabha	6 September 1986	22	Right-handed	Right-arm medium	Mashonaland
47	Elton Chigumbura	14 March 1986	53	Right-handed	Right-arm medium	Manicaland
17	Keith Dabengwa	17 August 1980	12	Left-handed	Slow left-arm orthodox	Matabeleland
72	Terry Duffin	20 March 1982	22	Left-handed	Right-arm medium	Matabeleland
88	Anthony Ireland	30 August 1984	25	Right-handed	Right-arm medium	Midlands
10	Friday Kasteni	25 March 1988	1	Left-handed	Wicket-keeper	Midlands
45	Stuart Matsikenyeri	3 May 1983	60	Right-handed	Right-arm off break	Manicaland
28	Christopher Mpofu	27 November 1985	18	Right-handed	Right-arm medium	Matabeleland
53	Tawanda Mupariwa	16 April 1985	19	Right-handed	Right-arm fast medium	Matabeleland
23	Ed Rainsford	14 December 1984	23	Right-handed	Right-arm fast medium	Midlands
26	Vusi Sibanda	10 October 1983	46	Right-handed	Right-arm medium	Midlands
1	Brendan Taylor	6 February 1983	60	Right-handed	Wicket-keeper	Mashonaland
14	Sean Williams	26 September 1986	13	Left-handed	Slow left-arm orthodox	Matabeleland
