= Kenyan cricket team in Canada in 2006 =

	Kenya	Canada
- Dates: 29 July 2006 – 6 August 2006
Captains	Steve Tikolo	John Davison

One Day International series
- Results: Kenya won the 2-match series 2–0
Most runs	Steve Tikolo 79	Geoff Barnett 46
Most wickets	Hiren Varaiya 7	Sanjayan Thuraisingam 4 John Davison 4

The Kenyan cricket team toured Canada between 29 July and 6 August 2006. The two teams played a Group B match in the 2006–07 ICC Intercontinental Cup and 2 One-day Internationals.

This was originally scheduled to be a triangular series between Bermuda, Canada and Kenya. However, after Kenya rescheduled their ODIs with Bangladesh due to their lack of financial backing, they also cancelled their matches against Bermuda. The ODI series followed the Intercontinental Cup tie between the two nations, which Canada shaded by 25 runs; however, in the short form, Kenya won after bowling Canada out for 129 in the first match and 94 in the second.

== ICC Inter-Continental Cup 2006–07 ==
29 July – 1 August 2006
Scorecard

Canada	v	Kenya
235 (73.3 overs); Qaiser Ali 91* (160); Peter Ongondo 4/49 (19 overs)		231 (87.2 overs); Tanmay Mishra 83* (168); Henry Osinde 4/51 (26 overs)
286 (79.5 overs); Geoff Barnett 136 (212); Nehemiah Odhiambo 5/54 (15.5 overs)		265 (103.1 overs); Collins Obuya 89 (187); Umar Bhatti 6/65 (24.1 overs)

Canada won by 25 runs
Maple Leaf North-West Ground, King City, Ontario
Umpires: Roger Dill (Ber) and Courtney Young (Cayman Islands)
Player of the match: Geoff Barnett (Can) and Umar Bhatti (Can)

- Canada won the toss and elected to bat.
- Points: Canada 20, Kenya 0.

== One Day Internationals (ODIs) ==
Kenya won the series 2–0.

=== 1st ODI ===
5 August 2006
Scorecard

Kenya; 237/9 (50 overs)	v	Canada; 129 (38.2 overs)
JK Kamande 68 (106); S Thuraisingam 4/35 (9 overs)		GR Codrington 40 (73); HA Varaiya 3/24 (9 overs)

Kenya won by 108 runs
Toronto Cricket, Skating and Curling Club Ground, Toronto
Umpires: R Dill (BER) and DJ Harper (AUS)
Player of the match: JK Kamande (KEN)

- Kenya won the toss and elected to bat.
- HA Varaiya (KEN) and Qaiser Ali (CAN) made their ODI debuts

=== 2nd ODI ===
6 August 2006
Scorecard

Canada; 94 (33.2 overs)	v	Kenya; 97/5 (32.2 overs)
GEF Barnett 35 (61); HA Varaiya 4/25 (9.2 overs)		SO Tikolo 29* (44); JM Davison 3/43 (9 overs)

Kenya won by 5 wickets
Toronto Cricket, Skating and Curling Club Ground, Toronto
Umpires: R Dill (BER) and DJ Harper (AUS)
Player of the match: SO Tikolo (KEN)

- Canada won the toss and elected to bat.
