= Pakistani cricket team in England in 2006 =

International cricket tour

Pakistan in England 2006
	Pakistan	England
- Dates: 1 July – 10 September 2006
Captains	Inzamam-ul-Haq	Andrew Strauss

Test series
- Result: England won the 4-match series 3–0
Most runs	Mohammad Yousuf (631)	Andrew Strauss (444)
Most wickets	Umar Gul (18)	Steve Harmison (20)
- Player of the series: Mohammad Yousuf (Pak) and Andrew Strauss (Eng)

One Day International series
- Results: 5-match series drawn 2–2
Most runs	Younis Khan (215)	Ian Bell (227)
Most wickets	Shoaib Akhtar (9)	Jon Lewis (7)
- Player of the series: Younis Khan (Pak)

Twenty20 International series
- Results: Pakistan won the 1-match series 1–0
Most runs	Mohammad Hafeez (46)	Marcus Trescothick (53)
Most wickets	Abdul Razzaq (3)	Stuart Broad (2)
- Player of the series: Shahid Afridi (Pak)

The Pakistan national cricket team toured England in 2006 for a four-match Test series, a five-match One Day International series and a single Twenty20 International. After a drawn first Test, England won the next two matches before being awarded the final match in controversial circumstances; on the fourth day, Pakistan's players were penalised for ball tampering and refused to resume play after the tea interval, leading the umpires to award England the match and a 3–0 series victory. In 2008, the ICC controversially declared the result of the final Test as a draw, altering the scoreline to 2–0; however, after criticism, not least by the MCC, this was subsequently reversed in February 2009 and the result restored as an England victory.

== Background ==
England had toured Pakistan the previous winter, with Pakistan winning the three-match Test series 2–0 and the five-match ODI series 3–2. As a result of the Test series, Pakistan rose two spots in the world Test rankings to be ranked second going into the return tour, and England dropped to third after the 12 July annual update of the ICC Test Championship.

== Schedule ==
Date	Match	Venue
June
27	ODI v Scotland	The Grange
July
1–3	Tour match	Grace Road
6–9	Tour match	St Lawrence Ground
13–17	1st Test	Lord's
20–23	Tour match	County Ground, Northampton
27–31	2nd Test	Old Trafford
August
4–8	3rd Test	Headingley
12	Tour match	Denis Compton Oval
13	Tour match	Denis Compton Oval
17–21	4th Test	The Oval
28	T20I	County Ground, Bristol
30	1st ODI	Sophia Gardens
September
2	2nd ODI	Lord's
5	3rd ODI	The Rose Bowl, Southampton
8	4th ODI	Trent Bridge
10	5th ODI	Edgbaston

== Squads ==
Pakistan
Name	Style	Domestic team(s)
Inzamam-ul-Haq (c)	RHB, SLA	Multan
Kamran Akmal (wk)	RHB	NBP, Lahore Ravi
Abdul Razzaq	RHB, RFM	Lahore Ravi
Danish Kaneria	RHB, LB	HBL, Karachi Urban
Faisal Iqbal	RHB, RM	PIA, Karachi Harbour
Iftikhar Anjum	RHB, RM	ZTBL, Islamabad
Imran Farhat	LHB, LB	HBL, Lahore Shalimar
Mohammad Asif	LHB, RFM	NBP, Sialkot
Mohammad Hafeez	RHB, OB	SNGPL, Faisalabad
Mohammad Sami	RHB, RF	NBP, Karachi Harbour
Mohammad Yousuf	RHB	WAPDA, Lahore Ravi
Naved-ul-Hasan	RHB, RMF	Sialkot
Salman Butt	LHB, OB	NBP, Lahore Shalimar
Samiullah Khan Niazi	RHB, LMF	SNGPL, Faisalabad
Shahid Afridi	RHB, LBG	HBL
Shahid Nazir	RHB, RFM	HBL, Faisalabad
Shahid Yousuf	RHB, RMF	NBP, Sialkot
Shoaib Akhtar	RHB, RF	Rawalpindi
Shoaib Malik	RHB, OB	PIA, Sialkot
Taufeeq Umar	LHB, OB	HBL, Lahore Ravi
Umar Gul	RHB, RFM	PIA, Peshawar
Younis Khan	RHB, RM	HBL, Peshawar
Naved-ul-Hasan withdrew before the series started, and was replaced by Samiullah Khan Niazi. He returned to the squad for the fourth Test, but was not selected. On 15 July, Mohammad Asif and Shoaib Malik returned home, and were replaced by Iftikhar Anjum and Taufeeq Umar. Iftikhar Anjum left several days later following his father's death, with no replacement called up. Salman Butt, Samiullah Khan Niazi and Taufeeq Umar travelled home before the fourth Test, and Mohammad Hafeez was called up. Faisal Iqbal, Mohammad Sami and Shahid Nazir returned home after the Test series, and were replaced by Shahid Yousuf and Shoaib Malik. Mohammad Asif and Shoaib Akhtar only played in the ODI series, having returned from injury.

England
Name	Style	Domestic team
Andrew Strauss (c)	LHB, LM	Middlesex
Geraint Jones (wk)	RHB	Kent
Chris Read wk	RHB	Nottinghamshire
Ian Bell	RHB, RM	Warwickshire
Stuart Broad	LHB, RMF	Leicestershire
Rikki Clarke	RHB, RFM	Surrey
Paul Collingwood	RHB, RM	Durham
Alastair Cook	LHB, OB	Essex
Jamie Dalrymple	RHB, OB	Middlesex
Darren Gough	RHB, RF	Essex
Steve Harmison	RHB, RF	Durham
Matthew Hoggard	RHB, RFM	Yorkshire
Ed Joyce	LHB, RM	Middlesex
Jon Lewis	RHB, RM	Gloucestershire
Sajid Mahmood	RHB, RFM	Lancashire
Graham Onions	RHB, RFM	Durham
Monty Panesar	LHB, SLA	Northamptonshire
Kevin Pietersen	RHB, OB	Hampshire
Liam Plunkett	RHB, RMF	Durham
Marcus Trescothick	LHB, RM	Somerset
Michael Yardy	LHB, SLA	Sussex
Dalrymple was only selected for the second Test, and later withdrawn along with Plunkett as the squad was cut down from 14 to 12. Read was added for the third Test after Jones suffered a finger injury, though the English chairman of selectors said that "the decision was taken regardless of the injury to Geraint's finger" He also played the fourth Test. Broad, Clarke, Gough, Joyce and Yardy were only selected for the ODI squad. Hoggard and Panesar were only selected for the Test squad. Gough withdrew after the second ODI with a shin injury, and Onions was called up to replace him.

== Tour matches ==
=== First-class: Leicestershire v Pakistanis ===
1–3 July 2006
Scorecard

Leicestershire	v	Pakistanis
315/9d (81 overs); Dinesh Mongia 129 (234); Mohammad Sami 3/53 (17 overs)		304/5d (85 overs); Imran Farhat 81 (132); Nick Walker 3/47 (24 overs)
191 (43 overs); Tom New 67 (108); Danish Kaneria 4/32 (11 overs)		207/2 (40.2 overs); Shoaib Malik 110 (124); Chris Liddle 2/27 (10 overs)

Pakistanis won by 8 wickets
Grace Road, Leicester
Umpires: Neil Bainton (Eng) and John Holder (Eng)

- Pakistanis won the toss and elected to field.
- Matthew Boyce (Leics) made his first-class debut.

=== First-class: Pakistanis v England A ===
1–3 July 2006
Scorecard

England A	v	Pakistanis
595/9d (173 overs); Chris Read 150*; Danish Kaneria 4/158 (48 overs)		242 (73.1 overs); Faisal Iqbal 82 (150); Jamie Dalrymple 4/61 (24 overs)
153/1d (44.1 overs); Alastair Cook 80 (128); Imran Farhat 1/46 (20 overs)		154/2 (50 overs); Salman Butt 50 (90)

Match drawn
Grace Road, Leicester
Umpires: Daryl Hair (Aus) and Richard Illingworth (Eng)

- Pakistanis won the toss and elected to field.
- In Pakistan's second innings, both batsmen retired out.

=== First-class: Northamptonshire v Pakistanis ===
20–22 July 2006
Scorecard

Northamptonshire	v	Pakistanis
269/3d (62.3 overs); Stephen Peters 142 (195); Samiullah Khan 2/35 (8.3 overs)		250/9d (64.5 overs); Mohammad Yousuf 202 (330); David Wigley 5/77 (22.5 overs)
140 (38.3 overs); Ben Phillips 39 (58); Shahid Nazir 3/33 (7 overs)		160/3 (40.2 overs); Salman Butt 84 (120); Bilal Shafayat 2/25 (7 overs)

Pakistanis won by 7 wickets
Wantage Road, Northampton
Umpires: Nick Cook (Eng) and Neil Mallender (Eng)

- Northamptonshire won the toss and elected to bat.

=== One-day: Pakistanis vs West Indies A ===
12 August 2006
10:45
Scorecard

West Indies A (Cricket West Indies); 214/4 (40 overs)	v	Pakistanis; 123/3 (22 overs)
Lendl Simmons 108* (122); Samiullah Khan 3/30 (6 overs)		Imran Farhat 62* (43); Richard Kelly 2/27 (5 overs)

No result
Denis Compton Oval, Shenley
Umpires: Trevor Jesty (Eng) and Richard Kettleborough (Eng)

- Pakistanis won the toss and elected to field.
- Rain meant the match was reduced to 40 overs a side. Further rain ended the Pakistanis' innings after 22 overs.

=== List A: Pakistanis vs West Indies A ===
13 August 2006
10:45
Scorecard

Pakistanis	v	(Cricket West Indies) West Indies A

Match abandoned without a ball bowled
Denis Compton Oval, Shenley
Umpires: Trevor Jesty (Eng) and Richard Kettleborough (Eng)

- No toss.
- No play was possible due to a waterlogged pitch.

== Test series ==
=== 1st Test ===
13–17 July 2006
Scorecard

England	v	Pakistan
528/9d (158.3 overs); Paul Collingwood 186 (327); Danish Kaneria 3/119 (52 overs)		445 (119.3 overs); Mohammad Yousuf 202 (330); Steve Harmison 4/94 (29.3 overs)
296/8d (84.5 overs); Andrew Strauss 128 (214); Danish Kaneria 3/77 (30 overs)		214/4 (73 overs); Inzamam-ul-Haq 56 (111); Monty Panesar 2/60 (27 overs)

Match drawn
Lord's, London
Umpires: Simon Taufel (Aus) and Steve Bucknor (WI)
Player of the match: Mohammad Yousuf (Pak)

- England won the toss and elected to bat.

England made an opening stand 60 runs before losing their first two wickets in quick succession, as Marcus Trescothick fell, followed an over later by captain Andrew Strauss. Kevin Pietersen was the next man out, adding just 28 runs for the third wicket, but Alastair Cook and Paul Collingwood both reached centuries on the way to a fourth-wicket partnership of 233 runs before Cook was out for 105. Collingwood top-scored in the innings with 186, and Ian Bell also managed an unbeaten 100 before England immediately declared on 528/9 with half a session left in the second day's play.

Steve Harmison took two wickets in three balls before the close of play, helping England reduce Pakistan to 68/4 early on the third day; however, Mohammad Yousuf and captain Inzamam-ul-Haq added 173 runs for the fifth wicket, and Kamran Akmal also made a half-century, reaching 58 before he was caught behind off the bowling of Kevin Pietersen. Despite partners falling around him, Mohammad Yousuf managed to bat on to a double-century before he was caught behind off Harmison to close the innings – Harmison finished with figures of 4/94.

England began the process of building on their 83-run lead early on the fourth day, but Strauss' 128 was the only notable score as they amassed 296 runs before declaring early on the final day, giving Pakistan a target of 380 to chase in 73 overs. Salman Butt fell to the first ball of the innings from Hoggard, followed by Imran Farhat to leave the tourists at 33/2; however, scores of 48 from Faisal Iqbal and Mohammad Yousuf got them to 141/4, before Inzamam-ul-Haq and Abdul Razzaq batted out the last session for 73 to secure a draw.

=== 2nd Test ===
27–29 July 2006
Scorecard

Pakistan	v	England
119 (38.4 overs); Younis Khan 44 (62); Steve Harmison 6/19 (13 overs)		461/9d (133 overs); Alastair Cook 127 (260); Umar Gul 3/96 (28 overs)
222 (67.1 overs); Younis Khan 62 (119); Steve Harmison 5/57 (18.1 overs)

England won by an innings and 120 runs
Old Trafford, Manchester
Umpires: Simon Taufel (Aus) and Steve Bucknor (WI)
Player of the match: Steve Harmison (Eng)

- Pakistan won the toss and elected to bat.

With Inzamam-ul-Haq's run of half-centuries against England finally stopped, as he was caught by Kevin Pietersen off Steve Harmison's bowling for a duck, England recorded an innings victory over Pakistan to take a 1–0 lead into the third Test. In the first innings, Pakistan lost the last eight wickets for 29 to post 119 with no batsmen making a half-century; England surpassed that score for the loss of two wickets, and with Alastair Cook and Ian Bell both making hundreds (127 and 106* respectively), England could eventually declare near the end of day two having made 461. It took England 63 overs to clean up, with Harmison and Monty Panesar sharing the ten wickets evenly (the only wicket takers in both innings) with the help of wicket keeper Geraint Jones, who caught five despite his fractured finger. Panesar took his second five-wicket-haul in three months, and was praised by opposition coach Bob Woolmer.

=== 3rd Test ===
4–8 August 2006
Scorecard

England	v	Pakistan
515 (123 overs); Kevin Pietersen 135 (169); Umar Gul 5/123 (29 overs)		538 (141.4 overs); Mohammad Yousuf 192 (261); Monty Panesar 3/127 (47.4 overs)
345 (88.3 overs); Andrew Strauss 116 (171); Shahid Nazir 3/32 (14 overs)		155 (47.5 overs); Younis Khan 41 (83); Sajid Mahmood 4/22 (8 overs)

England won by 167 runs
Headingley, Leeds
Umpires: Billy Doctrove (WI) and Darrell Hair (Aus)
Player of the match: Younis Khan (Pak)

- England won the toss and elected to bat.

After their innings defeat in the second test, Pakistan dropped Shahid Afridi and Abdul Razzaq, and had to swap Imran Farhat out due to injury. They brought in Salman Butt and Taufeeq Umar to open the innings, plus the bowling of Shahid Nazir. England only made one change, which was to swap the struggling wicketkeeper Geraint Jones for Chris Read. The wicketkeeper position had been the subject of much debate. Read was perceived as the better keeper, although Jones' batting skills were considered to be superior. However, Jones had not scored a significant innings for some time and Read was given an opportunity to impress for the first time since the West Indies tour of 2004.

The first day of the test prompted some interesting incidents as England won the toss and batted first. In the morning, there were three rogue decisions from the umpires (who had been testing the use of earpieces to communicate with off-field officials); in the afternoon Kevin Pietersen left the field in bizarre circumstances, and Pakistan responded with 11 overs of very mediocre bowling, using their opening batsmen to bowl during the period before the second new ball was due.

In amongst all this, Pietersen scored his 5th test century, and helped propel England to 347/6 by the end of the day. England continued on day 2, with Ian Bell posting his third consecutive test century, and the lower order added useful runs before England were bowled out for 515.

Pakistan's openers once again struggled, and they fell quickly to leave the tourists on 36/2. However, the experienced combination of Younis Khan and Mohammad Yousuf then combined to produce the largest partnership for Pakistan against England of 363 for the third wicket. They batted well into the afternoon session of the third day, before Yousuf gloved Stephen Harmison through to the keeper having scored 192.

Pakistan then lost some of their advantage in a bizarre passage of play leading up to the tea interval. Younis was run out on 173, Faisal Iqbal fell lbw to his first delivery faced (giving Paul Collingwood his first test wicket), and Inzamam-ul-Haq lost his wicket in a comical way, overbalancing while attempting to sweep a Monty Panesar delivery and falling onto his stumps.

The lower order batsmen tried to accelerate the scoring, but lost regular wickets in the process, and Pakistan were finally bowled out for 538.

England's second innings started well, with the openers putting on 158 for the first wicket. Andrew Strauss went on to score 116, and Chris Read scored 55 down the order, but the other wickets fell quite regularly as England attempted to set up a position where they could push for a win on the final day. Pakistan's bowling attack shared the wickets between them, and eventually bowled England out for 345. Pakistan needed 323 runs on the final day to win.

England's bowlers performed well on the final day, and took 5 wickets in the first session ensuring the 323 run target was well out of Pakistan's reach. The run out of Mohammad Yousuf for a single figure score was a key moment in the innings – in fact, Pakistan lost 3 of their top order batsmen to run outs during the game. Sajid Mahmood struck twice in an over shortly before lunch to remove Faisal Iqbal and Kamran Akmal, and would go on to record test best figures of 4/22.

Monty Panesar also demonstrated his promising talent, taking 3 wickets in the second innings to follow up on 3 wickets in the first, on a pitch not typically associated with assisting spinners. His dismissal of Younis Khan during the afternoon session was spectacular, with a wonderfully flighted delivery that just clipped the bail of the off stump.

From this point, it was a matter of time before England took the honours.

As a result of a rib injury obtained during the course of the Test (and determined to be an internal injury rather than an external one) the Pakistan Captain, Inzamam-ul-Haq, was unable to bat for 4h20m in the Pakistan 2nd innings, or until the fall of the 5th wicket (whichever came first). As England took five wickets in the first session of the last day, he was able to come in at number 7 in the order. His wicket was eventually the last to fall, being stumped off the bowling of Monty Panesar, and Pakistan were all out for 155.

England won the match by 167 runs, and took an unassailable 2–0 lead in the series, with one left to play.

=== 4th Test ===
17–20 August 2006
Scorecard

England	v	Pakistan
173 (53.2 overs); Alastair Cook 40 (69); Umar Gul 4/46 (15.2 overs)		504 (129.5 overs); Mohammad Yousuf 128 (236); Monty Panesar 4/125 (30.5 overs)
298/4 (72 overs); Kevin Pietersen 96 (114); Shahid Nazir 1/26 (8 overs)

Match awarded to England
The Oval, London
Umpires: Billy Doctrove (WI) and Darrell Hair (Aus)
Player of the match: Younis Khan (Pak)
Players of the Series: Andrew Strauss (Eng) and Mohammad Yousuf (Pak)

- Pakistan won the toss and elected to field.
- Match abandoned on day 4 as Pakistan refused to resume play after tea; the match was subsequently awarded to England.

Pakistan made three changes to their side for the final test. The uncertainty of the opening pair continued, with Salman Butt and Taufeeq Umar being dropped in favour of Imran Farhat and Mohammad Hafeez. The tourists' bowling ranks were boosted by the return of Mohammad Asif, for whom Mohammad Sami made way.

Pakistan won the toss and chose to field in cloudy conditions. This proved to be a good decision, as Pakistan's seamers Umar Gul and Mohammad Asif took eight wickets between them on the way to bowling England out for 173. Asif in particular caused problems for England's batsmen, and left people wondering what the outcome of the series would have been had he not been injured for the earlier tests.

Late on day 1, Pakistan began their reply confidently, and their fourth opening partnership combination of the series proved to be the most successful one. Hafeez hit some good shots before retiring hurt with a knee problem. He would return to complete his innings and score 95, while Farhat scored 91. England's poor first day was complete when they dropped Mohammad Yousuf twice before he reached double figures. He went on to score 128, his third century of the series.

Pakistan continued their dominance of the match on day 2, with the close of play score at 336/3, a lead of 163. On day 3, England finally managed to start taking wickets in between frequent rain and bad light interruptions, but they were not able to curtail Pakistan's scoring. Faisal Iqbal ended on 58 not out, his first contribution in the series. Pakistan were finally bowled out for 504, a lead of 331.

Marcus Trescothick was dismissed early in England's second innings, in what would be his last test match appearance for England. Andrew Strauss and Alastair Cook then progressed the score to 78/1 at the close of play.

The (what would prove to be eventful) fourth day began with Strauss and Cook continuing on the improved batting performance before Strauss fell lbw to Danish Kaneria with the score on 115. Kevin Pietersen came in and played an aggressive innings, hitting 96 from 114 deliveries, and only falling when he chased a wide delivery in an attempt to bring up his century.

The dismissal of Cook for 83 off the bowling of Umar Gul, with a delivery of reverse swing, resulted in umpires Darrell Hair and Billy Doctrove calling a halt to play so a set of used balls could be brought out to the middle: Hair and Doctrove ruled that the ball had been tampered with, and awarded 5 penalty runs to England.

Following this incident, Pakistan subsequently refused to continue the match after tea: in keeping with the Laws of Cricket, and despite protests from Pakistan players and officials, Hair and Doctrove awarded the match to England on a forfeit.

The ICC changed the result of the match to a draw in July 2008, but reversed this decision on 1 February 2009.

== T20 series ==
=== Only T20I ===
28 August 2006
15:00
Scorecard

England; 144/7 (20 overs)	v	Pakistan; 148/5 (17.5 overs)
Marcus Trescothick 53 (36); Abdul Razzaq 3/30 (4 overs)		Mohammad Hafeez 46 (40); Stuart Broad 2/35 (4 overs)

Pakistan won by 5 wickets
Nevil Road, Bristol
Umpires: Peter Hartley and Nigel Llong

- England won the toss and elected to bat.
- Ian Bell, Stuart Broad and Michael Yardy (all Eng) made their T20I debuts.
- This was Pakistan's first T20I match.

Pakistan won the match by five wickets. After bowling out four of England's upper order batsmen for fewer than 20 runs between them, Pakistan secured a comfortable win aided by Shahid Afridi who struck 28 off just 10 balls (22 of these in a single over).

== England ODI series ==
=== 1st ODI ===
30 August 2006
14:30 (D/N)
Scorecard

England; 202 (49.2 overs)	v	Pakistan; 46/1 (7 overs)
Ian Bell 88 (117); Mohammad Asif 3/28 (10 overs)		Mohammad Hafeez 18* (23); Stuart Broad 1/14 (3 overs)

No result
Sophia Gardens, Cardiff
Umpires: Billy Doctrove (WI) and Ian Gould (Eng)

- Pakistan won the toss and elected to field.
- Pakistan's innings was reduced to 32 overs due to rain and they were set a revised target of 159.

=== 2nd ODI ===
2 September 2006
10:15
Scorecard

England; 166 (39.1 overs)	v	Pakistan; 169/3 (36.4 overs)
Rikki Clarke 39 (47); Shoaib Akhtar 4/28 (8 overs)		Younis Khan 55 (89); Jon Lewis 2/11 (8 overs)

Pakistan won by 7 wickets (D/L)
Lord's, London
Umpires: Mark Benson and Billy Doctrove (WI)
Player of the match: Shoaib Akhtar (Pak)

- Pakistan won the toss and elected to field.
- Late start due to rain reduced both innings to 46 overs; further rain reduced Pakistan innings to 40 overs.

=== 3rd ODI ===
5 September 2006
14:30 (D/N)
Scorecard

England; 271/9 (50 overs)	v	Pakistan; 274/8 (48.5 overs)
Jamie Dalrymple 62 (78); Naved-ul-Hasan 4/57 (10 overs)		Younis Khan 101 (109); Stuart Broad 3/57 (10 over)

Pakistan won by 2 wickets
Rose Bowl, Southampton
Umpires: Billy Doctrove (WI) and Nigel Llong
Player of the match: Younis Khan (Pak)

- Pakistan won the toss and elected to field.
- Marcus Trescothick played his final ODI game.

Shoaib Akhtar was in the spotlight after television cameras caught him working on the ball. The pictures appeared to show Akhtar flicking his thumb at the ball. However, ICC referee Mike Procter analysed the TV footage and decided there was no case to answer on behalf of the Pakistani team.

=== 4th ODI ===
8 September 2006
14:30 (D/N)
Scorecard

Pakistan; 235/8 (50 overs)	v	England; 237/2 (46.2 overs)
Abdul Razzaq 75* (72); Michael Yardy 3/24 (10 overs)		Ian Bell 86* (111); Mohammad Hafeez 1/21 (4.2 overs)

England won by 8 wickets
Trent Bridge, Nottingham
Umpires: Mark Benson and Daryl Harper (Aus)
Player of the match: Ian Bell (Eng)

- Pakistan won the toss and elected to bat.
- Michael Yardy (Eng) made his ODI debut.

=== 5th ODI ===
10 September 2006
10:15
Scorecard

Pakistan; 154/9 (50 overs)	v	England; 155/7 (31 overs)
Younis Khan 47 (80); Jamie Dalrymple 2/13 (6 overs)		Andrew Strauss 35 (41); Shahid Afridi 2/14 (5 overs)

England won by 3 wickets
Edgbaston, Birmingham
Umpires: Ian Gould (Eng) and Daryl Harper (Aus)
Player of the match: Sajid Mahmood (Eng)

- England won the toss and elected to field.

== Scotland ODI match ==
=== Only ODI ===
27 June 2006
10:45
Scorecard

Scotland; 203/8 (50 overs)	v	Pakistan; 205/5 (43.5 overs)
Ryan Watson 80 (85); Shoaib Malik 3/35 (10 overs)		Mohammad Yousuf 83* (113); Paul Hoffmann 3/22 (10 overs)

Pakistan won by 5 wickets
Grange Cricket Club Ground, Edinburgh
Umpires: Daryl Hair (Aus) and Subhash Modi (Ken)
Player of the match: Mohammad Yousuf (Pak)

- Pakistan won the toss and elected to field.
- Paul Hoffmann, Dougie Lockhart, Ross Lyons, Neil McCallum, Neil MacRae, Dewald Nel, Colin Smith and Ryan Watson (all Sco) made their ODI debuts.

Pakistan won the match by five wickets, after Scotland lost four wickets in the first eight overs and then four more in the remaining 42. Ryan Watson and Neil McCallum put on 116 for the fifth wicket, an ODI record partnership for Scotland, who played their first ODI for seven years. Their innings also doubled the number of ODI fifties scored for Scotland.

== External sources ==
CricketArchive
