= Wasim Bari (Emirati cricketer) =

Emirati cricketer

Personal information
- Born: 22 November 1988 (age 37); Dubai, United Arab Emirates
- Batting: Right-handed
- Bowling: Right-arm medium-fast
- Role: All-rounder

International information
- National side: United Arab Emirates (2006–2013)
- Source: CricketArchive, 6 September 2016

Wasim Bari (born 22 November 1988) is an Emirati international cricketer who has represented the United Arab Emirates national team. He is a right-arm pace bowler.

Bari was born in Dubai. Having earlier represented his country at under-15 and under-17 level, he played for the UAE under-19s at the 2005 ACC Under-19 Cup in Nepal and the 2007 ACC Under-19 Elite Cup in Malaysia. His performance at the 2005 tournament included figures of 3/31 against Kuwait and 2/20 against Malaysia, while at the 2007 tournament he top-scored with 45 against Singapore. Bari made his senior debut for the UAE in November 2006, appearing against Nepal in an ACC Premier League match. His first-class debut came the following month, in an ICC Intercontinental Cup match against Namibia. He took a five-wicket haul, 5/130, in Namibia's only innings, but his team lost by an innings and 149 runs. Bari has since made another three Intercontinental Cup appearances, playing against Ireland in 2007 and against Kenya in 2008 and 2011. He also represented the UAE at the 2007 and 2013 ACC Twenty20 Cups.
