= Ravishankar Puvendran =

Canadian cricketer (born 1964)

Personal information
- Born: 26 January 1964 (age 62); Colombo, Sri Lanka
- Batting: Left-handed
- Bowling: Slow left-arm orthodox

International information
- National side: Canada

Career statistics
Competition	First-class
Matches	2
Runs scored	13
Batting average	6.50
100s/50s	0/0
Top score	13
Balls bowled	462
Wickets	4
Bowling average	49.50
5 wickets in innings	0
10 wickets in match	0
Best bowling	3/66
Catches/stumpings	1/–
- Source: CricketArchive, 14 October 2011

Ravishankar Puvendran (born 26 January 1964) usually known as Ravi Puvendran is a Canadian cricket player. He is a left-handed batsman and left-arm spin bowler. He played two first-class matches for Canada, against Kenya and Bermuda in the ICC Intercontinental Cup in 2006.

In February 2020, he was named in Canada's squad for the Over-50s Cricket World Cup in South Africa. However, the tournament was cancelled during the third round of matches due to the coronavirus pandemic.
