= Mangesh Panchal =

Indian-born Dutch cricketer (born 1973)

Personal information
- Born: 27 December 1973 (age 52); Bombay, Maharashtra, India
- Batting: Right-handed
- Bowling: Right arm leg spin
- Role: Bowler

International information
- National side: Netherlands
- Only ODI (cap 39): 18 August 2007 v Bermuda

Career statistics
Competition	ODI	First-class
Matches	1	3
Runs scored	–	25
Batting average	–	6.25
100s/50s	–	0/0
Top score	–	14
Balls bowled	30	336
Wickets	0	13
Bowling average	–	16.76
5 wickets in innings	–	1
10 wickets in match	–	0
Best bowling	–	5/34
Catches/stumpings	0/–	0/–
- Source: CricketArchive, 23 July 2009

Mangesh Panchal (born 27 December 1973) is an Indian-born Dutch former One Day International cricketer. He made his debut for the Netherlands against Bermuda in August 2007, which remains his only One Day International appearance for the Netherlands.
