= Stewart Heaney =

Canadian cricketer (born 1980)

Cricket information
- Batting: Right-handed
- Bowling: Right-arm offbreak
- Source: CricInfo, 19 April 2007

Stewart Paul Heaney (born 17 October 1980) is a Canadian cricketer who played in three One Day Internationals/

He has also played cricket for the Australian Capital Territory.
