= Dawid Botha =

Namibian cricketer (born 1988)

Personal information
- Full name: Dawid Hercules Botha
- Born: 1 July 1988 (age 38); Windhoek, Khomas Region, Namibia
- Batting: Right-handed

International information
- National side: Namibia

Domestic team information
- Years: Team
- 2006/07–2007/08: Namibia

Career statistics
Competition	First-class	List A
Matches	11	11
Runs scored	587	242
Batting average	29.35	24.20
100s/50s	2/2	–/3
Top score	120	58
Balls bowled	12	–
Wickets	–	–
Bowling average	–	–
5 wickets in innings	–	–
10 wickets in match	–	–
Best bowling	–	–
Catches/stumpings	13/–	4/–
- Source: CricketArchive (subscription required), 16 October 2011

Dawid Hercules Botha (born 1 July 1988) is a Namibian cricketer, who has played for Namibia's national cricket team. He is a right-handed batsman. He has represented Namibia's national team in first-class cricket since 2006. He had previously represented the Namibia Under-19s.

Botha was born in Windhoek. He represented Namibia during the 2006 Under-19s World Cup. Botha was part of the Namibian Under-19 team which won the Under-19 African Championship in 2007. He made his first-class cricket debut on 11 May 2006, for Namibia against Scotland in the 2006–07 ICC Intercontinental Cup.
