= Louis Burger =

Namibian cricketer (born 1978)

Personal information
- Full name: Louis Jacobus Burger
- Born: 12 March 1978 (age 48); Windhoek, South West Africa
- Batting: Right-handed
- Bowling: Right-arm medium
- Role: All-rounder
- Relatives: Sarel Burger (brother)

International information
- National side: Namibia (2001–2010)
- ODI debut (cap 2): 10 February 2003 v Zimbabwe
- Last ODI: 3 March 2003 v Netherlands

Career statistics
Competition	ODI	FC	LA
Matches	6	31	53
Runs scored	11	1,316	904
Batting average	2.20	26.85	19.23
100s/50s	0/0	3/6	0/5
Top score	5	125	69
Balls bowled	330	1,184	1,238
Wickets	6	19	28
Bowling average	49.50	33.42	36.75
5 wickets in innings	0	0	0
10 wickets in match	0	0	0
Best bowling	3/39	3/15	3/39
Catches/stumpings	6/–	18/–	24/–
- Source: ESPNcricinfo, 22 June 2017

Louis Jacobus Burger (born 12 March 1978) is a Namibian cricketer, who has played for Namibia's national cricket team. He is a right-handed batsman and a right-arm medium-pace bowler.

He participated in List A cricket between 2001 and 2005 and made six One Day International appearances in the World Cup in 2003. His brother Sarel Burger played for Namibia in the World Cup, while Bernie Burger has played in the ICC Trophy.

In the latter part of 2006, Louis Burger hit two centuries, the first of his career in October against Limpopo, and the second, a career-topping high of 120 against the United Arab Emirates in December.
