= ICC Intercontinental Cup =

First-class cricket tournament

- Administrator: International Cricket Council
- Format: First-class cricket
- First edition: 2004
- Latest edition: 2015–17
- Tournament format: Round-robin and knockout
- Number of teams: Varies (Highest 14) (Recently 8)
- Current champion: Afghanistan (2nd title)
- Most successful: Ireland (4 titles)
- Most runs: (Kenya) Steve Tikolo (1,918)
- Most wickets: (Ireland) Trent Johnston (81)

The ICC Intercontinental Cup was a first-class cricket tournament organised by the International Cricket Council (ICC) as part of its cricket development programme. It was designed to allow Associate Members of the ICC the chance to play first-class cricket matches over four days against teams of similar skill in a competition environment and prepare them for eventual promotion to Test cricket status. First run in 2004, two of the most successful teams in the history of the tournament, Ireland and Afghanistan were promoted to Full Member and Test status, in 2017.

In October 2018, the ICC issued a media release asking for an expression of interest from teams which had competed in previous editions of the tournament. However, since no further news regarding a new edition have emerged since then, the future of the tournament appeared uncertain. In April 2021, the ICC looked at the possibility of multi-day matches between Associate Members with One Day International (ODI) status, and Test teams that were not part of the ICC World Test Championship.

== Tournament history ==
=== 2004 ICC Intercontinental Cup ===
The inaugural ICC Intercontinental Cup was completed on 22 November 2004 when Scotland won the title in Sharjah, United Arab Emirates. Scotland beat Canada by an innings and 84 runs in the final. The competition included 12 teams, divided by geographical region into four groups of three. Each team played the other two teams in its group once each. The top team in each group then progresses to the semi-finals, and the winners of those to the final. In order to encourage competitive play and avoid deadlocks, a point system including bonus points was used.

=== 2005 ICC Intercontinental Cup ===
Hong Kong came in to replace Malaysia, and the Cayman Islands replaced the United States who were ejected from the competition by the ICC because of then ongoing political problems within cricket in the US. The points system was also modified so that teams could score unlimited batting points in the first innings and a maximum of 4 points in the second innings.

The tournament was won by Ireland who defeated Kenya in the final.

=== 2006–07 ICC Intercontinental Cup ===
The tournament was cut from 12 to eight teams, with Hong Kong, the Cayman Islands and Uganda losing the right to participate, while Namibia knocked out Nepal in a play off for the eighth place. The match length was extended from three to four days, and each team was scheduled to play at least three matches. The teams were divided into two groups of four, with each team playing the other once and the top two teams qualifying for the final, and the points system has also been changed: 14 points are now awarded for a win, and six for a first-innings lead. Due to preparations for the 2007 World Cup and the longer tournament, the final was played in May 2007, where Ireland defeated Canada to defend their title.

=== 2007–08 ICC Intercontinental Cup ===
The 2007–08 tournament was played as a single round-robin league of eight teams, so that each team played seven matches. The teams ranked first and second at the end of the pool stage contested the final.

Namibia topped the pool stage but faced a defeat in the final against Ireland in late October in Port Elizabeth, South Africa. Ireland secured their third consecutive Intercontinental Cup victory by remaining unbeaten throughout the competition. They sealed the title by winning three successive crucial away matches in Africa, defeating Namibia twice and Kenya in between.

=== 2009–10 ICC Intercontinental Cup ===
The 2009–10 tournament was expanded to two divisions and 11 teams. Ireland, the Netherlands, Scotland, Canada, Kenya, and Afghanistan played in the top division, joined by Zimbabwe A. Meanwhile, United Arab Emirates, Namibia, Bermuda and Uganda played in the Intercontinental Shield. Afghanistan won their first title, beating Scotland in the final.

=== 2011–13 ICC Intercontinental Cup ===
In December 2010, the ICC announced that the 2011–13 tournament would revert to the 8 team, single division format of the 2007–08 season and that the Intercontinental Shield would be scrapped. The sixth staging of the Cup ran from June 2011 to October 2013. and included the top six associate and affiliate teams with One Day International status (ICC World Cricket League Division 1); Afghanistan, Canada, Ireland, Kenya, Netherlands and Scotland. The remaining two places were allotted to UAE and Namibia who finished in the top two of the ICC Intercontinental Shield and ICC World Cricket League Division 2. Later the ICC Development Committee decided to select the 3rd and 4th placed teams from the ICC World Cricket League Division 2 (Bermuda and Uganda) and two qualifiers to proceed from WCL Division 3 (Hong Kong and Papua New Guinea) bringing the total to 12 teams. A 50-over tournament was run alongside the re-expanded Intercontinental Cup.

The final of the 2011-13 competition was held in December 2013 between Ireland and Afghanistan, with Ireland winning their 4th Intercontinental Cup title.

=== 2015–17 ICC Intercontinental Cup ===
In the wake of changes announced by ICC following its revamp in January 2014 when India, Australia and England Cricket Boards gained more control it was declared that the next winner of the Intercontinental Cup would get an opportunity to play 4 tests (2 home and 2 away) against the bottom ranked test nation and if the associate nation wins that series they would then gain Test status until the next Intercontinental Cup. However, with Ireland and Afghanistan gaining test status in June 2017 the Test challenge was not held. Ireland, Afghanistan, Scotland, United Arab Emirates, Hong Kong, PNG, The Netherlands and Namibia qualified based on the results from 2011–13 ICC World Cricket League Championship, 2014 Cricket World Cup Qualifier and the 2015 ICC World Cricket League Division Two. It ran in parallel with the 2015–17 ICC World Cricket League Championship but with slightly different teams. As Ireland and Afghanistan had qualified for the ICC One-Day International Championship ranking qualification process, they were replaced by Kenya and Nepal in the limited over event; however they continued to play the four-day event. Afghanistan won the tournament after defeating UAE during the final round.

== Team records ==
Overall Record

Year	Winner	Runner-up
2004	Scotland	Canada
2005	Ireland	Kenya
2006–07	Ireland	Canada
2007–08	Ireland	Namibia
2009–10	Afghanistan	Scotland
2011–13	Ireland	Afghanistan
2015–17	Afghanistan	Ireland
TBD		

== Teams' performances ==
An overview of the teams' performances in every Intercontinental Cup:

Team	2004	2005	2006–07	2007–08	2009–10	2011–13	2015–17
Africa
Kenya	SF	RU	GS	3rd	5th	7th	DNC
Namibia	GS	GS	GS	RU	8th	5th	8th
Uganda	GS	GS	DNC	DNC	10th	DNC	DNC
Zimbabwe XI	DNC	DNC	DNC	DNC	3rd	DNC	DNC
Americas
Bermuda	GS	SF	GS	8th	11th	DNC	DNC
Canada	RU	GS	RU	7th	7th	6th	DNC
Cayman Islands	DNC	GS	DNC	DNC	DNC	DNC	DNC
United States	GS	DNC	DNC	DNC	DNC	DNC	DNC
Asia
Afghanistan	DNC	DNC	DNC	DNC	W	RU	W
Hong Kong	DNC	GS	DNC	DNC	DNC	DNC	4th
Malaysia	GS	DNC	DNC	DNC	DNC	DNC	DNC
Nepal	GS	GS	PO	DNC	DNC	DNC	DNC
United Arab Emirates	SF	SF	GS	6th	9th	4th	5th
East Asia - Pacific
Papua New Guinea	DNC	DNC	DNC	DNC	DNC	DNC	7th
Europe
Ireland	GS	W	W	W	4th	W	RU
Netherlands	GS	GS	GS	5th	6th	8th	3rd
Scotland	W	GS	GS	4th	RU	3rd	6th

== All time table ==
The abandoned match between Scotland and Kenya in 2008, the forfeited match between Zimbabwe and Scotland in 2010 and the abandoned match between Hong Kong and Scotland in 2016 are not included. Complete up to the end of 2017.

Team	TP	TW	M	W	L	D	Win%
Ireland	7	4	39	25	3	11	64.1%
Scotland	7	1	33	11	8	14	33.3%
Netherlands	7		33	7	16	10	21.2%
Namibia	6		34	15	14	5	44.1%
Kenya	6		28	9	12	7	32.1%
United Arab Emirates	6		34	9	14	11	26.5%
Canada	6		29	6	18	5	20.7%
Bermuda	4		15	3	11	4	16.7%
Afghanistan	3	2	22	17	1	4	77.3%
Nepal	2		5	2	0	3	40.0%
Uganda	2		7	2	4	1	28.6%
Hong Kong	2		8	2	4	2	25.0%
Zimbabwe XI	1		5	3	0	2	60.0%
United States	1		2	1	1	0	50.0%
Papua New Guinea	1		7	2	4	1	28.6%
Malaysia	1		2	0	2	0	0.0%
Cayman Islands	1		2	0	2	0	0.0%

Key: TP/TW=Tournaments participated/won, M=Matches played, W/L/D=wins/losses/draws, Win%=percentage of games won.

Intercontinental Shield Record

Year	Winner	Runner-up
2009–10	Namibia	United Arab Emirates

In 2009 a second competition, the Intercontinental Shield, was introduced for the four teams placing 7th through 10th in the 2009 World Cup Qualifier. The matches are also first-class and the rules and points system are the same as for the Intercontinental Cup. The current teams in the Intercontinental Shield are Bermuda, Namibia, Uganda and United Arab Emirates. In December 2010 after the end of the Intercontinental Shield the ICC announced that it would be scrapping the Shield competition and returning to the 8 team Intercontinental Cup format of the 2007–08 season.

Complete up to the 2010 final between the UAE and Namibia.

Team	TP	TW	M	W	L	D	Win%
Namibia	1	1	4	3	1	0	75.0%
United Arab Emirates	1		4	2	1	1	62.5%
Uganda	1		3	1	1	1	50.0%
Bermuda	1		3	0	3	0	0.0%

Key: TP/TW=Tournaments participated/won, M=Matches played, W/L/D=wins/losses/draws, Win%=percentage of games won, a draw counts as half of a win.

== Records and statistics ==
=== Team records ===
Highest totals

Team	Total	Opponent	Year
Namibia	630/7	Kenya	2012
Bermuda	620	Netherlands	2006
Namibia	609	Uganda	2010
Zimbabwe XI	590	Ireland	2010
Ireland	589/7	UAE	2013

Source: ESPNcricinfo. Last updated 3 June 2015.

Lowest totals

Team	Total	Opponent	Year
Bermuda	56	UAE	2010
Ireland	69	Namibia	2008
Ireland	75	Kenya	2012
UAE	76	Nepal	2005
Canada	79	Scotland	2008
UAE	79	Namibia	2010

Source: ESPNcricinfo. Last updated 3 June 2015.

Largest winning margins (by Innings)

Team	Margin	Opponent	Year
Canada	innings and 228 runs	UAE	2007
Namibia	innings and 185 runs	Bermuda	2010
Afghanistan	innings and 173 runs	Hong Kong	2017
Afghanistan	innings and 172 runs	Ireland	2017
Ireland	innings and 170 runs	UAE	2007

Source: ESPNcricinfo. Last updated 3 June 2015.

Largest winning margins (by Runs)

Team	Margin	Opponent	Year
Ireland	279 runs	Netherlands	2013
Hong Kong	276 runs	United Arab Emirates	2015
United Arab Emirates	266 runs	Kenya	2011
Kenya	247 runs	Canada	2009
Netherlands	231 runs	Namibia	2017

Source: ESPNcricinfo. Last updated 3 June 2015.

Largest winning margins (by Wickets)

Team	Margin	Opponent	Year
Namibia	10 wickets	Uganda	2010
Afghanistan	10 wickets	Namibia	2013
Afghanistan	10 wickets	United Arab Emirates	2017
Afghanistan	9 wickets	Canada	2011
Canada	9 wickets	Bermuda	2006
Ireland	9 wickets	United Arab Emirates	2008
Ireland	9 wickets	Namibia	2008
Kenya	9 wickets	Canada	2007
Nepal	9 wickets	Malaysia	2004
United Arab Emirates	9 wickets	Bermuda	2010
United Arab Emirates	9 wickets	Namibia	2013
United Arab Emirates	9 wickets	Papua New Guinea	2017

Source: ESPNcricinfo. Last updated 22 March 2018.

=== Individual records ===
Most runs

Player	Team	Span	Mat	Inns	Runs	Avg	Highest	100s	50s
Steve Tikolo	Kenya	2004–2010	19	32	1,918	63.93	220	6	7
Arshad Ali	UAE	2004–2013	24	46	1,756	39.90	185	4	9
William Porterfield	Ireland	2006–2017	24	39	1,743	47.10	186	5	8
Khurram Khan	UAE	2004–2015	24	43	1,730	43.25	121*	4	10
Saqib Ali	UAE	2006–2015	18	34	1,620	54.00	195	6	6

Source: ESPNcricinfo. Last updated 27 October 2015.

Highest scores

Player	Score	Team	Opponent	Year
Ryan ten Doeschate	259*	Netherlands	Canada	2006
David Hemp	247*	Bermuda	Netherlands	2006
Ed Joyce	231	Ireland	UAE	2015
Gerrie Snyman	230	Namibia	Kenya	2008
Steve Tikolo	220	Kenya	Bermuda	2005

Source: ESPNcricinfo. Last updated 3 June 2015.

Highest partnerships

No.	Runs	Players	For	Against	Year
1st	374	Raymond van Schoor & Ewald Steenkamp	Namibia	Bermuda	2010
2nd	326	William Porterfield & Ed Joyce	Ireland	Namibia	2015
3rd	360	Eoin Morgan & Andre Botha	Ireland	UAE	2007
4th	267	Steve Tikolo & Hitesh Modi	Kenya	Ireland	2005
5th	214*	Kevin O'Brien & Andrew White	Ireland	Kenya	2008
6th	288*	Ben Cooper & Pieter Seelaar	Netherlands	Hong Kong	2017
7th	219	David Hemp & Saleem Mukuddem	Bermuda	Netherlands	2006
8th	161	Vusi Sibanda & Regis Chakabva	Zimbabwe XI	Kenya	2009
9th	180	Sunil Dhaniram & Kevin Sandher	Canada	UAE	2007
10th	71	Khurram Chohan & Hiral Patel	Canada	Afghanistan	2010

Source: ESPNcricinfo. Last updated 22 March 2018.

Most wickets

Player	Team	Span	Mat	Overs	Wkts	Avg	Best	5	10
Trent Johnston	Ireland	2004–2013	25	577.1	91	16.35	6/23	3	0
Umar Bhatti	Canada	2004–2010	18	491.0	78	20.56	8/40	7	2
Hiren Varaiya	Kenya	2006–2013	18	566.4	77	21.66	6/22	7	2
Louis Klazinga	Namibia	2006–2013	18	491.4	74	21.14	5/20	3	0
Dwayne Leverock	Bermuda	2004–2008	15	685.5	71	26.47	7/57	6	2

Source: ESPNcricinfo. Last updated 3 June 2015.

Best bowling figures

Player	Figures	Team	Opponent	Year
Ali Asad	9/74	UAE	Nepal	2004
John Davison	9/76	Canada	United States	2004
Ian van Zyl	8/34	Namibia	Ireland	2006
Umar Bhatti	8/40	Canada	Bermuda	2005
John Davison	8/61	Canada	United States	2004

Source: ESPNcricinfo. Last updated 3 June 2015.
