= Mohammad Iqbal (Canadian cricketer) =

Pakistani-Canadian cricketer (born 1973)

Personal information
- Full name: Mohammad Iqbal Butt (Note: Note that CricketArchive maintains two profiles for Iqbal. One gives the details of his domestic career in Pakistan and the other his playing career in Canada.)
- Born: 31 December 1973 (age 52); Lahore, Punjab, Pakistan
- Batting: Right-handed
- Bowling: Right-arm fast-medium
- Role: Batsman

International information
- National side: Canada (2007-2008)
- ODI debut (cap 51): 18 October 2007 v Kenya
- Last ODI: 24 August 2008 v West Indies
- T20I debut (cap 17): 10 October 2008 v Pakistan
- Last T20I: 12 October 2008 v Sri Lanka

Domestic team information
- Years: Team
- 1988/89–1993/94: Rawalpindi

Career statistics
Competition	ODI	T20I	FC	LA
Matches	5	3	19	17
Runs scored	54	27	534	242
Batting average	10.80	9.00	18.41	17.28
100s/50s	0/0	0/0	1/2	0/2
Top score	30	22	140	55
Catches/stumpings	0/–	0/–	6/–	4/–
- Source: Cricinfo, 28 April 2020

Mohammad Iqbal (born December 31, 1973) is a Pakistani born Canadian cricketer.

Iqbal began his career playing for Rawalpindi. in Pakistan. A right-handed opening for batsman, he scored a century in his maiden first-class innings for Canada against Namibia i in 2007, followed by 88 in the second innings
