= Shahul Hameed (umpire) =

Indonesian cricket umpire

Personal information
- Full name: Moideen Shahul Hameed
- Born: 26 November 1970 (age 55); Coimbatore, India
- Role: Umpire

Umpiring information
- ODIs umpired: 10 (2006–2007)
- WODIs umpired: 8 (2009–2013)
- FC umpired: 6 (2006–2012)
- LA umpired: 17 (2005–2007)
- Source: CricketArchive, 13 February 2014

Moideen Shahul Hameed (born 26 November 1970) is an Indian cricket umpire representing Indonesia in international cricket. At the international level, he stood in ten One Day International matches in 2006 and 2007. He was a member of the International Cricket Council (ICC) Associate and Affiliate Panel of Umpires from 2006 until 2014.

== See also ==
- List of One Day International cricket umpires
