= Bernie Burger =

South African-born Namibian cricketer

Personal information
- Full name: Kola Bernie Burger
- Born: 5 May 1981 (age 45); Cape Town, Cape Province, South Africa
- Batting: Right-handed
- Bowling: Left-arm medium

Domestic team information
- Years: Team
- 2006/07–: Namibia

Career statistics
Competition	FC	LA	T20
Matches	30	37	3
Runs scored	640	471	1
Batting average	15.60	21.40	–
100s/50s	0/1	1/3	0/0
Top score	76	100	1*
Balls bowled	5,007	1,690	60
Wickets	109	50	3
Bowling average	22.53	25.14	30.00
5 wickets in innings	8	1	0
10 wickets in match	1	0	0
Best bowling	7/38	5/25	2/28
Catches/stumpings	12/–	5/–	0/–
- Source: CricketArchive, 16 October 2011

Kola Bernie Burger (born 5 May 1981) is a South African-born Namibian cricketer, who has played for Namibia's national cricket team. He is a right-handed batsman and a left-arm medium-pace bowler.

He played with the Namibian cricket team during the 2005 ICC Trophy in Ireland in which they finished seventh. Generally speaking, Burger occupies the position of lower-middle-order batsman, contributing along with Ian van Zyl to a solid bowling attack.

In January 2008, Burger hit a career-best 74 in the ICC Inter-Continental Cup competition against the United Arab Emirates, and the following month, he hit his debut century, an innings of 100 in 57 balls, including seven fours and six sixes.
