= Gayan Silva =

Sri-Lankan born cricketer (born 1974)

Personal information
- Full name: Hendahewa Sanjeewa Gayan Sameera Silva
- Born: 14 January 1974 (age 52); Balapitiya, Sri Lanka
- Batting: Left-handed
- Bowling: Right-arm medium-fast
- Role: Wicket-keeper

Domestic team information
- Years: Team
- 1993–2001: Singha Sports Club
- 1993–1995: Ruhuna
- 1999–2000: Police Sports Club
- FC debut: 8 January 1993 Singha Sports Club v Moors Sports Club

Career statistics
Competition	First-class	List A
Matches	93	18
Runs scored	3,255	282
Batting average	20.73	17.62
100s/50s	0/16	0/0
Top score	95	46
Catches/stumpings	103/16	7/3
- Source: CricInfo, 15 August 2009

Hendahewage Sanjeewa Gayan Sameera Silva (born 14 January 1974), known as Gayan Silva, is a former Sri Lankan-born international cricketer who represented the United Arab Emirates national team. A left-handed batsman and wicket keeper, and very occasional right-arm medium-fast bowler, Silva played club cricket for the local Police Sports Club and particularly Singha Sports Club. He has scored over 3,200 first class runs, but has not yet scored higher than 95, and has also played a handful of one day games, including matches against Scotland.

== Early life ==
Silva war born in January 1974, in Balapitiya.

== Career ==
=== First class cricket ===
Silva made his debut in 1993 for Singha Sports Club, playing Moors Sports Club on 8 January. He would go on to play 74 matches for Singha Sports Club, averaging 21.41, scoring 2,656 runs with a best of 95. On 11 January 2007, Silva played a first class match for UAE against Scotland, scoring 60 in a 140 run partnership with Saqib Ali. He then scored a second half-century, reaching 87. The match, however, ended in a draw. On 8 November 2007, UAE faced Bermuda, opening the batting and scoring 17 and four. Forming two solid opening partnerships, however UAE suffered batting collapses after his wicket was lost in both innings.

=== One day cricket ===
Silva played his first one-day match in 1998, facing the Moors Sports Club on 3 December. He opened the batting and made 46. Silva played a total of six matches for the Police Sports Club, the Singha Sports Club and the UAE respectively, averaging 3.50, 22.00 and 25.40 respectively.
