= Glenn Rogers =

Australian cricketer (born 1977)

Personal information
- Full name: Glenn Alan Rogers
- Born: 12 April 1977 (age 49); Sydney, New South Wales, Australia
- Batting: Right-handed
- Bowling: Slow left-arm orthodox

International information
- National side: Scotland
- ODI debut (cap 27): 15 December 2006 v Bangladesh
- Last ODI: 29 July 2008 v Netherlands
- T20I debut (cap 16): 2 August 2008 v Ireland
- Last T20I: 7 June 2009 v South Africa

Career statistics
| Competition | ODI | T20I | FC | LA |
|---|---|---|---|---|
| Matches | 13 | 2 | 2 | 30 |
| Runs scored | 81 | 7 | 20 | 200 |
| Batting average | 16.20 | – | 6.66 | 13.33 |
| 100s/50s | 0/0 | 0/0 | 0/0 | 0/0 |
| Top score | 26 | 6* | 13 | 26 |
| Balls bowled | 512 | 47 | 379 | 1,288 |
| Wickets | 8 | 2 | 6 | 20 |
| Bowling average | 51.12 | 33.50 | 28.83 | 51.80 |
| 5 wickets in innings | 0 | 0 | 0 | 0 |
| 10 wickets in match | 0 | 0 | 0 | 0 |
| Best bowling | 2/22 | 2/15 | 4/72 | 2/20 |
| Catches/stumpings | 2/– | 0/– | 3/– | 9/– |
- Source: Cricinfo, 25 January 2025

Glenn Alan Rogers (born 12 April 1977) is an Australian-born former cricketer who played international cricket for Scotland. A slow left-arm orthodox bowler, his ODI debut was in Chittagong against Bangladesh in December 2006.

Rogers was the top scorer for Scotland when it was defeated by Holland in Group A of the 2007 Cricket World Cup.
