= Niels Bagh =

Danish cricket umpire

Personal information
- Full name: Niels Gunnar Bagh
- Born: 9 March 1961 (age 65); Næstved, Denmark

Umpiring information
- ODIs umpired: 14 (2008–2011)
- T20Is umpired: 5 (2008–2008)
- Source: CricketArchive, 18 January 2011

Niels Gunnar Bagh (born 9 March 1961) is a Danish cricket umpire who serves on the ICC Associate and Affiliate International Umpires panel. Bagh first officiated a match of note in 2001 when Staffordshire played the Worcestershire Cricket Board in a List A match in the Cheltenham & Gloucester Trophy. Four years later, Bagh stood in his maiden first-class fixture, between the Netherlands and Scotland in the 2005 Intercontinental Cup. From 2005 to 2010, Bagh stood in 12 further Intercontinental Cup matches.

After standing in his first List A match in 2001, he had to wait until the 2007 ICC World Cricket League Division Two to stand in his next, as Uganda played the UAE. In total, Bagh has stood as an umpire in 25 List A matches. Some of these matches have also had One Day International (ODI) status. Bagh first stood in an ODI in August 2008 when the Netherlands played Bermuda. From 2008 to 2010, he umpired in 14 ODIs.

Bagh has also officiated in 5 Twenty20 Internationals, all of them during the 2008 ICC World Twenty20 Qualifier in Belfast. His first T20I as an umpire saw Canada play the Netherlands and his final T20I as an umpire saw Bermuda play Canada.

== See also ==
- List of One Day International cricket umpires
- List of Twenty20 International cricket umpires
