= Neil MacRae =

Scottish cricketer (born 1972)

Personal information
- Born: 25 March 1972 (age 54); Liverpool, England
- Batting: Right-handed

Career statistics
Competition	ODI	FC	LA
Matches	2	6	17
Runs scored	10	219	255
Batting average	5.00	21.90	19.61
100s/50s	0/0	0/1	0/1
Top score	8	51	83
Catches/stumpings	0/0	2/0	0/0
- Source: CricketArchive, 14 June 2013

Neil John MacRae (born 25 March 1972) is a Scottish international cricketer who played two One Day Internationals in 2006. He has also played in first-class and List A cricket matches for Scotland.

MacRae was born at Liverpool. He was appointed head coach of the Jersey national cricket team in November 2013 (with his contract beginning in January 2014), with an additional role as high performance coach with the Jersey Cricket Board.

He was announced as national coach of the Dutch women's team on 24 January 2024.

McRae rejoined Jersey as the islands' director of cricket and men's team head coach on 10 December 2025.
