= Ross Lyons =

Scottish cricketer (born 1984)

Personal information
- Full name: Ross Thomas Lyons
- Born: 8 December 1984 (age 41); Greenock, Renfrewshire, Scotland
- Batting: Left-handed
- Bowling: Slow left-arm orthodox

International information
- National side: Scotland
- ODI debut (cap 16): 27 June 2006 v Pakistan
- Last ODI: 17 August 2010 v Afghanistan
- T20I debut (cap 20): 1 February 2010 v Kenya
- Last T20I: 11 February 2010 v Ireland

Domestic team information
- Years: Team
- 2005–2010: Scotland

Career statistics
Competition	ODI	T20I	FC	LA
Matches	25	2	8	51
Runs scored	90	4	66	152
Batting average	22.50	2.00	22.00	11.69
100s/50s	0/0	0/0	0/0	0/0
Top score	28	4	23	28
Balls bowled	1,093	78	974	2,165
Wickets	20	5	24	38
Bowling average	45.05	18.00	19.91	47.71
5 wickets in innings	0	0	0	0
10 wickets in match	0	0	0	0
Best bowling	3/21	3/28	4/10	3/21
Catches/stumpings	4/–	1/–	7/–	13/–
- Source: Cricinfo, 6 January 2010

Ross Thomas Lyons (born 8 December 1984) is a Scottish cricket player. He is a left-handed batsman and a slow left-arm orthodox spin bowler. He made his first-class cricket debut on 11 May 2006, for Scotland against Namibia in the 2006–07 ICC Intercontinental Cup.

He made his debut for the Scottish national team on 26 August 2005 in a totesport league match against Derbyshire. He has played 61 times for Scotland in all formats, including 25 One Day Internationals, his first match at that level coming on 27 June 2006 against Pakistan. He has also represented Scotland at Under-15, Under-17, Under-19 and Under-23 level. He played for SNCL Club East Kilbride bowling slow left arm spin and batting around the middle order, and was their player of the year 2016–17. Lyons then signed for his current club, Uddingston, in April 2017.
