= Qaiser Ali =

Canadian cricketer (born 1978)

Cricket information
- Batting: Right-handed
- Bowling: Right-arm off spin

Career statistics
Competition	ODI	First-class
Matches	12	5
Runs scored	195	476
Batting average	17.72	68.00
100s/50s	0/2	1/3
Top score	70	174
Balls bowled	26	66
Wickets	0	1
Bowling average	–	40
5 wickets in innings	–	0
10 wickets in match	–	0
Best bowling	–	1/14
Catches/stumpings	2/–	3/–
- Source: Cricinfo

Qaiser Ali (born 28 December 1978) is a Canadian cricketer. He played one ListA match for karachi B in his native Pakistan in 1995 but moved to Canada later in life.

He made his debut for Canada in the ICC Intercontinental Cup against Bermuda, and has played four matches in the competition in all. He also played two One Day Internationals against Kenya in August 2006.
