= Ian van Zyl =

Namibian cricketer (born 1980)

Personal information
- Full name: Matheus Christiaan van Zyl
- Born: 6 April 1980 (age 46); Grootfontein, Otjozondjupa Region, Namibia
- Batting: Right-handed
- Bowling: Right-arm medium-fast
- Role: Occasional wicket-keeper

International information
- National side: Namibia

Domestic team information
- Years: Team
- 2006/07–2008/09: Namibia

Career statistics
Competition	First-class	List A
Matches	16	24
Runs scored	326	221
Batting average	20.37	22.10
100s/50s	–/1	–/–
Top score	50	48
Balls bowled	1,727	825
Wickets	32	23
Bowling average	35.06	33.73
5 wickets in innings	1	–
10 wickets in match	–	–
Best bowling	8/34	4/17
Catches/stumpings	11/1	9/–
- Source: CricketArchive, 16 October 2011

Matheus Christiaan van Zyl, known as Ian van Zyl (born 6 April 1980, in Grootfontein, Otjozondjupa Region), is a Namibian cricketer. He made his first-class debut for the Namibian team against Uganda in the 2005 ICC Intercontinental Cup. In the same competition the following year, he took 8–34 against Ireland, albeit in a losing cause. van Zyl also appeared in the 2005 ICC Trophy.
