= Roger Dill =

Bermudian cricket umpire (born 1957)

Personal information
- Full name: Roger Dill
- Born: 5 July 1957 (age 69); Bermuda

Umpiring information
- ODIs umpired: 25 (2006–2008)
- Source: Cricinfo, 29 June 2018

Roger Dill (born 5 July 1957) is an international cricket umpire from Bermuda.

He became the first umpire from the ICC Associates panel to officiate in a full One Day Internationals (ODIs) in May 2006, during the triangular series played by Bermuda, Canada and Zimbabwe. He has officiated in 25 ODIs.

Dill is also a sergeant in the Bermudian fire brigade.

== See also ==
- List of One Day International cricket umpires
