= Neil McCallum (cricketer) =

Scottish cricketer

Personal information
- Full name: Neil Francis Ian McCallum
- Born: 22 November 1977 (age 48); Edinburgh, Midlothian, Scotland
- Batting: Right-handed

International information
- National side: Scotland
- ODI debut (cap 18): 27 June 2006 v Pakistan
- Last ODI: 10 July 2010 v Ireland
- T20I debut (cap 5): 12 September 2007 v Pakistan
- Last T20I: 11 February 2010 v Ireland

Career statistics
Competition	ODI	T20I	FC	LA
Matches	43	11	14	90
Runs scored	1,002	76	714	1,890
Batting average	27.83	10.85	44.62	24.54
100s/50s	2/4	0/0	3/1	4/9
Top score	121*	38	181	121*
Catches/stumpings	13/–	0/–	14/–	32/–
- Source: Cricinfo, 14 August 2011

Neil Francis Ian McCallum (born 22 November 1977) is a Scottish cricketer. He made his first-class cricket debut on 11 May 2006, for Scotland against Namibia in the 2006–07 ICC Intercontinental Cup.

He is a right-handed batsman. He made his debut for Scotland on 4 July 2000 against an England Amateur team. McCallum has since represented Scotland in One Day International (ODI) matches, his first match at this level coming against Pakistan in June 2006. On 29 January 2007, he scored an unbeaten 102 as Scotland defeated Ireland in Nairobi. He became the second Scottish cricketer to score an ODI century after Ryan Watson. He along with Ryan Watson set the record for the highest ever partnership for any wicket in ODI history as debutants (118 for the 5th wicket). This is also the only stand in ODI history that two new debutants had a 100+ runs stand for any wicket in ODI cricket. He was also nominated for Scotland's batsman of the year awards in 2006/2007. He also played cricket for Edinburgh-based Grange Cricket Club, appearing regularly for their first XIs, as a top order batsman. He currently works as a PE teacher at George Watson's College in Edinburgh, which he also attended as a pupil.

He holds the joint record with Kapil Dev for facing the most balls when batting at number six position in an ODI innings (138).
