= Ryan Watson (cricketer) =

Scottish cricketer (born 1976)

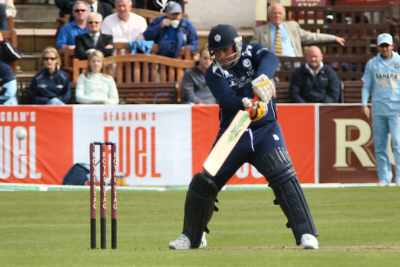

Personal information
- Full name: Ryan Robert Watson
- Born: 12 November 1976 (age 50); Salisbury, Rhodesia
- Batting: Right-handed
- Bowling: Right arm medium
- Role: Batsman

International information
- National side: Scotland (2006–2009)
- ODI debut (cap 21): 27 June 2006 v Pakistan
- Last ODI: 28 August 2009 v Australia
- T20I debut (cap 9): 12 September 2007 v Pakistan
- Last T20I: 7 June 2009 v South Africa

Career statistics
Competition	ODI	T20I	FC	LA
Matches	35	10	15	143
Runs scored	956	159	843	3,371
Batting average	30.83	17.66	38.31	26.33
100s/50s	1/6	0/1	2/4	3/18
Top score	123*	54	167	123*
Balls bowled	570	60	842	3,527
Wickets	12	3	19	81
Bowling average	44.00	30.66	23.94	38.44
5 wickets in innings	0	0	1	0
10 wickets in match	0	0	0	0
Best bowling	3/18	1/4	5/74	4/24
Catches/stumpings	11/–	4/–	19/–	56/–
- Source: CricketArchive, 7 October 2017

Ryan Robert Watson (born 12 November 1976) is a Zimbabwean-born Scottish cricketer who played limited over internationals and captained Scotland. He currently plays club cricket with Forfarshire. Watson is a hard hitting right-handed batsman and is able to bowl both medium-fast and off-break deliveries. He hit the headlines in 2003 when he hit a century off just 43 balls in a game against Somerset at The Grange, Edinburgh. In 2008, he became one of the first three players to be awarded a contract with Cricket Scotland.

== Early days ==
Watson was previously on the coaching staff of Potchefstroom Boys High in South Africa. He decided at the age of 23 to leave South Africa permanently in an attempt to qualify to play for Scotland under residency rules. His early career in Scotland was at Meigle C.C. where he first played as an overseas professional aged 17. A move to Falkland cricket club in Fife for better terms followed, before later moving to Forfarshire CC. His father, Larry, played cricket for Rhodesia (now Zimbabwe).

== International career ==
Watson made his ODI debut on 27 June 2006 against Pakistan at Edinburgh and had to step in at the last minute as captain. With Scotland struggling at 4/20, Watson led from the front by scoring 80 off 85 balls on his debut. In that same match he along with Neil McCallum set the world record for the highest ever ODI partnership by two debutants in ODI history for any wicket (they put on a 118 runstand for the 5th wicket. In fact this is the only 100+ partnership in ODI history by 2 debutants in history) In January 2007 he hit a match-winning 117 not out against Canada as they successfully chased 293 in a One Day International at Mombasa. It was the first ever century for Scotland in ODI cricket.

He had a largely disappointing Cricket World Cup in 2007 although he had the privilege of captaining his side for their second group match against South Africa. The opposing captain was his ex King Edward VII School mate Graeme Smith. After the tournament Watson was given the job full-time, replacing Craig Wright as captain.

Until 2008, the Scotland cricket team was made up of amateurs, players did not have contracts with the game's governing body in the country, Cricket Scotland, and balanced their sports careers with full-time jobs. Cricket Scotland began professionalising the national team in 2008 with the introduction of contracts for three of its players. Watson was one of the three along with fast-bowlers Gordon Goudie and Dewald Nel. A year later Watson turned down a contract extension with Cricket Scotland to pursue employment outside cricket.

== Retirement ==
At the end of the 2011 season, Watson announced he was retiring from all forms of cricket. During his career, Watson scored over 5,000 runs for his country and shares the accolade of a record 194 caps with former teammate Craig Wright who said "Ryan has been one of the most influential batsmen for Scotland in the last 10 years with numerous match winning innings for us". Ryan also retired as the most prolific run scorer in the Cricket Scotland League (CSL) history.

== Comeback ==
On 19 April 2012 it was announced that Watson would be delaying his retirement after playing several matches during the 2012 season for Glenrothes Cricket Club.

Watson played an important part in the 2012 play-offs and helped Glenrothes CC gain promotion to the Cricket Scotland League (CSL) for the first time in their history. At the end of 2012 season Watson confirmed he would continue playing for Glenrothes CC in the Cricket Scotland League (CSL) for the 2013 season as well as take a more active role in coaching at the club.
