= Umar Bhatti =

Pakistani-born Canadian cricketer

Personal information
- Born: 4 January 1984 (age 42); Lahore, Punjab, Pakistan
- Batting: Left-handed
- Bowling: Left-arm medium

International information
- National side: Canada (2006–2010)
- ODI debut (cap 30): 16 May 2006 v Zimbabwe
- Last ODI: 7 September 2010 v Ireland
- T20I debut (cap 15): 10 October 2008 v Pakistan
- Last T20I: 10 February 2010 v Kenya

Career statistics
Competition	ODI	T20I	FC	LA
Matches	36	7	18	52
Runs scored	378	49	505	534
Batting average	17.18	12.25	21.95	19.07
100s/50s	0/0	0/0	0/3	0/1
Top score	46	12	83*	51
Balls bowled	1,630	138	2,946	2,243
Wickets	33	8	78	49
Bowling average	34.81	18.50	20.56	32.63
5 wickets in innings	0	0	7	0
10 wickets in match	0	0	2	0
Best bowling	4/35	3/32	8/40	4/45
Catches/stumpings	5/–	0/–	4/–	8/–
- Source: Cricinfo, 5 January 2010

Umar Bhatti (born 4 January 1984) is a Pakistani-born Canadian cricketer. He was born in the province of Punjab in the city of Lahore. He is a left-handed batsman and a left-arm medium-pace bowler.

Bhatti first played for Canada in the Under-19s World Cup of 2004, where he finished 30 not out in his debut World Cup performance, batting at number seven. He played in six games in the World Cup, generally batting in the lower-middle order. He participated in the Under-19s World Cup 2004 as a skipper. He later performed for his adopted country in the 2005 ICC Trophy, which saw Canada finish in fourth place in the tournament, which took place in Ireland. Bhatti made his one-day international debut against Zimbabwe in 2006 and his T20 international debut against Pakistan in 2008. He played 36 one day internationals in which he scored 378 runs at an average of 17.18 and his highest score was 46, he also took 33 wickets at an average of 34.81 and economy rate of 4.22. He also played 7 T20 internationals where he scored 49 runs at an average of 12.25 and his highest score was 12 and also took 8 wickets at an average of 19.50 with an economy rate of 6.43.

In the final of the 2006 ICC Intercontinental Cup, a match which actually took place in May 2007, Bhatti took four wickets in five balls against Ireland, including a hat-trick that was made up entirely of lbw decisions.
