= Bermudian cricket team in Kenya in 2006–07 =

Bermudians in Kenya in 2006–07
	Bermuda	Kenya
- Dates: 5 November – 14 November 2006
Captains	Irving Romaine	Steve Tikolo

One Day International series
- Results: Kenya won the 3-match series 3–0
Most runs	Dean Minors; 108	Steve Tikolo; 214
Most wickets	Dwayne Leverock; 7	Thomas Odoyo; 7
- Player of the series: Steve Tikolo

The Bermudian cricket team toured Kenya during the 2006–07 season. The 5–14 November 2006 tour began with a drawn Intercontinental Cup match, followed by a 3-ODI series which was won comprehensively by Kenya 3–0. It was a must win for both teams, as the World Cup was only four months away, and this series would give the selectors an opportunity to figure out the squad to send to the World Cup. Kenya left with a good indication as to what their team was, but Bermuda left with many more questions than answers.

== Squads ==
Bermuda	Kenya
Irving Romaine (c)	Steve Tikolo (c)
Lionel Cann	James Kamande
Hasan Durham	Tanmay Mishra
David Hemp	Collins Obuya
Kevin Hurdle	David Obuya
Malachi Jones	Nehemiah Odhiambo
Stefan Kelly	Thomas Odoyo
Dwayne Leverock	Peter Ongondo
Dean Minors	Lameck Onyango
Saleem Mukuddem	Morris Ouma (wk)
Steven Outerbridge	Malhar Patel
Clay Smith	Rakep Patel
Ryan Steede	Tony Suji
Rodney Trott	Hiren Varaiya
Janeiro Tucker	
Kwame Tucker (wk)	

== Intercontinental Cup ==
Bermuda
133 (59 overs)

DA Minors 28 (68)
TM Odoyo 5/21 (11)

&
19/2 (16.3 overs)

SD Outerbridge 14 (44)
HA Varaiya 2/1 (2)

Draw

Nairobi Gymkhana Club, Nairobi, Kenya
Umpires: AL Hill (NZL) and BB Pradham (NEP)

Kenya
205 (56.1 overs)

SO Tikolo 66 (93)
S Mukuddem 6/50 (14)

No play was possible on the third or fourth day of the test due to heavy rainfall: match is drawn.

== ODI series ==
=== 1st ODI ===
11 November 2006
(scorecard)

Kenya; 224/8 (50 overs)	v	Bermuda; 145 (45 overs)
DO Obuya 44 (75); S Mukuddem 3/45 (10 overs)		KL Tucker 34 (61); HA Varaiya 3/29 (10 overs)

Kenya won by 79 runs
Mombasa Sports Club Ground, Mombasa, Kenya
Umpires: AL Hill (NZL) and BB Pradham (NEP)
Player of the match: HA Varaiya

=== 2nd ODI ===
12 November 2006
(scorecard)

Bermuda; 184/8 (42 overs)	v	Kenya; 186/3 (37.5 overs)
JJ Tucker 52 (68); TM Odoyo 4/25 (9 overs)		T Mishra 64 (76); S Mukuddem 2/33 (7 overs)

Kenya won by 7 wickets (Duckworth–Lewis method)
Mombasa Sports Club Ground, Mombasa, Kenya
Umpires: AL Hill (NZL) and BB Pradham (NEP)
Player of the match: TM Odoyo

- Match shortened due to rain; Duckworth–Lewis revised target to win: 185 runs from 42 overs for Kenya.

=== 3rd ODI ===
14 November 2006
(scorecard)

Kenya; 305/8 (50 overs)	v	Bermuda; 201/6 (50 overs)
SO Tikolo 111 (98); RDM Leverock 5/53 (10 overs)		DA Minors 68 (91); JK Kamande 3/32 (10 overs)

Kenya won by 104 runs
Mombasa Sports Club Ground, Mombasa, Kenya
Umpires: AL Hill (NZL) and BB Pradham (NEP)
Player of the match: HA Varaiya

== Statistics ==
Statistic	Person	Description
Highest innings score	Steve Tikolo	111
Best strike rate (qualification: 25 runs)	Thomas Odoyo	184.21
Most runs	Steve Tikolo	214
Best innings bowling	Dwayne Leverock	5/53
Best innings economy rate (qualification: 30 balls bowled)	Thomas Odoyo	1.40
Most wickets	Thomas Odoyo, Dwayne Leverock	7
Most dismissals (wicket-keeper)	Kwame Tucker, Morris Ouma	3
Most dismissals (fielder)	Dean Minors, James Kamande	3
