= Bermuda at the Cricket World Cup =

The Bermuda cricket team is the team representing Bermuda in the sport of cricket, governed by the Bermuda Cricket Board. The Bermuda Cricket Board was elected to associate membership of the International Cricket Council, the global ruling body for the sport, in 1966. They finished fourth in 2005 ICC Trophy, thus qualifying for their first and only World Cup in 2007.

== Cricket World Cup Record ==
Cricket World Cup record									Qualification record				
Year	Round	Position	Pld	W	L	T	NR	Captain	Pld	W	L	T	NR
(England) 1975	Did not qualify								No qualifier held				
(England) 1979	Did not qualify								5	3	1	0	1
(England) 1983	Did not qualify								9	7	1	0	1
(India) (Pakistan) 1987	Did not qualify								10	7	3	0	0
(Australia) (New Zealand) 1992	Did not qualify								6	4	2	0	0
(India) (Pakistan) (Sri Lanka) 1996	Did not qualify								9	6	3	0	0
(England) (Scotland) (Republic of Ireland) (Netherlands) 1999	Did not qualify								6	3	2	0	1
(South Africa) (Zimbabwe) (Kenya) 2003	Did not qualify								6	3	3	0	0
(Cricket West Indies) 2007	Group stage	16/16	3	0	3	0	0	Irving Romaine	7	3	3	0	1
(India) (Bangladesh) (Sri Lanka) 2011	Did not qualify								7	3	4	0	0
(Australia) (New Zealand) 2015	Did not qualify								10	4	6	0	0
(England) (Wales) 2019	Did not qualify								10	3	7	0	0
(India) 2023	Did not qualify								15	0	14	0	1
Total	0 Titles	1/13	3	0	3	0	0	—N/a	100	46	49	0	5

=== World Cup Record (By Team) ===
Cricket World Cup matches (By team)
Against	Wins	Draws	Losses	Total
Bangladesh	0	0	1	1
India	0	0	1	1
Sri Lanka	0	0	1	1
Total : 0 Wins – 0 Ties – 3 Losses – 3 games played

== 2007 Cricket World Cup ==
Bermuda qualified for their first Cricket World Cup in 2007, and were drawn against Bangladesh, India and Sri Lanka. They lost all three matches, and failed to qualify for the Knockout stage.

Squad

- Irving Romaine (c)
- Dean Minors (wk)
- Lionel Cann
- David Hemp
- Janeiro Tucker
- Delyone Borden
- Steven Outerbridge
- Stefan Kelly
- Saleem Mukuddem
- Kevin Hurdle
- Malachi Jones
- Dwayne Leverock
- Oliver Pitcher
- Kwame Tucker
- Clay Smith

Results

Group stage (Group B)				Super 8		Semifinal	Final	Overall Result
Opposition Result	Opposition Result	Opposition Result	Rank	Opposition Result	Rank	Opposition Result	Opposition Result	Overall Result
Sri Lanka; L by 243 runs	India; L by 257 runs	Bangladesh; L by 7 wickets (DLS)	4	Did not advance				Group stage

Scorecards

Group stage (Group B)

15 March 2007
14:30 (D/N)
Scorecard

Sri Lanka; 321/6 (50 overs)	v	Bermuda; 78 (24.4 overs)
Mahela Jayawardene 85 (90); Saleem Mukuddem 2/50 (10 overs)		Lionel Cann 28 (32); Farveez Maharoof 4/23 (7 overs)

Sri Lanka won by 243 runs
Queen's Park Oval, Port of Spain
Umpires: Daryl Harper (Aus) and Ian Howell (SA)
Player of the match: Mahela Jayawardene (SL)

- Sri Lanka won the toss and elected to bat.

19 March
Scorecard

India; 413/5 (50 overs)	v	Bermuda; 156 (43.1 overs)
Virender Sehwag 114 (87); Delyone Borden 2/30 (5 overs)		David Hemp 76* (105); Ajit Agarkar 3/38 (10 overs)

India won by 257 runs
Queen's Park Oval, Port of Spain
Umpires: Aleem Dar (Pak) and Ian Howell (SA)
Player of the match: Virender Sehwag (Ind)

- Bermuda won the toss and elected to field.

25 March 2007
scorecard

Bermuda; 94/9 (21 overs)	v	Bangladesh; 96/3 (17.3 overs)
Dean Minors 23 (25); Abdur Razzak 3/20 (4 overs)		Mohammad Ashraful 29* (32); Saleem Mukuddem 3/19 (5 overs)

Bangladesh won by 7 wickets (DLS method)
Queen's Park Oval, Port of Spain
Umpires: Steve Davis (Aus) and Ian Howell (SA)
Player of the match: Mohammad Ashraful (Ban)

- Bangladesh won the toss and elected to field.
- Match reduced to 21 Over due to rain

== Records and statistics ==
=== Team records ===
Highest innings totals

Score	Opponent	Venue	Season
156/10 (43.1 overs)	India	Port of Spain	2007
94/9 (21 overs)	Bangladesh	Port of Spain	2007
78/10 (24.4 overs)	Sri Lanka	Port of Spain	2007
Last updated: 25 March 2007

=== Batting records ===
Most runs

Runs	Player	Mat	Inn	Avg	100s	50s	Period
90	David Hemp	3	3	45.00	—N/a	1	2007–2007
48	Dean Minors	3	3	16.00	—N/a	—N/a	2007–2007
44	Lionel Cann	3	3	14.66	—N/a	—N/a	2007–2007
28	Oliver Pitcher	3	3	9.33	—N/a	—N/a	2007–2007
21	Delyone Borden	3	3	7.00	—N/a	—N/a	2007–2007
Last updated: 25 March 2007

Highest individual innings

Score	Player	Opponent	Venue	Season
76*	David Hemp	India	Port of Spain	2007
28	Lionel Cann	Sri Lanka	Port of Spain	2007
23	Dean Minors	Bangladesh	Port of Spain	2007
22	Oliver Pitcher	Bangladesh	Port of Spain	2007
21	Dean Minors	India	Port of Spain	2007
Last updated: 25 March 2007

Highest partnerships

Runs	Players	Opposition	Venue	Season
44 (9th wicket)	Dwayne Leverock (9) & David Hemp (22)	v India	Port of Spain	2007
43 (6th wicket)	Dean Minors (21) & David Hemp (20)	v India	Port of Spain	2007
29 (3rd wicket)	David Hemp (18) & Delyone Borden (5)	v India	Port of Spain	2007
25 (8th wicket)	Lionel Cann (17) & Delyone Borden (6)	v Sri Lanka	Port of Spain	2007
24 (4th wicket)	Oliver Pitcher (9) & Irving Romaine (11)	v Bangladesh	Port of Spain	2007
Last updated: 25 March 2007

=== Bowling statistics ===
Most wickets

Wickets	Player	Matches	Avg.	Econ.	4W	5W	Period
5	Saleem Mukuddem	2	13.80	4.60	0	0	2007–2007
3	Kevin Hurdle	3	46.33	6.04	0	0	2007–2007
2	Delyone Borden	3	36.00	7.20	0	0	2007–2007
2	Dwayne Leverock	3	91.00	7.74	0	0	2007–2007
1	Malachi Jones	1	74.00	10.57	0	0	2007–2007
1	Lionel Cann	3	88.00	7.33	0	0	2007–2007
Last updated: 25 March 2007

Best bowling figures

Bowling Figures	Overs	Player	Opponent	Venue	Season
3/19	5.0	Saleem Mukuddem	v Bangladesh	Port of Spain	2007
2/30	5.0	Delyone Borden	v India	Port of Spain	2007
2/50	10.0	Saleem Mukuddem	v Sri Lanka	Port of Spain	2007
2/61	9.0	Kevin Hurdle	v Sri Lanka	Port of Spain	2007
1/34	5.0	Lionel Cann	v Sri Lanka	Port of Spain	2007
Last updated: 25 March 2007

== See also ==
- Bermuda national cricket team
- Cricket in Bermuda
