= World Cricket Classic =

Twenty20 World Cricket Classic
- Cricket format: Twenty20
- Host(s): Bermuda
- Champions: South Africa
- Participants: Australia, Bermuda, England, India; New Zealand, South Africa, Sri Lanka, West Indies
- Most runs: (South Africa) Gary Kirsten (255)
- Most wickets: Pieter Strydom, Derek Crookes (7)

The World Cricket Classic was a Twenty20 cricket tournament which took place in Bermuda during April 2006. The participating players were all ex-cricketers with the exception of Bermuda who fielded their current squad. Four centuries were made in the tournament, one from Australian Ryan Campbell and South African Steven Jack, while Jack's opening partner Gary Kirsten passed 100 twice.

== Squads ==
Australia
- Ian Healy (c)
- Greg Blewett
- Ray Bright
- Ryan Campbell
- Rick Darling
- Damien Fleming
- Shaun Graf
- Rodney Hogg
- Wayne Phillips
Bermuda
- Clay Smith (c)
- Delyone Borden
- Lionel Cann
- Hasan Durham
- Kevin Hurdle
- Dwayne Leverock
- Dean Minors
- Daniel Morgan
- Saleem Mukuddem
- Oliver Pitcher
- Irving Romaine
- Ryan Steede
- Janeiro Tucker
England
- Robin Smith (c)
- Bill Athey
- Ian Austin
- David Capel
- Phil Defreitas
- Paul Jarvis
- Chris Lewis
- Graham Lloyd
- Neal Radford
- David Smith
- Peter Such
- Alan Wells
India
- Atul Bedade
- Venkatesh Prasad
- Salil Ankola
- Subroto Banerjee
- Rajesh Chauhan
- Narendra Hirwani
- Abey Kuruvilla
- Prashant Vaidya
- Atul Wassan
- Chandrakant Pandit
New Zealand
- Geoff Allott
- Mark Bailey
- Tony Blain
- Grant Bradburn
- Mark Douglas
- Simon Doull
- Trevor Franklin
- Chris Harris
- Mark Haslam
- Phil Horne
- Gavin Larsen
- Danny Morrison
- Murphy Su'a

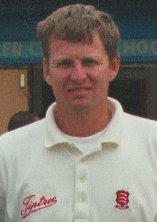
England squad member Peter Such

South Africa
- Derek Crookes
- Faiek Davids
- Fanie de Villiers
- Ismail Ebrahim
- Steven Jack
- Gary Kirsten
- Adrian Kuiper
- Hugh Page
- Meyrick Pringle
- Mark Rushmere
- Eric Simons
- Pieter Strydom
Sri Lanka
- Aravinda de Silva (c)
- Saliya Ahangama
- Asanka Gurusinha
- Chandika Hathurusingha
- Rumesh Ratnayake
- Ruwan Kalpage
- Roshan Mahanama
- Champaka Ramanayake
- Keerthi Ranasinghe
- Arjuna Ranatunga
- Sanjeeva Ranatunga
- Saliya Ahangama
- Rumesh Ratnayake
- Athula Samarasekera
- Sidath Wettimuny
West Indies (Cricket West Indies)
- Joel Garner (c)
- Kenny Benjamin
- Carlisle Best
- Hendy Bryan
- Sherwin Campbell
- Colin Croft
- Roland Holder
- Robert Haynes
- Collis King
- Thelston Payne
- Nehemiah Perry
- Richie Richardson
- Phil Simmons
- Stuart Williams

== Qualifying games ==
Game	Date	Batting 1st	Batting 2nd	Result
1	23 April	Bermuda 5/174	West Indies 8/116 (20)	Bermuda by 58 runs
2	23 April	India 6/112	England 5/113 (19)	England by 5 wickets
3	24 April	South Africa 5/220	Australia 137 (19.4)	South Africa by 83 runs
4	24 April	Sri Lanka 6/132	New Zealand 6/133 (18)	New Zealand by 4 wickets
5	26 April	Bermuda 5/143	England 6/138 (20)	Bermuda by 5 runs
6	26 April	India 9/135	West Indies 3/136 (20)	(Cricket West Indies) West Indies by 7 wickets
7	27 April	South Africa 3/249	New Zealand 9/169 (20)	South Africa by 80 runs
8	27 April	Australia 3/218	Sri Lanka 6/217 (20)	Australia by 1 run

== Plate Final ==
April 29, 2006

Australia; 116	v	West Indies; 3/120 (12.5)
Ian Healy 33; Joel Garner 3/9		Stuart Williams 73 n.o Rodney Hogg 1/10

West Indies won by 7 wickets
National Sports Centre
Umpires: G Francis and C Mitchley

== World Cricket Classic Final ==
April 29, 2006

South Africa; 5/266	v	Bermuda; 169
Steven Jack 109; Gary Kirsten 103; Saleem Mukuddem 2/39		Janeiro Tucker 63; Derek Crookes 3/29

South Africa won by 97 runs
National Sports Centre
Umpires: R Julian and S Asani
