= 2008 Associates Tri-Series in Canada =

- Date: 19 – 25 August 2008
- Location: Canada
- Result: West Indies won the series
- Player of the series: Rizwan Cheema
Teams
Bermuda	Canada	West Indies
Captains
Irving Romaine	Sunil Dhaniram	Chris Gayle
Most runs
Chris Douglas 122 Jekon Edness 49 Steven Outerbridge 32	Rizwan Cheema 184; Karun Jethi 87; Manoj David 82	Xavier Marshall 161; Chris Gayle 129; Leon Johnson 79
Most wickets
Stefan Kelly & Delyone Borden 3 Rodney Trott 2	Rizwan Cheema 4 Balaji Rao & Manoj David & Karun Jethi & Harvir Baidwan 2	Nikita Miller & Jerome Taylor & Brendan Nash 5

The Scotiabank Series 2008 was a One Day International cricket tri-series held in Canada involving the host, Bermuda and West Indies.

== Group stage ==
=== Points table ===
Pos	Team	Pld	W	L	Pts	NRR	Qualification
1	West Indies	2	2	0	4	1.526	Advanced to the final
2	Canada	2	1	1	2	−0.240	Advanced to the final
3	Bermuda	2	0	2	0	−1.190	

Source: ESPNCricinfo

== Fixtures ==
18 August
Scorecard

Canada; 260/7 (50 overs)	v	Bermuda; 235/8 (50 overs)
Manoj David 48 (82); Rodney Trott 2/50 (10 overs)		Chris Douglas 69 (113); Manoj David 2/30 (10 overs)

Canada won by 25 runs
Maple Leaf North-West Ground, King City, Canada
Umpires: Roger Dill (BER) & Darrell Hair (AUS)
Player of the match: Karun Jethi

20 August
Scorecard

Bermuda; 158/9 (50 overs)	v	West Indies; 159/4 (31.5 overs)
Chris Douglas 53 (105); Nikita Miller 3/19 (10 overs)		Ramnaresh Sarwan 49* (58); Delyone Borden 2/38 (8 overs)

West Indies won by 6 wickets
Maple Leaf North-West Ground, King City, Canada
Umpires: Roger Dill (BER) & Darrell Hair (AUS)
Player of the match: Ramnaresh Sarwan

22 August

West Indies; Xavier Marshall 157*(118)	v	Canada; 254 (47.2 overs)
303/4 (50 overs); Rizwan Cheema 3/31 (10)		Rizwan Cheema 89 (69); Brendan Nash 3/56 (10)

Maple Leaf North-West Ground, King City, Canada
Player of the match: West Indies won by 49 runs

== Final ==
24 August
(scorecard)

Canada; 179 (46.5 overs)	v	West Indies; 181/3 (27.3 overs)
Rizwan Cheema 61 (45); Jerome Taylor 3/33 (6.5 overs)		Chris Gayle 110* (77); Balaji Rao 2/50 (7 overs)

West Indies won by 7 wickets.
Maple Leaf North-West Ground, King City, Canada
Umpires: Roger Dill (BER) & Darrell Hair (AUS)
Player of the match: Chris Gayle
