= 2007 Cricket World Cup Group B =

The 2007 Cricket World Cup, which took place in the West Indies from 13 March to 28 April 2007, featured 16 teams, who were divided into four groups. Group B was made up of full ICC members Bangladesh, India, Sri Lanka and associate member Bermuda. Sri Lanka won all three of their matches to finish top of the group and secure qualification for the Super Eights stage of the tournament. Bangladesh's victory over India in their opening match meant they finished as runners-up and joined Sri Lanka in the Super Eights, while India (a pre-tournament favorite) and Bermuda were knocked out. Sri Lanka went on to finish second in the Super Eights and then beat New Zealand in their semi-final before losing to Australia in the final.

== Table ==
Pos	Team	Pld	W	L	T	NR	Pts	NRR
1	Sri Lanka	3	3	0	0	0	6	3.493
2	Bangladesh	3	2	1	0	0	4	−1.523
3	India	3	1	2	0	0	2	1.206
4	Bermuda	3	0	3	0	0	0	−4.345

Source: ESPNcricinfo

== Bermuda vs Sri Lanka ==
15 March 2007
14:30 (D/N)
Scorecard

Sri Lanka; 321/6 (50 overs)	v	Bermuda; 78 (24.4 overs)
Mahela Jayawardene 85 (90); Saleem Mukuddem 2/50 (10 overs)		Lionel Cann 28 (32); Farveez Maharoof 4/23 (7 overs)

Sri Lanka won by 243 runs
Queen's Park Oval, Port of Spain
Umpires: Daryl Harper (Aus) and Ian Howell (SA)
Player of the match: Mahela Jayawardene (SL)

- Sri Lanka won the toss and elected to bat.

Bermuda's World Cup debut became the second-heaviest defeat at the World Cup, 40 runs worse than Scotland's defeat the day before. After Sri Lanka won the toss and batted, they "capitalise[d] on the spate of loose deliveries" served up by Bermuda's bowlers, according to Cricinfo writer Siddhartha Vaidyanathan, Bermuda did take six wickets, all caught, while Mahela Jayawardene, Kumar Sangakkara and Chamara Silva all collected half-centuries. Kevin Hurdle took two wickets for Bermuda, but his second over lasted 14 balls due to no-balls and wides. Bermuda fell to 20 for four after Malinga had taken three wickets in three overs, ending with bowling figures of three for 10. With the seven first men down, Lionel Cann paired up with Delyone Borden for a 25-run partnership, the largest of the innings; Farveez Maharoof removed both before Muttiah Muralitharan had Dwayne Leverock lbw to end the innings for 78, Bermuda's lowest total ever in One Day Internationals.

== Bangladesh vs India ==
17 March 2007
09:30
Scorecard

India; 191 (49.3 overs)	v	Bangladesh; 192/5 (48.3 overs)
Sourav Ganguly 66 (129); Mashrafe Mortaza 4/38 (9.3 overs)		Mushfiqur Rahim 56* (107); Munaf Patel 2/38 (8.3 overs)

Bangladesh won by 5 wickets
Queen's Park Oval, Port of Spain
Umpires: Aleem Dar (Pak) and Steve Davis (Aus)
Player of the match: Mashrafe Mortaza (Ban)

- India won the toss and elected to bat.

Bangladesh, who went home from the 2003 World Cup without a single win and had been ranked bottom the 10 Test-playing nations as late as 2006, now celebrated their fifth victory against a top-eight side in their history, forcing India to win both their next games to have a chance of qualifying for the Super Eights.

India chose to bat first, but lost Virender Sehwag and Robin Uthappa to Mashrafe Mortaza in his opening spell. Described by the Cricinfo journalist as "at the heart of the impressive performance", Mortaza took two wickets in the opening spell and returned to remove the two final wickets, though he also bowled six no-balls in a spell of four for 38. Spinners Abdur Razzak and Mohammad Rafique took the remaining six wickets.

Teenagers Tamim Iqbal, Shakib Al Hasan and Mushfiqur Rahim, with 35 international games between them, all made half-centuries as Bangladesh passed the target of 192 with nine balls and five wickets to spare, despite losing three batsmen in single figures and two batsmen stumped off the bowling of part-timer Virender Sehwag. Tamim hit seven fours and two sixes in a near run-a-ball 51, well about the required run rate of four, which meant Shakib and Mushfiqur could score at rates between three and four an over. India also dropped two easy chances and three half-chances, "in stark contrast to Bangladesh's efforts on the field", as they failed to bowl out their opposition.

The win caused mass celebrations in Bangladesh. Though the country is officially in a state of emergency and public gatherings are outlawed, thousands of people celebrated in the streets of Dhaka, waving flags and chanting, and there were also processions in Chittagong and in Mortaza's hometown, Narail.

== Bermuda v India ==
19 March
Scorecard

India; 413/5 (50 overs)	v	Bermuda; 156 (43.1 overs)
Virender Sehwag 114 (87); Delyone Borden 2/30 (5 overs)		David Hemp 76* (105); Ajit Agarkar 3/38 (10 overs)

India won by 257 runs
Queen's Park Oval, Port of Spain
Umpires: Aleem Dar (Pak) and Ian Howell (SA)
Player of the match: Virender Sehwag (Ind)

- Bermuda won the toss and elected to field.

After the upset in the first group match against Bangladesh, India came back strongly against Bermuda, breaking several records in the process. Their total of 413 for five was the first World Cup innings worth more than 400, and their margin of 257 runs the largest margin of victory in an ODI. It was also the highest score in World Cup history, breaking the 400 barrier. India also broke their team record score of 376/2, and equalled the ODI record for the maximum number of sixes in an innings by scoring 18 sixes, a feat first achieved by South Africa against the Netherlands earlier in the tournament.

In reply, Bermuda's only professional, Glamorgan player David Hemp, hit nine fours and one six in an unbeaten innings of 76, 50 runs more than any other batsman could contribute. Zaheer Khan bowled both openers, while Ajit Agarkar had three wickets in six balls, causing Bermuda to crash from 106 for five to 110 for eight. Hemp then put on 44 with Dwayne Leverock before Sachin Tendulkar and Anil Kumble ended the resistance. Extras were the second-highest score of Bermuda's innings, with 27, as four bowlers conceded a total of 12 wides.

== Bangladesh vs Sri Lanka ==
21 March 2007
scorecard

Sri Lanka; 318/4 (50 overs)	v	Bangladesh; 112 (37 overs)
Sanath Jayasuriya 109 (87); Mohammad Rafique 1/48 (10 overs)		Mohammad Ashraful 45* (63); Lasith Malinga 3/27 (6 overs)

Sri Lanka won by 198 runs (D/L method)
Queen's Park Oval, Port of Spain
Umpires: Steve Davis (Aus) and Daryl Harper (Aus)
Player of the match: Sanath Jayasuriya (SL)

- Sri Lanka won the toss and elected to bat.

Bangladesh's chances of reaching the Super Eights by means of net run rate diminished after a 198-run defeat to Sri Lanka, the third-heaviest of their history and the largest since their 200-run defeat to India in the 2003 TVS Cup Tri Series. Indeed, it was only due to the rain during Bangladesh's innings and the consequently readjusted target that the margin of victory was smaller; Bangladesh were bowled out for 112, with all the Sri Lankan bowlers except Sanath Jayasuriya taking wickets, but Jayasuriya had already contributed with seven sixes in his 24th One Day International century as Sri Lanka totalled 318 for four. Spinners Mohammad Rafique and Abdur Razzak were the only ones to keep the economy rate below five an over, while for Sri Lanka only Russel Arnold cost more than five an over. Four Sri Lankan batsmen outscored Bangladesh's top-scoring batsman, Ashraful, who made 45 not out from number seven.

== India vs Sri Lanka ==
23 March 2007
Scorecard

Sri Lanka; 254/6 (50 overs)	v	India; 185 (43.3 overs)
Upul Tharanga 64 (90); Zaheer Khan 2/49 (10 overs)		Rahul Dravid 60 (82); Muttiah Muralitharan 3/41 (10 overs)

Sri Lanka won by 69 runs
Queen's Park Oval, Port of Spain
Umpires: Aleem Dar (Pak) and Daryl Harper (Aus)
Player of the match: Muttiah Muralitharan (SL)

- Sri Lanka won the toss and elected to bat.

Four years after losing the 2003 World Cup final, India were all but eliminated from the World Cup, now relying on Bermuda to beat Bangladesh in order to qualify for the Super Eights, causing "financial disasters" for the Indian TV channels who had bought broadcasting rights at large prices. Sri Lanka, meanwhile, went through to the second stage unbeaten, after newcomers to the team Upul Tharanga and Chamara Silva both struck half-centuries and Muttiah Muralitharan took three wickets, including wicket-keeper MS Dhoni for a duck.

The first innings was described as a "cat-and-mouse battle" by Cricinfo reporter Siddhartha Vaidyanathan. Zaheer Khan started off with a wide, but also had Sanath Jayasuriya caught behind in his opening spell, striking at the end of the seventh over, and also had Tharanga in trouble with in-cutters. Tharanga, however, batted through nearly two thirds of the match for his 64, and none of the bowlers managed to keep the run rate below four as Sri Lanka made it to 254 for six, despite India's bowlers putting in a performance described as "impressive" (Cricinfo), "giv[ing] the Sri Lankans a huge scare" (Indian Express). Russel Arnold and Chaminda Vaas hit 38 off the final 23 balls, with five fours and a six.

For Sri Lanka, Chaminda Vaas struck twice within eleven overs, taking a return catch off Robin Uthappa and having Sourav Ganguly caught for a 23-ball seven. Sachin Tendulkar followed in the next over, bowled by Dilhara Fernando for his second duck of the tournament, but Virender Sehwag and Rahul Dravid made it through the next ten overs, before the "turning point" arrived, again according to Cricinfo. Muttiah Muralitharan had Sehwag caught at first slip in his third over; the next six overs yielded only 14 runs and two more wickets, after Dhoni went lbw to Muralitharan, and India needed 141 runs off 22 overs. Despite double-digit scores from Ajit Agarkar, Harbhajan Singh and Munaf Patel, they were bowled out for 185.

== Bangladesh vs Bermuda ==
25 March 2007
scorecard

Bermuda; 94/9 (21 overs)	v	Bangladesh; 96/3 (17.3 overs)
Dean Minors 23 (25); Abdur Razzak 3/20 (4 overs)		Mohammad Ashraful 29* (32); Saleem Mukuddem 3/19 (5 overs)

Bangladesh won by 7 wickets (DLS method)
Queen's Park Oval, Port of Spain
Umpires: Steve Davis (Aus) and Ian Howell (SA)
Player of the match: Mohammad Ashraful (Ban)

- Bangladesh won the toss and elected to field.
- Match reduced to 21 Over due to rain

Bangladesh advanced to the Super Eights after defeating Bermuda in this heavily rain-affected match, thus sending India home after the group stages. Bermuda opened the batting after rain had reduced the game to 41 overs per side. Four more interruptions followed, as the game was eventually cut to 21 overs a side with Bermuda at 45 for four.

Set 96 to win after hitting from Dean Minors and Lionel Cann and a slight Duckworth–Lewis adjustment, Bangladesh fell to 37 for three after three wickets from Saleem Mukuddem, but Shakib Al Hasan went unbeaten for his second match running against Bermuda, making 26 not out and a partnership of 59 for the fourth wicket with Mohammad Ashraful. Extras made up almost a quarter of the total, with Kevin Hurdle conceding seven wides in his four overs.
