= List of Bermuda cricket captains =

This is a list of all cricketers who have captained Bermuda in an official international match. This includes One Day Internationals and ICC Trophy games. The information is updated as of the 2007 Cricket World Cup.

== One Day International ==
Bermuda played their first ODI on May 17, 2006

Bermudian ODI Captains
No.	Name	Year	Played	Won	Tied	Lost	NR
1	Janeiro Tucker	2006	3	1	0	2	0
2	Irving Romaine	2006–2009	32	6	0	26	0
Overall			35	7	0	28	0

== T20 International ==
Bermuda played their first Twenty20 International on August 3, 2008

Bermudian T20I Captains
No.	Name	Year	Played	Won	Tied	Lost	NR
1	Irving Romaine	2008	2	0	0	2	0
2	Rodney Trott	2008–2019	4	0	0	4	0
3	Dion Stovell	2019	3	0	0	3	0
4	Terryn Fray	2019–present	6	4	0	1	1
Overall			15	4	0	10	1

== Youth One Day Internationals ==
Bermuda played their first Youth ODI on February 18, 2008

Bermudian T20I Captains
No.	Name	Year	Played	Won	Tied	Lost	NR
1	Rodney Trott	2008	5	1	0	4	0
Overall			5	1	0	4	0

== ICC Trophy ==
Bermuda debuted in the ICC Trophy in the 1979 tournament

Bermudian ICC Trophy Captains
Number	Name	Year	Played	Won	Tied	Lost	No Result
1	Gladstone Brown	1979–1979	4	3	0	1	0
2	Colin Blades	1982–1982	8	7	0	1	0
3	Arnold Manders	1986–1986	15	10	0	5	0
4	Noel Gibbons	1986–1986	1	1	0	0	0
5	Albert Steede	1993/94–1996/97	15	9	0	5	1
6	Charlie Marshall	2001–2001	6	3	0	3	0
7	Clay Smith	2005–2005	2	0	0	2	0
8	Janeiro Tucker	2005–2005	5	3	0	1	1
Overall			56	36	0	18	2
