= 2008 World Twenty20 Qualifier =

International cricket tournament

2008 ICC World Twenty20 Qualifier
- Dates: 2 August – 5 August
- Administrator: International Cricket Council
- Cricket format: Twenty20 International
- Tournament format(s): Group stage and Knockout
- Host: Ireland
- Champions: Ireland & Netherlands (shared) (1st title)
- Participants: 6
- Matches: 11
- Player of the series: (Ireland) Andre Botha
- Most runs: (Scotland) Ryan Watson (100)
- Most wickets: (Scotland) Dewald Nel (9)
- Official website: 2008 Qualifier Official Website

The 2008 ICC World Twenty20 Qualifier was the inaugural tournament of ICC World Twenty20 Qualifier and was played between 2 and 5 August 2008 in Stormont, Belfast in Northern Ireland. The top three played in the 2009 ICC World Twenty20, the international championship of Twenty20 cricket. The six competing teams were: Bermuda, Canada, Ireland, Kenya, The Netherlands and Scotland.

The competition was won by Ireland and the Netherlands, who shared the trophy after rain forced the final to be abandoned without a ball bowled. Both teams qualified for the 2009 ICC World Twenty20 finals in England. After the withdrawal of Zimbabwe from the competition, the two finalists were joined by third-placed Scotland who eliminated Kenya.

== Group stage ==
=== Group A ===
Pos	Team	Pld	W	L	T	NR	Pts	NRR	Qualification
1	Ireland	2	2	0	0	0	4	0.205	Semi-finals
2	Scotland	2	1	1	0	0	2	0.313	Semi-finals
3	Bermuda	2	0	2	0	0	0	−0.610	5th Place playoff

2 August
Scorecard

Scotland; 117 (20 overs)	v	Ireland; 118/6 (19.5 overs)
Neil McCallum 27 (25); Alex Cusack 4/21 (4 overs)		Andree Botha 38 (34); Glenn Rogers 2/15 (3.5 overs)

Ireland won by 4 wickets
Civil Service Cricket Club Ground, Belfast
Umpires: Niels Bagh (Den) and Sarika Prasad (Sin)
Player of the match: Andre Botha (Ire)

3 August
Scorecard

Bermuda; 99/7 (20 overs)	v	Scotland; 100/2 (17.4 overs)
Steven Outerbridge 37* (35); Dewald Nel 3/12 (4 overs)		Colin Smith 46* (42); George O'Brien 2/11 (4 overs)

Scotland won by 8 wickets
Civil Service Cricket Club Ground, Belfast
Umpires: Niels Bagh (Den) and Sarika Prasad (Sin)
Player of the match: Dewald Nel (Sco)

3 August
Scorecard

Ireland; 43/7 (9 overs)	v	Bermuda; 41/8 (9 overs)
Gary Wilson 7 (12); Irving Romaine 2/2 (1 over)		Steven Outerbridge 8 (6); Peter Connell 3/8 (2 overs)

Ireland won by 4 runs (D/L)
Civil Service Cricket Club Ground, Belfast
Umpires: Paul Baldwin (Ger) and Sarika Prasad (Sin)
Player of the match: Peter Connell (Ire)

- Match reduced to 9 overs per side due to rain.

=== Group B ===
Pos	Team	Pld	W	L	T	NR	Pts	NRR	Qualification
1	Netherlands	2	1	1	0	0	2	0.351	Semi-finals
2	Kenya	2	1	1	0	0	2	−0.126	Semi-finals
3	Canada	2	1	1	0	0	2	−0.185	5th Place playoff

2 August
Scorecard

Netherlands; 153/5 (20 overs)	v	Kenya; 134/9 (20 overs)
Ryan ten Doeschate 56 (45); Hiren Varaiya 2/24 (4 overs)		Steve Tikolo 37 (33); Edgar Schiferli 3/23 (4 overs)

Netherlands won by 19 runs
Civil Service Cricket Club Ground, Belfast
Umpires: Paul Baldwin (Ger) and Darrell Hair (Aus)
Player of the match: RN ten Doeschate (Net)

2 August
Scorecard

Netherlands; 97 (18.4 overs)	v	Canada; 98/6 (19.3 overs)
Peter Borren 37 (38); Harvir Baidwan 4/19 (4 overs)		Sunil Dhaniram 26 (21); Peter Borren 2/19 (4 overs)

Canada won by 4 wickets
Civil Service Cricket Club Ground, Belfast
Umpires: Niels Bagh (Den) and Darrell Hair (Aus)
Player of the match: Harvir Baidwan (Can)

3 August
Scorecard

Canada; 91 (19.4 overs)	v	Kenya; 92/6 (17.5 overs)
Sanjayan Thuraisingam 15 (18); Peter Ongondo 2/18 (3 overs)		Kennedy Otieno 40 (42); Harvir Baidwan 2/12 (2 overs)

Kenya won by 4 wickets
Civil Service Cricket Club Ground, Belfast
Umpires: Paul Baldwin (Ger) and Darrell Hair (Aus)
Player of the match: Kennedy Otieno (Ken)

== Knockout stage ==
=== Bracket ===
Semi-finals
B2	Kenya	67 (17.2)
A1	Ireland	72/6 (19.1)
A2	Scotland	107/8 (20)
B1	Netherlands	110/5 (18)

Final
A1	Ireland
B1	Netherlands
3rd Place Playoff
B2	Kenya	106/9 (20)
A2	Scotland	107/1 (18.1)

5th Place playoff
A3	Bermuda	70 (20)
B3	Canada	71/2 (10.3)

=== Semi-finals ===
4 August
Scorecard

Kenya; 67 (17.2 overs)	v	Ireland; 72/6 (19.1 overs)
Steve Tikolo 13 (26); Andre Botha 3/20 (4 overs)		Andre Botha 22 (34); Ragheb Aga 2/12 (4 overs)

Ireland won by 4 wickets
Civil Service Cricket Club Ground, Belfast
Umpires: Darrell Hair (Aus) and Sarika Prasad (Sin)
Player of the match: Andre Botha (Ire)

4 August
Scorecard

Scotland; 107/8 (20 overs)	v	Netherlands; 110/5 (18 overs)
Kyle Coetzer 40 (44); Ryan ten Doeschate 3/23 (4 overs)		Eric Szwarczynski 30 (39); Richie Berrington 2/22 (4 overs)

Netherlands won by 5 wickets
Civil Service Cricket Club Ground, Stormont, Belfast
Umpires: Niels Bagh (Den) and Paul Baldwin (Ger)
Player of the match: Ryan ten Doeschate (Ned)

=== Finals ===
==== 3rd Place Playoff ====
4 August
Scorecard

Kenya; 106/9 (20 overs)	v	Scotland; 107/1 (18.1 overs)
Ragheb Aga 28 (25); Dewald Nel 3/10 (4 overs)		Ryan Watson 54 (61); Tony Suji 1/21 (3 overs)

Scotland won by 9 wickets
Civil Service Cricket Club Ground, Belfast
Umpires: Paul Baldwin (Ger) and Darrell Hair (Aus)
Player of the match: Ryan Watson (Sco)

==== 5th Place playoff ====
5 August
Scorecard

Bermuda; 70 (20 overs)	v	Canada; 71/2 (10.3 overs)
Oliver Pitcher 15 (27); Steve Welsh 2/6 (3 overs)		Geoff Barnett 31* (34); Stefan Kelly 2/21 (2 overs)

Canada won by 8 wickets
Civil Service Cricket Club Ground, Belfast
Umpires: Niels Bagh (Den) and Sarika Prasad (Sin)
Player of the match: Steve Welsh (Can)

==== The Final ====
5 August
Scorecard

Ireland	v	Netherlands

Match abandoned with a toss
Civil Service Cricket Club Ground, Belfast
Umpires: Paul Baldwin (Ger) and Darrell Hair (Aus)

- Match abandoned due to rain. Ireland and the Netherlands share the trophy.

== Final standings ==
Position	Team
1st	Ireland
1st	Netherlands
3rd	Scotland
4th	Kenya
5th	Canada
6th	Bermuda

Qualified for the 2009 ICC World Twenty20.
