= George O'Brien (cricketer) =

Bermudian cricketer (born 1984)

Personal information
- Full name: George Hubert O'Brien
- Born: 16 September 1984 (age 42)
- Batting: Right-handed
- Bowling: Right arm fast-medium

International information
- National side: Bermuda (2006–2019)
- ODI debut (cap 7): 17 May 2006 v Canada
- Last ODI: 18 August 2008 v Canada
- T20I debut (cap 7): 3 August 2008 v Netherlands
- Last T20I: 26 October 2019 v Netherlands

Career statistics
Competition	ODI	T20I
Matches	9	11
Runs scored	38	32
Batting average	5.42	8.00
100s/50s	0/0	0/0
Top score	16	7*
Balls bowled	456	231
Wickets	15	13
Bowling average	27.00	17.84
5 wickets in innings	0	0
10 wickets in match	0	0
Best bowling	3/31	2/11
Catches/stumpings	1/–	2/–
- Source: Cricinfo, 30 April 2023

George Hubert O'Brien (born 16 September 1984) is a Bermudian cricketer, who played with the Bermudian cricket team in their first One Day International when they played Canada on 17 May 2006. O'Brien took two wickets as Bermuda won the game by three wickets under the Duckworth–Lewis method. Three days later, O'Brien took two more wickets against Zimbabwe.

He has since gone on to represent Bermuda in four ODIs, but has been the subject of some controversy. His contract with the Bermuda Cricket Board was terminated in October due to a lack of motivation and commitment and a poor work ethic. In July 2010, O'Brien was the victim of a machete attack, which left him with serious injuries.

In August 2019, he was named in Bermuda's squad for the Regional Finals of the 2018–19 ICC T20 World Cup Americas Qualifier tournament. In September 2019, he was named in Bermuda's squad for the 2019 ICC T20 World Cup Qualifier tournament in the United Arab Emirates.
