= Alma Hunt =

Bermudian-Scottish cricketer (1910–1999)

Alma Hunt OBE
Personal information
- Full name: Alma Victor Hunt
- Born: 1 October 1910; Somerset, Bermuda
- Died: 5 March 1999 (aged 88); Sandys, Bermuda
- Nickname: Champ
- Batting: Left-handed
- Bowling: Right-arm fast-medium

International information
- National side: Bermuda (1925–1956)

Domestic team information
- Years: Team
- 1938: Scotland

Career statistics
Competition	First-class
Matches	2
Runs scored	65
Batting average	16.25
100s/50s	0/0
Top score	31
Balls bowled	228
Wickets	2
Bowling average	35.50
5 wickets in innings	0
10 wickets in match	0
Best bowling	1/15
Catches/stumpings	3/0
- Source: Cricket Archive, 16 June 2020

Alma Victor Hunt OBE (1 October 1910 – 5 March 1999) was a Bermudian and Scottish cricketer. He was a left-handed batsman and a right-arm fast-medium bowler.

== Career ==
Hunt started his career playing in his native Bermuda, and scored his first century in an organised game at the age of 10. Considered one of the finest cricketers Bermuda has ever produced, he was selected to take part in trials for the West Indian cricket team in 1933, although not given a place on the West indies team that went to England. He played one first-class match for G. C. Grant's XI as part of the trials, but was not selected when doubts were raised about his eligibility.

The following year, he moved to Scotland to play as a professional with Aberdeenshire. He later played twice for Scotland in 1938 against Australia and Yorkshire. The game against Yorkshire was his second and final first-class appearance. In a match for Aberdeenshire against West Lothian in 1939, Hunt took seven wickets for 11 runs as West Lothian scored 48. In response, Hunt opened the batting and scored all 49 runs required to win, hitting two sixes and eight boundaries in 25 minutes.

He moved back to Bermuda, and became heavily involved with administration of cricket on the island. He became President of the Bermuda Cricket Board in 1966, holding the office for 18 consecutive years. It was Hunt who, as Bermuda's delegate to the International Cricket Council (ICC), first proposed the ICC Trophy competition, which was first played in 1979 and still serves as a qualifier for the Cricket World Cup. He was appointed Officer of the Order of the British Empire (OBE) in the 1978 New Year Honours for services to sport in Bermuda.

He died in Bermuda 1999 and had asked for a piper to play a lament at his funeral to mark his connection to Scotland. In his obituary in the 2000 Wisden Cricketers' Almanack, he was described as the best cricketer ever to emerge from Bermuda.

In March 2016, Neil Drysdale, a Scottish sports writer, included Hunt in a series of articles entitled "Heroes of Associate Cricket". His tribute included recollections from Hunt's daughter, Beverley Baldwin.

== Sources ==
- Martin-Jenkins, C. (1983) The Cricketer Book of Cricket Disasters and Bizarre Records, Century Publishing: London. ISBN 07126 0191 0.
