= Kyle Hodsoll =

Bermudian cricketer (born 1988)

Personal information
- Full name: Kyle Christopher Hodsoll
- Born: 24 November 1988 (age 37); Bermuda
- Batting: Right-handed
- Bowling: Right-arm medium-fast

International information
- National side: Bermuda (2007–2021)
- ODI debut (cap 29): 28 October 2007 v Kenya
- Last ODI: 8 August 2008 v Netherlands
- T20I debut (cap 14): 5 August 2008 v Canada
- Last T20I: 14 November 2021 v Argentina

Career statistics
Competition	ODI	T20I	FC	LA
Matches	3	4	1	12
Runs scored	2	0	4	13
Batting average	2.00	0.00	4.00	1.85
100s/50s	–/–	–/–	–/–	–/–
Top score	2*	0	4*	7
Balls bowled	102	54	90	450
Wickets	3	2	0	10
Bowling average	33.33	29.50	–	42.00
5 wickets in innings	–	–	–	–
10 wickets in match	–	–	–	–
Best bowling	2/48	2/19	–	2/48
Catches/stumpings	1/–	2/–	–/–	2/–
- Source: ESPN Cricinfo, 29 November 2022

Kyle Hodsoll (born 24 November 1988) is a Bermudian cricketer. He made his One Day International debut against Kenya at Nairobi in 2007.

In August 2019, he was named in Bermuda's squad for the Regional Finals of the 2018–19 ICC T20 World Cup Americas Qualifier tournament. In November 2019, he was named in Bermuda's squad for the Cricket World Cup Challenge League B tournament in Oman.

In October 2021, Hodsoll was named in Bermuda's squad for the 2021 ICC Men's T20 World Cup Americas Qualifier tournament in Antigua. On 10 November he played for Bermuda against the Bahamas after an absence of 13 years and 97 days from Twenty20 Internationals, setting a new record for the longest gap between T20I appearances.
