= Tim Hemp =

Bermudian cricketer (born 1974)

Personal information
- Full name: Timothy James Hemp
- Born: 12 April 1974 (age 52); Hamilton, Bermuda
- Batting: Right-handed
- Bowling: Right-arm medium
- Relatives: David Hemp (brother)

Domestic team information
- Years: Team
- 1995–1999: Wales Minor Counties

Career statistics
Competition	List A
Matches	1
Runs scored	1
Batting average	1.00
100s/50s	0/0
Top score	1
Catches/stumpings	0/–
- Source: Cricinfo, 1 January 2011

Timothy James Hemp (born 12 April 1974) is a Bermudian former cricketer. Hemp was a right-handed batsman who bowled right-arm medium pace. He was born at Hamilton, Bermuda.

Hemp made his debut for Wales Minor Counties in the 1995 Minor Counties Championship against Dorset. He made twelve further Minor Counties Championship appearances for the team, the last of which came against Cheshire in 1999. His MCCA Knockout Trophy debut for the team came in 1996 against Cornwall. He represented the team in a total of five MCCA Knockout Trophy matches, the last of which came against the Warwickshire Cricket Board in 1999. His only List A appearance for the team came in the 3rd round of the 1999 NatWest Trophy against Somerset, where Hemp scored only a single run before being dismissed by Andy Caddick.

His brother, David, played One Day International and Twenty20 cricket for Bermuda, as well as playing first-class cricket for Warwickshire and Glamorgan.
