= Niraj Odedra =

Indian cricketer and coach (born 1975)

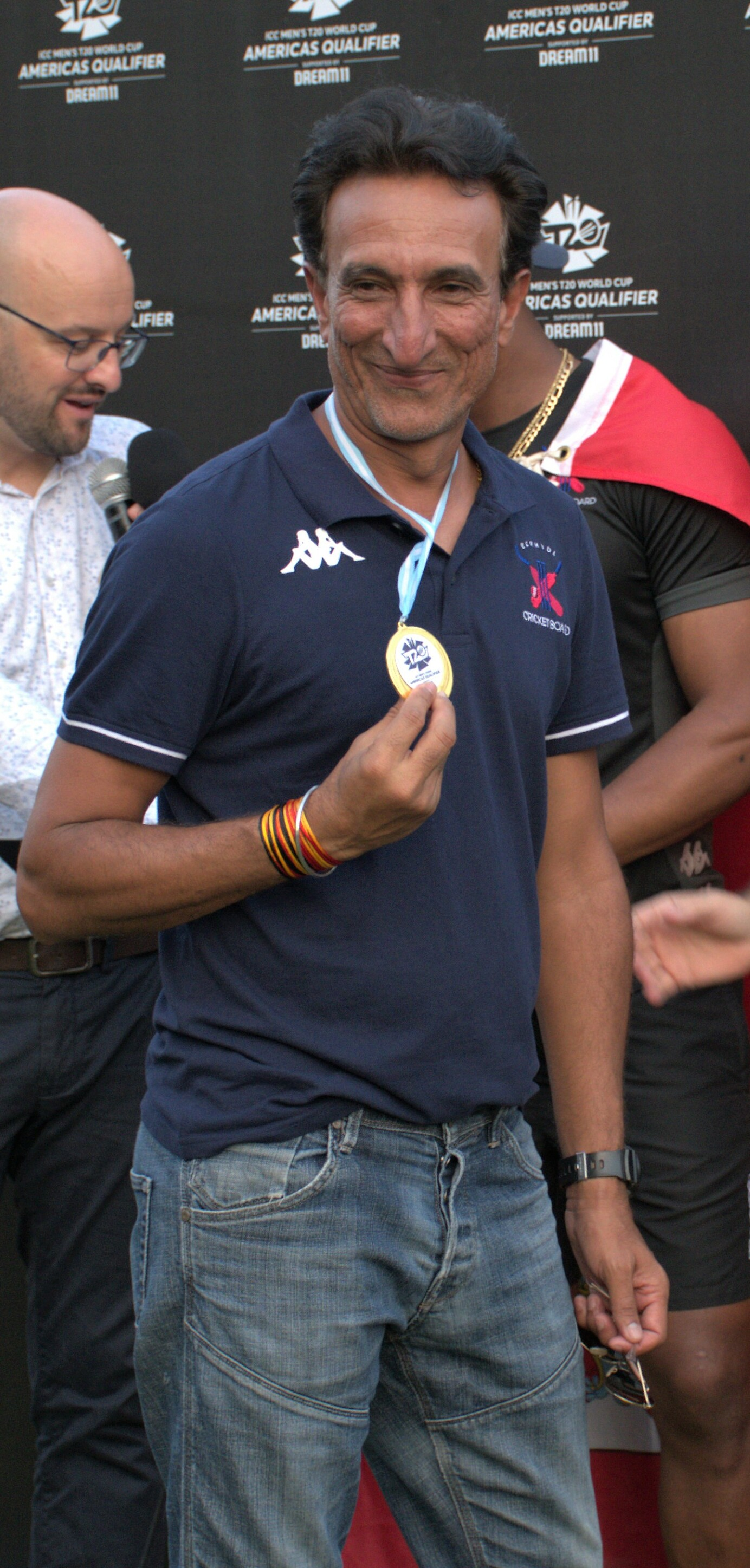

Personal information
- Full name: Niraj Rambhai Odedra
- Born: 18 January 1975 (age 51); Porbandar, Gujarat, India
- Batting: Right-handed
- Bowling: Right-arm off spin

Head coaching information
- Years: Team
- 2020–present: Saurashtra
- 2022–present: Bermuda
- Source: ESPNcricinfo, 26 January 2023

Niraj Rambhai Odedra (born 18 January 1975) is an Indian cricket coach and former player. He was appointed head coach of Saurashtra in 2020 and additionally became coach of the Bermuda national cricket team in 2022. He previously played for Saurashtra as a right-arm off spin bowler.

== Early life ==
Odedra was born on 18 January 1975 in Porbandar, Gujarat, India.

== Playing career ==
Odedra played 26 Ranji Trophy matches and 22 List A matches for Saurashtra between 1998 and 2004. He took 80 first-class wickets including two ten-wicket hauls.

Odedra also played for Chingford in the Essex Cricket League where he was the leading runscorer from 2004 to 2006.

== Coaching career ==
In 2015, Odedra was appointed as Saurashtra's bowling and fielding coach. He was an assistant coach during the team's maiden title victory in the 2019–20 Ranji Trophy. In April 2020 he was appointed to succeed Karsan Ghavri as Saurashtra's head coach.

In June 2022, Odedra was appointed coach of the Bermuda national cricket team on a short-term contract, replacing interim coach Cal Waldron. His initial contract expired in September 2022, but he returned to oversee the team's preparation for the 2023 ICC Men's T20 World Cup Americas Qualifier.
