= Karun Jethi =

Canadian cricketer (born 1983)

Personal information
- Full name: Karun Jethi
- Born: 19 December 1983 (age 42); Delhi, India
- Batting: Right-handed
- Bowling: Right-arm off-break
- Role: Bowler

International information
- National side: Canada
- ODI debut (cap 60): 18 August 2008 v Bermuda
- Last ODI: 24 August 2008 v West Indies
- T20I debut (cap 6): 2 August 2008 v Netherlands
- Last T20I: 13 October 2008 v Zimbabwe

Career statistics
| Competition | ODI | T20I |
|---|---|---|
| Matches | 3 | 5 |
| Runs scored | 87 | 41 |
| Batting average | 43.50 | 10.25 |
| 100s/50s | 0/0 | 0/0 |
| Top score | 46* | 24 |
| Balls bowled | 102 | – |
| Wickets | 2 | – |
| Bowling average | 42.50 | – |
| 5 wickets in innings | 0 | – |
| 10 wickets in match | 0 | – |
| Best bowling | 2/39 | – |
| Catches/stumpings | 0/– | 1/– |
- Source: ESPNcricinfo, 29 November 2008

Karun Jethi (born 19 December 1983) is an Indian-born former cricketer who has played three One Day Internationals (ODIs) and five Twenty20 Internationals for Canada.

Jethi made his ODI debut against Bermuda on 18 August 2008 in the Scotiabank series which included West Indies, Canada and Bermuda. In that match, Jethi scored an unbeaten 46 from 36 balls and took two wickets which earned him the Man of the Match award.
