= Manoj David =

Sri Lankan-born cricketer (born 1975)

Personal information
- Full name: Ramesh Randeer David
- Born: 8 February 1975 (age 51); Colombo, Sri Lanka
- Nickname: Manoj
- Batting: Right-handed
- Bowling: Right-arm off-break
- Role: Batsman

International information
- National side: Canada
- ODI debut (cap 59): 18 August 2008 v Bermuda
- Last ODI: 24 August 2008 v West Indies
- T20I debut (cap 16): 10 October 2008 v Pakistan
- Last T20I: 13 October 2008 v Zimbabwe

Career statistics
Competition	ODI	T20I
Matches	3	4
Runs scored	82	39
Batting average	27.33	9.75
100s/50s	0/0	0/0
Top score	48	17
Balls bowled	84	–
Wickets	2	–
Bowling average	29.50	–
5 wickets in innings	0	–
10 wickets in match	0	–
Best bowling	2/30	–
Catches/stumpings	0/–	2/–
- Source: ESPNcricinfo, 28 April 2020

Ramesh Randeer "Manoj" David (born 8 February 1975) is a Sri Lankan-born cricketer who has played three One Day Internationals and four Twenty20 Internationals for Canada.
