= Clay Smith (cricketer) =

Bermudian cricketer

Personal information
- Born: 15 January 1971 (age 55); Bermuda
- Batting: Right-handed
- Bowling: Right-arm off-spin
- Relatives: Jonte Smith (son)

International information
- National side: Bermuda (1991–2007)
- ODI debut (cap 17): 19 August 2006 v Canada
- Last ODI: 15 March 2007 v Sri Lanka

Head coaching information
- Years: Team
- 2015–2018: Bermuda

Career statistics
Competition	ODI
Matches	12
Runs scored	192
Batting average	16.00
100s/50s	0/1
Top score	52
Catches/stumpings	3/–
- Source: ESPNcricinfo, 25 March 2016

Clay James Smith (born 15 January 1971) is a Bermudian former international cricketer who represented the Bermudian national team between 1991 and 2007. He also coached the team from 2015 to 2018.

Having debuted for Bermuda in 1991, Smith first came to notice at the 1994 ICC Trophy in Kenya, where he ranked fourth in overall runs scored and helped his team to the semi-finals. He remained one of Bermuda's leading batsmen for over a decade, appearing in another three ICC Trophy tournaments and also in several editions of the West Indian domestic one-day competition (where Bermuda competed as a guest team). In the 1997–98 Red Stripe Bowl, Smith scored two centuries (against the Windward Islands and Jamaica), becoming the first Bermudian to score a List A hundred. He was appointed captain of Bermuda in 2004, and served in the position until the end of 2006, although he missed a number of matches due to injury towards the end of his tenure. Smith retired from international cricket after the 2007 World Cup.

== Playing career ==
=== Early years ===
Smith was born into a sporting family. His father, Mansfield Smith, was a club cricketer and later a prominent sports administrator, while his older brother, Wendell Smith, also played cricket for Bermuda. Another brother, Ray, was an all-round sportsman best known as a boxer, serving as Bermuda's middleweight champion for a period. A former Bermuda under-19s player, Clay Smith made his senior debut for Bermuda in 1991, playing against a touring team from India's Hyderabad Cricket Association. He was selected for his first international tour the following year, when Bermuda toured England. At the 1994 ICC Trophy in Kenya, Smith played in all nine of Bermuda's matches, scoring 391 runs at an average of 55.85. Only two players (teammate Dexter Smith and the Netherlands' Nolan Clarke) scored more runs, while Kenya's Maurice Odumbe scored the same number as Smith (at a better average, however). Smith's highest score was an innings of 108 in Bermuda's semi-final loss to Kenya, while he also scored 89 against Ireland, 71 against the United Arab Emirates, and 51 against Denmark.

In October 1996, Bermuda were invited to compete in the Shell/Sandals Trophy, the West Indian domestic limited-overs competition. Making his List A debut, Smith scored a total of 151 runs at the tournament, behind only Charlie Marshall for Bermuda. His tournament included half-centuries in the opening two games – 52 against the Windward Islands and 69 against Barbados. Both Smith and the team as a whole had little success at their next major tournament, the 1997 ICC Trophy in Malaysia. Smith scored only 126 runs from six innings (with a highest of 43 not out against Italy), while Bermuda failed to make the tournament's second round, placing ninth overall (after a fourth-place finish at the previous edition). Later in 1997, Smith represented Bermuda in the 1997–98 Red Stripe Bowl (the renamed Shell/Sandals Trophy). In the second match of the tournament, against the Windward Islands, he scored 100 not out, the first List-A century by a Bermudian. Two matches later, against Jamaica, he scored 101 not out, though neither of his innings were enough to secure his team a win.

At the 2001 ICC Trophy in Canada, Smith was Bermuda's leading run-scorer, making 184 runs from six innings. His tournament included scores of 60 not out against Papua New Guinea and 91 against Hong Kong.

=== Captaincy and later years ===
Smith was appointed captain of Bermuda in 2004, and his first major tournament in charge was the 2004 ICC Americas Championship, which Bermuda hosted. He made 190 runs from five innings (behind only Canada's Desmond Chumney overall), which included scores of 58 against the Cayman Islands and 62 against Canada. Just days after the end of the Americas Championship, Bermuda faced the United States in an Intercontinental Cup match. Making his first-class debut, Smith scored 62 in the first innings and 65 in the second, although this was not enough to prevent a 114-run loss. He also became only the second person to captain Bermuda in a first-class match, after Joseph Bailey (who did so in 1971). Smith remained in good form during the 2005 ICC Intercontinental Cup, scoring two centuries – 138 against the Cayman Islands and 126 not out against Kenya. He finished the tournament with 361 runs in three matches, behind only Kenya's Steve Tikolo and Ireland's Jeremy Bray overall.

In the opening match of the 2005 ICC Trophy, against Ireland, Smith retired hurt after tearing a hamstring. With Janeiro Tucker substituting as captain in his absence, he did not return to the team until their semi-final against Scotland, by which time Bermuda had already secured their qualification for the 2007 World Cup. By qualifying for the World Cup, Bermuda also secured One Day International (ODI) status. They went on to make their ODI debut in May 2006, in a triangular series against Canada and Zimbabwe. Struggling with a knee injury, Smith did not make his own ODI debut until August. In December 2006, it was confirmed that he had been permanently replaced as captain by Irving Romaine, who had already held the position on a temporary basis for much of the year. Smith never captained Bermuda at ODI level.

Playing against Ireland in the 2007 World Cricket League Division One tournament, Smith scored 52 from 47 balls, his only ODI half-century. At the World Cup, two months later, he featured in only one of Bermuda's three matches, against Sri Lanka. He was dismissed by Chaminda Vaas for a five-ball duck, as his team lost by 243 runs. Smith announced his retirement from international cricket a few weeks after the end of the World Cup.

== Coaching career ==
Smith began working as a player-coach in Bermudian club cricket during his international career, serving in that position for both St David's and St George's. However, he took a break from coaching at the end of the 2011 season, citing exhaustion. In 2014, Smith was appointed coach of the Cleveland County Cricket Club, which plays in the Eastern Counties Cricket Association. In his first season, the club won the Eastern Counties title for the first time in 33 years. The club retained the title the following season.

In September 2015, the Bermuda Cricket Board announced that the position of head coach, at the time held by Arnold Manders, would be made vacant, with Manders and any other candidates invited to apply. It was announced in December that Smith would be given the role, with his first major assignment to be the 2016 World Cricket League Division Four tournament.

Smith resigned as coach of Bermuda in October 2018.

== Personal life ==
Clay is the father of Bermudan footballer Jonté Smith and brother of Wendell Smith.
