= Jonté Smith =

Bermudan footballer and cricketer

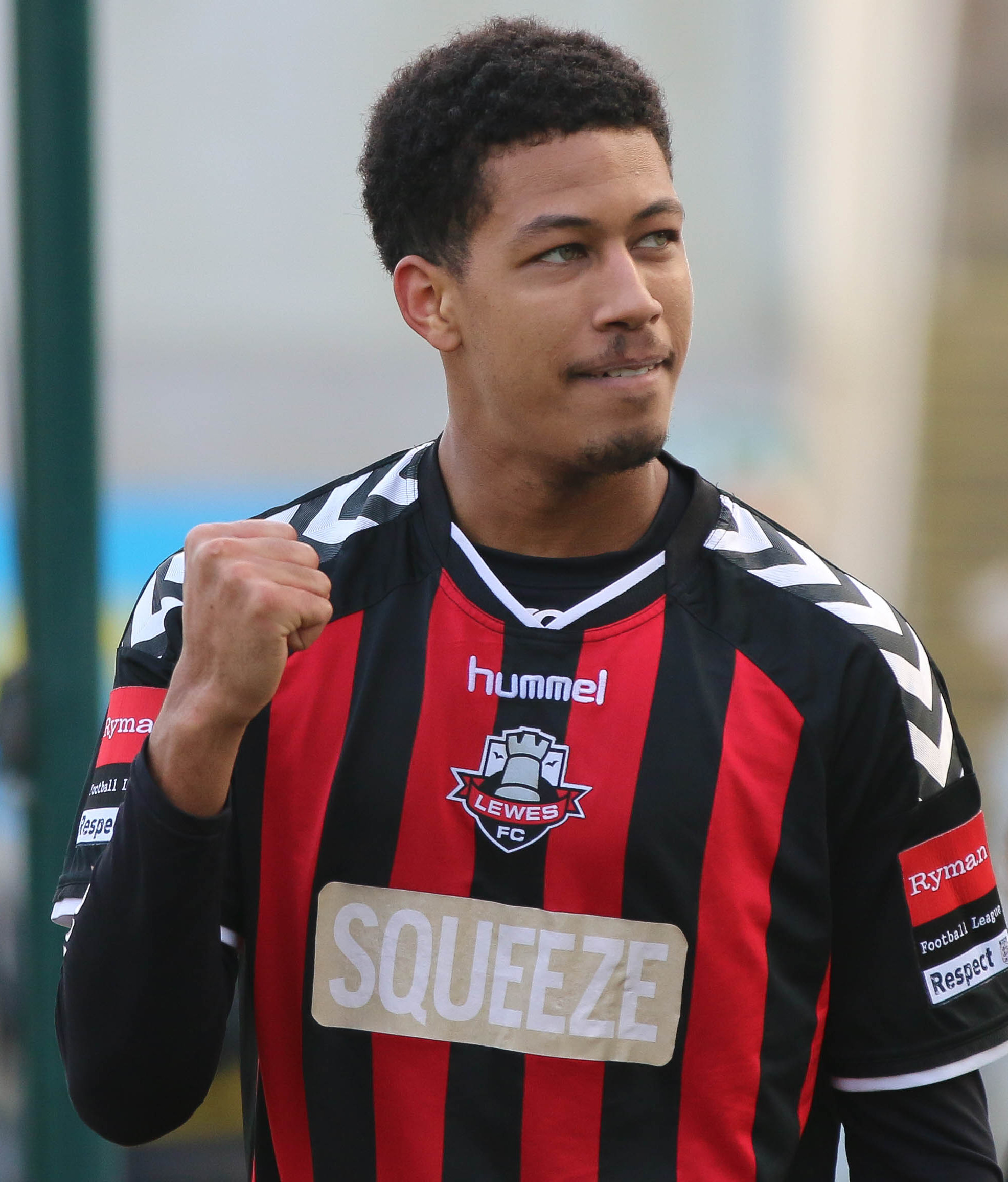
- Smith playing for Lewes in 2016

Personal information
- Full name: Jonté Jahki Smith
- Date of birth: 10 July 1994 (age 32)
- Place of birth: Hamilton, Bermuda
- Height: 6 ft 2 in (1.88 m)
- Position: Forward

Youth career
- –2010: North Village Rams
- 2010–2011: Sutton United

Senior career*
Years	Team	Apps	(Gls)
2011	Sutton United	0	(0)
2011–2014	Crawley Town	4	(0)
2012	→ Metropolitan Police (loan)	11	(12)
2013	→ Eastbourne Borough (loan)	7	(1)
2013	→ Havant & Waterlooville (loan)	4	(0)
2013	→ Metropolitan Police (loan)	3	(0)
2014	→ Gosport Borough (loan)	2	(0)
2014	→ PS Kemi Kings (loan)	12	(11)
2014–2015	PS Kemi	14	(11)
2015	Flekkerøy	10	(1)
2015	Gloucester City	9	(1)
2016	Lewes	14	(9)
2016	Welling United	3	(0)
2016	→ Cray Wanderers (loan)	4	(2)
2016	→ Lewes (loan)	2	(0)
2016–2019	Lewes	85	(35)
2019	Oxford United	1	(0)
2019–2020	Cheltenham Town	11	(1)
2021	Woking	12	(0)
2021–2022	Ballymena United	14	(2)

International career^{‡}
2010	Bermuda U17	4	(0)
2015–	Bermuda	15	(2)
- Cricket career
Cricket information
- Batting: Right-handed
- Bowling: Right-arm medium
- Role: Bowler
International information
- National side: Bermuda (2024–present)
- T20I debut (cap 40): 2 December 2024 v Argentina
- Last T20I: 16 December 2024 v Cayman Islands
Career statistics
Competition	T20I
Matches	6
Runs scored	12
Batting average	6.00
100s/50s	0/0
Top score	12
Catches/stumpings	2/–
- Source: ESPNcricinfo, 29 January 2025
- * Club domestic league appearances and goals as of 23:32, 13 June 2022 (UTC) ‡ National team caps and goals as of 15:46, 1 October 2021 (UTC)

Jonté Jahki Smith (born 10 July 1994) is a Bermudian footballer and cricketer who last played as a forward for NIFL Premiership club Ballymena United and currently plays for the Bermuda cricket team as a bowler after making his debut in December 2024.

== Career ==
Smith started his career with North Village Rams in Bermuda before moving to England in search of a career as a professional footballer. He earned his first professional contract in August with Sutton United. After a prolific season with the under-18s, he joined Crawley Town in August 2011 despite having not appeared in the Sutton first team. Smith scored his first senior goal in Crawley's pre-season game against Bromley, a 3–2 win in July 2012.

He enjoyed a prolific loan spell with Metropolitan Police in the first three months of the 2012–13 season, scoring 24 goals. It earned him promotion to the Crawley first-team squad and he made his debut as a substitute in a 3–0 defeat to Bournemouth on 29 December 2012 – one of four appearances on the bench during Crawley's 2012–13 campaign. He finished the season on loan at Conference South club Eastbourne Borough before signing a new one-year contract with Crawley at the end of the 2012–13 season.

On 13 March 2013, Smith joined Eastbourne Borough on an initial one–month loan. On 10 September 2013, Smith was again loaned out by his club, this time to Conference South side Havant & Waterlooville on a month's loan. In October 2013 he returned to Crawley, only to be loaned out for the second time to Metropolitan Police.

In January 2014, Smith was loaned to Conference South club Gosport Borough.

On 13 March 2014, Smith joined Finnish side PS Kemi Kings on loan until 30 June 2014 with a view to a permanent move. He made the move permanent at the end of the loan spell. In March 2015 he left Finland and followed his former head coach Tommy Taylor to Norwegian side Flekkerøy in the 2. divisjon.

On 18 September 2015, Smith joined National League North side Gloucester City. On 22 December, after 14 appearances and four goals in all competitions, Smith left the club.

On 23 January 2016 he marked his debut for Lewes with two goals in a 3–1 win at home to Canvey Island, only hours after the club announced they secured his signature on a non-contract basis.

He joined Welling United in May 2016 and spent the first month of the 2016–17 season on loan at Cray Wanderers, making his debut at Guernsey. In October 2016 he was loaned out to Lewes, initially for a month. He returned on a permanent contract on 19 November 2016, as he helped The Rooks draw 2–2 at Molesey.

In January 2019 he moved to Oxford United. He made his first-team debut as an injury-time substitute in a 1–0 away victory over Blackpool in League One on 23 February 2019.

On 3 September 2019, Smith joined League Two side Cheltenham Town on a deal until January 2020. On 8 October 2019, he scored a hat-trick, his first goals for the club, in an EFL Trophy tie against West Ham United U21. His contract was later extended until the end of the season, but he was released by the club at the end of the season.

On 15 January 2021, Smith joined National League side, Woking. On 18 June 2021, it was announced that Smith would leave the club at this end of his contract, with the striker failing to score in his 15 appearances for The Cards.

On 17 September 2021, Smith made the move to Northern Ireland to join Ballymena United and went onto make his debut a day later during a 1–1 draw with Glenavon, playing the full 90 minutes. On 9 June 2022, it was announced Smith would leave the club upon the expiry of his contract.

== Personal life ==
Jonté is the son of Bermudan cricketer Clay Smith.

== Career statistics ==
=== Club ===
As of match played 30 April 2022

Appearances and goals by club, season and competition
Club	Season	League			National cup		League cup		Other		Total	
Club	Season	Division	Apps	Goals	Apps	Goals	Apps	Goals	Apps	Goals	Apps	Goals
Sutton United	2011–12	Conference South	0	0	0	0	—		0	0	0	0
Crawley Town	2011–12	League Two	0	0	0	0	0	0	0	0	0	0
Crawley Town	2012–13	League One	4	0	—		0	0	0	0	4	0
Crawley Town	2013–14	League One	0	0	0	0	0	0	0	0	0	0
Crawley Town	Total		4	0	0	0	0	0	0	0	4	0
Metropolitan Police (loan)	2012–13	Isthmian League Premier Division	11	12	5	10	—		3 (Note: Appearances in the FA Trophy)	2	19	24
Eastbourne Borough (loan)	2012–13	Conference South	7	1	—		—		—		7	1
Havant & Waterlooville (loan)	2013–14	Conference South	4	0	0	0	—		0	0	4	0
Metropolitan Police (loan)	2013–14	Isthmian League Premier Division	3	0	—		—		3 (Note: Two appearances in the FA Trophy, one appearance and one goal in the Alan Turvey Trophy)	1	6	1
Gosport Borough (loan)	2013–14	Conference South	2	0	—		—		—		2	0
PS Kemi (loan)	2014	Kakkonen	12	11	0	0	—		—		12	11
PS Kemi	2014	Kakkonen	14	11	—		—		2 (Note: Appearances in the Kakkonen play-offs)	0	16	11
Flekkerøy	2015	2. divisjon	10	1	1	0	—		—		11	1
Gloucester City	2015–16	National League North	9	1	3	3	—		2	0	14	4
Lewes	2015–16	Isthmian League Premier Division	14	9	—		—		—		14	9
Welling United	2016–17	National League South	3	0	—		—		—		3	0
Cray Wanderers (loan)	2016–17	Isthmian League Division One South	4	2	1	0	—		—		5	2
Lewes (loan)	2016–17	Isthmian League Division One South	2	0	—		—		1	0	3	0
Lewes	2016–17	Isthmian League Division One South	22	11	—		—		—		22	11
Lewes	2017–18	Isthmian League South Division	37	16	1	0	—		3	0	41	16
Lewes	2018–19	Isthmian League Premier Division	26	8	4	3	—		4	1	34	12
Lewes	Total		85	35	5	3	—		7	1	97	39
Oxford United	2018–19	League One	1	0	—		—		—		1	0
Cheltenham Town	2019–20	League Two	12	1	3	0	0	0	3 (Note: One appearance and three goals in the EFL Trophy, two appearances in the League Two play-offs)	3	18	4
Woking	2020–21	National League	12	0	—		—		3	0	15	0
Ballymena United	2021–22	NIFL Premiership	14	2	0	0	1	2	—		15	4
Career total			223	85	18	16	1	2	24	7	266	110

=== International ===
Scores and results list Bermuda's goal tally first.

#	Date	Venue	Opponent	Score	Result	Competition
1.	22 March 2016	Estadio Pedro Marrero, Havana, Cuba	Cuba	1–2	1–2	2017 Caribbean Cup qualification
2.	9 September 2018	Ergilio Hato Stadium, Willemstad, Curaçao	Aruba	1–2	1–3	2019–20 CONCACAF Nations League qualification
Last updated 9 September 2018
