= Malachi Jones (cricketer) =

Bermudian cricketer (born 1989)

Personal information
- Full name: Malachi Olin Jones
- Born: 26 June 1989 (age 37); Bermuda
- Batting: Right-handed
- Bowling: Right-arm medium-fast

International information
- National side: Bermuda (2006-present)
- ODI debut (cap 19): 11 November 2006 v Kenya
- Last ODI: 28 October 2007 v Kenya
- T20I debut (cap 20): 13 August 2019 v United States
- Last T20I: 4 March 2023 v Bahamas

Career statistics
Competition	ODI	T20I	FC	LA
Matches	12	12	5	20
Runs scored	113	88	95	241
Batting average	11.30	14.66	10.55	14.17
100s/50s	–/–	–/–	–/–	–/–
Top score	27	27	24	38
Balls bowled	458	174	702	715
Wickets	8	8	11	13
Bowling average	60.25	25.00	42.00	56.00
5 wickets in innings	–	–	–	–
10 wickets in match	–	–	–	–
Best bowling	2/25	2/9	4/84	2/25
Catches/stumpings	5/–	1/–	1/–	8/–
- Source: Cricinfo, 24 February 2023

Malachi Olin Jones (born 26 June 1989) is a Bermudian cricketer. He is a right-handed batsman and a right-arm medium-fast bowler. He has played twelve One Day Internationals to date for Bermuda. He also represented Bermuda in the 2006 ICC Americas Championship and at the 2007 Cricket World Cup.

His most memorable moment came when he dismissed India's Robin Uthappa, caught by slip fieldsman Dwayne Leverock, with his first ball of the 2007 World Cup, becoming only the second player to take a wicket with his first World Cup delivery (the first being Australia's Ian Harvey at the 2003 event).

== Career ==
Malachi made his ODI debut in 2006 against Kenya and won the best young player award in 2006 during the end of Bermuda's domestic competition. He was included in Bermuda squad for the 2007 Cricket World Cup at the age of 17 which also made his maiden appearance in a World Cup tournament. He played in his first world cup match against India and took a wicket very first ball of his spell. However, he ended up the match with expensive bowling figures of 1/74 after sending down seven overs. It also eventually turned out to be his only World Cup match. He was then picked in the Bermuda U19 team for the 2008 Under-19 Cricket World Cup. He was also part of the Bermuda team during the intercontinental shield competition in 2009–10.

On 31 May 2010 Malachi Jones was removed from the Bermuda national cricket team after he breached a protocol that prohibited National players from playing for their Domestic clubs on 30 May 2010, a scheduled rest day. Bermuda was hosting the WCL Americas Region Division One tournament and would complete the competition with 13 players.

David Moore, Bermuda's coach, said: "I am extremely disappointed and surprised that one player would not only let the team down but Bermuda as well. The purpose of the rest day is recover and regenerate from injuries to be able to continue in the tournament at optimum level. I would like to personally thank all clubs for supporting the national team and following Board directive. International cricket is very important for the future of Bermuda cricket and we can not improve without the partnership and co-operation of all involved."

The Bermuda Cricket Board president Reginald Pearman added: "On behalf of the Board we are extremely disappointed to note this development and we agree and support the coach and team management's decision that the appropriate action has been taken." On 15 November 2013, made his T20 debut against Scotland during the 2013 ICC World Twenty20 Qualifier.

In August 2019, he was named in Bermuda's squad for the Regional Finals of the 2018–19 ICC T20 World Cup Americas Qualifier tournament. He made his Twenty20 International (T20I) debut for Bermuda against the United States on 18 August 2019. In September 2019, he was named in Bermuda's squad for the 2019 ICC T20 World Cup Qualifier tournament in the United Arab Emirates.

In October 2021, he was named in Bermuda's squad for the 2021 ICC Men's T20 World Cup Americas Qualifier tournament in Antigua. In May 2022, he was named in Bermuda's side for the 2022 Uganda Cricket World Cup Challenge League B tournament.
