= List of Bermuda ODI cricketers =

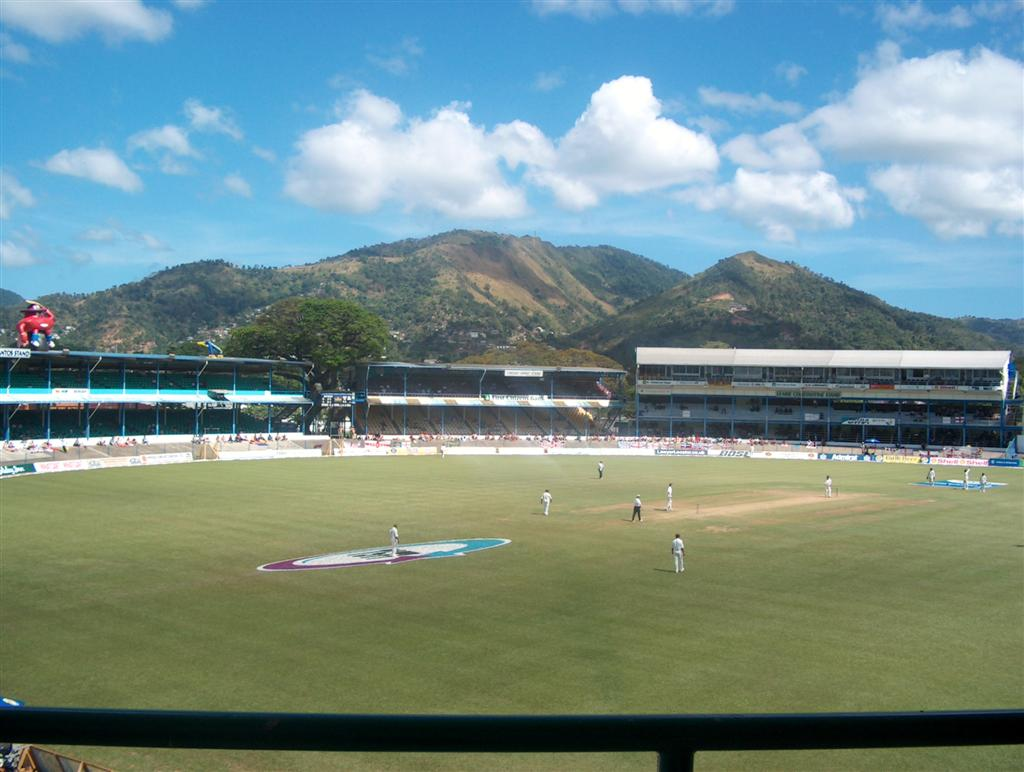
Bermuda recorded the largest margin of defeat in a World Cup match against India at Queen's Park Oval (pictured), losing by 257 runs in the 2007 World Cup.

From their first match in 2006 to their final match in 2009, 37 players represented the Bermuda cricket team in One Day Internationals (ODIs). A One Day International is an international cricket match between two representative teams, each having ODI status, as determined by the International Cricket Council (ICC). An ODI differs from Test matches in that the number of overs per side is limited, and that each team has only one innings.

The Bermuda Cricket Board (BCB) was formed in 1948, when the Somers Isles Cricket League amalgamated with the Bermuda Cricket Club to form the BCB. They were admitted to the ICC as an associate member in 1969, and in the 2005 ICC Trophy they gained ODI status and qualified for the World Cup for the first time. Bermuda played its first ODI against Canada in May 2006. In the 2007 World Cup, Bermuda struggled against the Test playing nations in their group, and against India they recorded what was until March 2015 the largest margin of defeat in a World Cup match, losing by 257 runs at Queen's Park Oval in Trinidad. Bermuda lost all their matches in the World Cup, which began a decline in Bermudian cricket, culminating in them losing their ODI status during the 2009 World Cup Qualifier, having finished ninth. As of 2026, Bermuda have not managed to regain their ODI status.

In total, Bermuda played 38 ODIs. Irving Romaine is the most capped player, appearing in 35 ODIs, and has scored more runs than any other Bermudian with 783. Dean Minors acted as wicket-keeper in twenty of the country's ODI fixtures. Two individual century scores have been made by Bermudian batsman in ODIs, with Romaine and David Hemp making one each; Hemp's score of 102 not out against Kenya in 2009 is the highest. Dwayne Leverock has claimed more wickets in ODI matches than any other Bermudian, having taken 34. Three players have captained Bermuda in ODIs: Janeiro Tucker, Romaine, and Dwight Basden. Tucker captained the team in three matches in 2006, winning once and losing twice. Romaine captained the team in 31 matches from 2006 to 2009, winning six and losing 25, whilst Basden captained the team in a single match against the Netherlands in 2007, which Bermuda lost.

This list includes all players who have played at least one ODI match and is initially arranged in the order of debut appearance. Where more than one player won their first cap in the same match, those players are initially listed alphabetically at the time of debut.

== Key ==
General

- ‡ – Captain
- † – Wicket-keeper
- First – Year of debut
- Last – Year of latest game
- Mat – Number of matches played
- Win% – Winning percentage

Batting

- Runs – Runs scored in career
- HS – Highest score
- 100 – Centuries scored
- 50 – Half-centuries scored
- Avg – Runs scored per dismissal
- * – Batsman remained not out

Bowling

- Balls – Balls bowled in career
- Wkt – Wickets taken in career
- BBI – Best bowling in an innings
- Ave – Average runs per wicket
- 5WI – Five wickets or more in a match

Fielding

- Ca – Catches taken
- St – Stumpings taken

== Players ==
Statistics are correct as of the Bermuda's most recent ODI, against the Netherlands on 8 April 2009.

Bermuda ODI cricketers
General					Batting					Bowling					Fielding		Ref
No.	Name	First	Last	Mat	Runs	HS	Avg	100	50	Balls	Wkt	BBI	Ave	5WI	Ca	St	Ref
1	Lionel Cann	2006	2009	26	590	52	26.81	0	1	100	1	1/34	129.00	0	9	0	
2	Hasan Durham	2006	2006	9	35	11	8.75	0	0	400	12	4/45	28.58	0	5	0	
3	Dwayne Leverock	2006	2009	32	111	20*	11.10	0	0	1684	34	5/53	33.02	1	10	0	
4	Dean Minors †	2006	2007	20	478	68	26.55	0	3	–	–	–	–	–	16	4	
5	Daniel Morgan	2006	2006	2	2	1	1.00	0	0	–	–	–	–	–	0	0	
6	Saleem Mukuddem	2006	2007	20	331	57	23.64	0	1	960	23	4/40	32.69	0	8	0	
7	George O'Brien	2006	2008	9	38	16	5.42	0	0	456	15	3/31	27.00	0	1	0	
8	Azeem Pitcher	2006	2007	4	36	30	9.00	0	0	–	–	–	–	–	1	0	
9	Irving Romaine ‡	2006	2009	35	783	101	25.25	1	4	326	10	2/22	35.50	0	8	0	
10	Janeiro Tucker ‡	2006	2009	26	496	52	19.84	0	1	819	13	2/23	53.92	0	9	0	
11	Kwame Tucker †	2006	2007	12	95	34	9.50	0	0	–	–	–	–	–	9	1	
12	Treadwell Gibbons	2006	2006	2	33	33	16.50	0	0	–	–	–	–	–	0	0	
13	Kevin Hurdle	2006	2007	19	85	22	10.62	0	0	905	23	3/24	36.13	0	7	0	
14	Ryan Steede	2006	2008	8	70	20	11.66	0	0	312	5	1/21	51.40	0	0	0	
15	Delyone Borden	2006	2008	12	98	24	14.00	0	0	411	15	4/30	26.13	0	2	0	
16	Steven Outerbridge	2006	2009	23	336	56	14.60	0	1	120	1	1/11	94.00	0	6	0	
17	Clay Smith	2006	2007	12	192	52	16.00	0	1	–	–	–	–	–	3	0	
18	David Hemp	2006	2009	22	641	102*	33.73	1	4	114	1	1/25	119.00	0	7	0	
19	Malachi Jones	2006	2007	12	113	27	11.30	0	0	458	8	2/25	60.25	0	5	0	
20	Stefan Kelly	2006	2009	10	14	7*	–	0	0	389	14	3/36	26.50	0	3	0	
21	Arthur Pitcher	2007	2007	3	20	12	6.66	0	0	79	0	–	–	–	0	0	
22	Oliver Pitcher	2007	2007	5	72	30	14.40	0	0	15	0	–	–	–	2	0	
23	Dwight Basden ‡	2007	2007	2	12	7	6.00	0	0	–	–	–	–	–	0	0	
24	James Celestine	2007	2008	8	60	20	7.50	0	0	–	–	–	–	–	2	0	
25	Jekon Edness †	2007	2008	11	252	72	28.00	0	1	–	–	–	–	–	7	4	
26	Jacobi Robinson	2007	2009	3	27	17	13.50	0	0	138	1	1/57	170.00	0	1	0	
27	Chris Lonsdale	2007	2007	1	4	4	4.00	0	0	12	0	–	–	–	0	0	
28	Rodney Trott	2007	2009	11	130	48*	21.66	0	0	537	16	4/46	25.75	0	4	0	
29	Kyle Hodsoll	2007	2008	3	2	2*	2.00	0	0	102	3	2/48	33.33	0	1	0	
30	Oronde Bascome	2008	2008	6	65	20	10.83	0	0	18	0	–	–	–	3	0	
31	Chris Foggo	2008	2008	4	106	60	26.50	0	1	1	0	–	–	–	3	0	
32	Tamauri Tucker	2008	2009	5	–	–	–	–	–	174	7	4/56	22.42	0	2	0	
33	Dennico Hollis	2008	2008	1	15	15*	–	0	0	42	0	–	–	–	0	0	
34	McLaren Smith	2008	2008	1	–	–	–	0	0	12	0	–	–	–	0	0	
35	Chris Douglas	2008	2008	2	122	69	61.00	0	2	–	–	–	–	–	0	0	
36	Glenn Blakeney	2009	2009	2	72	42	36.00	0	0	–	–	–	–	–	0	0	
37	Fiqre Crockwell †	2009	2009	2	68	45	34.00	0	0	–	–	–	–	–	0	0	
37	Kevon Fubler	2009	2009	1	15	15	34.00	0	0	27	3	3/15	9	0	0	0	

== See also ==
- One Day International
- Bermuda national cricket team
- List of Bermuda Twenty20 International cricketers
