= Rodney Trott =

Bermudian cricketer (born 1987)

Personal information
- Full name: Rodney Jamel Omar Trott
- Born: 8 September 1987 (age 39); Bermuda
- Batting: Right-handed
- Bowling: Right-arm off break

International information
- National side: Bermuda (2007-present)
- ODI debut (cap 28): 25 October 2007 v Kenya
- Last ODI: 8 April 2009 v Netherlands
- T20I debut (cap 11): 3 August 2008 v Scotland
- Last T20I: 14 November 2021 v Argentina

Career statistics
Competition	ODI	T20I	FC	LA
Matches	11	21	10	25
Runs scored	130	57	213	239
Batting average	21.66	9.50	11.83	15.93
100s/50s	–/–	–/–	–/–	–/–
Top score	48*	19	43	48*
Balls bowled	537	388	1,589	1332
Wickets	16	17	28	44
Bowling average	25.75	22.82	30.78	21.40
5 wickets in innings	–	–	1	–
10 wickets in match	–	–	–	–
Best bowling	4/46	4/15	5/39	4/30
Catches/stumpings	4/–	2/–	7/–	7/–
- Source: Cricinfo, 29 November 2022

Rodney Jamel Omar Trott (born 8 September 1987) is a Bermudian cricketer.

A right-handed batsman and a right-arm off-break bowler, he has played first-class and One Day International cricket for Bermuda. Trott made his first-class debut in the 2006 ICC Intercontinental Cup against the Netherlands in November 2006.

In August 2008, Trott became the youngest ever captain in the history of T20I (at the age of 20 years and 332 days).

In August 2019, he was named in Bermuda's squad for the Regional Finals of the 2018–19 ICC T20 World Cup Americas Qualifier tournament. In September 2019, he was named in Bermuda's squad for the 2019 ICC T20 World Cup Qualifier tournament in the United Arab Emirates. In November 2019, he was named as the vice-captain of Bermuda's squad for the Cricket World Cup Challenge League B tournament in Oman.

In October 2021, he was named as the vice-captain of Bermuda's squad for the 2021 ICC Men's T20 World Cup Americas Qualifier tournament in Antigua.
