= Steven Outerbridge =

Bermudian cricketer (born 1983)

Personal information
- Full name: Steven Davonne Outerbridge
- Born: 20 May 1983 (age 43); Paget, Bermuda
- Batting: Left-handed
- Bowling: Right-arm off break

International information
- National side: Bermuda (2006-2009)
- ODI debut (cap 16): 19 August 2006 v Canada
- Last ODI: 8 April 2009 v Netherlands
- T20I debut (cap 8): 3 August 2008 v Scotland
- Last T20I: 5 August 2008 v Canada

Career statistics
Competition	ODI	T20I	FC	LA
Matches	23	3	12	31
Runs scored	338	49	706	676
Batting average	14.69	24.50	30.69	22.53
100s/50s	0/1	0/0	1/6	1/3
Top score	56	37*	113	107
Balls bowled	111	–	111	300
Wickets	2	–	2	4
Bowling average	32.00	–	32.00	71.50
5 wickets in innings	0	–	0	0
10 wickets in match	0	–	0	0
Best bowling	1/14	–	1/14	1/11
Catches/stumpings	6/–	1/–	4/–	10/–
- Source: Cricinfo, 4 January 2010

Steven Devonne Outerbridge (born 20 May 1983) is a former Bermudian cricketer. He was a left-handed batsman and a right-arm off-break bowler. He played for Bermuda in 23 One Day Internationals, making his debut at this level against Canada in August 2006. He also represented Bermuda in ICC Intercontinental Cup matches and the ICC Americas Championship in 2004 and 2006. In the 2006 English cricket season he played several matches for Cardiff UCCE.

In April 2018, he was named in Bermuda's squad for the 2018 ICC World Cricket League Division Four tournament in Malaysia. He had last represented Bermuda in 2013.
