= Lionel Cann =

Bermudian cricketer

Personal information
- Full name: Lionel Olvin Bernard Cann
- Born: 3 October 1972 (age 54); Bermuda
- Batting: Right-handed
- Bowling: Right arm medium

International information
- National side: Bermuda
- ODI debut (cap 1): 17 May 2006 v Canada
- Last ODI: 27 October 2014 v Singapore

Career statistics
Competition	ODI	FC	LA	T20
Matches	26	5	48	2
Runs scored	590	183	1025	5
Batting average	26.81	20.33	27.70	2.50
100s/50s	0/1	0/0	0/3	0/0
Top score	52	48	53	5
Balls bowled	100	66	256	–
Wickets	1	1	6	–
Bowling average	129.00	39.00	45.83	–
5 wickets in innings	0	0	0	–
10 wickets in match	0	0	0	–
Best bowling	1/34	1/11	2/38	–
Catches/stumpings	9/–	2/–	13/–	0/–
- Source: Cricinfo, 5 January 2025

Lionel Olvin Bernard Cann (born 3 October 1972) is a retired Bermudian cricketer. During his 35 year career, he scored over 1,000 runs in Cup Match. He is an aggressive right-handed middle order batsman and a right-arm medium pace bowler. In his 22 ODI games to date, he has struck 28 sixes. He has also represented Bermuda in ICC Intercontinental Cup matches, the ICC Americas Championship in 2004 and 2006, and the Stanford 20/20 in 2006.

Cann was a member of the Bermudian side which made the semi-finals of the 2005 ICC Trophy which earned them qualification for the 2007 World Cup. He made his One Day International debut against Canada on 17 May 2006, making 32 not out to guide the country to their first ever victory in ODI cricket.

In the ICC World Cricket League Division One tournament in Kenya prior to the World Cup he played a big part in Bermuda's only win, scoring an unbeaten 49 against Scotland as they chased 269 with an over to spare. His innings was part of a 134 run partnership with Irving Romaine, a national record.

After being either unbeaten or dismissed in the 40s on six occasions, Cann finally made an ODI half century in 2007 when he scored a 32-ball 52 against Kenya.

He made just 34 runs in the World Cup, 28 of those coming in the match against Sri Lanka, where Cann top-scored for his team.
