= Saleem Mukuddem =

Bermudian cricketer (born 1972)

Personal information
- Born: 20 January 1972 (age 54); South Africa
- Batting: Right-handed
- Bowling: Right-arm medium

International information
- National side: Bermuda (2006–2007)
- ODI debut (cap 6): 17 May 2006 v Canada
- Last ODI: 25 March 2007 v Bangladesh

Career statistics
Competition	ODI	FC	LA	T20
Matches	20	8	27	1
Runs scored	331	262	397	6
Batting average	23.64	21.83	19.85	6.00
100s/50s	0/1	0/2	0/1	0/0
Top score	57	90	57	6
Balls bowled	960	1,008	1,296	12
Wickets	23	23	32	0
Bowling average	32.69	24.65	30.50	–
5 wickets in innings	0	1	0	–
10 wickets in match	0	0	0	–
Best bowling	4/40	6/50	4/40	–
Catches/stumpings	8/–	9/–	11/–	0/–
- Source: CricketArchive, 1 November 2017

Saleem Mukuddem (born 20 January 1972) is a South African-born Bermudian former cricketer who played twenty One Day Internationals for the Bermuda national cricket team.

== International career ==
He played in Bermuda's first ever One Day International, a match against Canada on 17 May 2006, taking two wickets. Three days later, Mukuddem scored 25 runs against Zimbabwe, although this was not enough, as Zimbabwe eventually won by 83 runs.

Mukuddem has played in all eight of Bermuda's ICC Intercontinental Cup games, the 2005 ICC Trophy, the ICC Americas Championship in 2004 and 2006 and the 2006 Stanford 20/20.

He announced his retirement from international cricket at the end of the 2007 Cricket World Cup.

== Post-retirement ==
In 2014, he was appointed interim chief executive officer of Eastern Province Cricket Board.
