= Dwayne Leverock =

Bermudian cricketer (born 1971)

Personal information
- Full name: Russell Dwayne Mark Leverock
- Born: 14 July 1971 (age 55); Bermuda
- Nickname: Sluggo
- Batting: Right-handed
- Bowling: Slow left arm orthodox
- Role: Bowler
- Relatives: Kamau Leverock (nephew)

International information
- National side: Bermuda (2006–2009)
- ODI debut: 17 May 2006 v Canada
- Last ODI: 8 April 2009 v Netherlands
- T20I debut: 3 August 2008 v Scotland
- Last T20I: 5 August 2008 v Ireland

Career statistics
Competition	ODI	T20I	FC	LA
Matches	32	2	15	44
Runs scored	112	–	349	126
Batting average	11.20	–	17.45	11.45
100s/50s	0/0	–	0/2	0/0
Top score	20*	–	52	20*
Balls bowled	1,684	30	4,115	2,308
Wickets	34	0	71	47
Bowling average	33.02	–	26.47	32.27
5 wickets in innings	1	–	6	1
10 wickets in match	0	–	2	0
Best bowling	5/53	–	7/57	5/53
Catches/stumpings	10/–	0/–	12/–	15/–
- Source: CricInfo, 27 April 2019

Russell Dwayne Mark Leverock (born 14 July 1971) is a Bermudian former cricketer. He also served as a policeman and prison van driver. He was popularly nicknamed by his teammates as "Sluggo" during his playing days.

Living above an Indian restaurant in Bermuda, Leverock worked as a jailer during his time on the team. At the 2007 Cricket World Cup he was the largest player to grace the pitch, weighing in at 20 stone (280 pounds or 127 kg). However he is not regarded as the heaviest man to ever play international cricket. West Indies right-arm off-break bowler Rahkeem Cornwall weighs over 140 kg and Warwick Armstrong weighed about 22 stone. Leverock's most memorable moment came during the group stage match against India, where he took a one-handed stunning, diving catch which became one of the talking points during the tournament and was praised globally. His catch at 2007 Cricket World Cup is regarded as one of the greatest catches of all time.

== Police career ==
In March 1989, he joined the Bermuda Police Service as a Cadet. He also went onto serve in different units within the Bermuda Police Service including Police Task Force, Prosecutions Department, Central Station Jailor, Eastern and Central Patrol Divisions. As of 2021, he was working as a Police Dispatcher in the Operations Centre, Prospect. Bermuda Police Service confirmed that constable Leverock was a recipient of Police Long Service Awards. He has also represented Bermuda Police Service in several international soccer competitions including North American Police Soccer Championships.

== Playing career ==
He played an instrumental role in Bermuda's dream run at the 2005 ICC Trophy which guaranteed Bermuda a spot for the 2007 Cricket World Cup. He took nine wickets at the 2005 ICC Trophy which also included a crucial four-wicket haul against United States of America which propelled Bermuda to an emphatic win by a margin of 113 runs and also helped Bermuda to secure its place for the 2007 World Cup in the West Indies.

Leverock made his debut representing the Bermudian cricket team in Bermuda's first ever One Day International when they played Canada on 17 May 2006 and the match was part of a triangular series which also involved Zimbabwe. Leverock claimed one of Canada's wickets as Bermuda won the game by three wickets under the Duckworth-Lewis method. Leverock made an impressive ODI debut by ending his figures conceding only 14 runs in a 10 over spell. He has since gone onto play for Bermuda in 11 ODIs, and picked up the first five wicket haul by a Bermudian bowler in ODIs, when he took 5/53 against Kenya which he achieved by opening the bowling, no mean feat for a spin bowler. He registered the five-wicket haul during the third and final ODI between Kenya and Bermuda which was played in Kenyan soil in November 2006 albeit in a heavy loss to Kenya. It was also the first official five-wicket haul by a bowler for Bermuda in international cricket and his fifer also included the prized wicket of Kenyan captain Steve Tikolo who took the game away from Bermuda with a magnificent century. Despite Bermuda having lost the series 3–0, Leverock provided some respite on the tour by being the joint wicket-taker of the series alongside Kenya's Thomas Odoyo with seven scalps.

He has also represented Bermuda in all eight of their ICC Intercontinental Cup matches to date, with a best of 7/57 against the USA in 2004. He also played in the 2005 ICC Trophy, the ICC Americas Championship in 2004 and 2006, and in the 2006 Stanford 20/20. As a batsman, Leverock made his first half-century against the Netherlands in the 2006 ICC Intercontinental Cup, including 8 fours, and shared in a 132-run partnership with Glamorgan captain David Hemp. He scored 51 runs after facing 119 deliveries before being given out after an appeal for leg before wicket off the bowling of Peter Borren. It was reported that he "enjoyed his time at the crease so much that he expressed dissent when he was given out lbw, and was consequently fined for the action.". He made his second half-century (also 51) against the Netherlands in the 2007–08 ICC Intercontinental Cup, which included some powerful straight fours.

=== 2007 Cricket World Cup ===
In a warm up game against England, as preparation for the 2007 Cricket World Cup, Leverock took the wickets of Paul Collingwood and notably Kevin Pietersen, his 10 over spell returning figures of 2 for 32 and resulting in Leverock attaining a cult following around the world. Leverock noticed that Kevin Pietersen and Andrew Flintoff were both mocking and chuckling at some of the deliveries bowled by him which eventually propelled him to raise his bar. Leverock commented, "It was the first time I have played against a team like this. I settled into a rhythm, and when I settled, I took wickets. The wicket was turning a little bit". England captain Michael Vaughan was full of praise for Leverock's performance. "He bowled very well. Any spinner that drags Kevin Pietersen out of his crease, and does him in the flight, is a good bowler". Despite Leverock's solid efforts, England comfortably won the match by 241 runs.

Bermuda's debut World Cup match came against Sri Lanka during a group stage match and Leverock took the prized scalp of Sri Lanka wicket-keeper Kumar Sangakkara, but missed two opportunities to catch Sri Lanka captain, Mahela Jayawardene. Mahela Jayawardene made the most out of two costly dropped catches due to sloppy fielding from Dwayne Leverock by top scoring with a fluent knock of 85 which also marked his 35th career ODI half-century. Sri Lanka made 321 runs on the board for a loss of 6 wickets and Leverock's 10 overs cost 67 runs in the end. Bermuda went onto lose the game to Sri Lanka by a huge margin of 243 runs after being bowled out for just 78 runs.

Bermuda then played India in their second World Cup match which was played at Queen's Park Oval in Port of Spain on 19 March 2007. Leverock took a stunning, diving one-handed slip catch to dismiss Robin Uthappa off Malachi Jones' first ball in a Cricket World Cup match (the 2nd over of the game) against India, which triggered off wild celebrations. Malachi Jones delivered an outside off good length outswinger delivery which Robin Uthappa tried to dispatch that on the off side but ended up getting an educated edge which was cleanly taken by Dwayne Leverock who was in the slip cordon diving to his right to complete a fabulous catch. Leverock's catch defied stereotypes and odds as he was pity much overweight when he took a diving catch which was deemed by cricketing fraternity as an absolute screamer. His catch became talk of the town and it brought huge international recognition to Bermuda. England commentator David Lloyd who was one of the commentators for the match praised Leverock's effort by calling it as something which shook the earth. David Lloyd aggravated the emotions with his commentary "The big man, the fridge has opened! He’s flown like a gazelle". He soon became a cult hero in Bermuda following the iconic catch.

His one-handed catch against India received significant attention, particularly among cricket audiences in India, and contributed to increased public recognition during the tournament. The catch received attention among cricket fans in India during a World Cup campaign in which the Indian team lost matches to Bangladesh and Sri Lanka. After taking the catch, Leverock celebrated by blowing kisses toward the crowd and running around the ground. Leverock also took the wicket of Yuvraj Singh and celebrated with his trademark "jig". He conceded 96 runs in his 10 overs as India scored 413/5. Bermuda later scored 156 runs and lost the match by 257 runs. He also recorded the most expensive bowling figures by a Bermudian bowler in a World Cup match during the match against India and it was also one of the most expensive bowling figures in World Cup history.

He had a decent yet successful first-class cricket career having played 15 matches but ended up taking 71 scalps at a healthy average of 26.74 including six five-wicket hauls.

== Legacy ==
With the shock of the death of Bob Woolmer, British tabloid fury at Andrew Flintoff's drunken shenanigans and sub-continental unhappiness at underperforming superstars, Leverock became the feel-good hit of the 2007 Cricket World Cup. Bermuda coach Gus Logie, the former West Indies international, is an admirer of left-arm spinner Leverock. "He's big and because of that he attracts a lot of attention, but it does not deter him," Logie says. Dwayne's performances in the 2007 World Cup won him the Bermuda Sun Sports Personality of the Year for the second year running. Dwayne remarked that 2007 "has been a memorable year."

He also mentioned, "A lot of people do recognize me now, which surprised me. I noticed it most coming through Heathrow on our tour of Europe. English people, Indians, Sri Lankans, anyone who knew cricket seemed to recognize me." "Quite a few came up and asked for a picture or an autograph, which is a nice feeling."

In 2023, an American tourist who went by the name Ahsan Aadil Shaikh visited Bermuda on a vacation and went on a taxi to reach a port. The taxi driver named Jimmy learnt that Ahsan Aadil Shaikh is a cricket fan and apparently quizzed him about whether he has any idea about Bermuda having a national cricket team. Ahsan Aadil Shaikh was quick to respond to that question by saying how he vividly remembers about Bermuda's participation at 2007 Cricket World Cup and told about how he felt nostalgic about having watched the magnificent catch of Dwayne Leverock. The taxi driver was in disbelief as he was shocked to hear that Leverock was predominantly popularly outside the shores of Bermuda and the taxi driver immediately made arrangements to meet Dwayne Leverock and introduce Ahsan Aadil Shaikh to him. Ahsan Aadil Shaikh met Dwayne Leverock in an unexpected fashion and both of them went onto pose by standing in aposition similar to what Leverock did at iconic 2007 World Cup. The story about this was first posted by Ahsan Aadil Shaikh himself in Reddit under the subreddit called r/cricket and apparently the story was picked up by The Royal Gazette which is one of the prominent newspapers in Bermuda. The story became insanely popularly all over the world and Dwayne Leverock also signed the front cover page of The Royal Gazette where both Leverock and Ahsan Aadil Shaikh made headlines in the front-page news.

=== Retirement ===
Leverock announced his retirement from international cricket in April 2009 after Bermuda finished in a disappointing ninth place in the 2009 ICC World Cup Qualifier which resulted in the team losing its One Day International status and failing to qualify for the 2011 Cricket World Cup.

As Bermuda hasn't played any One Day Internationals since, Leverock remains its highest aggregate wicket-taker in the format, and his 5/53 is the best bowling figures recorded by a Bermudan bowler in the format.

== Other sports ==
Leverock previously played football with Bermudian team Zebras, where he was a striker. Leverock also plays golf.

In his younger days, Leverock was a hurdler for Bermuda, and once won a silver medal in a youth games in the Caribbean. He once stated that bowling to Kevin Pietersen was more difficult task than carrying prisoners, thugs and criminals off his van because of KP's unorthodox style of batting.

== Early life ==
He idolized Pakistan legspinner Abdul Qadir and Sri Lankan offspinner Muttiah Muralitharan while growing up. He pursued his interest in cricket through his uncles.
