= List of Bermuda Twenty20 International cricketers =

A Twenty20 International (T20I) is an international cricket match between two representative teams, each having T20I status, as determined by the International Cricket Council (ICC), and is played under the rules of Twenty20 cricket. The first T20I was played between Australia and New Zealand on 17 February 2005. Bermuda played their first T20I under the captaincy of Irving Romaine at the Civil Service Cricket Club, Stormont, Belfast, on 3 August 2008, against Scotland. This match was played during the 2009 ICC World Twenty20 Qualifier, which took place between 2–5 August 2008. Bermuda played a total of three matches during this tournament and lost them all, failing to qualify for the 2009 ICC World Twenty20. Bermuda later lost their T20I status after the 2009 World Cup Qualifier, in which they finished ninth. In April 2018, the ICC decided to grant full Twenty20 International (T20I) status to all its members. Therefore, all Twenty20 matches played between Bermuda and other ICC members after 1 January 2019 hold the T20I status.

The list is initially arranged in the order in which each player won his first Twenty20 cap. Where more than one player won his first Twenty20 cap in the same match, those players are listed alphabetically by surname.

== Key ==
General

- ‡ – Captain
- † – Wicket-keeper
- First – Year of debut
- Last – Year of latest game
- Mat – Number of matches played

Fielding

- Ca – Catches taken
- St – Stumpings taken

Batting

- Runs – Runs scored in career
- HS – Highest score
- Avg – Runs scored per dismissal
- * – Batsman remained not out
- 100 – Centuries scored
- 50 – Half-centuries scored

Bowling

- Balls – Balls bowled in career
- Wkt – Wickets taken in career
- BBI – Best bowling in an innings
- Ave – Average runs per wicket

== Players ==
Statistics are correct as of 27 September 2026.

Bermuda T20I cricketers
General					Batting					Bowling				Fielding		Ref
No.	Name	First	Last	Mat	Runs	HS	Avg	50	100	Balls	Wkt	BBI	Ave	Ca	St	Ref
1	James Celestine	2008	2008	3	19	7	3.00	0	0	–	–	–	–	0	0	
2	Jekon Edness†	2008	2008	3	13	9	4.33	0	0	–	–	–	–	0	1	
3	Chris Foggo	2008	2008	3	13	7	4.33	0	0	–	–	–	–	1	0	
4	David Hemp	2008	2008	2	20	20	10.00	0	0	–	–	–	–	0	0	
5	Stefan Kelly	2008	2008	3	13	11*	–	0	0	42	3	2/18	16.66	0	0	
6	Dwayne Leverock	2008	2008	2	–	–	–	–	–	30	0	–	–	0	0	
7	George O'Brien	2008	2019	11	32	7*	8.00	0	0	231	13	2/11	17.84	2	0	
8	Steven Outerbridge	2008	2008	3	49	37*	24.50	0	0	–	–	–	–	1	0	
9	Oliver Pitcher	2008	2008	3	34	15	11.33	0	0	6	0	–	–	2	0	
10	Irving Romaine ‡	2008	2008	2	9	8	4.50	0	0	22	2	2/2	10.50	1	0	
11	Rodney Trott‡	2008	2021	21	57	19	9.50	0	0	357	17	4/15	22.82	2	0	
12	Oronde Bascome	2008	2019	3	24	16	8.00	0	0	–	–	–	–	1	0	
13	Kyle Hodsoll	2008	2021	4	0	0	0.00	0	0	54	2	2/19	29.50	2	0	
14	Tamauri Tucker	2008	2008	1	1	1	1.00	0	0	12	0	–	–	0	0	
15	Okera Bascombe†	2019	2021	17	166	37	11.85	0	0	–	–	–	–	9	3	
16	Onias Bascombe	2019	2026	40	628	54	19.62	1	0	97	8	4/10	16.50	10	0	
17	Deunte Darrell	2019	2019	11	80	30*	8.88	0	0	12	0	–	–	4	0	
18	Allan Douglas	2019	2025	25	437	74	19.86	2	0	248	20	5/18	13.10	12	0	
19	Terryn Fray‡	2019	2026	47	573	62*	16.37	2	0	–	–	–	–	14	0	
20	Malachi Jones	2019	2023	18	116	27	19.33	0	0	314	15	3/23	19.86	5	0	
21	Kamau Leverock‡	2019	2026	29	917	103	33.96	4	1	538	29	4/28	20.82	15	0	
22	Justin Pitcher	2019	2023	9	10	5*	–	0	0	78	2	1/21	51.00	4	0	
23	Delray Rawlins‡	2019	2026	49	1,491	121	41.41	12	1	869	46	4/10	18.67	36	0	
24	Derrick Brangman	2019	2026	43	129	32*	12.90	0	0	825	60	5/19	12.46	6	0	
25	Sinclair Smith‡†	2019	2026	39	31	7*	4.42	0	0	–	–	–	–	12	9	
26	Macai Simmons	2019	2021	6	29	18*	9.66	0	0	13	0	–	–	0	0	
27	Dion Stovell ‡	2019	2024	20	231	49*	21.70	0	0	259	16	3/17	18.12	7	0	
28	Janeiro Tucker	2019	2019	5	94	50*	23.50	1	0	42	1	1/16	62.00	1	0	
29	Tre Manders	2021	2026	30	852	84	34.08	7	0	–	–	–	–	11	0	
30	Dominic Sabir	2021	2026	42	344	73*	16.38	1	0	480	39	4/21	11.89	23	0	
31	Zeko Burgess	2021	2026	33	87	19*	9.66	0	0	589	26	3/20	22.34	17	0	
32	Jabari Darrell	2021	2023	2	–	–	–	–	–	42	3	2/9	7.33	0	0	
33	Jarryd Richardson†	2023	2025	12	31	15	6.20	0	0	–	–	–	–	2	1	
34	Jacob Albertze	2023	2023	4	–	–	–	–	–	–	–	–	–	1	–	
35	Charles Trott	2023	2026	13	6	19	4.75	0	0	24	0	–	–	5	0	
36	Cejay Outerbridge	2023	2023	4	0	0	0.00	0	0	54	4	3/18	12.50	0	0	
37	Macquille Walker	2023	2023	1	–	–	–	–	–	18	1	1/23	23.00	0	0	
38	Alex Dore	2024	2025	15	200	33*	15.38	0	0	–	–	–	–	2	0	
39	Chare Smith	2024	2026	11	1	1	1.00	0	0	211	7	2/11	36.57	2	0	
40	Jonté Smith	2024	2026	15	37	16*	7.40	0	0	150	12	4/20	12.83	4	0	
41	Kevon Fubler	2024	2026	19	3	2*	3.00	0	0	317	24	3/4	9.83	7	0	
42	Jermal Proctor	2024	2026	13	5	5	2.50	0	0	221	10	2/20	23.30	3	0	
43	Marcus Scotland	2025	2025	7	123	57*	30.75	1	0	–	–	–	–	1	0	
44	Dalin Richardson	2025	2025	1	–	–	–	–	–	–	–	–	–	0	0	
45	Amari Ebbin	2026	2026	1	–	–	–	–	–	–	–	–	–	0	0	
46	Luke Horan	2026	2026	4	19	19*	–	0	0	48	5	4/13	4.60	2	0	
47	Isaiah O'Brien	2026	2026	8	89	43	29.66	0	0	6	0	–	–	3	0	
48	Nzari Paynter	2026	2026	2	–	–	–	–	–	24	2	2/15	7.50	0	0	
49	Zeri Tomlinson†	2026	2026	5	24	21	12.00	0	0	–	–	–	–	3	1	
50	Kwasi James	2026	2026	3	0	0	0.00	0	0	66	7	4/26	10.28	0	0	

== See also ==
- Twenty20 International
- Bermuda national cricket team
- List of Bermuda ODI cricketers
