= David Hemp =

Bermudian cricket coach and cricketer

Personal information
- Full name: David Lloyd Hemp
- Born: 8 November 1970 (age 56); Hamilton, Bermuda
- Height: 6 ft 1 in (1.85 m)
- Batting: Left-handed
- Bowling: Right arm medium
- Role: Batsman
- Relatives: Tim Hemp (brother)

International information
- National side: Bermuda (2006–2015)
- ODI debut (cap 18): 11 November 2006 v Kenya
- Last ODI: 8 April 2009 v Netherlands
- ODI shirt no.: 4

Domestic team information
- Years: Team
- 1991–1996: Glamorgan
- 1997–2001: Warwickshire
- 1997/1998: Free State
- 2002–2008: Glamorgan (squad no. 4)

Career statistics
Competition	ODI	T20I	FC	LA
Matches	22	2	271	309
Runs scored	641	20	15,520	6,844
Batting average	33.73	10.00	37.04	27.93
100s/50s	1/4	0/0	30/86	8/34
Top score	102*	20	247*	170*
Balls bowled	114	–	1,134	393
Wickets	1	–	17	13
Bowling average	119.00	–	48.29	27.46
5 wickets in innings	0	–	0	0
10 wickets in match	0	–	0	0
Best bowling	1/25	–	3/23	4/32
Catches/stumpings	7/–	0/–	186/–	118/–
- Source: ESPNcricinfo, 25 May 2011

David Lloyd Hemp (born 8 November 1970) is a Bermudian cricket coach and former cricketer. He is a left-handed batsman and a right-arm medium-pace bowler, who has played domestic cricket for Glamorgan, Free State, and Warwickshire. Hemp has also played List A and Twenty20 cricket. He is currently the batting coach of the Bangladesh cricket team.

He attended Millfield School. Hemp's younger brother, Tim, previously played for Glamorgan's second eleven, and appeared for Wales Minor Counties in the NatWest Trophy.

== County cricket ==
Hemp first appeared for Glamorgan in 1991, and was part of the Glamorgan side which won the 1993 Sunday League championship. He followed this up in 1994/95 when he went on a tour with the England A team to India and Bangladesh. The following season, he made a career high 157, before joining Warwickshire in 1997. He quickly made it into the top order, and played there consistently until he made a return to Glamorgan in 2002.

Having set a record for Glamorgan with a 251 second-wicket partnership, he also played in the match against Kent at Canterbury which won Glamorgan the Norwich Union League.

On 12 September 2006, he assumed the captaincy of Glamorgan with immediate effect after the resignation of Robert Croft. At the end of the 2008 season, he was released by the club.

== International cricket ==
In November 2006, Hemp made his debut for Bermuda, the country of his birth, in an ICC Intercontinental Cup game against Kenya. He went on to represent them in all games on their African tour, including seven One Day Internationals against Kenya, Canada and the Netherlands. The undoubted highlight of this tour was the Intercontinental Cup match against the Netherlands, in which Hemp scored an unbeaten 247, his highest first-class innings. At the time, this was the highest score in the history of the competition, but the record stood only until the Netherlands' next match, when Ryan ten Doeschate scored 259 not out.

His current top ODI score came during the qualifiers for the 2011 World Cup, as he hit 102 not out during Bermuda's loss to Kenya. His previous best, 76 not out against India at the 2007 World Cup, was the first-ever fifty scored by a Bermuda player in the World Cup. As Bermuda have not since returned to the tournament, it remains the highest score made by a Bermuda player in the World Cup, and he remains the country's highest aggregate run-scorer in the tournament.

== Coaching career ==
In 2014, he took on the role of assistant coach for the Prahran Cricket Club in Australia.

In October 2020, Hemp was appointed as head coach of the Pakistan women's national cricket team. In February 2024, he was appointed as the batting coach of the Bangladesh men's national cricket team. The Bangladesh Cricket Board (BCB) appointed him on a two-year contract, starting with the home series against Sri Lanka on 4 March at the Sylhet International Cricket Stadium.
