= Bermuda Cricket Board =

Sports governing body in Bermuda

- Sport: Cricket
- Jurisdiction: Bermuda
- Founded: 1966
- Regional affiliation: Americas
- Location: Bermuda

Official website
- www.cricketbermuda.com
- (Bermuda)

The Bermuda Cricket Board (BCB) is the official ICC-recognised organisation that represents Bermuda in terms of cricket issues. The board was set up in 1938, and became an associate member of the International Cricket Council in 1966. The Bermuda national cricket team qualified for the 2007 Cricket World Cup, the peak of Bermudian cricket.

The headquarters of BCB are at Point Finger Road, Paget, DV 04, Bermuda.

== History ==
The first recorded cricket match played in Bermuda was on August 30, 1844. Later, in 1845, the Bermuda Cricket Club. In 1948 the Somers Isles Cricket League merged with Bermuda Cricket Club to form Bermuda Cricket Board, which became the current BCB in 2003.

The BCB was stablished in 1938 and has been an associate member of the International Cricket Council (ICC) since 1966.

== Grounds ==
Please refer to this link for getting more information on cricket grounds in Bermuda.

== Domestic competitions ==
=== T20 league ===
- 2013: St. David's CCC
- 2014: Southampton Rangers Sports Club
- 2015: Southampton Rangers Sports Club
- 2016: Somerset Cricket Club
- 2017: St. David's CCC
- 2018: St. David's CCC
- 2019: Southampton Rangers Sports Club
- 2020: Southampton Rangers Sports Club
- 2021: St. George's Cricket Club

=== T20 franchise ===
- 2024: Bermuda Smash Invitational

== See also ==
- Bermuda national cricket team
- Bermuda women's national cricket team
- Bermuda national under-19 cricket team
