= Janeiro Tucker =

Bermudian cricketer (born 1975)

Janeiro Tucker OBE
Personal information
- Full name: Janeiro J Tucker
- Born: 15 March 1975 (age 51); Bermuda
- Batting: Right-handed
- Bowling: Right-arm medium
- Role: All-rounder

International information
- National side: Bermuda (2006–2019)
- ODI debut (cap 10): 17 May 2006 v Canada
- Last ODI: 8 April 2009 v Netherlands
- T20I debut (cap 28): 19 October 2019 v PNG
- Last T20I: 26 October 2019 v Netherlands

Career statistics
Competition	ODI	T20I	FC	LA
Matches	26	5	8	56
Runs scored	496	94	336	1080
Batting average	19.84	23.50	28.00	22.50
100s/50s	0/1	0/1	1/1	1/4
Top score	52	50*	123	132
Balls bowled	819	42	400	1912
Wickets	13	1	5	33
Bowling average	53.92	62.00	45.60	48.48
5 wickets in innings	0	0	0	0
10 wickets in match	0	0	0	0
Best bowling	2/23	1/16	3/29	3/29
Catches/stumpings	9/–	1/–	7/–	16/–
- Source: ESPNcricinfo, 21 December 2024

Janeiro J Tucker OBE (born 15 March 1975) is a Bermudian former cricketer, who played 26 One Day Internationals and five Twenty20 Internationals for his country.

== Career ==
Tucker's first top-level domestic cricket came in 1996-97, when he played for Bermuda against the Windward Islands in the List A Shell/Sandals Trophy, taking 1-45 and scoring three runs.

Tucker played a full part in Bermuda's 2005 ICC Trophy campaign in July of that year, as they claimed third place in the competition, averaging 46.40 with the bat including scoring 132 against the USA at The Lawn, Waringstown. The following month he made a century on his first-class debut, scoring 123 in the second innings against Canada in the ICC Intercontinental Cup.

He captained the Bermudian cricket team in their first ever One Day International when they played Canada on 17 May 2006; Tucker took 2/29 off nine overs and scored 17 as Bermuda won by three wickets.

Tucker was selected as part of Bermuda's squad for the 2012 ICC World Twenty20 Qualifier.

In April 2018, he was named in Bermuda's squad for the 2018 ICC World Cricket League Division Four tournament in Malaysia. In September 2019, he was named in Bermuda's squad for the 2019 ICC T20 World Cup Qualifier tournament in the United Arab Emirates. Tucker made his Twenty20 International debut against Papua New Guinea, on 19 October 2019.

== Personal life ==
In 2019, Tucker was awarded an OBE for services to sport. His father, John, also played cricket for Bermuda.
