= Bermuda national cricket team =

Bermuda
- Nickname: Gombey Warriors
- Association: Bermuda Cricket Board

Personnel
- Captain: Delray Rawlins
- Coach: Niraj Odedra

International Cricket Council
- ICC status: Associate member (1966)
- ICC region: Americas
ICC Rankings	Current	Best-ever
T20I	31st	28th (12 April 2025)

One Day Internationals
- First ODI: v Canada at the Queen's Park Oval, Port of Spain; 17 May 2006
- Last ODI: v Netherlands at Senwes Park, Potchefstroom; 8 April 2009
ODIs	Played	Won/Lost
Total	35	7/28 (0 ties, 0 no results)
- World Cup appearances: 1 (first in 2007)
- Best result: First round (2007)
- World Cup Qualifier appearances: 8 (first in 1979)
- Best result: Runner-up (1982)

T20 Internationals
- First T20I: v Scotland at Stormont, Belfast; 3 August 2008
- Last T20I: v Cayman Islands at Jimmy Powell Oval, George Town; 27 September 2026
T20Is	Played	Won/Lost
Total	61	39/20 (0 ties, 2 no results)
This year	8	6/1 (0 ties, 1 no result)
- T20 World Cup Qualifier appearances: 5 (Note: For the 2024 and 2026 Men's T20 World Cups, the final round of qualification in Americas was the ICC Americas Regional Final.) (first in 2008)
- Best result: Runners-up (2023)
T20I kit
- As of 27 September 2026

The Bermuda men's national cricket team represents the British overseas territory of Bermuda in international cricket. The team is organised by the Bermuda Cricket Board (BCB), which became an associate member of the International Cricket Council (ICC) in 1966.

A Bermudian national team was first organised in 1891, when a tour of New York City was arranged. In the years before World War I, Bermuda and American teams (including the Philadelphians) frequently exchanged tours, although it was not until 1912, when Australia toured, that the national team played a full international. After the 1920s, the focus of Bermudian cricket moved away from the United States towards the countries of the West Indies, although frequent tours from West Indian teams began only in the 1950s. The national team also played matches against international teams travelling to and from tours of the West Indies. However, only one of these games, against New Zealand in 1972, held first-class status.

The ICC Trophy (now the World Cup Qualifier) commenced in 1979 as the first World Cup qualifying tournament for ICC associate members. Bermuda made the semi-finals that year, and at the 1982 edition made the final, losing to Zimbabwe. However, the side did not qualify for the World Cup, as it featured only one associate qualifier. By the time of the 2005 ICC Trophy, the number of associate qualifiers had been increased to six. By making the semi-finals that year, Bermuda qualified for the 2007 World Cup, becoming the smallest country to do so (both in terms of population and area). The team also received One Day International (ODI) and Twenty20 International (T20I) status until 2009. However, Bermuda performed poorly both at the World Cup and in subsequent ODI series, and after the 2009 World Cup Qualifier was relegated to the 2011 World Cricket League Division Two tournament. The team has since dropped three more divisions.

In April 2018, the ICC decided to grant full Twenty20 International (T20I) status to all its members. Therefore, all Twenty20 matches played between Bermuda and other ICC members after 1 January 2019 have the full T20I status. Later in 2019, Bermuda played in the 2019–21 ICC Cricket World Cup Challenge League.

In 2023 they played the regional finals of Americas Qualifier for 2024 T20 World Cup, where they had equal points with Canada but on the basis of NRR (Net Run Rate) Canada qualified. Bermuda player Kamau Leverock was declared player of the tournament.

== History ==
=== Beginnings ===
The first recorded cricket match to take place in Bermuda occurred on 30 August 1844. The Bermuda Cricket Club was formed one year later and had support from locals as well as British troops. Some international games were played against American sides, principally from Philadelphia in the late 19th century, but the cricketing strength of the island diminished greatly after the First World War. Indeed, the only significant tour in the inter-War years was a five-match tour by a team led by Sir Julien Cahn in 1933.

=== Post Second World War ===
After the Second World War cricket regained popularity in Bermuda, and many tours arrived, including some Test sides on the way to the West Indies. The first Bermudian tour of England took place in 1960 and more tours followed. Bermuda also is the place where the first non-Yorkshireman played for Yorkshire County Cricket Club. Yorkshire traditionally had a rule that no-one born outside the county could play for them, a rule abandoned in the 1990s. However, the rule was bent to allow Garry Sobers to play some games for them under the captaincy of Brian Close during a festival match in Bermuda.

In 1966 Bermuda was elected to Associate Membership of the International Cricket Council. A match against New Zealand in April 1972 was given first-class status. Since then they have competed in a wide range of international competitions including the ICC Trophy, a competition which was proposed by Alma Hunt, the Bermudian delegate to the ICC.

=== 21st century ===
==== Rise, ODI status and the 2005 ICC Trophy (2004–2006) ====
In 2003 and 2004 they competed in the ICC Intercontinental Cup, playing in the same group as Canada and the United States. In 2004, the first running of the competition, they were knocked out after losing to Canada and drawing against the Americans. In 2005, they won the American group after beating Canada and the Cayman Islands in Canada. However, the semi-final against Kenya in October was lost.

Bermuda's greatest cricketing moment came on 7 July 2005 when they qualified for the semi-finals of the 2005 ICC Trophy. Qualification for the Semi-finals meant they won a place in the 2007 Cricket World Cup in the West Indies and that, from 1 January 2006 until the 2009 ICC World Cup Qualifier, they had official One Day International status.

==== Rapid decline and the 2007 Cricket World Cup (2006–2007) ====
Bermuda's first international engagement of 2006 ended in disappointment, when they lost every game on a five-match tour of the UAE. In April 2006 they hosted and took part in a Twenty20 tournament called the World Cricket Classic.

Bermuda played their first One-Day International in May 2006, and were successful in their first outing, beating Canada at the Queen's Park Oval in Trinidad as part of a triangular series which also included Zimbabwe. This made them the fourth team to win their first ODI, after Australia, New Zealand and Zimbabwe. However, Bermuda lost their second ODI, against Zimbabwe by 194 runs having conceded 338 for seven. They went on to lose the final, again against Zimbabwe.

In July 2006, they took part in the Stanford 20/20 knock-out tournament, but lost to Jamaica. They were given $100,000 for participating in the event. The following month they toured Canada, playing a four-day ICC Intercontinental Cup game and two ODIs. They lost the Intercontinental Cup game by nine wickets in a match that went into the final hour, but won both of the two ODIs. They are due to play Kenya and the Netherlands in their other Intercontinental Cup matches later that year. Also in August, they played in Division One of the ICC Americas Championship and went on to win the tournament for the first time, without losing a game. In November they visited Kenya for an Intercontinental Cup match and three ODIs. They drew the Intercontinental Cup match in a rain-affected game, and lost all three ODIs. They then went to South Africa, starting with an Intercontinental Cup game against the Netherlands. This was drawn, but highlighted by a record breaking innings from Glamorgan batsman David Hemp who scored 247 not out, the highest score in the history of the competition. This was followed by a triangular series against Canada and the Netherlands. They lost the first three games, but beat the Netherlands in the final, low-scoring game.

At the end of January 2007, Bermuda travelled to Kenya for the Division One tournament of the ICC World Cricket League. They lost 4 out of their 5 games: a 10 wicket loss to eventual champions Kenya, a 4 wicket loss to Ireland, losing by 56 runs to Canada (being bowled out inside just 16 overs) and losing by 8 wickets to the Netherlands; their only win coming against Scotland by 5 wickets. They finished bottom of the group, behind Ireland on net run rate (Bermuda with −1.310, Ireland with −0.061).

This was followed by a triangular series, played at the Antigua Recreation Ground in St. John's, Antigua, which saw Bermuda play Bangladesh and Canada. Their opening match was against Bangladesh where they posted 205/8 in their 50 overs, Lionel Cann top scoring with 33 off just 23 balls, however Bangladeshi opener Shahriar Nafees quickly silenced any thought of Bermuda pulling off a win, posting 104 not out and guiding Bangladesh home to an 8 wicket win.
After winning the toss and deciding to bat against Canada, Bermuda scored 206/8 from their 50 overs: an innings that was saved from collapse in large due to the partnerships between captain Irving Romaine and Saleem Mukuddem, for 57, as well as Lionel Cann and Delyone Borden, for 38. Cann top scored for Bermuda again, this time for 42 – notably off just 25 balls, including five sixes. Come the Canadian innings, opener Abdool Samad took to the crease in similar fashion to Nafees the day before. His 83 from 86 took Canada to 135/3, and well on the way to victory. Delyone Borden's spin bowling brought them back into the game – taking 4 wickets for just 33 runs, and reducing Canada to 179/6; but the tail end of Canada's batting order got them the 207 runs they required – with 6 overs to spare and losing just 1 more wicket – to finish on 207/7.

On 5 March Bermuda played England in St. Vincent. England were at 286–8 after the 50 overs thanks to a quick 76 by Jamie Dalrymple and with Ian Bell and Kevin Pietersen scoring 46 and 43 respectively. The Bermudian innings came to a close after just 22.2 overs with England claiming all 10 wickets with just 45 runs on the scorecard, with the highest runner getting 11. Jon Lewis claimed 3 wickets with James Anderson and Andrew Flintoff both getting 2.

Their second warm-up match was against Zimbabwe, also in St. Vincent. Bermuda won the toss and chose to bat, but soon started losing wickets. Janeiro Tucker scored 56, but was one of only 4 players to reach double figures before Bermuda were bowled out on the last ball of their innings for 136. Zimbabwe lost 2 wickets inside the first three overs, but Sean Williams top scored with 72 not out to reach their target of 137 in just 29 overs, losing just 4 wickets on the way.

After more than a year of unconvincing defeats, Bermuda's first appearance in the World Cup was unsurprisingly marked with 3 heavy defeats, having been drawn with Sri Lanka, India and Bangladesh. In their opening game they posted a meager 78 all out, chasing Sri Lanka's 321/6.

In their second game against India they struggled with the ball and India posted the highest total in World Cup history: 413/5. In response, David Hemp posted the maiden Bermudian half century in World Cup cricket with 76 not out. However, besides Hemp, the batsmen also struggled: the second highest scorer was Dean Minors with 21, and 5 of the 11 players were out for ducks.

Their final game, against Bangladesh, was hit heavily by rain: after originally being reduced to 41 overs a side it was ultimately decided that a maximum of 21 overs each could be played. Bermuda posted 94/9 in that time, with David Hemp top scoring again (with 23); but Bangladesh reached 96 in 17.3 overs, despite losing 3 quick wickets.

August saw them lose to Ireland and the Netherlands by huge margins in the 2007–08 ICC Intercontinental Cup, as well as an ODI series against the Netherlands. Between October and November they played the remainder of their Intercontinental Cup matches, against Kenya and the United Arab Emirates, as well as an ODI series against both nations. They finished last in the tournament.

==== Further decline and absolute collapse (2009–present) ====
The team then took part in 2009 ICC World Cup Qualifier where they finished 9th, and were relegated to 2011 ICC World Cricket League Division Two and qualified for 2009-10 ICC Intercontinental Shield. They lost heavily in the Intercontinental Shield.

Bermuda finished last in the 2011 ICC World Cricket League Division Two, thus relegating them to 2013 ICC World Cricket League Division Three. In April 2013 Bermuda hosted the 2013 ICC World Cricket League Division Three in which they came 4th. At the 2013 ICC World Twenty20 Qualifier Bermuda finished 14th with wins over Denmark and a surprise win over Scotland, with outstanding bowling from Jacobi Robinson. In the 2014 ICC World Cricket League Division Three, Bermuda capitulated against all teams, managing one win against Malaysia. They ended up coming last, thus relegating them to the 2016 ICC World Cricket League Division Four. In the space of less than six years, Bermuda went from being in the ICC World Cup Qualifier Division, to Division Four.

Bermuda progressed from 2018-19 Americas southern sub region qualifier to Regionals Finals in 2018.

== International grounds ==
Locations of all stadiums which have hosted an international cricket match within Bermuda

Ground	City	Parish	Capacity	Matches hosted	Notes
National Stadium	Hamilton	Pembroke Parish	8,500	ODIs, T20Is	Main stadium; hosted ICC events and World Cup qualifiers
St. David's Cricket Club Ground	St. David's Island	St. George's Parish	1,000	T20Is, domestic finals	Club ground used for ICC Americas and domestic cricket
White Hill Field	Sandys Parish	Sandys Parish	1,000	T20Is	Hosted matches in the 2019 ICC T20 World Cup Americas Qualifier

== Tournament history ==
Legend

- Champions
- Runners-up
- Third place/Semi-finals
- Hosts
- Q Qualified
- DNQ Did not qualify
- ▲ Promoted
- Remained in the same division
- ▼ Relegated

=== Cricket World Cup ===
Cricket World Cup record								Qualification record				
Year	Round	Position	Pld	W	L	T	NR	Pld	W	L	T	NR
(England) 1975	Not invited							No qualifiers held				
(England) 1979	Did not qualify							5	3	1	0	1
(England) (Wales) 1983	Did not qualify							9	7	1	0	1
(India) (Pakistan) 1987	Did not qualify							10	7	3	0	0
(Australia) (New Zealand) 1992	Did not qualify							6	4	2	0	0
(India) (Pakistan) (Sri Lanka) 1996	Did not qualify							9	6	3	0	0
(England) (Wales) (Scotland) (Republic of Ireland) (Netherlands) 1999	Did not qualify							6	3	2	0	1
(South Africa) (Zimbabwe) (Kenya) 2003	Did not qualify							6	3	3	0	0
(Cricket West Indies) 2007	Group stage	16/16	3	0	3	0	0	12	6	5	0	1
(India) (Sri Lanka) (Bangladesh) 2011	Did not qualify							7	3	4	0	0
(Australia) (New Zealand) 2015	Did not qualify							12	4	8	0	0
(England) (Wales) 2019	Did not qualify							12	3	9	0	0
(India) 2023	Did not qualify							15	0	14	0	1
(South Africa) (Namibia) (Zimbabwe) 2027	Did not qualify							Did not qualify				
Total	0 Titles	1/14	3	0	3	0	0	103	49	55	0	5

=== Cricket World Cup Qualifier ===
Cricket World Cup Qualifier record
Year	Round	Position	Pld	W	L	T	NR	Qual.
(Sri Lanka) 1979	Semi-finals	4/15	5	3	1	0	1	DNQ
(England) 1982	Runners-up	2/16	9	7	1	0	1	DNQ
(England) 1986	Semi-finals	4/12	10	7	3	0	0	DNQ
(Netherlands) 1990	First round	13/17	6	4	2	0	0	DNQ
(Kenya) 1994	Semi-finals	4/20	9	6	3	0	0	DNQ
(Malaysia) 1997	Plate round	9/22	5	3	2	0	1	DNQ
(Canada) 2001	Super League Play-offs	9/24	6	3	3	0	0	DNQ
(Republic of Ireland) 2005	Semi-finals	4/12	7	3	3	0	1	DNQ
(South Africa) 2009	Round-robin	9/12	7	3	4	0	0	DNQ
(New Zealand) 2014	Did not qualify							
(Zimbabwe) 2018	Did not qualify							
(Zimbabwe) 2023	Did not qualify							
2027	Did not qualify							
Total	9/13	0 Titles	64	39	22	0	4	—N/a

=== Cricket World Cup Challenge League ===
Cricket World Cup Challenge League record
Year	League	Position	Pld	W	L	T	NR	P/R
2019–22	B	12/12	15	0	14	0	1	▼
2024–26	Did not qualify							
Total	0 Titles	1/2	15	0	14	0	1	—N/a

=== Men's T20 World Cup ===
Men's T20 World Cup record								Qualification record				
Year	Round	Position	Pld	W	L	T	NR	Pld	W	L	T	NR
(South Africa) 2007	Did not qualify							5	1	4	0	0
(England) 2009	Did not qualify							3	0	3	0	0
(Cricket West Indies) 2010	Not eligible; no ODI status							Not eligible; no ODI status				
(Sri Lanka) 2012	Did not qualify							14	5	9	0	0
(Bangladesh) 2014	Did not qualify							16	7	9	0	0
(India) 2016	Did not qualify							6	1	5	0	0
(United Arab Emirates) (Oman) 2021	Did not qualify							12	4	7	0	1
(Australia) 2022	Did not qualify							6	4	2	0	0
(United States) (Cricket West Indies) 2024	Did not qualify							10	8	1	0	1
(India) (Sri Lanka) 2026	Did not qualify							14	10	3	0	1
(Australia) (New Zealand) 2028	To be determined							4*	3	0	0	1
Total	—N/a	0/10	–	–	–	–	–	90	43	43	0	4

=== T20 World Cup Global Qualifier ===
Men's T20 World Cup Global Qualifier record
Year	Round	Position	Pld	W	L	T	NR	Qual.
(Ireland) 2008	Group stage	6/6	3	0	3	0	0	DNQ
(United Arab Emirates) 2010	Did not qualify							
(United Arab Emirates) 2012	Play-offs	13/16	9	2	7	0	0	DNQ
(United Arab Emirates) 2013	Play-offs	14/16	8	2	6	0	0	DNQ
(Ireland) (Scotland) 2015	Did not qualify							
(United Arab Emirates) 2019	Group stage	13/14	6	0	6	0	0	DNQ
(Oman) / (Zimbabwe) 2022	Did not qualify							
(To be determined) 2028	To be determined							
Total	0 Titles	4/8	26	4	22	0	0	—N/a

=== T20 World Cup Americas Regional Final ===
T20 World Cup Americas Regional Final records
Year	Round	Position	Pld	W	L	T	NR	Qual.
(Bermuda) 2018	Runners-up	2/4	6	4	1	0	1	Q
(Antigua and Barbuda) 2021	Round-robin	3/7	6	4	2	0	0	DNQ
(Bermuda) 2023	Round-robin	2/4	6	4	1	0	1	DNQ
(Canada) 2025	Round-robin	2/4	6	3	3	0	0	DNQ
Total	4/4	0 Titles	24	15	7	0	2	—N/a

=== North American Cup ===
Year	Round	Position	Pld	W	L	T	NR	Ref
(Cayman Islands) 2025	Semi-finals	3/5	5	2	3	0	0	
(Cayman Islands) 2026	Champions	1/3	6	3	1	0	2	
Total	1 Title	2/2	11	5	4	0	2	—N/a

=== Other international tournaments ===
CWC Challenge League Play-off (List A)	ICC Intercontinental Cup (FC)	World Cricket League (LA/ODI/50 overs)
2024: 6th place	2004: Group stage; 2005: Semi-finals; 2006–07: Group stage; 2007–08: Round-robin; 2009–10: Round-robin	2007 (Division One) : 6th place (▼); 2011 (Division Two) : 6th place (▼); 2013 (Division Three) : 4th place; 2014 (Division Three) : 6th place (▼); 2016 (Division Four) : 4th place; 2018 (Division Four) : 6th place (▼)

=== Other regional tournaments ===
T20WC Americas Sub-regional Qualifiers (T20I)	ICC Americas Championship (List A)	ICC Americas Twenty20 Division One (T20)
2018 : Winners (Q); 2023 : Winners (Q); 2024 : Winners (Q); 2026 : Winners (Q)	2000: Runners-up; 2002: 4th place; 2004: 3rd place; 2006: Winners; 2008: Runners-up; 2009-10: 3rd place; 2011: 3rd place	2011: 3rd place; 2013: 2nd place; 2015: 3rd place

== Current squad ==
Updated as on 15 June 2025

This lists all the active players who played for Bermuda in the recently concluded 2025 Men's T20 World Cup Americas Regional Final.

Name	Age	Batting style	Bowling style	Last T20I	Note(s)
Batters
Onias Bascome	31	Right-handed	Right-arm medium	(Canada) 2025	
Alex Dore	29	Left-handed	—N/a	(Canada) 2025	
Tre Manders	31	Right-handed	—N/a	(Canada) 2025	
All-rounders
Zeko Burgess	44	Right-handed	Right-arm medium	(Canada) 2025	
Derrick Brangman	39	Left-handed	Slow left-arm orthodox	(Canada) 2025	
Delray Rawlins	29	Left-handed	Slow left-arm orthodox	(Canada) 2025	
Dominic Sabir	23	Right-handed	Right-arm medium	(Canada) 2025	
Jonté Smith	32	Right-handed	Right-arm medium	(Canada) 2025	
Wicket-keeper
Terryn Fray	35	Right-handed	—N/a	(Canada) 2025	Captain
Sinclair Smith	35	Right-handed	—N/a	(Cayman Islands) 2025	Vice-captain
Jarryd Richardson	23	Right-handed	—N/a	(Canada) 2025	
Marcus Scotland	23	Right-handed	—N/a	(The Bahamas) 2025	
Pace bowlers
Kevon Fubler	34	Left-handed	Left-arm medium-fast	(The Bahamas) 2025	
Jermal Proctor	21	Right-handed	Right-arm medium	(Canada) 2025	
Chare Smith	28	Right-handed	Right-arm fast-medium	(Canada) 2025	

== Records and statistics ==
International Match Summary – Bermuda

Last updated 27 September 2026.

Playing Record
Format	M	W	L	T	D/NR	Inaugural Match
One Day Internationals	35	7	28	0	0	17 May 2006
Twenty20 Internationals	61	39	20	0	2	3 August 2008

=== One Day Internationals ===
- Highest team total: 275/8 v Ireland, 31 January 2007 at Jaffery Sports Club Ground, Nairobi
- Highest individual score: 102*, David Hemp v Kenya, 6 April 2009 at Senwes Park, Potchefstroom
- Best individual bowling figures: 5/53, Dwayne Leverock v Kenya, 14 November 2006 at Mombasa Sports Club, Mombasa

Most ODI runs for Bermuda

Player	Runs	Average	Career span
Irving Romaine	783	25.25	2006–2009
David Hemp	641	33.73	2006–2009
Lionel Cann	590	26.81	2006–2009
Janeiro Tucker	496	19.84	2006–2009
Dean Minors	478	26.55	2006–2007

Most ODI wickets for Bermuda

Player	Wickets	Average	Career span
Dwayne Leverock	34	33.02	2006–2009
Saleem Mukuddem	23	32.69	2006–2007
Kevin Hurdle	23	36.13	2006–2007
Rodney Trott	16	25.75	2007–2009
Delyone Borden	15	26.13	2006–2008

Highest individual innings in ODI

Player	Score	Opposition	Venue	Year
David Hemp	102*	Kenya	Potchefstroom	2009
Irving Romaine	101	Canada	Toronto	2006
Irving Romaine	85*	Scotland	Nairobi	2007
David Hemp	81	Netherlands	Potchefstroom	2009
David Hemp	76*	India	Port of Spain	2007

Best bowling figures in an innings in ODI

Player	Score	Opposition	Venue	Year
Dwayne Leverock	5/53	Kenya	Mombasa	2006
Delyone Borden	4/30	Canada	St John's	2007
Saleem Mukuddem	4/40	Netherlands	Benoni	2006
Hasan Durham	4/45	Canada	Toronto	2006
Rodney Trott	4/46	Kenya	Nairobi	2007

ODI record versus other nations

Opponent	M	W	L	T	NR	First Match	First win
vs Test nations
Bangladesh	2	0	2	0	0	25 February 2007	
India	1	0	1	0	0	19 March 2007	
Ireland	1	0	1	0	0	31 January 2007	
Sri Lanka	1	0	1	0	0	15 March 2007	
West Indies	1	0	1	0	0	20 August 2008	
Zimbabwe	2	0	2	0	0	18 May 2006	
vs Associate Members
Canada	11	5	6	0	0	17 May 2006	17 May 2006
Kenya	8	0	8	0	0	11 November 2006	
Netherlands	7	1	6	0	0	28 November 2006	2 December 2006
Scotland	1	1	0	0	0	5 February 2007	5 February 2007

=== Twenty20 Internationals ===
- Highest team total: 239/6 v. Bahamas on 10 November 2021 at Coolidge Cricket Ground, Antigua.
- Highest individual score: 121, Delray Rawlins v. Brazil on 27 June 2026 at White Hill Field, Sandys Parish.
- Best individual bowling figures: 5/18, Allan Douglas v. Cayman Islands, 25 August 2019 at White Hill Field, Sandys Parish.

Most T20I runs for Bermuda

Player	Runs	Average	Career span
Delray Rawlins	1,491	41.41	2019–2026
Kamau Leverock	917	33.96	2019–2026
Tre Manders	852	34.08	2021–2026
Onias Bascome	628	19.62	2019–2026
Terryn Fray	573	16.37	2019–2026

Most T20I wickets for Bermuda

Player	Wickets	Average	Career span
Derrick Brangman	60	12.46	2019–2026
Delray Rawlins	46	18.67	2019–2026
Dominic Sabir	39	11.89	2021–2026
Kamau Leverock	29	20.82	2019–2026
Zeko Burgess	26	22.34	2021–2026

T20I record versus other nations

Records complete to T20I #4151. Last updated 27 September 2026.

Opponent	M	W	L	T	NR	First Match	First win
vs ICC Full Members
Ireland	1	0	1	0	0	3 August 2008	
vs Associate Members
Argentina	5	5	0	0	0	14 November 2021	14 November 2021
Bahamas	9	8	0	0	1	10 November 2021	10 November 2021
Belize	3	3	0	0	0	13 November 2021	13 November 2021
Brazil	2	2	0	0	0	11 December 2024	11 December 2024
Canada	9	1	7	0	1	5 August 2008	30 September 2023
Cayman Islands	12	10	2	0	0	21 August 2019	21 August 2019
Kenya	1	0	1	0	0	21 October 2019	
Mexico	1	1	0	0	0	10 December 2024	10 December 2024
Namibia	1	0	1	0	0	23 October 2019	
Netherlands	1	0	1	0	0	26 October 2019	
Panama	6	6	0	0	0	11 November 2021	11 November 2021
Papua New Guinea	1	0	1	0	0	19 October 2019	
Scotland	2	0	2	0	0	3 August 2008	
Singapore	1	0	1	0	0	20 October 2019	
Suriname	1	1	0	0	0	7 December 2024	7 December 2024
United States	5	2	3	0	0	18 August 2019	18 August 2019

== Coaching staff ==
Niraj Odedra was appointed head coach of Bermuda in June 2022, replacing interim coach Cal Waldron.

- Chairman of High Performance Committee: Gershon Gibbons
- Head coach: (India) Niraj Odedra
- Asst. coach: (Bermuda) Lorenzo Tucker
- Bowling coach: (Bermuda) Lorenzo Tucker
- Fielding coach: (Bermuda) Reginald Tucker
- Mental conditioning coach: Vacant
- Fitness trainer: (Bermuda) Nick Jones
- Head Physiotherapist: Danielle Richold
- Masseur: n/a
- Performance analyst: (Bermuda) Lorenzo Tucker

== See also ==
- Bermuda women's national cricket team
- Bermuda at the Cricket World Cup
- List of Bermuda ODI cricketers
- List of Bermuda Twenty20 International cricketers
- Bermudian national cricket captains
