= List of India One Day International cricket records =

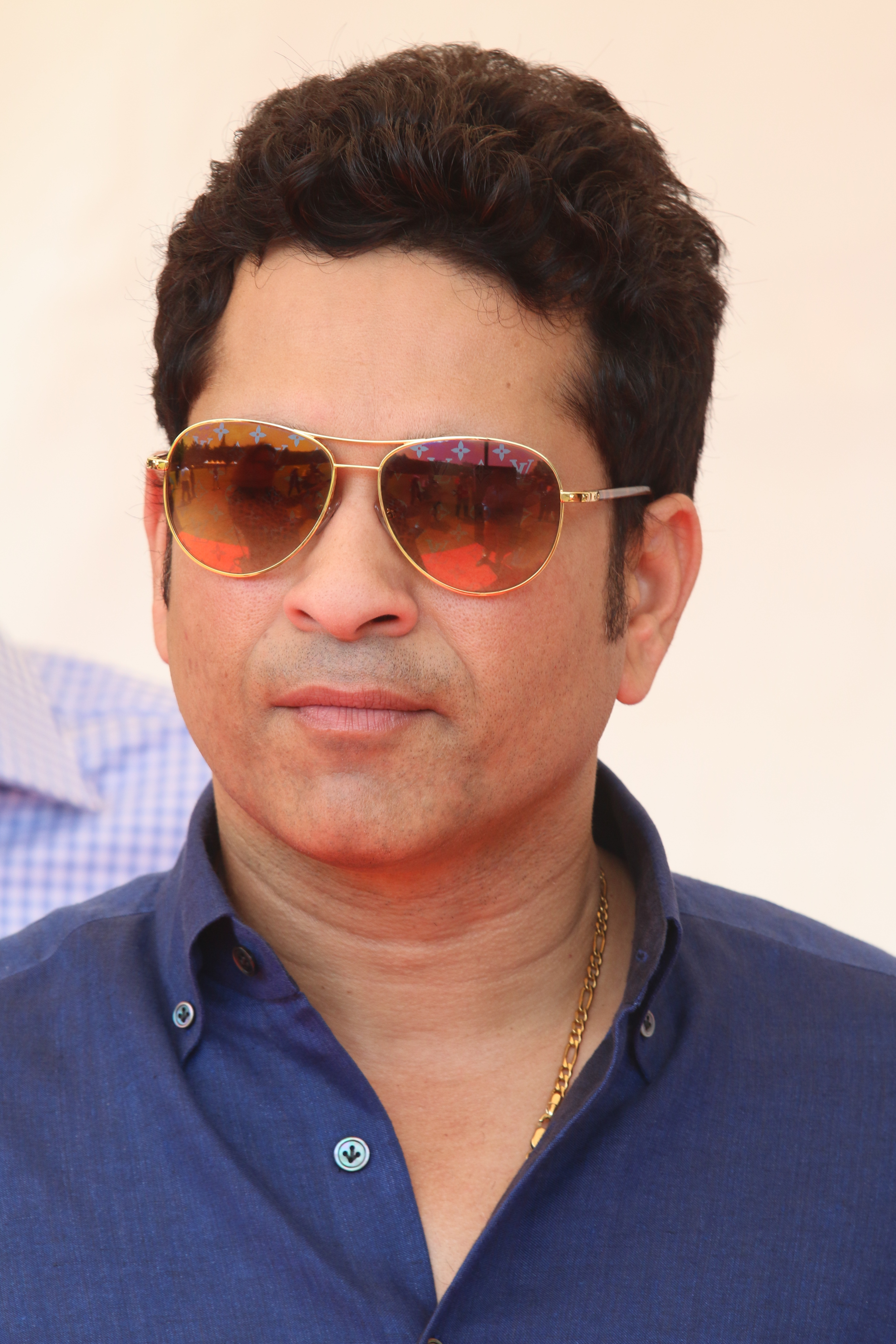
Sachin Tendulkar, widely acknowledged as one of the greatest batsmen of all time, still holds several records.

One Day International (ODI) cricket is played between international cricket teams who are Full Members of the International Cricket Council (ICC) as well as the top eight Associate members. Unlike Test matches, ODIs consist of one inning per team, having a limit in the number of overs, currently 50 overs per innings – although in the past this has been 55 or 60 overs. ODI cricket is List-A cricket, so statistics and records set in ODI matches also count in List-A cricket records. The earliest match recognised as an ODI was played between England and Australia in January 1971; since then there have been over 4,000 ODIs played by 28 teams. This is a list of Indian Cricket team's One Day International records. It is based on the List of One Day International cricket records, but concentrates solely on records dealing with the Indian cricket team. India played its first ever ODI in 1974.

== Key ==
Key
Symbol	Meaning
†	Player or umpire is currently active in ODI cricket
‡	Event took place during a Cricket World Cup
*	Player remained not out or partnership remained unbroken
♠	One Day International cricket record
Date	Starting date of the match
Innings	Number of innings played
Matches	Number of matches played
Opposition	The team India was playing against
Period	The time period when the player was active in ODI cricket
Player	The player involved in the record
Venue	One Day International cricket ground where the match was played
YTL	Not lost a single match against an multiple opponent
YTP	Not played series of matches there until date

== Team records ==
=== Overall record ===
Matches	Won	Lost	Tied	NR	W/L ratio	Win %
1089	580	454	10	45	1.274	56.03
Last updated: 15 November 2026

Note: Tied matches considered as half win.

W/L ratio and win % excluded the matches which ended in No result.

=== Head-to-head records ===
Won more matches than lost
All matches tied/no result
Won equal matches to lost
Lost more matches than won

Opponent	Matches	Won	Lost	Tied	No Result	% Won	First	Last
ICC Full Members
Afghanistan	7	6	0	1	0	92.85	2014	2026
Australia	155	59	86	0	10	40.68	1980	2025
Bangladesh	42	33	8	0	1	78.57	1988	2025
England	113	62	46	2	3	54.87	1974	2026
Ireland	3	3	0	0	0	100.00	2007	2015
New Zealand	128	66	53	1	8	55.41	1975	2026
Pakistan	136	58	73	0	5	42.64	1978	2025
South Africa	97	42	52	0	3	44.68	1991	2025
Sri Lanka	171	99	59	2	11	57.89	1979	2024
West Indies	145	74	65	2	4	51.03	1979	2026
Zimbabwe	66	54	10	2	0	81.81	1983	2022
ICC Associate Members
Bermuda	1	1	0	0	0	100.00	2007	2007
East Africa	1	1	0	0	0	100.00	1975	1975
Hong Kong	2	2	0	0	0	100.00	2008	2018
Kenya	13	11	2	0	0	84.62	1996	2004
Namibia	1	1	0	0	0	100.00	2003	2003
Nepal	1	1	0	0	0	100.00	2023	2023
Netherlands	3	3	0	0	0	100.00	2003	2023
Scotland	1	1	0	0	0	100.00	2007	2007
United Arab Emirates	3	3	0	0	0	100.00	1994	2015
Total	1089	580	454	10	45	56.03	1974	2026
Statistics are correct as of India v New Zealand at Bay Oval, Tauranga, 15 November 2026

=== First bilateral ODI series wins ===
Opponent	Year of first home win	Year of first away win
Australia	1986	2019
Bangladesh	YTP	2004
England	1981	1990
Ireland	YTP	2007
New Zealand	1988	2009
Pakistan	1983	2004
Scotland	YTP	2007
South Africa	1991	2018
Sri Lanka	1982	2008
West Indies	1994	2002
Zimbabwe	1993	1992
Last updated: 1 July 2020

=== First ODI match wins ===
Opponent	Home		Away / neutral	
Opponent	Venue	Year	Venue	Year
Afghanistan	New Delhi	2023 ‡	Dhaka	2014
Australia	Jaipur	1986	Melbourne	1980
Bangladesh	Chandigarh	1990	Chittagong	1988
Bermuda	YTP		Port of Spain	2007 ‡
East Africa	YTP		Leeds	1975 ‡
England	Jallandhar	1981	Manchester	1983
Hong Kong	YTP		Karachi	2008
Ireland	Bangalore	2011 ‡	Belfast	2007
Kenya	Cuttack	1996 ‡	Bristol	1999 ‡
Namibia	YTP		Pietermaritzburg	2003 ‡
Nepal	YTP		Pallekele	2023
Netherlands	Delhi	2011 ‡	Paarl	2003 ‡
New Zealand	Bangalore	1987 ‡	WACA	1980
Pakistan	Hyderabad	1983	Quetta	1978
Scotland	YTP		Glasgow	2007
South Africa	Kolkata	1991	Centurion	1992
Sri Lanka	Amritsar	1982	Sharjah	1984
United Arab Emirates	YTP		Sharjah	1984
West Indies	Kolkata	1988	Albion	1983
Zimbabwe	Mumbai	1987 ‡	Leicester	1983 ‡
Last updated: 12 October 2023

=== Winning every match in a series ===
In a bilateral series winning all matches is referred to as whitewash. The first such event occurred when West Indies toured England in 1976. India have recorded 17 such series victories.

Opposition	Matches	Host	Season
Sri Lanka	3	India	1982/83
New Zealand	4	India	1988/89
Zimbabwe	3	India	1992/93
England	5	India	2008/09
New Zealand	5	India	2010/11
England	5	India	2011/12
Zimbabwe	5	Zimbabwe	2013
Sri Lanka	5	India	2014/15
Zimbabwe	3	Zimbabwe	2015
Zimbabwe	3	Zimbabwe	2016
Sri Lanka	5	Sri Lanka	2017
West Indies	3	India	2022
West Indies	3	West Indies	2022
Zimbabwe	3	Zimbabwe	2022
Sri Lanka	3	India	2023
New Zealand	3	India	2023
England	3	India	2024/25
Last updated: 12 February 2025

=== Losing every match in a series ===
India have also suffered such whitewash five times.

Opposition	Matches	Host	Season
West Indies	5	India	1983/84
West Indies	5	West Indies	1988/89
South Africa	4	South Africa	2006/07
New Zealand	3	New Zealand	2019/20
South Africa	3	South Africa	2021/22
Last updated: 23 January 2022

=== Team scoring records ===
==== Most runs in an innings ====
Rank	Score	Opposition	Venue	Date	Scorecard
1	418/5	West Indies	Holkar Cricket Stadium, Indore, India	8 December 2011	Scorecard
2	414/8	Sri Lanka	Madhavrao Scindia Cricket Ground, Rajkot, India	15 December 2009	Scorecard
3	413/5	Bermuda	Queen's Park Oval, Port of Spain, Trinidad & Tobago	19 March 2007 ‡	Scorecard
4	410/4	Netherlands	M. Chinnaswamy Stadium, Bengaluru, India	12 November 2023 ‡	Scorecard
5	409/8	Bangladesh	Zohur Ahmed Chowdhury Stadium, Chittagong, Bangladesh	10 December 2022	Scorecard
Last updated: 12 November 2023

==== Fewest runs in an innings ====
Rank	Score	Opposition	Venue	Date	Scorecard
1	54	Sri Lanka	Sharjah Cricket Stadium, Sharjah, United Arab Emirates	29 October 2000	Scorecard
2	63	Australia	Sydney Cricket Ground, Sydney, Australia	8 January 1981	Scorecard
3	78	Sri Lanka	Green Park Stadium, Kanpur, India	24 December 1986	Scorecard
4	79	Pakistan	Jinnah Stadium, Sialkot, Pakistan	13 October 1978	Scorecard
5	88	New Zealand	Rangiri Dambulla International Stadium, Dambulla, Sri Lanka	10 August 2010	Scorecard
Last updated: 17 September 2023

==== Most runs conceded in an innings ====
Rank	Score	Opposition	Venue	Date	Scorecard
1	438/4	South Africa	Wankhede Stadium, Mumbai, India	25 October 2015	Scorecard
2	411/8	Sri Lanka	Madhavrao Scindia Cricket Ground, Rajkot, India	15 December 2009	Scorecard
3	405/7	West Indies	Assam Cricket Association Stadium, Guwahati, India	30 September 2026	Scorecard
4	389/4	Australia	Sydney Cricket Ground, Sydney, Australia	29 November 2020	Scorecard
5	387/3	England	Lord's, London, England	19 July 2026	Scorecard
Last updated: 30 September 2026

==== Fewest runs conceded in an innings ====
Rank	Score	Opposition	Venue	Date	Scorecard
1	50	Sri Lanka	R.Premadasa Stadium, Colombo, Sri Lanka	17 September 2023	Scorecard
2	55	Sri Lanka	Wankhede Stadium, Mumbai, India	2 November 2023 ‡	Scorecard
3	58	Bangladesh	Shere-e-Bangla Stadium, Mirpur, Bangladesh	17 June 2014	Scorecard
4	65	Zimbabwe	Harare Sports Club, Harare, Zimbabwe	29 August 2005	Scorecard
5	73	Sri Lanka	Greenfield International Stadium, Thiruvananthapuram, India	15 January 2023	Scorecard
Last updated: 2 November 2023

==== Most runs aggregate in a match ====
Rank	Aggregate	Scores	Venue	Date	Scorecard
1	825/15	India (414/7) v Sri Lanka (411/8)	Madhavrao Scindia Cricket Ground, Rajkot, India	15 December 2009	Scorecard
2	811/9	West Indies (405/7) v India (406/2)	Assam Cricket Association Stadium, Guwahati, India	30 September 2026	Scorecard
3	747/14	India (381/6) v England (366/8)	Barabati Stadium, Cuttack, India	19 January 2017	Scorecard
4	747/10	England (387/3) v India (360/7)	Lord's, London, England	19 July 2026	Scorecard
5	727/13	Australia (389/4) v India (338/9)	Sydney Cricket Ground, Sydney, Australia	29 November 2020	Scorecard
Last updated: 30 September 2026

==== Fewest runs aggregate in a match ====
Rank	Aggregate	Scores	Venue	Date	Scorecard
1	101/10	Sri Lanka (50) v India (51/0)	R. Premadasa Stadium, Colombo, Sri Lanka	17 September 2023	Scorecard
2	127/11	India (63) v Australia (64/1)	Sydney Cricket Ground, Sydney, Australia	8 January 1981	Scorecard
3	162/12	India (79) v Pakistan (83/2)	Jinnah Stadium, Sialkot, Pakistan	13 October 1978	Scorecard
4	163/20	India (105) v Bangladesh (58)	Shere-e-Bangla Stadium, Mirpur, Bangladesh	17 June 2014	Scorecard
5	167/18	Pakistan (87/9) v India (80/9)	Jinnah Stadium, Gujranwala, Pakistan	18 December 1988	Scorecard
Last updated: 17 September 2023

=== Result records ===
An ODI match is won when one side has scored more runs than the total runs scored by the opposing side during their innings. If both sides have completed both their allocated innings and the side that fielded last has the higher aggregate of runs, it is known as a win by runs. This indicates the number of runs that they had scored more than the opposing side. If the side batting last wins the match, it is known as a win by wickets, indicating the number of wickets that were still to fall.

==== Greatest win margins (by runs) ====
Rank	Margin	Target	Opposition	Venue	Date
1	317 runs	391	Sri Lanka	Greenfield International Stadium, Thiruvananthapuram, India	15 January 2023
2	302 runs	358	Sri Lanka	Wankhede Stadium, Mumbai, India	2 November 2023 ‡
3	257 runs	417	Bermuda	Queen's Park Oval, Port of Spain, Trinidad & Tobago	19 March 2007 ‡
4	256 runs	375	Hong Kong	National Stadium, Karachi, Pakistan	25 June 2008
5	243 runs	327	South Africa	Eden Gardens, Kolkata, India	5 November 2023
Last updated: 5 November 2023

==== Greatest win margins (by balls remaining) ====
Rank	Balls remaining	Margin	Opposition	Venue	Date
1	263	10 wickets	Sri Lanka	R.Premadasa Stadium, Colombo, Sri Lanka	17 September 2023
2	231	10 wickets	Kenya	Goodyear Park, Bloemfontein, South Africa	12 October 2001
3	211	9 wickets	West Indies	Greenfield International Stadium, Thiruvananthapuram, India	1 November 2018
4	200	8 wickets	South Africa	Wanderers Stadium, Johannesburg, South Africa	17 December 2023
5	188	10 wickets	England	The Oval, London, England	12 July 2022
Last updated: 17 December 2023

==== Greatest win margins (by 10 wickets) ====
India have won an ODI match by a margin of 10 wickets on 10 occasions.

Rank	Victories	Opposition	Most recent venue	Date
1	3	Zimbabwe	Harare Sports Club, Harare, Zimbabwe	18 August 2022
2	2	Sri Lanka	R.Premadasa Stadium, Colombo, Sri Lanka	17 September 2023
3	1	East Africa	Headingley, Leeds, England	11 June 1975 ‡
3	1	West Indies	Queen's Park Oval, Port of Spain, Trinidad & Tobago	27 April 1997
3	1	Kenya	Goodyear Park, Bloemfontein, South Africa	12 October 2001
3	1	England	The Oval, London, England	12 July 2022
3	1	Nepal	Pallekele International Cricket Stadium, Kandy, Sri Lanka	4 September 2023
Last updated: 4 September 2023

==== Highest successful run chases ====
Rank	Score	Target	Opposition	Venue	Date
1	406/2	406	West Indies	Assam Cricket Association Stadium, Guwahati, India	30 September 2026
2	362/1	360	Australia	Sawai Mansingh Stadium, Jaipur, India	16 October 2013
3	356/7	351	England	Maharashtra Cricket Association Stadium, Pune, India	15 January 2017
4	351/4	351	Australia	Vidarbha Cricket Association Stadium, Nagpur, India	30 October 2013
5	331/4	331	Australia	Sydney Cricket Ground, Sydney, Australia	23 January 2016
Last updated: 1 October 2026

==== Narrowest win margins (by runs) ====
India has achieved victory by 1 run four times.

Rank	Margin	Opposition	Venue	Date
1	1 run	New Zealand	Basin Reserve, Wellington, New Zealand	6 March 1990
1	1 run	Sri Lanka	Ranasinghe Premadasa Stadium, Colombo, Sri Lanka	25 July 1993
1	1 run	South Africa	Sawai Mansingh Stadium, Jaipur, India	21 February 2010
1	1 run	South Africa	New Wanderers Stadium, Johannesburg, South Africa	15 January 2011
5	2 runs	South Africa	Eden Gardens, Kolkata, India	24 November 1993
Last updated: 1 July 2020

==== Narrowest win margins (by balls remaining) ====
Rank	Balls remaining	Margin	Opposition	Venue	Date
1	0	3 wickets	Bangladesh	Dubai International Cricket Stadium, Dubai, United Arab Emirates	28 September 2018
2	1	3 wickets	Pakistan	Bangabandhu National Stadium, Dhaka, Bangladesh	18 January 1998
2	1	2 wickets	New Zealand	McLean Park, Napier, New Zealand	12 January 1999
2	1	4 wickets	South Africa	Moti Bagh Stadium, Vadodara, India	17 March 2000
2	1	1 wicket	New Zealand	Eden Park, Auckland, New Zealand	11 January 2003
2	1	5 wickets	West Indies	Sabina Park, Kingston, Jamaica	18 May 2006
2	1	6 wickets	West Indies	Darren Sammy National Cricket Stadium, Gros Islet, Saint Lucia	3 July 2009
2	1	3 wickets	Pakistan	Rangiri Dambulla International Stadium, Dambulla, Sri Lanka	19 June 2010
Last updated: 1 July 2020

==== Narrowest win margins (by wickets) ====
Rank	Margin	Opposition	Venue	Date
1	1 wicket	New Zealand	Eden Park, Auckland, New Zealand	11 January 2003
1	1 wicket	West Indies	Barabati Stadium, Cuttack, India	29 November 2011
1	1 wicket	Sri Lanka	Queen's Park Oval, Port of Spain, Trinidad & Tobago	11 July 2013
4	2 wickets	Sri Lanka	Sinhalese Sports Club Ground, Colombo, Sri Lanka	25 August 1985
4	2 wickets	New Zealand	Moti Bagh Stadium, Vadodara, India	17 December 1988
4	2 wickets	Australia	M. Chinnaswamy Stadium, Bangalore, India	21 October 1996
4	2 wickets	New Zealand	McLean Park, Napier, New Zealand	12 January 1999
4	2 wickets	England	Lord's, London, England	12 July 2002
4	2 wickets	New Zealand	Westpac Stadium, Wellington, New Zealand	8 January 2003
4	2 wickets	England	The Oval, London, England	5 September 2007
4	2 wickets	Australia	Brabourne Stadium, Mumbai, India	17 October 2007
4	2 wickets	Sri Lanka	Adelaide Oval, Adelaide, Australia	19 February 2008
4	2 wickets	South Africa	Sahara Park Newlands, Cape Town, South Africa	18 January 2011
4	2 wickets	West Indies	Queen's Park Oval, Port of Spain, Trinidad & Tobago	24 July 2022
Last updated: 24 July 2022

==== Greatest loss margins (by runs) ====
Rank	Margin	Opposition	Venue	Date
1	245 runs	Sri Lanka	Sharjah Cricket Stadium, Sharjah, UAE	29 October 2000
2	244 runs	New Zealand	Bay Oval, Mount Maunganui, New Zealand	13 November 2026
3	214 runs	South Africa	Wankhede Stadium, Mumbai, India	25 October 2015
4	208 runs	Australia	Sydney Cricket Ground, Sydney, Australia	8 February 2004
5	202 runs	England	Lord's, London, England	7 June 1975 ‡
Last updated: 13 November 2026

==== Greatest loss margins (by balls remaining) ====
Rank	Balls remaining	Margin	Opposition	Venue	Date
1	234	10 wickets	Australia	Dr. Y.S. Rajasekhara Reddy ACA-VDCA Cricket Stadium, Visakhapatnam, India	19 March 2023
2	212	8 wickets	New Zealand	Seddon Park, Hamilton, New Zealand	31 January 2019
3	209	8 wickets	Sri Lanka	Rangiri Dambulla International Stadium, Dambulla, Sri Lanka	22 August 2010
4	181	9 wickets	Sri Lanka	Mahinda Rajapaksa International Stadium, Hambantota, Sri Lanka	24 July 2012
5	176	7 wickets	Sri Lanka	Himachal Pradesh Cricket Association Stadium, Dharamshala, India	10 December 2017
Last updated: 19 March 2023

==== Greatest loss margins (by wickets) ====
India have lost an ODI match by a margin of 10 wickets on 6 occasions.

Rank	Margin	Opposition	Venue	Date
1	10	New Zealand	Melbourne Cricket Ground, Melbourne, Australia	10 January 1981
1	10	West Indies	Kensington Oval, Bridgetown, West Indies	3 May 1997
1	10	South Africa	Sharjah Cricket Stadium, Sharjah, United Arab Emirates	22 March 2000
1	10	South Africa	Eden Gardens, Kolkata, India	25 November 2005
1	10	Australia	Wankhede Stadium, Mumbai, India	14 January 2020
1	10	Australia	Dr. Y.S. Rajasekhara Reddy ACA-VDCA Cricket Stadium, Visakhapatnam, India	19 March 2023
Last updated: 19 March 2023

==== Narrowest loss margins (by runs) ====
The narrowest loss of India in terms of runs is by 1 run suffered four times.

Rank	Margin	Opposition	Venue	Date
1	1 run	England	Barabati Stadium, Cuttack, India	27 December 1984
1	1 run	Australia	M. A. Chidambaram Stadium, Chennai, India	7 October 1987 ‡
1	1 run	Australia	Brisbane Cricket Ground, Brisbane, Australia	1 March 1992 ‡
1	1 run	West Indies	Sabina Park, Kingston, Jamaica	20 May 2006
5	2 runs	West Indies	Sardar Patel Stadium, Ahmedabad, India	7 January 1988
5	2 runs	Sri Lanka	Ranasinghe Premadasa Stadium, Colombo, Sri Lanka	17 August 1997
5	2 runs	England	Arun Jaitley Stadium, New Delhi, India	31 January 2002
Last updated: 1 July 2020

==== Narrowest loss margins (by balls remaining) ====
Rank	Balls remaining	Margin	Opposition	Venue	Date
1	0	1 wicket	Pakistan	Sharjah Cricket Stadium, Sharjah, United Arab Emirates	18 April 1986
1	0	4 wickets	England	Sawai Mansingh Stadium, Jaipur, India	18 January 1993
1	0	2 wickets	Pakistan	Brisbane Cricket Ground, Brisbane, Australia	10 January 2000
1	0	4 wickets	West Indies	Keenan Stadium, Jamshedpur, India	6 November 2002
1	0	3 wickets	Pakistan	Sardar Patel Stadium, Ahmedabad, India	12 April 2005
Last updated: 1 July 2020

==== Narrowest loss margins (by wickets) ====
India has suffered defeat by 6 times.

Rank	Margin	Opposition	Venue	Date
1	1 wicket	Pakistan	Sharjah Cricket Stadium, Sharjah, United Arab Emirates	18 April 1986
1	1 wicket	Zimbabwe	Barkatullah Khan Stadium, Jodhpur, India	8 December 2000
1	1 wicket	Zimbabwe	Nahar Singh Stadium, Faridabad, India	7 March 2002
1	1 wicket	West Indies	Sabina Park, Kingston, Jamaica	30 June 2013
1	1 wicket	Pakistan	Shere-e-Bangla Stadium, Mirpur, Bangladesh	2 March 2014
1	1 wicket	Bangladesh	Shere-e-Bangla Stadium, Mirpur, Bangladesh	4 December 2022
Last updated: 4 December 2022

==== Tied matches ====
A tie can occur when the scores of both teams are equal at the conclusion of play, provided that the side batting last has completed their innings.

There have been 44 ties in ODIs history with India involved in 10 such games.

Opposition	Venue	Date
West Indies	WACA, Perth, Australia	6 December 1991
Zimbabwe	Nehru Stadium, Indore, India	18 November 1993
Zimbabwe	Boland Park, Paarl, South Africa	27 January 1997
England	M. Chinnaswamy Stadium, Bangalore, India	27 February 2011 ‡
England	Lord's, London, England	11 September 2011
Sri Lanka	Adelaide Oval, Adelaide, Australia	14 February 2012
New Zealand	Eden Park, Auckland, New Zealand	25 January 2014
Afghanistan	Dubai International Cricket Stadium, Dubai, United Arab Emirates	25 September 2018
West Indies	APCA-VDCA Stadium, Visakhapatnam, India	24 October 2018
Sri Lanka	R. Premadasa Stadium, Colombo, Sri Lanka	2 August 2024
Last updated: 2 August 2024

== Batting records ==
=== Most career runs ===
A run is the basic means of scoring in cricket. A run is scored when the batsman hits the ball with his bat and with his partner runs the length of 22 yards (20 m) of the pitch. India's Sachin Tendulkar with 18,246 runs is the leading run scorer in ODIs.

Rank	Runs	Player	Matches	Innings	Average	100	50	Period
1	18,426 ♠	Sachin Tendulkar	463	452	44.83	49	96	1989–2012
2	15,195	Virat Kohli†	322	309	58.21	55	80	2008–2026
3	12,150	Rohit Sharma†	296	287	48.60	35	63	2007–2026
4	11,221	Sourav Ganguly	308	297	40.95	22	71	1992–2007
5	10,768	Rahul Dravid	340	314	39.15	12	82	1996–2011
6	10,599	MS Dhoni	347	294	50.23	9	73	2004–2019
7	9,378	Mohammad Azharuddin	334	308	36.92	7	58	1985-2000
8	8,609	Yuvraj Singh	301	275	36.47	14	52	2000–2017
9	7,995	Virender Sehwag	241	235	35.37	15	37	1999–2013
10	6,793	Shikhar Dhawan	167	164	44.11	17	39	2010–2022
Last updated: 07 November 2026

=== Fastest runs getter ===
Runs	Batsman	Match	Innings	Record date	Reference
1000	Shubman Gill	19	19	18 January 2023	
2000	Shubman Gill	38	38 ♠	22 October 2023	
3000	Shubman Gill	62	62	13 June 2026	
4000	Virat Kohli	96	93	19 January 2013	
5000	Virat Kohli	120	114	21 November 2013	
6000	Virat Kohli	144	136	9 November 2014	
7000	Virat Kohli	169	161	17 January 2016	
8000	Virat Kohli	183	175 ♠	15 June 2017	
9000	Virat Kohli	202	194 ♠	29 October 2017	
10000	Virat Kohli	213	205 ♠	24 October 2018	
11000	Virat Kohli	230	222 ♠	16 June 2019	
12000	Virat Kohli	251	242 ♠	2 December 2020	
13000	Virat Kohli	278	267 ♠	11 September 2023	
14000	Virat Kohli	299	287 ♠	23 February 2025	
15000	Virat Kohli	315	303 ♠	27 September 2026	
16000	Sachin Tendulkar	409	399 ♠	5 February 2008	
17000	Sachin Tendulkar	435	424 ♠	5 November 2009	
18000	Sachin Tendulkar	451	440 ♠	24 March 2011	

=== Most runs in each batting position ===
Batting position	Batsman	Innings	Runs	Average	ODI career span	Ref
Opener	Sachin Tendulkar	340	15,310 ♠	48.29	1989–2012	
Number 3	Virat Kohli†	252	13,069 ♠	61.35	2008–2026	
Number 4	Mohammad Azharuddin	137	4,605	40.39	1985–2000	
Number 5	MS Dhoni	83	3,169	50.30	2004–2019	
Number 6	MS Dhoni	129	4,164 ♠	47.31	2004–2019	
Number 7	Ravindra Jadeja†	101	2,068	31.81	2009–2026	
Number 8	Ajit Agarkar	59	679	14.76	1998–2007	
Number 9	Harbhajan Singh	35	464	17.84	1998–2015	
Number 10	Zaheer Khan	44	410	15.18	2000–2012	
Number 11	Venkatesh Prasad	42	121	5.76	1994–2000	
Last updated: 04 November 2026

=== Most runs against each team ===
Opposition	Runs	Batsman	Matches	Innings	Career span	Ref
Afghanistan	293	Rohit Sharma†	6	6	2014–2026	
Australia	3,077	Sachin Tendulkar	71	70	1991–2012	
Bangladesh	932	Virat Kohli†	17	17	2010–2025	
Bermuda	114	Virender Sehwag	1	1	2007–2007	
East Africa	65	Sunil Gavaskar	1	1	1975–1975	
England	1,546	MS Dhoni	48	44	2006–2019	
Hong Kong	127	Shikhar Dhawan	1	1	2018–2018	
Ireland	100	Shikhar Dhawan	1	1	2015–2015	
Kenya	647	Sachin Tendulkar	10	9	1996–2003	
Namibia	152	Sachin Tendulkar	1	1	2003–2003	
Nepal	74	Rohit Sharma†	1	1	2023–2023	
Netherlands	128	Shreyas Iyer†	1	1	2023	
New Zealand	1,978	Virat Kohli†	38	38	2010–2026	
Pakistan	2,526	Sachin Tendulkar	69	67	1989–2012	
Scotland	85	Gautam Gambhir	1	1	2007–2007	
South Africa	2,001	Sachin Tendulkar	57	57	1991–2011	
Sri Lanka	3,113	Sachin Tendulkar	84	80	1990–2012	
United Arab Emirates	104	Rahul Dravid	1	1	2004–2004	
West Indies	2,429	Virat Kohli†	46	44	2009–2026	
Zimbabwe	1,377	Sachin Tendulkar	34	33	1992–2004	
Last updated: 4 November 2026

=== Highest individual score ===
The fourth ODI of the Sri Lanka's tour of India in 2014 saw Rohit Sharma score the highest Individual score.

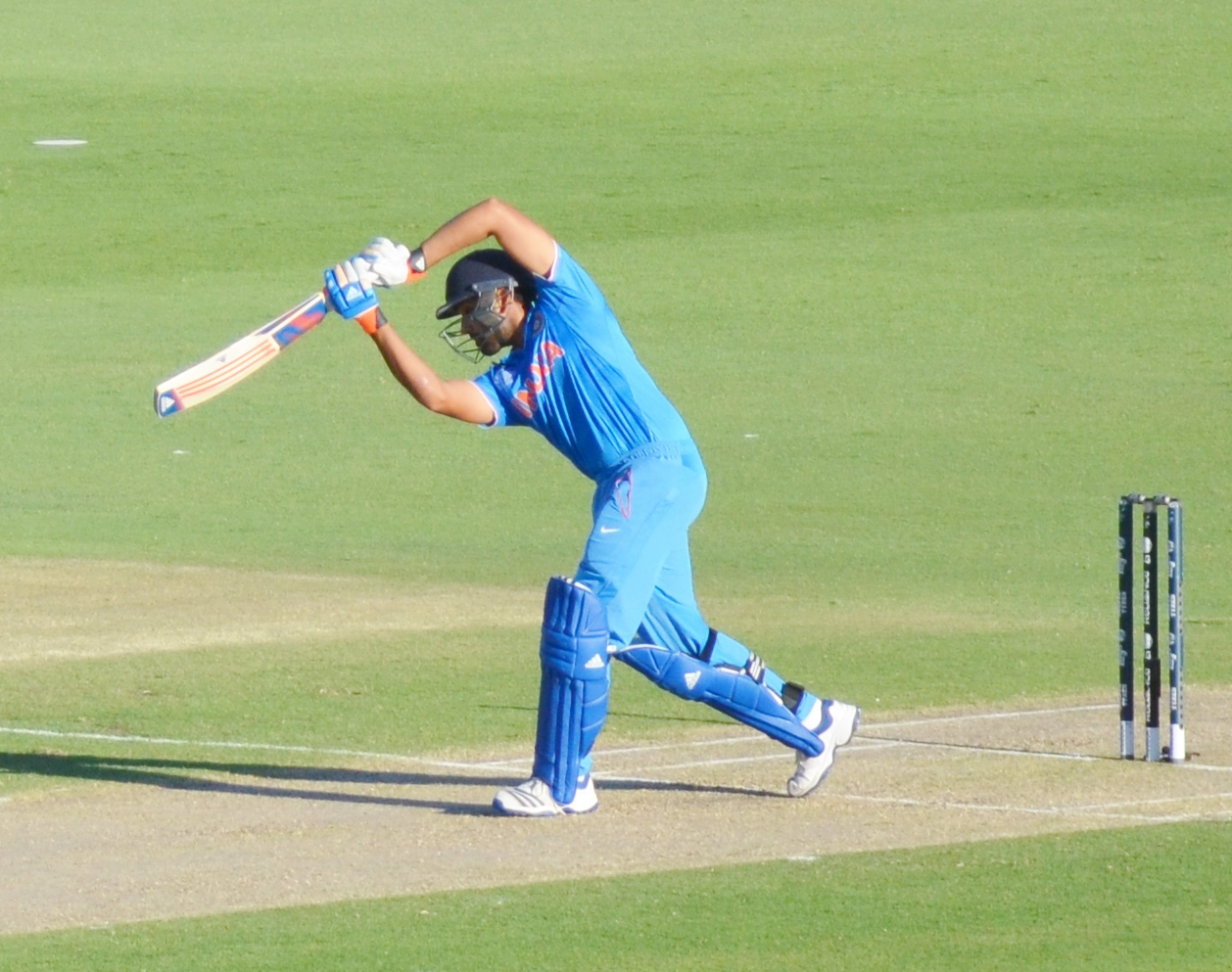
Rohit Sharma holds the world record for highest individual score.

Rank	Runs	Player	Opposition	Venue	Date
1	264 ♠	Rohit Sharma	Sri Lanka	Eden Gardens, Kolkata, India	13 November 2014
2	223*	Shubman Gill	West Indies	ACA Stadium, Guwahati, India	30 September 2026
3	219	Virender Sehwag	West Indies	Holkar Cricket Stadium, Indore, India	8 December 2011
4	210	Ishan Kishan	Bangladesh	Zahur Ahmed Chowdhury Stadium, Chattogram, Bangladesh	10 December 2022
5	209	Rohit Sharma	Australia	M. Chinnaswamy Stadium, Bangalore, India	2 November 2013
Last updated: 30 September 2026

=== Highest individual score – progression of record ===
Runs	Player	Opponent	Venue	Season
82	Brijesh Patel	England	Headingley, Leeds, England	1974
88*	Dilip Vengsarkar	England	Gandhi Stadium, Jalandhar, India	1981-82
95	Krishnamachari Srikkanth	Sri Lanka	Arun Jaitley Stadium, New Delhi, India	1982-83
175* ♠	Kapil Dev	Zimbabwe	Nevill Ground, Tunbridge Wells, England	1983 ‡
183	Sourav Ganguly	Sri Lanka	The Cooper Associates County Ground, Taunton, England	1999 ‡
186*	Sachin Tendulkar	New Zealand	Lal Bahadur Shastri Stadium, Hyderabad, India	1999-2000
200* ♠	Sachin Tendulkar	South Africa	Captain Roop Singh Stadium, Gwalior, India	2009-10
264 ♠	Rohit Sharma	Sri Lanka	Eden Gardens, Kolkata, India	2014-15
Last updated: 1 October 2026

=== Highest individual score in each batting position ===
Batting position	Batsman	Score	Opposition	Ground	Date	Ref
Opener	Rohit Sharma	264	Sri Lanka	Eden Gardens, Kolkata, India	13 November 2014	
Number 3	MS Dhoni	183*	Sri Lanka	Sawai Mansingh Stadium, Jaipur, India	31 October 2005	
Number 3	Virat Kohli	183	Pakistan	Shere Bangla National Stadium, Mirpur, Bangladesh	18 March 2012	
Number 4	Mohammad Azharuddin	153*	Zimbabwe	Barabati Stadium, Cuttack, India	9 April 1998	
Number 5	Yuvraj Singh	139	Australia	Sydney Cricket Ground, Sydney, Australia	22 January 2004	
Number 6	Kapil Dev	175*	Zimbabwe	Nevill Ground, Tunbridge Wells, England	18 June 1983	
Number 7	MS Dhoni	113*	Pakistan	MA Chidambaram Stadium, Chennai, India	30 December 2012	
Number 8	Ravindra Jadeja	77	New Zealand	Old Trafford, Manchester, England	9 July 2019	
Number 9	Jai Prakash Yadav	69	New Zealand	Queens Sports Club, Bulawayo, Zimbabwe	26 August 2005	
Number 10	Irfan Pathan	50	New Zealand	Queens Sports Club, Bulawayo, Zimbabwe	26 August 2005	
Number 11	Javagal Srinath	30	South Africa	Sharjah Cricket Stadium, Sharjah, UAE	22 March 2000	
Last Updated: 1 October 2026

=== Highest score against each opponent ===
Opposition	Runs	Player	Venue	Date	Ref
Afghanistan	154	Shubman Gill	M. A. Chidambaram Stadium, Chennai , India	17 June 2026	
Australia	209	Rohit Sharma	M. Chinnaswamy Stadium, Bangalore, India	2 November 2013	
Bangladesh	210	Ishan Kishan	Zahur Ahmed Chowdhury Stadium, Chattogram, Bangladesh	10 December 2022	
Bermuda	114	Virender Sehwag	Queens Sports Club, Port of Spain, Trinidad & Tobago	19 March 2007	
East Africa	65	Sunil Gavaskar	Headingley Cricket Ground, Leeds, England	11 June 1975	
England	150	Yuvraj Singh	Barabati Stadium, Cuttack, India	19 January 2017	
Hong Kong	127	Shikhar Dhawan	Dubai International Cricket Stadium, Dhaka, UAE	18 September 2018	
Ireland	100	Shikhar Dhawan	Seddon Park, Hamilton, New Zealand	10 March 2015	
Kenya	146	Sachin Tendulkar	Boland Park, Paarl, South Africa	24 October 2001	
Namibia	152	Sachin Tendulkar	City Oval, Pietermaritzburg, South Africa	23 February 2003	
Nepal	74*	Rohit Sharma	Pallekele International Cricket Stadium, Kandy, Sri Lanka	4 September 2023	
Netherlands	128*	Shreyas Iyer	M. Chinnaswamy Stadium, Bengaluru, India	12 November 2023 ‡	
New Zealand	208	Shubman Gill	Rajiv Gandhi International Cricket Stadium, Hyderabad, India	18 January 2023	
Pakistan	183	Virat Kohli	Shere Bangla National Stadium, Mirpur, Bangladesh	18 March 2012	
Scotland	85	Gautam Gambhir	Titwood, Glasgow, Scotland	16 August 2007	
South Africa	200*	Sachin Tendulkar	Captain Roop Singh Stadium, Gwalior, India	24 February 2010	
Sri Lanka	264	Rohit Sharma	Eden Gardens, Kolkata, India	13 November 2014	
United Arab Emirates	104	Rahul Dravid	Rangiri Dambulla International Stadium, Dambulla, Sri Lanka	16 July 2004	
West Indies	223*	Shubman Gill	Assam Cricket Association Stadium, Guwahati, India	30 September 2026	
Zimbabwe	175*	Kapil Dev	Nevill Ground, Tunbridge Wells, England	18 June 1983	
Last updated: 30 September 2026

=== Highest career average ===
A batsman's batting average is the total number of runs they have scored divided by the number of times they have been dismissed.

Rank	Average	Player	Innings	Runs	Not out	Period
1	62.50	Shubman Gill†	71	3,750	11	2019–2026
2	58.21	Virat Kohli†	309	15,195	48	2008–2026
3	51.73	KL Rahul†	93	3,570	24	2017–2026
4	50.23	MS Dhoni	294	10,599	83	2004–2019
5	48.66	Rohit Sharma†	287	12,150	37	2007–2026
Qualification: 20 innings. Last updated: 07 November 2026

=== Highest average in each batting position ===
Batting position	Batsman	Innings	Runs	Average	Career span	Ref
Opener	Shubman Gill†	65	3,330	61.66	2020–2026	
Number 3	Virat Kohli†	252	13,069	61.35	2009–2026	
Number 4	MS Dhoni	29	1,325	57.60	2005–2019	
Number 5	KL Rahul†	36	1,646	68.58	2017–2026	
Number 6	Kedar Jadhav	32	997	49.85	2004–2019	
Number 7	MS Dhoni	32	799	39.95 ♠	2004–2019	
Number 8	Ravindra Jadeja†	25	542	33.87	2009–2025	
Number 9	Praveen Kumar	22	240	21.81	2007–2012	
Number 10	Zaheer Khan	43	410	15.18	2000–2012	
Number 11	Ashish Nehra	26	83	8.30	2001–2011	
Last updated: 07 November 2026. Qualification: Min 20 innings batted at position

=== Most half-centuries ===
A half-century is a score of between 50 and 99 runs. Statistically, once a batsman's score reaches 100, it is no longer considered a half-century but a century.

Sachin Tendulkar of India has scored the most half-centuries in ODIs with 96.

Rank	Half centuries	Player	Innings	Runs	Period
1	96 ♠	Sachin Tendulkar	452	18,426	1989–2012
2	82	Rahul Dravid	314	10,768	1996–2011
3	80	Virat Kohli†	307	15,190	2008–2026
4	73	MS Dhoni	294	10,599	2004–2019
5	71	Sourav Ganguly	297	11,221	1992–2007
Last updated: 8 November 2026

=== Most centuries ===
A century is a score of 100 or more runs in a single innings.

India's Virat Kohli has also scored the most centuries in ODIs with 53, followed by Sachin Tendulkar with 49 centuries.

Rank	Centuries	Player	Innings	Runs	Period
1	55 ♠	Virat Kohli†	309	15,195	2008–2026
2	49	Sachin Tendulkar	452	18,426	1989–2012
3	35	Rohit Sharma†	287	12,150	2007–2026
4	22	Sourav Ganguly	297	11,363	1992–2007
5	17	Shikhar Dhawan	164	6,793	2010–2022
Last updated: 08 November 2026

=== Most sixes ===
Rank	Sixes	Player	Innings	Period
1	383 ♠	Rohit Sharma†	285	2007–2026
2	222	MS Dhoni	294	2004–2019
3	195	Sachin Tendulkar	452	1989–2012
4	189	Sourav Ganguly	297	1992–2007
5	182	Virat Kohli†	307	2008–2026
Last updated: 8 November 2026

=== Most fours ===
Rank	Fours	Player	Innings	Period
1	2,016 ♠	Sachin Tendulkar	452	1989–2012
2	1,416	Virat Kohli†	307	2008–2026
3	1,150	Rohit Sharma†	285	2007–2026
4	1,104	Sourav Ganguly	297	1992–2007
5	1,092	Virender Sehwag	235	1999–2013
Last updated: 8 November 2026

=== Highest strike rates ===
Rank	Strike rate	Player	Runs	Balls faced	Period
1	113.60	Yusuf Pathan	810	713	2008–2012
2	110.89	Hardik Pandya†	1,904	1,717	2016–2025
3	106.21	Rishabh Pant†	871	820	2018–2024
4	105.02	Suryakumar Yadav†	773	736	2021–2023
5	104.44	Virender Sehwag	7,995	7,655	1999–2013
Qualification= 500 balls faced. Last updated: 9 March 2025

=== Highest strike rates in an inning ===
Rank	Strike rate	Player	Runs	Balls faced	Opposition	Venue	Date
1	290.90	Zaheer Khan	32*	11	Zimbabwe	Barkatullah Khan Stadium, Jodhpur, India	8 December 2000
2	290.00	Mohammad Azharuddin	29*	10	Pakistan	Sharjah Cricket Stadium, Sharjah, United Arab Emirates	15 April 1996
3	268.00	Ajit Agarkar	67*	25	Zimbabwe	Madhavrao Scindia Cricket Ground, Rajkot, India	14 December 2000
4	253.84	Zaheer Khan	33*	13	New Zealand	Barabati Stadium, Cuttack, India	6 November 2003
5	243.75	Rishabh Pant	39	16	West Indies	APCA-VDCA Stadium, Visakhapatnam, India	18 December 2019
Last updated: 1 October 2026

=== Most runs in a calendar year ===
Tendulkar holds the record for most runs scored in a calendar year with 1894 runs scored in 1998.

Rank	Runs	Player	Matches	Innings	Year
1	1,894 ♠	Sachin Tendulkar	34	33	1998
2	1,767	Sourav Ganguly	41	41	1999
3	1,761	Rahul Dravid	43	43	1999
4	1,611	Sachin Tendulkar	32	32	1996
5	1,584	Shubman Gill†	29	29	2023
Last updated: 1 October 2026

=== Most runs in a series ===
India's Virat Kohli holds the record for most runs scored in a series with 765 runs in the 2023 Cricket World Cup in India.

Rank	Runs	Player	Matches	Innings	Series
1	765	Virat Kohli	11	11	2023 Cricket World Cup
2	673	Sachin Tendulkar	11	11	2003 Cricket World Cup
3	648	Rohit Sharma	9	9	2019 Cricket World Cup
4	597	Rohit Sharma	11	11	2023 Cricket World Cup
5	558	Virat Kohli	6	6	Indian cricket team in South Africa in 2017–18
Last updated: 20 November 2023

=== Most ducks ===
A duck refers to a batsman being dismissed without scoring a run.

Rank	Ducks	Player	Matches	Innings	Period
1	20	Sachin Tendulkar	463	452	1989–2012
2	19	Javagal Srinath	229	121	1991–2003
2	19	Virat Kohli	319	307	2008–2025
4	18	Anil Kumble	269	134	1990–2007
4	18	Yuvraj Singh	301	275	2000–2017
Last updated: 09 November 2026

== Bowling records ==
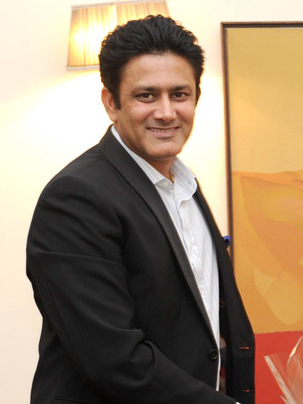
Anil Kumble has taken the most ODI wickets (334) for India.

=== Most career wickets ===
A bowler takes the wicket of a batsman when the form of dismissal is bowled, caught, leg before wicket, stumped or hit wicket. If the batsman is dismissed by run out, obstructing the field, handling the ball, hitting the ball twice or timed out the bowler does not receive credit.

Rank	Wickets	Player	Matches	Innings	Average	SR	4	5	Period
1	334	Anil Kumble	269	263	30.83	43.04	8	2	1990–2007
2	315	Javagal Srinath	229	227	28.08	37.88	7	3	1991–2003
3	288	Ajit Agarkar	191	188	27.85	32.93	10	2	1998–2007
4	269	Zaheer Khan	194	191	30.11	36.48	7	1	2000–2012
5	265	Harbhajan Singh	234	225	33.47	46.63	2	3	1998–2015
6	253	Kapil Dev	225	221	27.45	44.27	3	1	1978–1994
7	234	Ravindra Jadeja†	212	204	36.78	44.90	7	2	2009–2026
8	206	Mohammad Shami†	108	107	24.05	25.80	10	6	2013–2025
9	201	Kuldeep Yadav†	124	121	26.93	31.60	10	2	2017–2026
10	196	Venkatesh Prasad	161	160	32.30	41.47	3	1	1994–2001
Last updated: 30 September 2026

=== Fastest wicket taker ===
Wickets	Bowler	Match	Record date	Reference
50	Ajit Agarkar	23	30 September 1998	
100	Mohammed Shami	56	23 January 2019	
150	Mohammed Shami	80	12 July 2022	
200	Mohammed Shami	104	20 February 2025	
250	Ajit Agarkar	163	26 May 2006	
300	Javagal Srinath	219	12 February 2003	
Last updated: 13 July 2022

=== Most career wickets against each team ===
Opposition	Wickets	Player	Matches	Innings	Average	Period	Ref
Afghanistan	7	Ravindra Jadeja†	3	3	16.28	2014–2023	
Afghanistan	7	Gurnoor Brar†	3	3	19.42	2026-2026	
Australia	45	Kapil Dev	41	39	27.68	1980–1994	
Bangladesh	16	Ajit Agarkar	8	8	17.93	1998–2007	
Bermuda	3	Ajit Agarkar	1	1	12.66	2007–2007	
Bermuda	3	Anil Kumble	1	1	12.66	2007–2007	
East Africa	3	Madan Lal	1	1	5.00	1975–1975	
England	45	Ravindra Jadeja†	28	27	22.51	2011–2025	
Hong Kong	4	Piyush Chawla	1	1	5.75	2008–2008	
Ireland	5	Yuvraj Singh	2	1	6.20	2007–2011	
Kenya	14	Anil Kumble	7	7	13.07	1996–2001	
Namibia	4	Yuvraj Singh	1	1	1.5	2003–2003	
Nepal	3	Ravindra Jadeja†	1	1	13.33	2023–2023	
Nepal	3	Mohammed Siraj†	1	1	20.33	2023–2023	
Netherlands	4	Anil Kumble	1	1	7.5	2003–2003	
Netherlands	4	Javagal Srinath	1	1	8.00	2003–2003	
Netherlands	4	Zaheer Khan	2	2	9.25	2003–2011	
New Zealand	51	Javagal Srinath	30	30	20.41	1992–2003	
Pakistan	54	Anil Kumble	34	33	24.25	1990–2005	
Pakistan	54	Javagal Srinath	36	36	30.68	1991–2003	
Scotland	2	RP Singh	1	1	13.00	2007–2007	
Scotland	2	Munaf Patel	1	1	18.00	2007–2007	
Scotland	2	Piyush Chawla	1	1	21.00	2007–2007	
Scotland	2	Ajit Agarkar	1	1	27.00	2007–2007	
South Africa	46	Anil Kumble	40	39	32.00	1992–2006	
Sri Lanka	66	Zaheer Khan	48	48	32.19	2000–2012	
United Arab Emirates	4	Ravichandran Ashwin	1	1	6.25	2015–2015	
West Indies	46	Ravindra Jadeja†	34	34	31.39	2009–2026	
Zimbabwe	45	Ajit Agarkar	26	26	24.26	1998–2005	
Last updated: 30 September 2026

=== Best figures in an innings ===
Bowling figures refers to the number of the wickets a bowler has taken and the number of runs conceded.

Rank	Figures	Player	Opposition	Venue	Date
1	7/57	Mohammad Shami	New Zealand	Wankhede Stadium, Mumbai, India	15 November 2023‡
2	6/4	Stuart Binny	Bangladesh	Sher-e-Bangla National Cricket Stadium, Mirpur, Bangladesh	17 June 2014
3	6/12	Anil Kumble	West Indies	Eden Gardens, Kolkata, India	27 November 1993
4	6/19	Jasprit Bumrah	England	The Oval, London, England	12 July 2022
5	6/21	Mohammed Siraj	Sri Lanka	R.Premadasa Stadium, Colombo, Sri Lanka	17 September 2023
Last updated: 15 November 2023

=== Best figures in an innings – progression of record ===
Figures	Player	Opposition	Venue	Date
2/31	Eknath Solkar	England	Headingley, Leeds, England	1974
3/15	Madan Lal	East Africa	Headingley, Leeds, England	1975 ‡
4/41	Roger Binny	New Zealand	WACA, Perth, Australia	1980-81
4/30	Dilip Doshi	New Zealand	Brisbane Cricket Ground, Brisbane, Australia	1980-81
5/43	Kapil Dev	Australia	Trent Bridge, Nottingham, England	1983 ‡
5/26	Sanjeev Sharma	West Indies	Sharjah Cricket Stadium, Sharjah, United Arab Emirates	1988-89
5/21	Arshad Ayub	Pakistan	Bangabandhu National Stadium, Dhaka, Bangladesh	1988-89
5/15	Ravi Shastri	Australia	WACA, Perth, Australia	1991-92
6/12	Anil Kumble	West Indies	Eden Gardens, Kolkata, India	1993-94
6/4	Stuart Binny	Bangladesh	Sher-e-Bangla National Cricket Stadium, Mirpur, Bangladesh	2014
7/57	Mohammad Shami	New Zealand	Wankhede Stadium, Mumbai, India	2023 ‡
Last updated: 15 November 2023

=== Best bowling figure against each opponent ===
Opposition	Figures	Player	Venue	Date	Ref
Afghanistan	5/23	Prasidh Krishna	M. A. Chidambaram Stadium, Chennai, India	20 June 2026	
Australia	6/27	Murali Kartik	Wankhede Stadium, Mumbai, India	17 October 2007	
Bangladesh	6/4	Stuart Binny	Shere Bangla National Stadium, Mirpur, Bangladesh	17 June 2014	
Bermuda	3/38	Ajit Agarkar	Queen's Park Oval, Port of Spain, Trinidad & Tobago	19 March 2007 ‡	
Bermuda	3/38	Anil Kumble	Queen's Park Oval, Port of Spain, Trinidad & Tobago	19 March 2007 ‡	
East Africa	3/15	Madan Lal	Headingley Cricket Ground, Leeds, England	11 June 1975 ‡	
England	6/19	Jasprit Bumrah	The Oval, London, England	12 July 2022	
Hong Kong	4/23	Piyush Chawla	National Stadium, Karachi, Pakistan	25 June 2008	
Ireland	5/31	Yuvraj Singh	M. Chinnaswamy Stadium, Bangalore, India	6 March 2011 ‡	
Kenya	4/23	Venkatesh Prasad	Eden Gardens, Kolkata, India	31 May 1998	
Namibia	4/6	Yuvraj Singh	City Oval, Pietermaritzburg, South Africa	23 February 2003	
Nepal	3/40	Ravindra Jadeja	Pallekele, Kandy, Sri Lanka	4 September 2023	
Netherlands	4/30	Javagal Srinath	Boland Park, Paarl, South Africa	12 February 2003	
New Zealand	7/57	Mohammad Shami	Wankhede Stadium, Mumbai, India	15 November 2023 ‡	
Pakistan	5/16	Sourav Ganguly	Toronto Cricket, Skating and Curling Club Ground, Toronto, Canada	18 September 1997	
Scotland	2/26	RP Singh	Titwood, Glasgow, Scotland	16 August 2007	
South Africa	5/6	Sunil Joshi	Gymkhana Club Ground, Nairobi, Kenya	26 September 1999	
Sri Lanka	6/21	Mohammed Siraj	R. Premadasa Stadium, Colombo, Sri Lanka	17 September 2023	
United Arab Emirates	4/25	Ravichandran Ashwin	WACA Ground, Perth, Australia	28 February 2015 ‡	
West Indies	6/12	Anil Kumble	Eden Gardens, Kolkata, India	27 November 1993	
Zimbabwe	6/48	Amit Mishra	Queens Sports Club, Bulawayo, Zimbabwe	3 August 2013	
Last updated: 17 September 2023

=== Best career average ===
A bowler's bowling average is the total number of runs they have conceded divided by the number of wickets they have taken.

Rank	Average	Player	Wickets	Runs	Balls	Period
1	23.74	Jasprit Bumrah†	151	3,509	4,580	2016–2023
2	24.05	Mohammed Shami†	206	4,955	5,326	2013–2025
3	25.32	Mohammed Siraj†	76	1,925	2,137	2019–2026
4	26.76	Kuldeep Yadav†	200	5,352	6,324	2017–2026
5	27.13	Yuzvendra Chahal†	121	3,283	3,739	2015–2023
Qualification: 2,000 balls. Last updated: 30 September 2026

=== Best career economy rate ===
A bowler's economy rate is the total number of runs they have conceded divided by the number of overs they have bowled.

Rank	Economy rate	Player	Wickets	Runs	Balls	Period
1	3.71	Kapil Dev	253	6,945	11,202	1978–1994
2	3.95	Maninder Singh	66	2,066	3,133	1983–1993
3	4.05	Madan Lal	73	2,137	3,164	1974–1987
4	4.21	Ravi Shastri	129	4,650	6,613	1981–1992
5	4.27	Manoj Prabhakar	157	4,534	6,360	1984–1996
Qualification: 2,000 balls. Last updated: 1 July 2020

=== Best career strike rate ===
A bowler's strike rate is the total number of balls they have bowled divided by the number of wickets they have taken.

Rank	Strike rate	Player	Wickets	Runs	Balls	Period
1	25.80	Mohammed Shami†	206	4,955	5,326	2013–2025
2	29.60	Mohammed Siraj†	76	1,925	2,251	2019–2026
3	30.90	Yuzvendra Chahal†	121	3,283	3,739	2016–2023
4	31.00	Jasprit Bumrah†	151	3,585	4,694	2016–2026
5	31.60	Kuldeep Yadav†	200	5,352	6,324	2017–2026
Qualification: 2,000 balls. Last updated: 30 September 2026

=== Most four-wickets (& over) hauls in an innings ===
Rank	Four-wicket hauls	Player	Matches	Innings	Wickets	Period
1	16	Mohammed Shami†	108	107	206	2013–2025
2	12	Kuldeep Yadav†	123	120	200	2017–2026
2	12	Ajit Agarkar	191	188	288	1998–2007
4	10	Javagal Srinath	229	227	315	1991–2003
4	10	Anil Kumble	269	263	334	1990–2007
Last updated: 30 September 2026

=== Most five-wicket hauls in a match ===
A five-wicket haul refers to a bowler taking five wickets in a single innings.

Rank	Five-wicket hauls	Player	Matches	Innings	Wickets	Period
1	6	Mohammed Shami†	108	107	206	2013–2025
2	3	Harbhajan Singh	234	225	265	1998–2015
2	3	Javagal Srinath	229	227	315	1991–2003
4	2	Krishnamachari Srikkanth	146	33	25	1981–1992
4	2	Amit Mishra	36	34	64	2003–2016
4	2	Yuzvendra Chahal†	72	69	121	2016–2023
4	2	Jasprit Bumrah†	91	90	151	2016–2026
4	2	Ashish Nehra	117	117	155	2001–2011
4	2	Robin Singh	136	117	69	1989–2001
4	2	Irfan Pathan	120	118	173	2004–2012
4	2	Kuldeep Yadav†	123	120	200	2017–2026
4	2	Manoj Prabhakar	130	127	157	1984–1996
4	2	Sourav Ganguly	308	170	100	1992–2007
4	2	Ajit Agarkar	191	188	288	1998–2007
4	2	Ravindra Jadeja†	212	204	234	2009–2026
4	2	Anil Kumble	269	263	334	1990–2007
4	2	Sachin Tendulkar	463	270	154	1989–2012
Last updated: 30 September 2026

=== Best economy rates in an inning ===
Rank	Economy	Player	Overs	Runs	Wickets	Opposition	Venue	Date
1	0.50	Bishen Bedi	12	6	1	East Africa	Headingley, Leeds, England	11 June 1975 ‡
2	0.57	Kapil Dev	7	4	0	West Indies	Queen's Park Oval, Port of Spain, Trinidad & Tobago	9 March 1989
3	0.60	Sunil Joshi	10	6	5	South Africa	Gymkhana Club Ground, Nairobi, Kenya	26 September 1999
4	0.83	Kapil Dev	6	5	1	Australia	WACA, Perth, Australia	8 December 1991
5	1.00	Maninder Singh	9	9	1	Bangladesh	MA Aziz Stadium, Chittagong, Bangladesh	27 October 1988
5	1.00	Manoj Prabhakar	5	5	3	Pakistan	National Stadium, Karachi, Pakistan	20 December 1989
Qualification: 30 balls bowled Last updated: 1 July 2020

=== Best strike rates in an inning ===
Rank	Strike rate	Player	Wickets	Runs	Balls	Opposition	Venue	Date
1	4.25	Virender Sehwag	4	6	17	Bangladesh	Rangiri Dambulla International Stadium, Dambulla, Sri Lanka	16 June 2010
2	4.50	Kuldeep Yadav	4	6	18	West Indies	Kensington Oval, Bridgetown, Barbados	27 July 2023
3	4.66	Stuart Binny	6	4	28	Bangladesh	Shere-e-Bangla Stadium, Mirpur, Bangladesh	17 June 2014
4	6.00	Robin Singh	5	22	30	Sri Lanka	Nehru Stadium, Guwahati, India	22 December 1997
4	6.00	Sourav Ganguly	4	21	24	Sri Lanka	Vidarbha Cricket Association Ground, Nagpur, India	22 March 1999
4	6.00	Yuzvendra Chahal	4	17	24	West Indies	Queen's Sports Club, Port of Spain, Trinidad & Tobago	27 July 2022
Last updated: 22 August 2022

=== Most runs conceded in a match ===
Rank	Figures	Player	Overs	Opposition	Venue	Date
1	1/106	Bhuvneshwar Kumar	10	South Africa	Wankhede Stadium, Mumbai, India	25 October 2015
2	1/102	Vinay Kumar	9	Australia	M. Chinnaswamy Stadium, Bangalore, India	2 November 2013
3	0/97	Gurnoor Brar†	10	England	Lord's, London, England	19 July 2026
4	2/96	Gurnoor Brar†	10	West Indies	Assam Cricket Association Stadium, Guwahati, India	30 September 2026
5	1/92	Bhuvneshwar Kumar	10	New Zealand	Green Park Stadium, Kanpur, India	29 October 2017
Last updated:30 September 2026

=== Most wickets in a calendar year ===
Pakistan's Saqlain Mushtaq holds the record for most wickets taken in a year when he took 69 wickets in 1997 in 36 ODIs. India's Anil Kumble is joint-fifth on the list, having taken 61 wickets in 1996.

Rank	Wickets	Player	Matches	Innings	Year
1	61	Anil Kumble	32	32	1996
2	58	Ajit Agarkar	30	30	1998
3	52	Ravindra Jadeja	34	34	2013
4	49	Kuldeep Yadav†	30	29	2023
5	47	Irfan Pathan	28	28	2004
Last updated: 1 January 2024

=== Most wickets in a series ===
Rank	Wickets	Player	Matches	Series
1	24	Mohammed Shami	7	2023 Cricket World Cup
2	21	Zaheer Khan	9	2011 Cricket World Cup
3	20	Jasprit Bumrah	11	2023 Cricket World Cup
3	20	Kapil Dev	12	1985–86 Australian Tri-Series
5	18	Amit Mishra	5	Indian cricket team in Zimbabwe in 2013
5	18	Javagal Srinath	7	Indian cricket team in New Zealand in 2002–03
5	18	Roger Binny	8	1983 Cricket World Cup
5	18	Umesh Yadav	8	2015 Cricket World Cup
5	18	Jasprit Bumrah	9	2019 Cricket World Cup
5	18	Zaheer Khan	11	2003 Cricket World Cup
Last updated: 16 November 2023

=== Hat-trick ===
In cricket, a hat-trick occurs when a bowler takes three wickets with consecutive deliveries. The deliveries may be interrupted by an over bowled by another bowler from the other end of the pitch or the other team's innings, but must be three consecutive deliveries by the individual bowler in the same match. Only wickets attributed to the bowler count towards a hat-trick; run outs do not count. In ODIs history there have been just 49 hat-tricks.

No.	Bowler	Against	Dismissals	Venue	Date	Ref.
1	Chetan Sharma	New Zealand	Ken Rutherford (b); Ian Smith (b); Ewen Chatfield (b)	(India) Vidarbha Cricket Association Ground, Nagpur	31 October 1987 ‡	
2	Kapil Dev	Sri Lanka	Roshan Mahanama (c †Kiran More); Rumesh Ratnayake (lbw); Sanath Jayasuriya (c Sanjay Manjrekar)	(India) Eden Gardens, Calcutta	4 January 1991	
3	Kuldeep Yadav †	Australia	Matthew Wade (b); Ashton Agar (lbw); Pat Cummins (c MS Dhoni)	(India) Eden Gardens, Kolkata	21 September 2017	
4	Mohammed Shami †	Afghanistan	Mohammad Nabi (c Hardik Pandya); Aftab Alam (b); Mujeeb Ur Rahman (b)	(England) The Rose Bowl, Southampton	22 June 2019 ‡	
5	Kuldeep Yadav †	West Indies	Shai Hope (c Virat Kohli); Jason Holder (st Rishabh Pant); Alzarri Joseph (c Kedar Jadhav)	(India) APCA-VDCA Stadium, Visakhapatnam	18 December 2019	

== Wicket-keeping records ==
The wicket-keeper is a specialist fielder who stands behind the stumps being guarded by the batsman on strike and is the only member of the fielding side allowed to wear gloves and leg pads.

=== Most career dismissals ===
A wicket-keeper can be credited with the dismissal of a batsman in two ways, caught or stumped. A fair catch is taken when the ball is caught fully within the field of play without it bouncing after the ball has touched the striker's bat or glove holding the bat, Laws 5.6.2.2 and 5.6.2.3 state that the hand or the glove holding the bat shall be regarded as the ball striking or touching the bat while a stumping occurs when the wicket-keeper puts down the wicket while the batsman is out of his ground and not attempting a run.

Rank	Dismissals	Player	Matches	Innings	Catches	Stumping	Dis/inn	Period
1	438	MS Dhoni	347	342	318	120	1.280	2004–2019
2	154	Nayan Mongia	140	139	110	44	1.107	1994-2000
3	90	Kiran More	94	93	63	27	0.967	1984–1993
4	86	Rahul Dravid	340	72	72	14	1.194	1996–2011
5	85	KL Rahul†	103	60	76	9	1.416	2016–2026
Last updated: 8 November 2026

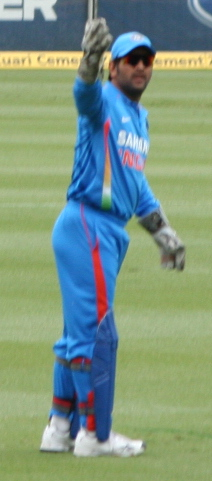
Mahendra Singh Dhoni holds the Indian record for most dismissals among wicket keepers.

=== Most career catches ===
Rank	Catches	Player	Matches	Innings	Period
1	318	MS Dhoni	347	342	2004–2019
2	110	Nayan Mongia	140	139	1994-2000
3	76	KL Rahul†	103	60	2016–2026
4	72	Rahul Dravid	340	72	1996–2011
5	63	Kiran More	94	93	1984–1993
Last updated: 8 November 2026

=== Most career stumpings ===
Rank	Stumpings	Player	Matches	Innings	Period
1	123 ♠	MS Dhoni	347	342	2004–2019
2	44	Nayan Mongia	140	139	1994-2000
3	27	Kiran More	94	93	1984–1993
4	15	Chandrakant Pandit	36	33	1986–1992
5	14	Rahul Dravid	340	72	1996–2011
Last updated: 1 July 2020

=== Most dismissals in an innings ===
Rank	Dismissals	Player	Opposition	Venue	Date
1	6	MS Dhoni	England	Headingley, Leeds, England	2 September 2007
2	5	Syed Kirmani	Zimbabwe	Grace Road, Leicester, England	11 June 1983 ‡
2	5	Sadanand Viswanath	England	Sydney Cricket Ground, Sydney, Australia	26 February 1985
2	5	Kiran More	New Zealand	Sharjah Cricket Stadium, Sharjah, United Arab Emirates	27 March 1988
2	5	Nayan Mongia	New Zealand	Eden Park, Auckland, New Zealand	27 March 1994
2	5	Nayan Mongia	Pakistan	Toronto Cricket, Skating and Curling Club Ground, Toronto, Canada	18 September 1996
2	5	Nayan Mongia	Zimbabwe	Grace Road, Leicester, England	19 May 1999 ‡
2	5	M. S. K. Prasad	Kenya	Gymkhana Club Ground, Nairobi, Kenya	29 September 1999
2	5	MS Dhoni	Bangladesh	Shere-e-Bangla Stadium, Mirpur, Bangladesh	27 December 2004
2	5	MS Dhoni	Australia	Melbourne Cricket Ground, Melbourne, Australia	10 February 2008
2	5	MS Dhoni	Sri Lanka	Rangiri Dambulla International Stadium, Dambulla, Sri Lanka	24 June 2010
Last updated: 1 July 2020

=== Most dismissals in a series ===
Rank	Dismissals	Player	Matches	Innings	Series
1	21	MS Dhoni	10	9	2007–08 Commonwealth Bank Series
2	17	KL Rahul	11	11	2023 Cricket World Cup
3	16	Rahul Dravid	11	11	2003 Cricket World Cup
4	15	MS Dhoni	8	8	2015 Cricket World Cup
5	14	Syed Kirmani	8	8	1983 Cricket World Cup
Last updated: 17 December 2023

== Fielding records ==
=== Most career catches ===
Caught is one of the nine methods a batsman can be dismissed in cricket. (Note: In 2017, The Laws of Cricket were amended, reducing the methods of dismissals from ten to nine, with handled the ball now covered as part of obstructing the field.) The majority of catches are caught in the slips, located behind the batsman, next to the wicket-keeper, on the off side of the field. Most slip fielders are top order batsmen.

Rank	Catches	Player	Matches	Innings	Ct/inn	Period
1	173	Virat Kohli†	322	318	0.544	2008–2026
2	156	Mohammad Azharuddin	334	332	0.469	1985–2000
3	140	Sachin Tendulkar	463	456	0.307	1989–2012
4	124	Rahul Dravid	340	265	0.467	1996–2011
5	113	Rohit Sharma†	293	291	0.388	2007–2026
Last updated: 8 November 2026

=== Most catches in an innings ===
Rank	Dismissals	Player	Opposition	Venue	Date
1	4	Sunil Gavaskar	Pakistan	Sharjah Cricket Stadium, Sharjah, United Arab Emirates	22 March 1985
1	4	Mohammad Azharuddin	Pakistan	Toronto Cricket, Skating and Curling Club Ground, Toronto, Canada	13 September 1997
1	4	Sachin Tendulkar	Pakistan	Bangabandhu National Stadium, Dhaka, Bangladesh	11 January 1998
1	4	Rahul Dravid	West Indies	Toronto Cricket, Skating and Curling Club Ground, Toronto, Canada	14 September 1999
1	4	Mohammad Kaif	Sri Lanka	New Wanderers Stadium, Johannesburg, South Africa	10 March 2003 ‡
1	4	V. V. S. Laxman	Zimbabwe	WACA, Perth, Australia	3 February 2004
1	4	Shikhar Dhawan	Bangladesh	Dubai International Cricket Stadium, Dubai, United Arab Emirates	18 September 2018
Last updated: 1 July 2020

=== Most catches in a series ===
Rank	Catches	Player	Matches	Innings	Series
1	12	V. V. S. Laxman	10	10	2003–04 VB Series
2	8	Mohammad Azharuddin	12	12	World Championship of Cricket
2	8	Anil Kumble	7	7	1996 Cricket World Cup
2	8	Dinesh Mongia	11	11	2003 Cricket World Cup
2	8	Virender Sehwag	11	11	2003 Cricket World Cup
2	8	Umesh Yadav	8	8	2015 Cricket World Cup
Last updated: 1 July 2020

== All-round records ==
=== 1000 runs and 100 wickets ===
A total of 64 players have achieved the double of 1000 runs and 100 wickets in their ODI career.

Rank	Player	Average difference	Period	Matches	Runs	Bat avg	Wickets	Bowl avg
1	Sourav Ganguly	2.60	1992–2007	308	11,221	40.95	100	38.35
2	Sachin Tendulkar	0.35	1989–2012	463	18,426	44.83	154	44.48
3	Yuvraj Singh	-1.94	2000–2017	301	8,609	36.47	110	38.42
4	Ravindra Jadeja†	-4.48	2009–2026	212	2,905	32.30	234	36.78
5	Kapil Dev	-3.65	1978–1994	225	3,783	23.79	253	27.45
6	Manoj Prabhakar	-4.74	1984–1996	130	1,858	24.12	157	28.87
7	Irfan Pathan	-6.32	2004–2012	120	1,544	23.39	173	29.72
8	Ravi Shastri	-6.99	1981–1992	150	3,108	29.04	129	36.04
9	Ajit Agarkar	-13.26	1998–2007	191	1,269	14.58	288	27.85
10	Harbhajan Singh	-20.14	1998–2015	234	1,213	13.32	265	33.47
Last updated: 11 January 2026

=== 250 runs and 5 wickets in a series ===
A total of 50 players on 103 occasions have achieved the double of 250 runs and 5 wickets in a series.

Player	Matches	Runs	Wickets	Series
Kapil Dev	8	303	12	1983 Cricket World Cup
Sachin Tendulkar	5	285	8	Wills World Series
Sachin Tendulkar	5	258	5	1997–98 Silver Jubilee Independence Cup
Sourav Ganguly	5	278	6	1998–99 Pepsi Cup
Sourav Ganguly	7	379	6	1999 Cricket World Cup
Sourav Ganguly	7	356	6	1999-2000 Carlton and United Series
Sachin Tendulkar	5	274	6	South Africa in India, 2000
Sourav Ganguly	4	264	5	Zimbabwe in India, 2001
Yuvraj Singh	7	254	5	2002 Natwest Series
Sachin Tendulkar	6	281	12	2004 Asia Cup
Yuvraj Singh	5	325	5	England in India, 2008
Yuvraj Singh	9	362	15	2011 Cricket World Cup
Last updated: 1 July 2020

== Other records ==
=== Most career matches ===
Rank	Matches	Player	Runs	Wkts	Period
1	463 ♠	Sachin Tendulkar	18,426	154	1989-2012
2	347	MS Dhoni	10,599	1	2004–2019
3	340	Rahul Dravid	10,768	4	1996–2011
4	334	Mohammad Azharuddin	9,378	12	1985–2000
5	322	Virat Kohli†	15,195	5	2008–2026
Last updated: 8 November 2026

=== Most consecutive career matches ===
Rank	Matches	Player	Period
1	185 ♠	Sachin Tendulkar	1990-1998
2	126	Mohammad Azharuddin	1991–1997
3	102	Virat Kohli	2010–2014
4	96	Ajay Jadeja	1995-1998
5	88	Anil Kumble	1994–1997
Last updated: 1 October 2026

=== Most matches as captain ===
Rank	Matches	Player	Won	Lost	Tied	NR	Win %	Period
1	200	MS Dhoni	110	74	5	11	59.52	2007–2018
2	174	Mohammad Azharuddin	90	76	2	6	54.16	1990–1999
3	146	Sourav Ganguly	76	65	0	5	53.90	1999–2005
4	95	Virat Kohli	65	27	1	2	70.43	2013–2021
5	79	Rahul Dravid	42	33	0	4	56.00	2000–2007
Last updated: 1 October 2026

=== Most matches won as a captain ===
Rank	Won	Player	Matches	Lost	Tied	NR	Win %	Period
1	110	MS Dhoni	200	74	5	11	59.52	2007–2018
2	90	Mohammad Azharuddin	174	76	2	6	54.16	1990–1999
3	76	Sourav Ganguly	146	65	0	5	53.90	1999–2005
4	65	Virat Kohli	95	27	1	2	70.43	2013–2021
5	42	Rohit Sharma	56	12	1	1	77.27	2017–2025
Last updated: 1 October 2026

==== Most man of the match awards ====
Rank	M.O.M awards	Player	Matches	Period
1	62 ♠	Sachin Tendulkar	463	1989–2012
2	45	Virat Kohli†	319	2008–2026
3	31	Sourav Ganguly	308	1992–2007
4	27	Rohit Sharma†	293	2007–2026
4	27	Yuvraj Singh	301	2000–2017
Last updated: 8 November 2026

==== Most man of the series awards ====
Rank	M.O.S awards	Player	Matches	Period
1	14 ♠	Sachin Tendulkar	463	1989–2012
2	11	Virat Kohli†	319	2008–2026
3	7	Yuvraj Singh	301	2000–2017
4	6	Shubman Gill†	72	2019–2026
4	6	Rohit Sharma†	293	2007–2026
4	6	Sourav Ganguly	308	1992–2007
4	6	MS Dhoni	347	2004–2019
Last updated: 8 November 2026

=== Youngest players on debut ===
Rank	Age	Player	Opposition	Venue	Date
1	16 years and 238 days	Sachin Tendulkar	Pakistan	Jinnah Stadium, Gujranwala, Pakistan	18 December 1989
2	17 years and 222 days	Maninder Singh	Pakistan	National Stadium, Karachi, Pakistan	21 January 1983
3	17 years and 288 days	Harbhajan Singh	New Zealand	Sharjah Cricket Stadium, Sharjah, United Arab Emirates	17 April 1998
4	17 years and 301 days	Parthiv Patel	New Zealand	Queenstown Events Centre, Queenstown, New Zealand	4 January 2003
5	17 years and 320 days	Laxmi Ratan Shukla	Sri Lanka	Vidarbha Cricket Association Ground, Nagpur, India	22 March 1999
Last updated: 1 July 2020

=== Oldest players on debut ===
Rank	Age	Player	Opposition	Venue	Date
1	36 years and 138 days	Farokh Engineer	England	Headingley Cricket Ground, Leeds, England	13 July 1974
2	33 years and 164 days	Varun Chakravarthy	England	Barabati Stadium, Cuttack, India	9 February 2025
3	33 years and 103 days	Ajit Wadekar	England	Headingley Cricket Ground, Leeds, England	13 July 1974
4	32 years and 350 days	Dilip Doshi	Australia	Melbourne Cricket Ground, Melbourne, Australia	6 December 1980
5	32 years and 307 days	Syed Abid Ali	England	Headingley Cricket Ground, Leeds, England	13 July 1974
Last updated: 1 October 2026

=== Oldest players ===
Rank	Age	Player	Opposition	Venue	Date
1	39 years and 36 days	Mohinder Amarnath	West Indies	Wankhede Stadium, Mumbai, India	30 October 1989
2	38 years and 329 days	Sachin Tendulkar	Pakistan	Shere Bangla National Stadium, Mirpur, Bangladesh	18 March 2012
3	38 years and 248 days	Rahul Dravid	England	Sophia Gardens, Cardiff, England	16 September 2011
4	38 years and 118 days	Sunil Gavaskar	England	Wankhede Stadium, Mumbai, India	5 November 1987 ‡
5	38 years and 2 days	MS Dhoni	New Zealand	Old Trafford, Manchester, England	9 July 2019 ‡
Last updated: 1 July 2020

== Partnership records ==
In cricket, two batsmen are always present at the crease batting together in a partnership. This partnership will continue until one of them is dismissed, retires or the innings comes to a close.

=== Highest partnerships by wicket ===
A wicket partnership describes the number of runs scored before each wicket falls. The first wicket partnership is between the opening batsmen and continues until the first wicket falls. The second wicket partnership then commences between the not out batsman and the number three batsman. This partnership continues until the second wicket falls. The third wicket partnership then commences between the not out batsman and the new batsman. This continues down to the tenth wicket partnership. When the tenth wicket has fallen, there is no batsman left to partner so the innings is closed.

Wicket	Runs	First batsman	Second batsman	Opposition	Venue	Date	Scorecard
1st wicket	258	Sourav Ganguly	Sachin Tendulkar	Kenya	Boland Park, Paarl, South Africa	24 October 2001	Scorecard
2nd wicket	331	Rahul Dravid	Sachin Tendulkar	New Zealand	Lal Bahadur Shastri Stadium, Hyderabad, India	8 November 1999	Scorecard
3rd wicket	237*	Rahul Dravid	Sachin Tendulkar	Kenya	Bristol County Ground, Bristol, England	23 May 1999 ‡	Scorecard
4th wicket	275* ♠	Mohammad Azharuddin	Ajay Jadeja	Zimbabwe	Barabati Stadium, Cuttack, India	9 April 1998	Scorecard
5th wicket	223	Mohammad Azharuddin	Ajay Jadeja	Sri Lanka	R. Premadasa Stadium, Colombo, Sri Lanka	17 August 1997	Scorecard
6th wicket	160	Ambati Rayudu	Stuart Binny	Zimbabwe	Harare Sports Club, Harare, Zimbabwe	15 July 2015	Scorecard
7th wicket	125*	MS Dhoni	Ravichandran Ashwin†	Pakistan	M. A. Chidambaram Stadium, Chennai, India	12 December 2012	Scorecard
8th wicket	100*	MS Dhoni	Bhuvneshwar Kumar†	Sri Lanka	Pallekele International Cricket Stadium, Pallekele, Sri Lanka	24 August 2017	Scorecard
9th wicket	126*	Kapil Dev	Syed Kirmani	Zimbabwe	Nevill Ground, Tunbridge Wells, England	18 June 1983 ‡	Scorecard
10th wicket	64	Harbhajan Singh	Lakshmipathy Balaji	England	The Oval, London, England	3 September 2004	Scorecard
Last updated: 1 July 2020

=== Highest partnerships by runs ===
Wicket	Runs	First batsman	Second batsman	Opposition	Venue	Date	Scorecard
2nd wicket	331	Rahul Dravid	Sachin Tendulkar	New Zealand	Lal Bahadur Shastri Stadium, Hyderabad, India	8 November 1999	Scorecard
2nd wicket	318	Rahul Dravid	Sourav Ganguly	Sri Lanka	The Cooper Associates County Ground, Taunton, England	26 May 1999	Scorecard
2nd wicket	290	Ishan Kishan	Virat Kohli	Bangladesh	Zahur Ahmed Chowdhury Stadium, Chattogram, Bangladesh	10 December 2022	Scorecard
4th wicket	275*	Mohammad Azharuddin	Ajay Jadeja	Zimbabwe	Barabati Stadium, Cuttack, India	9 April 1998	Scorecard
1st wicket	258	Sourav Ganguly	Sachin Tendulkar	Kenya	Boland Park, Paarl, South Africa	24 October 2001	Scorecard
Last updated: 10 December 2022

=== Highest overall partnership runs by a pair ===
Rank	Runs	Innings	Players	Highest	Average	100	50	Career span
1	8,227 ♠	176	Sourav Ganguly & Sachin Tendulkar	258	47.55	26	29	1992–2007
2	5,806	106	Virat Kohli & Rohit Sharma†	246	58.06	21	18	2010–2026
3	5,193	117	Shikhar Dhawan & Rohit Sharma	210	45.15	18	15	2011–2022
4	4,387	114	Virender Sehwag & Sachin Tendulkar	182	39.16	13	18	2001–2012
5	4,332	87	Rahul Dravid & Sourav Ganguly	318	50.37	11	18	1996–2007
An asterisk (*) signifies an unbroken partnership (i.e. neither of the batsmen was dismissed before either the end of the allotted overs or the required score being reached). Last updated: 8 November 2026

== Umpiring records ==
=== Most matches umpired ===
An umpire in cricket is a person who officiates the match according to the Laws of Cricket. Two umpires adjudicate the match on the field, whilst a third umpire has access to video replays, and a fourth umpire looks after the match balls and other duties. The records below are only for on-field umpires.

Rank	Matches	Umpire	Period
1	64	Nitin Menon†	2017–2026
2	52	Srinivas Venkataraghavan	1993–2003
3	51	Amiesh Saheba	2000–2011
4	48	Sundaram Ravi	2011–2019
5	43	V. K. Ramaswamy	1983–2002
5	43	Chettithody Shamshuddin	2013–2020
Last updated: 1 October 2026

== See also ==
- List of One Day International cricket records
- List of India Test cricket records
- List of India Twenty20 International records
- India at the Cricket World Cup
- Republic of India
