= Barbara Henry Farquhar =

Scottish essayist (1815–1875)

Barbara Henry Farguhar
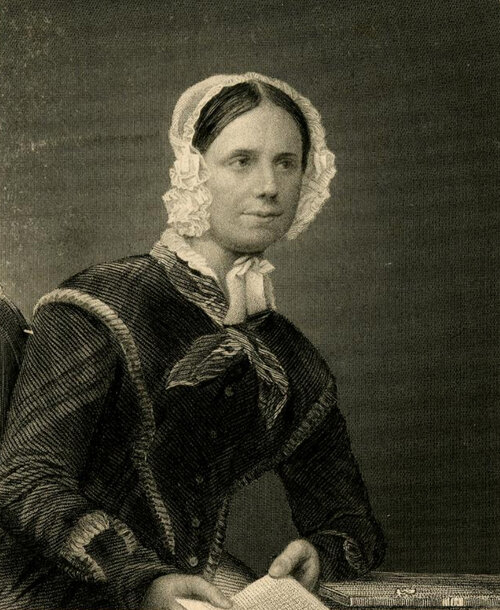
- Born: Smith c. 1815 Peterculter, Aberdeenshire, Scotland
- Died: 12 March 1875 London, England
- Notable works: The Pearl of Days: or The Advantages of the Sabbath to the Working Classes, by a Labourer’s Daughter, With a Sketch of the Author’s Life, by Herself (1848); Real Religion: Or The Practical Application Of Holy Scripture To The Daily Walk Of Life (1850); Female Education; its Importance, Design, and Nature Considered (1851); Poems (1863)
- Spouse: James Williamson Farquhar

Barbara Henry Farquhar (née Smith; 1815 – 12 March 1875) was a Scottish essayist, who promoted the benefits of observing Sunday rest day for the working classes and the intellectual equality of the sexes. She wrote the award-winning essay "The Pearl of Days: or, the advantages of the Sabbath to the working classes, by 'A Labourer's Daughter'".

== Early life ==
She was born in Peterculter, Aberdeenshire, to working-class parents Lilias Smith and Morison Smith, who was a gardener at Ayton Garden House, Ayton, Berwickshire (citation Scotland Census 1841). She was the eldest of ten children and received only minimal formal education. According to her own accounts she worked as a domestic servant and helped in her family home. At the age of twenty-five, while living in Ayton, she entered an essay competition open only to working men on the value of the Sabbath, with an accompanying letter arguing that the topic was of equal importance to the sexes and therefore should not exclude one of them.

== Later life and career ==
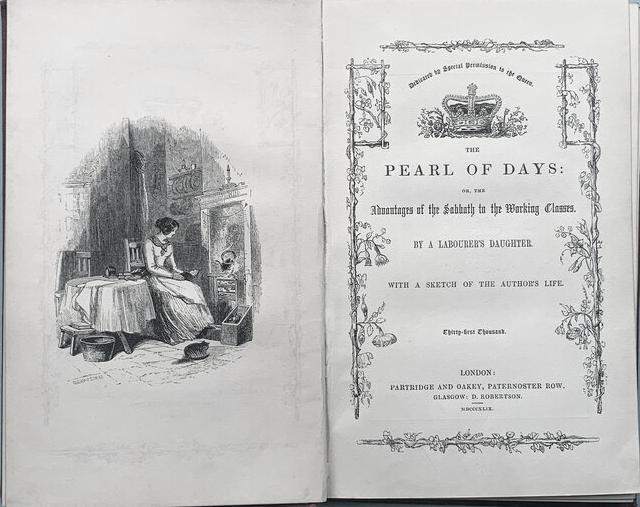
The Pearl of Days

Although Farquhar's essay was not eligible for the entry to the competition, one of the judges Lord Ashley of Shaftsbury took note of the unusual quality and showed it to Queen Victoria and the Prince Consort Albert, who praised it publicly. This led to an immensely successful publication which sold over 100,000 copies within four years, subsequent editions in the US, as well as translations into various languages, including German.

In the foreword of the essay Farquhar credits her parents for her education and praises her mother particularly for "[...] imparting intelligence ... and implanting moral principle" in her children. She stresses the need of a day of leisure for the working classes, as ensured by observing Sabbath on Sundays, to improve themselves and learn beyond the restrictions of their professions, as shown in her own education.

She married James Williamson Farquhar in 1850. They ran a school together in Cupar for a while but later moved to London.

== Death ==
Little is known of Farquhar's life after her marriage but she died at the age of around sixty on 12 March 1875.
