= John Mortimer (cricketer) =

Scottish cricketer (1911–1967)

Personal information
- Full name: John Mortimer
- Born: 13 January 1911; Peterculter, Aberdeenshire, Scotland
- Died: 22 March 1967 (aged 56); Aberdeen, Aberdeenshire, Scotland
- Batting: Right-handed
- Bowling: Right-arm off-break
- Relatives: Colin Smith (grandson)

Domestic team information
- Years: Team
- 1932–1933: Scotland

Career statistics
| Competition | First-class |
|---|---|
| Matches | 2 |
| Runs scored | 20 |
| Batting average | 19. 22 |
| 100s/50s | –/– |
| Top score | 18 |
| Balls bowled | 363 |
| Wickets | 8 |
| Bowling average | 19. 25 |
| 5 wickets in innings | – |
| 10 wickets in match | – |
| Best bowling | 3/67 |
| Catches/stumpings | 3/– |
- Source: Cricinfo, 18 July 2022

John Mortimer (13 January 1911 – 22 March 1967) was a Scottish first-class cricketer and administrator.

Moritmer was born in January 1911 at Peterculter, Aberdeenshire. Like his father and two uncles before him, Mortimer played club cricket for Aberdeenshire Cricket Club and was a member of the Aberdeenshire team which won the Scottish Counties' Championship four years in a row from 1946 to 1949. He played first-class cricket for Scotland on two occasions, playing against the touring South Americans at Edinburgh in 1932, and against Ireland at Belfast in 1933. Described by Wisden as a "medium pace off-break bowler and aggressive batsman", Mortimer took 8 wickets in his two first-class matches at an average of 19.25, with best figures of 3 for 67; as a batsman, he scored 20 runs with a highest score of 18. After concluding his playing career, Mortimer served as the honorary secretary of Aberdeenshire Cricket Club from 1951 to 1963, in addition to serving as president of the Scottish Counties' Cricket Board. Mortimer died at Aberdeen in March 1967. His grandson, Colin Smith, played cricket internationally for Scotland.
