= Indian cricket team in Scotland in 2007 =

2007 cricket match between India and Scotland

	India	Scotland
- Dates: 16 August – 17 August 2007
Captains	Rahul Dravid	Ryan Watson

One Day International series
- Results: India won the 1-match series 1–0
Most runs	Gautam Gambhir; 85	Gavin Hamilton; 44
Most wickets	Ajit Agarkar; R. P. Singh; Munaf Patel; Piyush Chawla; 2	Majid Haq; Craig Wright; John Blain; 1

The Indian cricket team played one One Day International against Scotland between the conclusion of the Test Series and the beginning of the ODI series against England on August 16, 2007. In what was the first ODI between the two sides, India won the rain-affected match by seven wickets.

== Squad lists ==
Scotland squad Ryan Watson (c) John Blain Gordon Drummond Gavin Hamilton Majid Haq Paul Hoffmann Neil McCallum Dewald Nel Navdeep Poonia Colin Smith (wk) Fraser Watts Craig Wright	India squad Rahul Dravid (c) Mahendra Singh Dhoni (vc/wk) Ajit Agarkar Gautam Gambhir Sourav Ganguly Dinesh Karthik Zaheer Khan Munaf Patel Piyush Chawla Ramesh Powar Rohit Sharma R. P. Singh Sachin Tendulkar Robin Uthappa Yuvraj Singh

Of the players named in the squads, Gordon Drummond (Scotland) and Sourav Ganguly, Zaheer Khan, Rohit Sharma and Sachin Tendulkar (India) did not take part in the match.

== One-off ODI ==
August 16, 2007
(scorecard)

Scotland; 203/9 (46 overs)	v	India; 212/3 (39.5 overs)
Gavin Hamilton 44 (78); R. P. Singh 2/26 (9 overs)		Gautam Gambhir 85 (115); Majid Haq 1/32 (6 overs)

India win by 7 wickets (D/L)
Titwood, Glasgow, Scotland
Umpires: Ian Gould (ENG), Ian Howell (RSA)
Player of the match: Gautam Gambhir

- Match Shortened to 46 overs per side. India chased revised target of 209 from 46 overs.

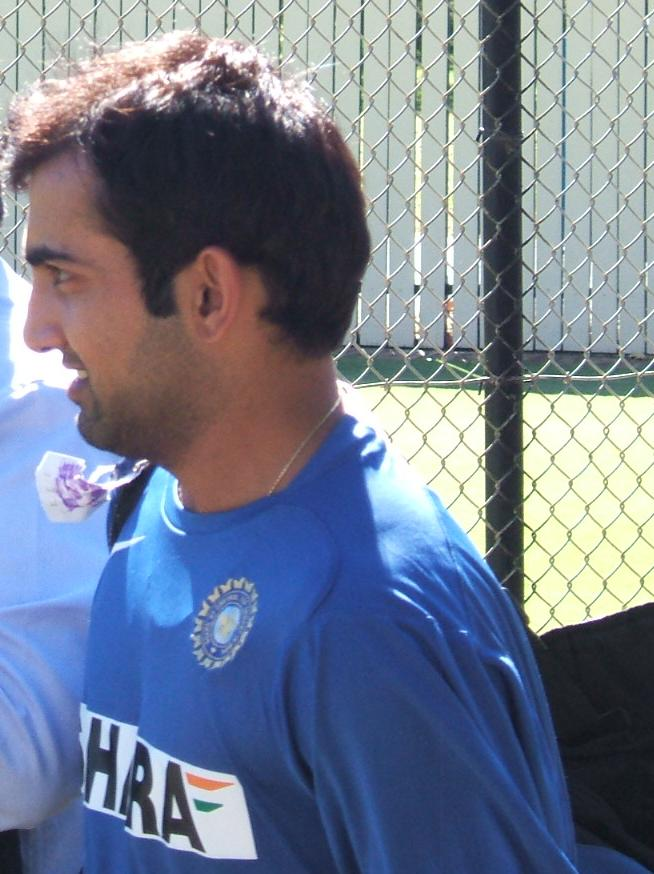
Gautam Gambhir, the man of the match.
