= Caught Napping =

1959 play

- Written by: Geoffrey Lumsden
- Original language: English
- Genre: Comedy

Premiere
- Date premiered: 22 June 1959
- Place premiered: Piccadilly Theatre, London

Caught Napping is a 1959 comedy play by the British writer Geoffrey Lumsden.

It premiered at the Salisbury Playhouse, under its original title Gwendolyn before transferring to the Piccadilly Theatre in London's West End where it ran for 114 performances between 22 June and 28 August 1959. Lumsden himself starred in the play alongside a cast that included Graham Armitage, George Benson, Raymond Huntley, Leslie Randall, Winifred Shotter and Timothy West in his West End debut. Excerpts of the play were featured in a 1959 episode of the BBC television series Theatre Night which showcased current West End shows.

In 1978 it was revived with a cast that included Arthur Lowe, Bill Pertwee, Fiona Fullerton and Edward Evans.

== Bibliography ==
- Wearing, J.P. The London Stage 1950-1959: A Calendar of Productions, Performers, and Personnel. Rowman & Littlefield, 2014.
