= Oswald Lumsden =

Scottish cricketer and soldier

Personal information
- Full name: Oswald Farquhar Lumsden
- Born: 26 June 1874; Peterculter, Aberdeenshire, Scotland
- Died: 8 April 1948 (aged 73); Edinburgh, Midlothian, Scotland
- Batting: Unknown
- Relatives: William Lumsden (brother)

Domestic team information
- Years: Team
- 1922/23: Europeans

Career statistics
Competition	First-class
Matches	1
Runs scored	17
Batting average	17.00
100s/50s	–/–
Top score	9
Catches/stumpings	1/–
- Source: ESPNcricinfo, 4 December 2022

Oswald Farquhar Lumsden (26 June 1874 — 8 April 1948) was a Scottish first-class cricketer and an officer in the Indian Civil Service.

The son of the advocate James Forbes Lumsden, he was born in June 1874 at Peterculter, Aberdeenshire. Lumsden was educated at Merchiston Castle School, before matriculating to the University of Edinburgh, where he transferred to Christ Church, Oxford. While studying at Oxford, he gained a blue in tennis. After graduating from Oxford, he joined the Indian Civil Service (ICS) in 1897. He arrived in British India in 1898, serving in the Punjab as an assistant commissioner. He was an assistant registrar of cooperative societies in the Punjab in May 1914, before becoming the controller of hostile trading concerns in January the following year. In May 1915, he was appointed a district and session judge. In January 1913, Lumsden was appointed to the Council of Sir Louis Dane, the Lieutenant-Governor of the Punjab, in January 1913. He served his successors, Michael O'Dwyer and Sir Edward MacLagan, until 1920. At the age of 48, he made a single appearance in first-class cricket for the Europeans cricket team against the Muslims at Lahore in the 1922–23 Lahore Tournament. Batting twice in the match, he was dismissed for 9 runs in the Europeans first innings by Saleh Mohammad, while in their second innings made 8 unbeaten runs. He retired from the ICS in April 1925, retiring to Edinburgh where he died in April 1948. His brother, Alfred Lumsden, was a major-general in the British Army, while his youngest brother, William Lumsden, was also a first-class cricketer. His nephew was the actor Geoffrey Lumsden.
