= Hostile Witness =

1968 British film by Ray Milland

- Detail of original British quad poster
- Directed by: Ray Milland
- Screenplay by: Jack Roffey
- Based on: play Hostile Witness by Jack Roffey
- Produced by: David E. Rose
- Starring: Ray Milland; Sylvia Syms
- Cinematography: Gerald Gibbs
- Edited by: Bernard Gribble
- Music by: Wilfred Josephs
- Production company: Caralan Productions Ltd. (as Caralan-Dador)
- Distributed by: United Artists
- Release date: November 1968 (UK)
- Running time: 101 mins
- Country: United Kingdom
- Language: English

Hostile Witness is a 1968 British courtroom drama film based on a play by Jack Roffey, directed by Ray Milland (who had appeared in the play on Broadway) and starring Milland, Sylvia Syms, Raymond Huntley and Julian Holloway.

== Plot ==
A distinguished barrister finds himself on the wrong side of the law when accused of the murder of the motorist who killed his daughter.

== Cast ==
- Ray Milland as Simon Crawford, Q.C.
- Sylvia Syms as Sheila Larkin
- Felix Aylmer as Justice Osborne
- Raymond Huntley as John Naylor
- Geoffrey Lumsden as Major Hugh Beresford Maitland
- Norman Barrs as Charles Milburn
- Julian Holloway as Percy
- Percy Marmont as Justice Matthew Gregory
- Dulcie Bowman as Lady Phyllis Gregory
- Ewan Roberts as Hamish Gillespie
- Richard Hurndall as Superintendent Eley
- Ronald Leigh-Hunt as Dr. Wimborne

== Production ==
The play debuted in 1964 starring Michael Denison and transferred to the West End.

Jay Julien bought the production rights to stage the play in the United States. In 1965, Ray Milland agreed to appear in the play in New York. It was Milland's first theatrical appearance in some years, apart from appearing in a road version of My Fair Lady.

The New York Times called it "serviceable". The show had a capitalisation of $125,000 and ended on July 2 after 157 performances. Milland then took the play on tour. The Los Angeles Times called the production "absorbing, completely satisfactory, and wholly successful thriller."

In March 1967, it was announced that Milland would star in and direct a film version for Edward Small and United Artists. Shooting began in London in July 1967 with David Rose producing.

== Critical reception ==
The Monthly Film Bulletin wrote: "Coming after the somewhat off-beat films Ray Milland has been associated with in recent years, this present piece seems an entirely conventional and unprofitable choice. Based on a play which manages to include all the hoary clichés of court-room drama, it is weighed down by extremely lifeless direction and the kind of acting associated with the lower rungs of radio drama. Milland's own performance consists mainly of worried closeups, and the few moments of tension at the end when the murderer is revealed are hardly worth the wait."

DVD Talk wrote: "It's not terrible and has its moments, but Billy Wilder's Witness for the Prosecution or your average episode of Rumpole of the Bailey is a lot more fun."

The entry in Halliwell's Film Guide states: "Complex courtroom thriller, filmed in a flatly boring way with stagey sets and performances. The plot is the only interest".

A review in the Radio Times by Joanna Berry described it as an "interesting but ultimately disappointing tale", which Berry considered "missable".
