= William Lumsden =

Scottish cricketer and soldier

Personal information
- Full name: William Forbes Lumsden
- Born: 4 September 1879; Peterculter, Aberdeenshire, Scotland
- Died: 28 October 1956 (aged 77); Nairobi, Kenya Colony
- Batting: Unknown
- Bowling: Unknown
- Relatives: Oswald Lumsden (brother)

Domestic team information
- Years: Team
- 1902/03: Europeans

Career statistics
Competition	First-class
Matches	2
Runs scored	18
Batting average	9.00
100s/50s	–/–
Top score	10*
Balls bowled	12
Wickets	0
Bowling average	–
5 wickets in innings	–
10 wickets in match	–
Best bowling	–
Catches/stumpings	2/–
- Source: Cricinfo, 4 December 2022

William Forbes Lumsden, DSO (4 September 1879 – 28 October 1956) was a British Army officer and Scottish first-class cricketer.

== Biography ==
The son of the advocate James Forbes Lumsden, he was born in September 1879 at Peterculter, Aberdeenshire. Lumsden was educated firstly at Aberdeen Grammar School, before attending Repton School in England, from which he matriculated to Trinity College, Cambridge. While studying at Cambridge, he gained a blue in golf.

After graduating from Cambridge, Lumsden was commissioned into the Royal Garrison Artillery as a second lieutenant in March 1900, with promotion to lieutenant following in 1901. Serving in British India, he made two appearances there in first-class cricket for the Europeans cricket team against the Parsees in the 1902–03 Bombay Presidency Matches, scoring 18 runs.

He progressed in the military to become an adjutant in the Territorial Force from September 1908 to October 1909, later being promoted to captain in November 1911. Lumsden was seconded for service with the Colonial Office in December 1912, where he was tasked with survey duty in Nigeria.

At the beginning of the First World War in the summer of 1914, he was restored to the Royal Garrison Artillery, with promotion to major following in December 1915. He was made an acting lieutenant colonel in June 1916, reverting to major in October of the same year. Lumsden was decorated with the Distinguished Service Order in the 1917 New Year Honours and served in the Mesopotamian campaign in the latter stages of the war.

Following the war, he was again made a temporary lieutenant colonel in January 1919, before relinquishing the rank a year later. He retired from active service in March 1921, at which point he was granted the rank of lieutenant colonel.

Returning to Scotland, Lumsden was the Unionist Party candidate for Aberdeen North in the 1923 general election, but was defeated by Labour's Frank Rose. Lumsden later died at Nairobi in Kenya Colony in October 1956.

His brother, Alfred Forbes Lumsden, was a brigadier-general in the British Army, while his elder brother, Oswald Lumsden, was also a first-class cricketer. His nephew was the actor Geoffrey Lumsden.
