= Alfred Forbes Lumsden =

British Army officer

Brigadier-General Alfred Forbes Lumsden DSO
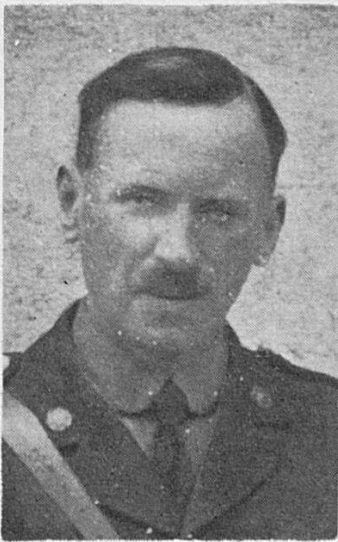
- Born: June 1877
- Died: 24 June 1918 (aged 40–41) Arras, France

Brigadier-General Alfred Forbes Lumsden, DSO (June 1877 – 24 June 1918) was a British Army officer. He was killed in action in near Arras while touring the trenches. At the time, he was in command of the 46th Brigade.

In August 1912 he was restored to the establishment.

He was made general officer commanding (GOC) of the 46th Infantry Brigade and promoted to the temporary rank of brigadier general whilst employed in this role, on 12 February 1918.

His son was the actor Geoffrey Lumsden. His brothers were Oswald Lumsden and William Lumsden.
