= Raymond Huntley =

English actor (1904–1990)

- Raymond Huntley as Sir Geoffrey Dillon in Upstairs, Downstairs (1971–1975)
- Born: Horace Raymond Huntley; 23 April 1904; King's Norton, Worcestershire, England
- Died: 15 June 1990 (aged 86); Westminster, London, England
- Occupation: Actor

Horace Raymond Huntley (23 April 1904 – 15 June 1990) was an English actor who appeared in dozens of British films from the 1930s to the 1970s. He also appeared in the ITV period drama Upstairs, Downstairs as the pragmatic family solicitor Sir Geoffrey Dillon.

== Life and career ==
=== Early life ===
Horace Raymond Huntley was born in Kings Norton, Worcestershire (now a suburb of Birmingham) in 1904.

=== Career ===
==== Stage ====
He made his stage debut at the Birmingham Repertory Theatre on 1 April 1922, in A Woman Killed with Kindness. His London debut followed at the Court Theatre on 22 February 1924, in As Far as Thought can Reach.

He subsequently inherited the role of Count Dracula from Edmund Blake in Hamilton Deane's touring adaptation of Dracula, which arrived at London's Little Theatre on 14 February 1927, subsequently transferring to the larger Duke of York's Theatre. Later that year he was offered the chance to reprise the role on Broadway (in a script streamlined by John L. Balderston); when he declined, the part was taken by Bela Lugosi instead. Huntley did, however, appear in a US touring production of the Deane/Balderston play, covering the east coast and midwest, from 1928 to 1930. "I have always considered the role of Count Dracula to have been an indiscretion of my youth," he recalled in 1989.

After Dracula he made his Broadway debut at the Vanderbilt Theatre on 23 February 1931, in The Venetian Glass Nephew. On returning to the UK, his many West End appearances included The Farmer's Wife (Queen's Theatre 1932), Cornelius (Duchess Theatre 1935), Bees on the Boat Deck (Lyric Theatre 1936) Time and the Conways (Duchess Theatre 1937), When We Are Married (St Martin's Theatre 1938), Rebecca (Queen's Theatre 1940; Strand Theatre 1942), They Came to a City (Globe Theatre 1943), The Late Edwina Black (Ambassadors Theatre 1948), And This Was Odd (Criterion Theatre 1951), Double Image (Savoy Theatre 1956), Any Other Business (Westminster Theatre 1958), Caught Napping (Piccadilly Theatre 1959), Difference of Opinion (Garrick Theatre 1963), An Ideal Husband (Garrick Theatre 1966), Getting Married (Strand Theatre 1967), Soldiers (New Theatre 1968) and Separate Tables (Apollo Theatre 1977). He also starred opposite Flora Robson in the Broadway production of Black Chiffon (48th Street Theatre 1950).

==== Film and television ====
Often cast as a supercilious bureaucrat or other authority figure, Huntley was also a staple figure in British films, his many appearances including The Way Ahead, I See a Dark Stranger, Passport to Pimlico and The Dam Busters. In his later years he became well known on television as Sir Geoffrey Dillon, the family solicitor to the Bellamys in LWT's popular 1970s drama series Upstairs, Downstairs. He also appeared as Mr. Justice Downes in the Granada Television daytime series, Crown Court.; Wodehouse Playhouse, ('Romance at Droitwich Spa', episode, 1975); and Danger Man, ("The Gallows Tree" episode), as Clements.

== Death ==
Huntley died in Westminster Hospital, London in 1990. In his obituary the New York Times wrote, "During his long career the actor played judges, bank managers, churchmen, bureaucrats and other figures of authority. He could play them straight if necessary, but in comedy his natural dryness of delivery was exaggerated to the point where the character he was playing invited mockery as a pompous humbug."

== Complete filmography ==
- What Happened Then? (1934) .... Minor role (uncredited)
- Can You Hear Me, Mother? (1935) .... Dolan
- Whom the Gods Love (1936) .... Langer
- Rembrandt (1936) .... Ludwick
- London Melody (1937) .... Policeman Outside Nightclub (uncredited)
- Knight Without Armour (1937) .... White Officer
- Dinner at the Ritz (1937) .... Gibout
- When We Are Married (1938, TV Movie) .... Councillor Albert Parker
- Let's Be Famous (1939) .... Singer in trio (uncredited)
- The Lion Has Wings (1939) .... Minor role (uncredited)
- Night Train to Munich (1940) .... Kampenfeldt
- Bulldog Sees It Through (1940) .... Tramp Steamer Officer
- Freedom Radio (1941) .... Rabenau
- The Ghost of St. Michael's (1941) .... Mr Humphries
- The Ghost Train (1941) .... John Price
- Inspector Hornleigh Goes To It (1941) .... Dr Kerbishley
- "Pimpernel" Smith (1941) .... Marx
- Once a Crook (1941) .... Prison Governor
- The Day Will Dawn (1942) .... Norwegian Under-Secretary (scenes deleted)
- The New Lot (1943, Short) .... Barrington (uncredited)
- When We Are Married (1943) .... Albert Parker
- The Way Ahead (1944) .... Pte Herbert Davenport
- They Came to a City (1944) .... Malcolm Stritton
- I See a Dark Stranger (1946) .... J. Miller
- School for Secrets (1946) .... Prof Laxton-Jones
- So Evil My Love (1948) .... Henry Courtney
- Men of Darkness (1948, TV Movie) .... Pisancon
- Broken Journey (1948) .... Edward Marshall
- Mr. Perrin and Mr. Traill (1948) .... Moy-Thompson
- It's Hard to Be Good (1948) .... Williams
- Passport to Pimlico (1949) .... Mr Wix
- The Late Edwina Black (1949, TV Movie) .... Henry Martin
- Trio (1950) .... Mr Henry Chester (segment "Sanatorium")
- The Long Dark Hall (1951) .... Chief Insp Sullivan
- I'll Never Forget You (1951) .... Mr Throstle
- Mr. Denning Drives North (1951) .... Wright
- When We Are Married (1951, TV movie) .... Councillor Albert Parker
- The Last Page (1952) .... Clive Oliver
- Laxdale Hall (1953) .... Samuel Pettigrew, MP
- Glad Tidings (1953) .... Tom Forester
- Meet Mr Lucifer (1953) .... Patterson
- Hobson's Choice (1954) .... Nathaniel Beenstock
- Orders Are Orders (1954) .... Colonel Bellamy
- The Teckman Mystery (1954) .... Maurice Miller
- Aunt Clara (1954) .... Rev Maurice Hilton
- The Unguarded Hour (1955, TV Movie) .... Colonel William Mason
- The Prisoner (1955) .... The General
- The Constant Husband (1955) .... The Boss
- The Dam Busters (1955) .... Official, National Physical Laboratory
- Doctor at Sea (1955) .... Capt Beamish
- Geordie (1955) .... Olympic Selector
- The Last Man to Hang (1956) .... Attorney-General
- The Green Man (1956) .... Sir Gregory Upshott
- Town on Trial (1957) .... Dr Reese
- Brothers in Law (1957) .... Tatlock QC
- Jessica (1957, TV Movie) .... Stanley Baines
- Dial 999 (TV series) (1958)....Myners
- Next to No Time (1958) .... Forbes, Factory Supervisor
- Room at the Top (1959) .... Mr Hoylake
- Carlton-Browne of the F.O. (1959) .... Foreign Secretary Tufton Slade
- Innocent Meeting (1959) .... Harold
- The Mummy (1959) .... Joseph Whemple
- I'm All Right Jack (1959) .... Magistrate
- Our Man in Havana (1959) .... General
- Bottoms Up (1960) .... Garrick-Jones
- Breathless (1960) .... A Journalist (uncredited)
- Follow That Horse! (1960) .... Special Branch Chief
- Make Mine Mink (1960) .... Inspector Pape
- A French Mistress (1960) .... Rev Edwin Peake
- Sands of the Desert (1960) .... Bossom
- Suspect (1960) .... Sir George Gatting, Minister of Defence
- The Pure Hell of St Trinian's (1960) .... Judge
- Line of Enquiry (1961, TV Movie) .... Mr Sinclair
- Only Two Can Play (1962) .... Vernon
- Crooks Anonymous (1962) .... Wagstaffe
- Waltz of the Toreadors (1962) .... Ackroyd, Court President
- On the Beat (1962) .... Sir Ronald Ackroyd
- Nurse on Wheels (1963) .... Vicar
- The Yellow Teddy Bears (1963) .... Harry Halburton
- Father Came Too! (1964) .... Mr Wedgewood
- The Black Torment (1964) .... Colonel John Wentworth
- Rotten to the Core (1965) .... Prison Governor (uncredited)
- The Great St. Trinian's Train Robbery (1966) .... Sir Horace, the Minister
- Hot Millions (1968) .... Bayswater (uncredited)
- Hostile Witness (1968) .... John Naylor
- The Adding Machine (1969) .... Smithers
- Arthur! Arthur! (1969) .... George Payne
- Destiny of a Spy (1969, TV Movie) .... Supt Pode
- Young Winston (1972) .... Old Officer (scenes deleted)
- That's Your Funeral (1972) .... Emmanuel Holroyd
- Symptoms (1974) .... Burke
- A Voyage Round My Father (1982, TV Movie) .... Judge
- Sleepwalker (1984) .... Old Englishman (final film role)
