= Geoffrey Lumsden =

British actor (1914–1984)

Geoffrey Lumsden as Captain Square in Dad's Army

Geoffrey Forbes Lumsden (26 December 1914 – 4 March 1984) was a British character actor who had a lengthy career on television. He often played pompous upper-class characters, army officers and the like.

== Biography ==
Lumsden was born in London in 1914, the son of Alfred Forbes Lumsden, and attended Repton School, where he was a contemporary of Denton Welch. By the time he had left school, both his parents had died. While living with his uncle he reluctantly trained as an engineer at a colliery. It was at the colliery that he first became interested in acting when he organised concerts for the workforce, and won a scholarship to train at RADA while still working there.

In 1938, he married Judith Cope. Working in repertory theatre, his theatrical career was interrupted by World War II during which he served in Burma. Returning to the theatre after the war, he became a playwright and appeared on various TV shows and films. In 1947, he married Helen A. Syme at Cuckfield in Sussex.

On Broadway he appeared as Sir Francis Getliffe in The Affair at the Henry Miller Theatre (1962) and as Major Hugh Beresford Maitland in Hostile Witness at the Music Box Theatre (1966). He wrote and starred in the 1958 farce Caught Napping in the West End. It was later revived in 1978 starring Arthur Lowe, Bill Pertwee and Edward Evans.

His best known role was as Captain Square in Dad's Army, the pompous commander of the Eastgate platoon of the Home Guard, who is a rival of Captain Mainwaring. Other TV appearances included Rookery Nook, Upstairs, Downstairs, It Ain't Half Hot Mum, Edward & Mrs. Simpson and Jack the Ripper (where he played the editor of the Daily Telegraph), and two appearances in the BBC Television Shakespeare.

Lumsden died in Westminster Hospital, London in 1984, aged 69 from a coronary occlusion. His uncles were the first-class cricketers Oswald and William Lumsden.

== Selected screen credits ==
Year	Title	Role	Notes
1952	The Story of Robin Hood and His Merrie Men	Merrie Man #11	
1961	Man at the Carlton Tower	Stocker	
1965	Dateline Diamonds	Army Officer	
1965	The Night Caller	Col. Davy	
1967	Mrs Thursday	Commander Barraclough	'The Train from Dunrich House', Stapleford Park, episode
1968	A Dandy in Aspic	Ridley	
1968	Salt and Pepper	Foreign Secretary	
1968	Hostile Witness	Major Hugh Beresford Maitland	
1969–1971	The Mind of Mr. J.G. Reeder	Lord Rothbard	
1970	The Horror of Frankenstein	Instructor	
1973	Yellow Dog	Sir William Renfrew	
1980	Love in a Cold Climate	Sir Archibald Curtly	TV Mini-Series, 1 episode

== Selected stage credits ==
- The Iron Duchess by William Douglas Home (1957)
- Caught Napping by Geoffrey Lumsden (1959)
- Aunt Edwina by William Douglas Home (1959)
