= Peterculter =

Suburb of Aberdeen in Scotland

Coordinates: 57.09700°N 2.26570°W

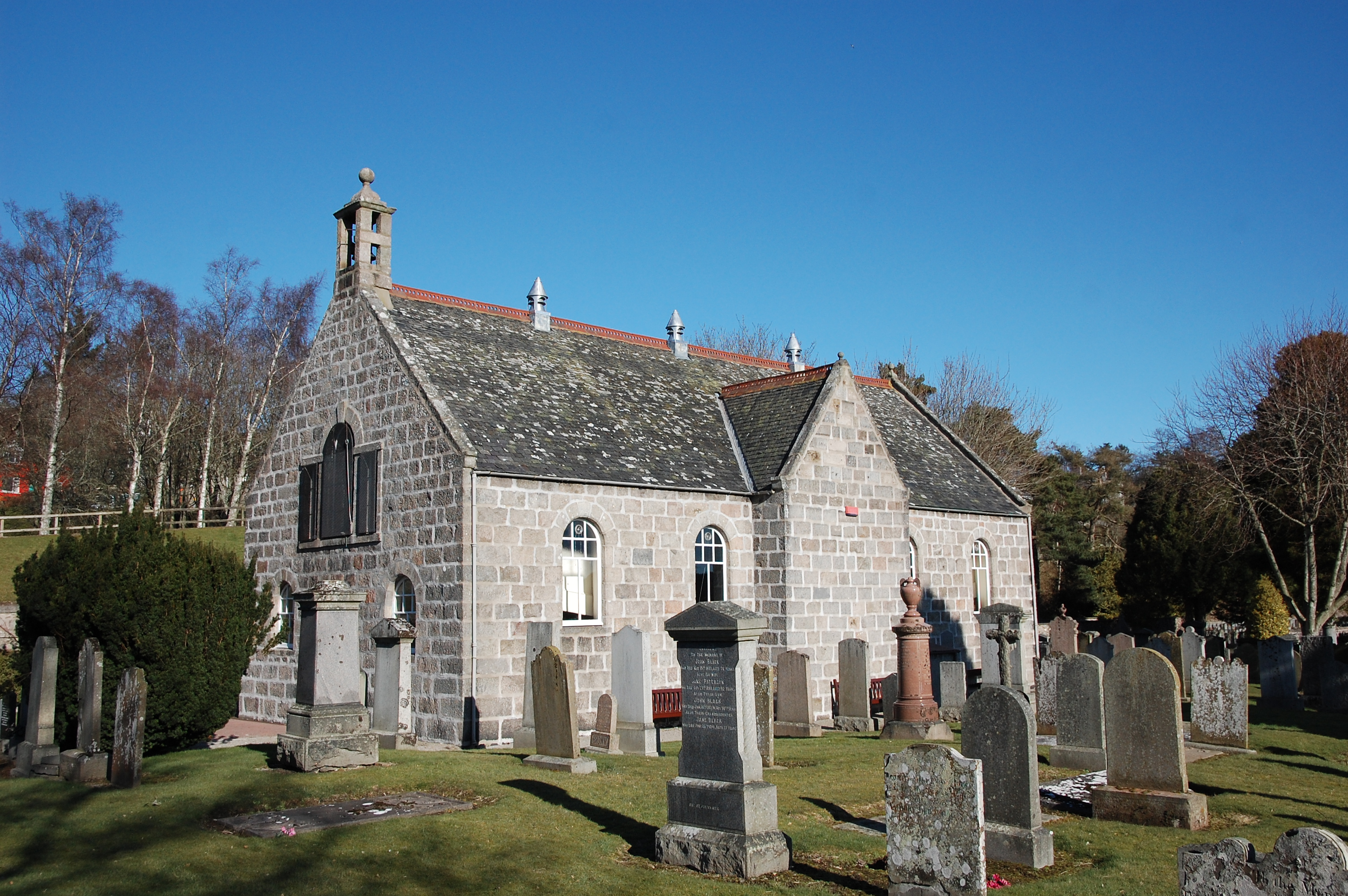
- Old St Peter's Kirk, Peterculter

- Location within the City of Aberdeen
- Population: 4,359
- OS grid reference: NJ840007
- Council area: Aberdeen
- Lieutenancy area: Aberdeen
- Country: Scotland
- Sovereign state: United Kingdom
- Post town: PETERCULTER
- Postcode district: AB14
- Dialling code: 01224
- Police: Scotland
- Fire: Scottish
- Ambulance: Scottish
- UK Parliament: Aberdeen South
- Scottish Parliament: Aberdeen South and North Kincardine
- Website: http://www.culter.net/

Peterculter /ˌpiːtərˈkuːtər/, also known as Culter, is an outer suburb of Aberdeen, Scotland, about eight miles (13 km) from the city centre. It lies on the north bank of the River Dee, at its confluence with the Culter Burn. Following the 1996 Scottish council boundary changes, it became part of the Lower Deeside ward in the Aberdeen City council area. As of the 2022 census, it had a population of 4,359.

== History ==
About one mile (2 km) south west of Peterculter is the site of the Roman marching camp at Normandykes.

King William the Lion bestowed the church of Kulter, "iuxta Abirdene", upon the Abbey and monks of St Mary of Kelso, about 1165–1199. The gift was afterwards confirmed by Mathew, Bishop of Aberdeen, within whose diocese the church sat.

Alan of Soltre, chaplain, who had probably been an ecclesiastic of the hospital, or monastery of Soutra, in Lothian, was presented by the Abbot of Kelso, to the vicarage of the church of Culter, 1239–1240.

In 1287–1288, an agreement was made between the Abbot and Convent of Kelso and the brotherhood of the Knights of Jerusalem, regarding the Templars' lands of Blairs and Kincolsi (Kincousie, now Kincaussie), on the south side of the Dee, by which a chapel, built by the Templars at their house of Culter, was recognised as a church, with parochial rights, for the inhabitants of the said lands. It was this agreement that changed the existing parish of Culter into two separate parishes with two separate names, the other being Maryculter.

== Attractions ==
Statue of Rob Roy

High on the steep bank of the Culter Burn, near the western edge of the settlement, stands a kilted figure holding a broadsword and targe, representing Rob Roy MacGregor. According to local tradition, Rob Roy is said to have leapt across the burn at this point while fleeing Hanoverian troops, although the story is unlikely to have a firm historical basis and may instead relate to the outlaw Gilderoy. The original statue is thought to have been adapted from a ship’s figurehead, and was replaced in 2017 by a resin effigy wearing ancient MacGregor tartan.

Due to its nearness to Aberdeen City and being only about thirty miles (50 km) from the Cairngorm National Park , Culter is a base for tourists. In the town itself there are choices of many local walks, including its connection to the Deeside Way at the site of the former Culter railway station, as well as the forest area known locally as "Sandy Hilly", or "The Muggie Widds" (St. Margaret Woods), the entrance to which sits beside the Bucklerburn region.

For sport, there is Peterculter Golf Club and Culter Sports Centre. Each year, on the last Saturday in May, is the Culter Gala, in the main playing field of the town; this event draws hundreds of local townsfolk.

== Education ==
Culter School is a primary school in Peterculter dating from 1896.

== Notable people ==
- Alexander Cuming, explorer
- William Duff, minister and psychologist
- Oswald Lumsden, cricketer
- William Lumsden, cricketer
- John Mortimer, cricketer
- Peter Donald Thomson, moderator of the Church of Scotland

== See also ==
- Crathes Castle
- Drum Castle
- Maryculter House
- Muchalls Castle
