= Colin Smith (Scottish cricketer) =

Scottish cricketer (born 1972)

Personal information
- Full name: Colin John Ogilvie Smith
- Born: 27 September 1972 (age 54); Aberdeen, Aberdeenshire, Scotland
- Height: 6 ft 5 in (1.96 m)
- Batting: Right-handed
- Role: Wicket-keeper
- Relatives: John Mortimer (grandfather)

International information
- National side: Scotland
- ODI debut (cap 20): 27 June 2006 v Pakistan
- Last ODI: 19 April 2009 v Afghanistan

Domestic team information
- Years: Team
- 1999–2009: Scotland

Career statistics
Competition	ODI	T20I	FC	LA
Matches	27	8	10	116
Runs scored	432	58	380	2,060
Batting average	19.63	11.60	25.33	21.02
100s/50s	0/2	0/0	0/3	0/10
Top score	59	46*	93	86*
Catches/stumpings	21/11	5/4	27/4	103/31
- Source: CricketArchive, 13 June 2009

Colin John Ogilvie Smith (born 27 September 1972) is a Scottish cricket player. He is a right-handed batsman and a wicket-keeper.

He made his début for the Scottish cricket team against Surrey on 23 June 1999 and has played for Scotland 119 times in all. This includes three One Day Internationals, his first coming against Pakistan in June 2006. He has also played for Sussex and Warwickshire at second XI level.

Smith is a police officer away from cricket, affectionately known as 'The Big C' he presently works within the Police Scotland "A" Division Divisional Co-ordination Unit alongside one time Shropshire cricketer John Hampson under the command of Andrew Bradnock. This has interfered with his cricket career on occasion. For example, during the 2005 ICC Trophy he missed the semi-final match against Bermuda as he was required for duty during the 31st G8 summit in Scotland.

Smith scored his maiden One Day International half-century against Australia in Scotland's opening game of the 2007 Cricket World Cup, but Scotland still lost by 203 runs.

On 24 June 2009, Smith announced his retirement from international cricket. He finished with 3763 runs with 20 fifties at an average of 23.67 for Scotland. He was then Scotland's most capped wicketkeeper.

Smith and business partner Neil MacRae are owners of "Legends" cricket equipment company which designed and distributes the "Katchet". The Katchet is a fielding aid which mirrors random deflections encountered when the ball deviates after hitting the bat or wicket. His grandfather, John Mortimer, also played first-class cricket for Scotland.
