= August 2008 in sports =

<<	August 2008					>>
Su	Mo	Tu	We	Th	Fr	Sa
					1	2
3	4	5	6	7	8	9
10	11	12	13	14	15	16
17	18	19	20	21	22	23
24	25	26	27	28	29	30
31
Sports

This list shows notable sports-related deaths, events, and notable outcomes that occurred in August of 2008.

== Deaths ==
- 3: Skip Caray
- 4: Craig Jones
- 7: Ralph Klein
- 8: Orville Moody
- 18: Genuine Risk
- 20: Gene Upshaw
- 28: Phil Hill

== Current sporting seasons ==
- Australian rules football:
  - AFL
- Auto racing 2008:
  - Formula 1
  - Sprint Cup
  - Nationwide
  - Craftsman Truck
  - World Rally Championship
  - IndyCar Series
  - American Le Mans
  - GP2
  - Le Mans Series
  - Rolex Sports Car
  - FIA GT
  - WTCC
  - V8 Supercar
  - Superleague Formula
- Baseball 2008:
  - Nippon Professional Baseball
  - Major League Baseball
- Basketball 2008:
  - NCAA (Philippines)
  - University Athletic Association of the Philippines
  - Women's National Basketball Association
- Canadian football:
  - Canadian Football League
- Cycling
  - UCI ProTour
- Football (soccer) 2007–08:
  - Argentina
  - Ecuador
- Football (soccer) 2008:
  - Brazil
  - Japan
  - MLS
  - Norway
- Football (soccer) 2008–09:
  - England
  - Germany
  - Italy
  - Spain
  - France
  - UEFA Champions League
  - UEFA Cup
- Golf 2008:
  - PGA Tour
  - European Tour
  - LPGA Tour
- Lacrosse 2008
  - National Lacrosse League
- Motorcycle racing 2008:
  - Moto GP
  - Superbike
- Rugby league
  - Super League
  - NRL
- Rugby union 2007–08:
  - Currie Cup

== 31 August 2008 (Sunday) ==
- Auto racing:
  - World Rally Championship:
    - Rally New Zealand in Taupō, New Zealand
      - (1) Sébastien Loeb (France) (2) Dani Sordo (Spain) (3) Mikko Hirvonen (Finland)
  - World Touring Car Championship season: Motorsport Arena Oschersleben at Oschersleben, Germany
    - Race 1: (1) Augusto Farfus (Brazil) (2) Robert Huff (United Kingdom) (3) Alain Menu (Switzerland)
    - Race 2: (1) Félix Porteiro (Spain) (2) Tom Coronel (Netherlands) (3) Robert Huff (United Kingdom)
  - Deutsche Tourenwagen Masters: Round 8 at Brands Hatch, Kent, United Kingdom
    - (1) Timo Scheider (Germany) (2) Paul di Resta (United Kingdom) (3) Mattias Ekström (Sweden)
  - IndyCar:
    - Detroit Indy Grand Prix at Belle Isle Park, Detroit, Michigan, United States:
      - (1) Justin Wilson (United Kingdom) (2) Hélio Castroneves (Brazil) (3) Tony Kanaan (Brazil)
  - NASCAR Sprint Cup:
    - Pepsi 500 at Auto Club Speedway in Fontana, California, United States
      - (1) Jimmie Johnson (California) (2) Greg Biffle (Washington (state)) (3) Denny Hamlin (Virginia)
        - Johnson not only wins, but becomes one of three drivers to clinch spots in the Chase for the Sprint Cup. Johnson, Dale Earnhardt Jr. and Jeff Burton will join Kyle Busch and Carl Edwards in the Chase. Biffle and Kevin Harvick effectively clinch spots in the Chase; both need only to start in next week's race at Richmond to make the Chase.
- Cricket
  - South African cricket team in England in 2008
    - 4th ODI:England 137/3 (17.4/20 ov) beat South Africa 183/6 (32.1 ov) by 7 wickets(D/L)
- Motorcycle racing:
  - Moto GP:
    - San Marino and Rimini's Coast motorcycle Grand Prix at Misano World Circuit, Misano Adriatico, Italy:
      - (1) Valentino Rossi (Italy) (2) Jorge Lorenzo (Spain) (3) Toni Elías (Spain)

== 30 August 2008 (Saturday) ==
- Cricket:
  - Bangladesh cricket team in Australia in 2008
    - 1st ODI:Australia 254/8 (50 ov) beat Bangladesh 74 (27.4 ov) by 180 runs
- Rugby union:
  - Tri Nations Series:
    - South Africa 53–8 Australia at Johannesburg
      - The Boks score their biggest win ever over the Wallabies. Jongi Nokwe becomes the first Springbok to score four tries against the Wallabies. Immediately after the match, Percy Montgomery, the all-time caps and points leader for South Africa, announces his retirement from international rugby.

== 28 August 2008 (Thursday) ==
- American football:
  - After having been suspended by the NFL for the 2007 season, Dallas Cowboys cornerback Adam Jones is fully reinstated for the upcoming season. (ESPN.com)
- Tennis:
  - US Open in New York City:
    - Ana Ivanovic (Serbia) , the #1-ranked woman and top seed, becomes the first top seed in the open era to lose in the second round of the US Open, losing 6–3, 4–6, 6–3 to #188 Julie Coin (France) .

== 24 August 2008 (Sunday) ==
- American football:
  - The New York Giants announce that defensive end Osi Umenyiora will miss the 2008 season with a knee injury. (AP via Yahoo)
- Auto racing:
  - Formula One:
    - European Grand Prix at the Valencia Street Circuit, Valencia, Spain:
      - (1) Felipe Massa (Brazil) (2) Lewis Hamilton (United Kingdom) (3) Robert Kubica (Poland)
  - IndyCar:
    - Peak Antifreeze & Motor Oil Indy Grand Prix at Infineon Raceway, Sonoma, California, United States:
      - (1) Hélio Castroneves (Brazil) (2) Ryan Briscoe (Australia) (3) Tony Kanaan (Brazil)
  - FIA GT Championship:
    - Bucharest 2 Hours, at Bucharest Ring, Bucharest, Romania:
      - (1) Jean-Denis Délétraz (Switzerland) & Marcel Fässler (Switzerland) (2) Mike Hezemans (Netherlands) & Fabrizio Gollin (Italy) (3) Andrea Bertolini (Italy) & Michael Bartels (Germany)
- Baseball:
  - 2008 Little League World Series:
    - (Hawaii) Waipahu, Hawaiʻi 12, Matamoros, Mexico 3
- 2008 Summer Olympics in Beijing
  - Athletics
    - Men's Marathon
      - (Kenya) Samuel Kamau Wanjiru 2:06:32, (Morocco) Jaouad Gharib 2:07:16, (Ethiopia) Tsegay Kebede 2:10:00
  - The olympics officially close with the conclusion of the closing ceremony.

== 23 August 2008 (Saturday) ==
- 2008 Summer Olympics in Beijing, China
  - Athletics
    - Men's 4x400 metre relay
      - (United States) (LaShawn Merritt, Angelo Taylor, David Neville, Jeremy Wariner) 2:55.39, (The Bahamas) (Andretti Bain, Michael Mathieu, Andrae Williams, Chris Brown) 2:58.03, (Russia) (Maksim Dyldin, Vladislav Frolov, Anton Kokorin, Denis Alexeev) 2:58.06
    - Men's 800 metres
      - (Kenya) Wilfred Bungei 1:44.65, (Sudan) Ismail Ahmed Ismail 1:44.70, (Kenya) Alfred Kirwa Yego 1:44.82
    - Men's 5000 metres
      - (Ethiopia) Kenenisa Bekele 12:57.82, (Kenya) Eliud Kipchoge 13:02.80, (Kenya) Edwin Cheruiyot Soi 13:06.22
    - Men's javelin throw
      - (Norway) Andreas Thorkildsen 90.57 m, (Latvia) Ainārs Kovals 86.64 m, (Finland) Tero Pitkämäki 86.16
    - Women's 4x400 metre relay
      - (United States) (Mary Wineberg, Allyson Felix, Monique Henderson, Sanya Richards) 3:18.54, (Russia) (Yulia Gushchina, Lyudmila Litvinova, Tatyana Firova, Anastasiya Kapachinskaya) 3:18.82, (Jamaica) (Novelene Williams, Shereefa Lloyd, Rosemarie Whyte, Shericka Williams) 3:20.40
    - Women's 1500 metres
      - (Kenya) Nancy Lagat 4:00.23, (Ukraine) Iryna Lishchynska 4:01.63, (Ukraine) Nataliya Tobias 4:01.78
    - Women's high jump
      - (Belgium) Tia Hellebaut 2.05 m, (Croatia) Blanka Vlašić 2.05 m, (Russia) Anna Chicherova 2.03 m
- Auto racing:
  - NASCAR Sprint Cup:
    - Sharpie 500 at Bristol Motor Speedway in Bristol, Tennessee, United States
      - (1) Carl Edwards (Missouri) (2) Kyle Busch (Nevada) (3) Denny Hamlin (Virginia)
- Rugby union:
  - Tri Nations Series:
    - South Africa 15–27 Australia at Durban

== 22 August 2008 (Friday) ==
- 2008 Summer Olympics in Beijing, China
  - Athletics
    - Men's 4x100 metre relay
      - (Jamaica) (Nesta Carter, Michael Frater, Usain Bolt, Asafa Powell) 37.10, (Trinidad and Tobago) (Keston Bledman, Marc Burns, Emmanuel Callender, Richard Thompson) 38.06, (Japan) (Naoki Tsukahara, Shingo Suetsugu, Shinji Takahira, Nobuharu Asahara) 38.15
    - Men's 50 kilometre walk
      - (Italy) Alex Schwazer 3:37:09, (Australia) Jared Tallent 3:39:27, (Russia) Denis Nizhegorodov 3:40:14
    - Men's decathlon
      - (United States) Bryan Clay 8791, (Belarus) Andrei Krauchanka 8551, (Cuba) Leonel Suárez 8527
    - Men's pole vault
      - (Australia) Steven Hooker 5.96 m, (Russia) Yevgeny Lukyanenko 5.85 m, (Ukraine) Denys Yurchenko 5.70 m
    - Women's 4x100 metre relay
      - (Russia) (Evgeniya Polyakova, Aleksandra Fedoriva, Yulia Gushchina, Yuliya Chermoshanskaya) 42.31, (Belgium) (Olivia Borlée, Hanna Mariën, Élodie Ouédraogo, Kim Gevaert) 42.54, (Nigeria) (Franca Idoko, Gloria Kemasuode, Halimat Ismaila, Oludamola Osayomi) 43.04
    - Women's 5000 metres
      - (Ethiopia) Tirunesh Dibaba 15:41.40, (Turkey) Elvan Abeylegesse 15:42.74, (Ethiopia) Meseret Defar 15:44.12
    - Women's long jump
      - (Brazil) Maurren Higa Maggi 7.04 m, (Russia) Tatyana Lebedeva 7.03 m, (Nigeria) Blessing Okagbare 6.01 m

== 21 August 2008 (Thursday) ==
- 2008 Summer Olympics in Beijing, China
  - Athletics
    - Men's 110 metre hurdles
      - (Cuba) Dayron Robles 12.93, (United States) David Payne 13.17, (United States) David Oliver 13.18
    - Men's 400 metres
      - (United States) LaShawn Merritt 43.75, (United States) Jeremy Wariner 44.74, (United States) David Neville 44.80
    - Men's triple jump
      - (Portugal) Nelson Évora 17.67 m, (United Kingdom) Phillips Idowu 17.62 m, (The Bahamas) Leevan Sands 17.59 m
    - Women's 20 kilometre walk
      - (Russia) Olga Kaniskina 1:26:31, (Norway) Kjersti Plätzer 1:27:07, (Italy) Elisa Rigaudo 1:27:12
    - Women's 200 metres
      - (Jamaica) Veronica Campbell-Brown 21.74, (United States) Allyson Felix 21.93, (Jamaica) Kerron Stewart 22.00
    - Women's javelin throw
      - (Czech Republic) Barbora Špotáková 71.42 m, (Russia) Mariya Abakumova 70.78 m, (Germany) Christina Obergföll 66.13 m
- Cricket
  - 2008 Associates Tri-Series in Canada
    - West Indies 159/4 (39.5 ov) beat Bermuda 158/9 (50 ov) by 6 wickets

== 20 August 2008 (Wednesday) ==
- 2008 Summer Olympics in Beijing, China
  - Athletics
    - Men's 200 metres
      - (Jamaica) Usain Bolt 19.30, (United States) Shawn Crawford 19.96, (United States) Walter Dix 19.98
        - Usain Bolt sets a new world record in men's 200 metres.
    - Women's 400 metre hurdles
      - (Jamaica) Melaine Walker 52.64, (United States) Sheena Tosta 53.70, (United Kingdom) Tasha Danvers 53.84
    - Women's hammer throw
      - (Belarus) Aksana Miankova 76.34 m, (Cuba) Yipsi Moreno 75.20 m, (China) Zhang Wenxiu 74.32 m
  - Basketball:
    - Olympic men's tournament: Qualifying teams to the semifinals in bold.
      - **Spain** 72–59 Croatia
      - **Lithuania** 94–68 China
      - **United States** 116–85 Australia
      - **Argentina** 80–78 Greece
- Basketball
  - PBA Fiesta Conference Finals:
    - Barangay Ginebra Kings 97, Air21 Express 84, **Ginebra wins series, 4–3.**
- American football: National Football League
  - Gene Upshaw, a hall-of-fame guard and the long-time Executive Director of the National Football League Players Association, dies of pancreatic cancer at the age of 63. He was diagnosed just on August 17.
- Cricket
  - Indian cricket team in Sri Lanka in 2008
    - India 143/7 (39.4 ov) beat Sri Lanka 142 (38.3 ov) by 3 wickets

== 19 August 2008 (Tuesday) ==
- 2008 Summer Olympics
  - Athletics
    - Men's 1500 metres
      - (Bahrain) Rashid Ramzi 3:32.94, (Kenya) Asbel Kipruto Kiprop 3:33.11, (New Zealand) Nicholas Willis 3:34.16
    - Men's discus throw
      - (Estonia) Gerd Kanter 68.82 m, (Poland) Piotr Małachowski 67.82 m, (Lithuania) Virgilijus Alekna 67.79 m
    - Men's high jump
      - (Russia) Andrey Silnov 2.36 m, (United Kingdom) Germaine Mason 2.34 m, (Russia) Yaroslav Rybakov 2.34 m
    - Women's 100 metre hurdles
      - (United States) Dawn Harper 12.54, (Australia) Sally McLellan 12.64, (Canada) Priscilla Lopes-Schliep 12.64
    - Women's 400 metres
      - (United Kingdom) Christine Ohuruogu 49.62, (Jamaica) Shericka Williams 49.69, (United States) Sanya Richards 49.93
  - Basketball
    - Women's tournament: Qualifying teams to the semifinals in bold.
      - **China** 77–62 Belarus
      - **Australia** 79–46 Czech Republic
      - **United States** 104–60 South Korea
      - Mali 65–84 **Spain**

== 18 August 2008 (Monday) ==
- 2008 Summer Olympics in Beijing, China
  - Athletics
    - Men's 400 metre hurdles
      - (United States) Angelo Taylor 47.25, (United States) Kerron Clement 47.98, (United States) Bershawn Jackson 48.06
    - Men's 3000 metre steeplechase
      - (Kenya) Brimin Kiprop Kipruto 8:10.34, (France) Mahiedine Mekhissi-Benabbad 8:10.49, (Kenya) Richard Kipkemboi Mateelong 8:11.01
    - Men's long jump
      - (Panama) Irving Saladino 8.34 m, (South Africa) Khotso Mokoena 8.24 m, (Cuba) Ibrahim Camejo 8.20 m
    - Women's 800 metres
      - (Kenya) Pamela Jelimo 1:54.87, (Kenya) Janeth Jepkosgei 1:56.07, (Morocco) Hasna Benhassi 1:56.73
    - Women's discus throw
      - (United States) Stephanie Brown-Trafton 64.74 m, (Cuba) Yarelis Barrios 63.64 m, (Ukraine) Olena Antonova 62.59 m
    - Women's pole vault
      - (Russia) Yelena Isinbayeva 5.05 m, (United States) Jennifer Stuczynski 4.80 m, (Russia) Svetlana Feofanova 4.75 m
        - Yelena Isinbayeva sets a new world record in women's pole vault.
  - Basketball
    - Men's tournament:
      - Group A: Iran 57–91 Croatia
      - Group A: Australia 106–65 Lithuania
      - Group A: Argentina 91–79 Russia
      - Group B: Greece 91–77 China
      - Group B: Angola 50–98 Spain
      - Group B: United States 106–57 Germany
- Cricket:
  - Indian cricket team in Sri Lanka in 2008
    - 1st ODI:Sri Lanka 147/2 (34.5 ov) beat India 146 (46 ov) by 8 wickets
  - English cricket team in Scotland in 2008
    - Only ODI:Scotland 156/9 (44/50 ov) vs England 10/0 (2.3/44 ov)-No result.
  - 2008 Associates Tri-Series in Canada
    - Canada 260/7 (50 ov) beat Bermuda 235/8 (50 ov) by 25 runs

== 17 August 2008 (Sunday) ==
- 2008 Summer Olympics in Beijing, China
  - Athletics
    - Men's Hammer Throw
      - (Slovenia) Primož Kozmus 82.02 m, (Belarus) Vadim Devyatovskiy 81.61 m, (Belarus) Ivan Tsikhan 81.51 m.
    - Men's 10000 metres
      - (Ethiopia) Kenenisa Bekele 27:01.17, (Ethiopia) Sileshi Sihine 27:02.77, (Kenya) Micah Kogo 27:04.11
    - Women's 100 metres
      - (Jamaica) Shelly-Ann Fraser 10.78, (Jamaica) Sherone Simpson 10.98, (Jamaica) Kerron Stewart 10.98.
    - Women's 3000 metre steeplechase
      - (Russia) Gulnara Samitova-Galkina 8:51.8, (Kenya) Eunice Jepkorir 9:07.41, (Russia) Yekaterina Volkova 9:07.64
        - Gulnara Samitova-Galkina sets a new world record in women's 3000 metre steeplechase.
    - Women's Marathon
      - (Romania) Constantina Diṭă-Tomescu 2:26:44, (Kenya) Catherine Ndereba 2:27:06, (China) Chunxiu Zhou 2:27:07
    - Women's Triple Jump
      - (Cameroon) Françoise Mbango Etone 15.39 m, (Russia) Tatyana Lebedeva 15.32 m, (Greece) Hrysopiyí Devetzí 15.23 m
        - Françoise Mbango Etone sets a new olympic record in women's triple jump.
  - Basketball
    - Women's tournament: Qualifying teams to the knockout stage in bold.
      - Group A: Australia 75–55 **Russia**
      - Group A: **South Korea** 72–68 Latvia
      - Group A: Brazil 68–53 Belarus
      - Group B: Mali 47–79 Spain
      - Group B: China 79–63 Czech Republic
      - Group B: New Zealand 60–96 United States
- Auto racing:
  - NASCAR Sprint Cup:
    - 3M Performance 400 at Michigan International Speedway in Brooklyn, Michigan, United States
      - (1) Carl Edwards (Missouri) (2) Kyle Busch (Nevada) (3) David Ragan (Georgia (U.S. state))
  - World Rally Championship:
    - Rallye Deutschland in Trier, Germany
      - (1) Sébastien Loeb (France) (2) Dani Sordo (Spain) (3) François Duval (Belgium)
- Motorcycle racing:
  - Moto GP:
    - Czech Republic motorcycle Grand Prix at Masaryk Circuit, Brno, Czech Republic:
      - (1) Valentino Rossi (Italy) (2) Toni Elías (Spain) (3) Loris Capirossi (Italy)

== 16 August 2008 (Saturday) ==
- 2008 Summer Olympics in Beijing, China
  - Athletics
    - Men's 20 kilometre walk
      - (Russia) Valeriy Borchin 1:19:01, (Ecuador) Jefferson Pérez 1:19:15, (Australia) Jared Tallent 1:19:42.
    - Men's 100 metres
      - (Jamaica) Usain Bolt 9.69, (Trinidad and Tobago) Richard Thompson 9.89, (United States) Walter Dix 9.91
        - Usain Bolt sets a new 100m world record.
    - Women's Heptathlon
      - (Ukraine) Nataliya Dobrynska 6733, (United States) Hyleas Fountain 6619, (Russia) Tatyana Chernova 6591.
    - Women's shot put
      - (New Zealand) Valerie Vili 20.56 m, (Belarus) Natallia Mikhnevich 20.28 m, (Belarus) Nadzeya Astapchuk 19.86 m.
  - Badminton
    - Men's doubles
      - Semifinals
        - (Indonesia) Markis Kido/ (Indonesia) Hendra Setiawan def (Denmark) Lars Paaske/ (Denmark) Jonas Rasmussen 21–19, 21–17
        - (China) Fu Haifeng/ (China) Cai Yun def (South Korea) Lee Jae-jin/ (South Korea) Hwang Ji-man 22–20, 21–8
      - Finals
        - (Indonesia) Markis Kido/ (Indonesia) Hendra Setiawan def (China) Fu Haifeng/ (China) Cai Yun 12–21, 21–11, 21–16
      - 3rd Place
        - (South Korea) Lee Jae-jin/ (South Korea) Hwang Ji-man def (Denmark) Lars Paaske/ (Denmark) Jonas Rasmussen 13–21, 21–18, 21–17
    - Women's Singles
      - Semifinals
        - (China) Xie Xingfang def (China) Lu Lan 7–21, 21–10, 21–12
        - (China) Zhang Ning def (Indonesia) Maria Kristin Yulianti 21–15, 21–15
      - Finals
        - (China) Zhang Ning def (China) Xie Xingfang 21–12, 10–21, 21–18
      - 3rd Place
        - (Indonesia) Maria Kristin Yulianti def (China) Lu Lan 11–21, 21–13, 21–15
  - Basketball
    - Men's tournament: Qualifying teams to the knockout stage in bold.
      - Group A: Russia 80–95 **Australia**
      - Group A: **Croatia** 76–86 Lithuania
      - Group A: Iran 82–97 **Argentina**
      - Group B: **Greece** 102–61 Angola
      - Group B: China 59–55 Germany
      - Group B: **Spain** 82–119 United States
- Rugby union:
  - Tri Nations Series:
    - South Africa 0–19 New Zealand at Cape Town
      - Springbok Percy Montgomery became the ninth player to make his 100th international appearance.

== 15 August 2008 (Friday) ==
- 2008 Summer Olympics in Beijing, China
  - Archery
    - Men's Individual
      - Quarterfinals
        - Juan René Serrano (Mexico) 113–106 (United States) Vic Wunderle
        - Park Kyung-Mo (South Korea) 108(+19)–108(+17) (Cuba) Juan Carlos Stevens
        - Viktor Ruban (Ukraine) 115–106 (Japan) Moriya Ryuichi
        - Bair Badënov (Russia) 109–104 (Malaysia) Cheng Chu Sian
      - Semifinals
        - Park Kyung-Mo (South Korea) 115–112 (Mexico) Juan René Serrano
        - Viktor Ruban (Ukraine) 112(+20)–112(+18) (Russia) Bair Badënov
      - Finals
        - Viktor Ruban (Ukraine) 113–112 (South Korea) Park Kyung-Mo
      - 3rd Place
        - Bair Badënov (Russia) 115–110 (Mexico) Juan René Serrano
  - Athletics
    - Men's Shot Put
      - (Poland) Tomasz Majewski 21.51 m, (United States) Christian Cantwell 21.09 m, (Belarus) Andrei Mikhnevich 21.05 m.
    - Women's 10000 metres
      - (Ethiopia) Tirunesh Dibaba 29:54.66, (Turkey) Elvan Abeylegesse 29:56.34, (United States) Shalane Flanagan 30:22.22.
        - Tirunesh Dibaba sets a new Olympic record beating the previous record of 30:17.49.
  - Badminton
    - Women's doubles
      - Semifinals
        - (South Korea) Lee Kyung-won/ (South Korea) Lee Hyo-jung def. (Japan) Miyuki Maeda/ (Japan) Satoko Suetsuna 22–20, 21–15
        - (China) Du Jing/ (China) Yu Yang def. (China) Zhang Yawen/ (China) Wei Yili 21–19, 21–12
      - Finals
        - (China) Du Jing/ (China) Yu Yang def. (South Korea) Lee Kyung-won/ (South Korea) Lee Hyo-jung 21–15, 21–13
      - 3rd Place
        - (China) Zhang Yawen/ (China) Wei Yili def. (Japan) Miyuki Maeda/ (Japan) Satoko Suetsuna 21–17, 21–10
  - Basketball
    - Women's tournament: Qualifying teams to the knockout stage in bold.
      - Group A: Latvia 73–96 **Australia**
      - Group A: Russia 74–64 Brazil
      - Group A: South Korea 53–63 Belarus
      - Group B: Czech Republic 90–59 New Zealand
      - Group B: China 69–48 Mali
      - Group B: **United States** 93–55 Spain

== 14 August 2008 (Thursday) ==
- 2008 Summer Olympics in Beijing, China
  - Archery
    - Women's Individual
      - Quarterfinals
        - Park Sung-hyun (South Korea) 112–103 (Japan) Nami Hayakawa
        - Kwon Un Sil (North Korea) 105–99 (Mexico) Mariana Avitia
        - Zhang Juanjuan (China) 106–101 (South Korea) Joo Hyun-Jung
        - Yun Ok-Hee (South Korea) 111–105 (United States) Khatuna Lorig
      - Semifinals
        - Park Sung-hyun (South Korea) 109–106 (North Korea) Kwon Un Sil
        - Zhang Juanjuan (China) 115–109 (South Korea) Yun Ok-Hee
      - Finals
        - Zhang Juanjuan (China) 110–109 (South Korea) Park Sung-hyun
      - 3rd Place
        - Yun Ok-Hee (South Korea) 109–106 (North Korea) Kwon Un Sil
  - Basketball
    - Men's tournament: Qualifying teams to the knockout stage in bold.
      - Group A: Australia 106–68 Iran
      - Group A: **Lithuania** 86–79 Russia
      - Group A: Argentina 77–53 Croatia
      - Group B: Germany 55–72 Spain
      - Group B: Angola 68–85 China
      - Group B: **United States** 92–69 Greece

== 13 August 2008 (Wednesday) ==
- 2008 Summer Olympics in Beijing, China
  - Basketball – Olympics:
    - Women's tournament:
      - Group A: Belarus 65–71 Russia
      - Group A: Brazil 78–79 Latvia
      - Group A: Australia 90–62 South Korea
      - Group B: Spain 74–55 Czech Republic
      - Group B: China 80–63 New Zealand
      - Group B: Mali 41–97 United States

== 12 August 2008 (Tuesday) ==
- 2008 Summer Olympics in Beijing, China
  - Basketball
    - Men's tournament:
      - Group A: Iran 67–99 Lithuania
      - Group A: Croatia 85–78 Russia
      - Group A: Argentina 85–68 Australia
      - Group B: Greece 84–67 Germany
      - Group B: China 75–85 Spain (OT)
        - With Yao Ming fouling out and Spain's Ricky Rubio's pesky defense against the Chinese backcourt, the world champions survive the hosts in overtime.
      - Group B: Angola 76–97 United States

== 11 August 2008 (Monday) ==
- 2008 Summer Olympics in Beijing, China
  - Archery
    - Men's Team
      - Quarterfinals
        - South Korea 224–222 Poland
        - China 217–219 Russia
        - Italy 218–213 Malaysia
        - Ukraine 214–211 Chinese Taipei
      - Semifinals
        - South Korea 221–218 China
        - Italy 223–221 Ukraine
      - Finals
        - South Korea 227–225 Italy
      - 3rd Place
        - China 222–219 Ukraine
  - Basketball
    - Women's tournament:
      - Group A: New Zealand 62–85 Spain
      - Group A: Czech Republic 81–47 Mali
      - Group B: South Korea 72–77 Russia
      - Group B: Latvia 57–79 Belarus
      - Group B: China 63–108 United States
      - Group A: Australia 80–65 Brazil
- Cricket
  - Indian cricket team in Sri Lanka in 2008
    - 3rd Test:Sri Lanka 396 (134.2 ov) & 123/2 (23.1 ov) beat India 249 (80 ov) & 268 (87.5 ov) by 8 wickets
      - **Sri Lanka wins the three test series 2–1.**
  - South African cricket team in England in 2008
    - 4th Test:England 316 (95.2 ov) & 198/4 (52.5 ov) beat South Africa 194 (64.5 ov) & 318 (99.2 ov) by 6 wickets
      - **South Africa wins the four test series 2–1.**

== 10 August 2008 (Sunday) ==
- 2008 Summer Olympics in Beijing, China
  - Archery
    - Women's Team
      - Quarterfinals
        - South Korea 231–217 Italy
        - France 218–211 Poland
        - China 211–206 India
        - Great Britain (United Kingdom) 201–196 Japan
      - Semifinals
        - South Korea 213–184 France
        - China 208–202 (United Kingdom) Great Britain
      - Finals
        - South Korea 224–215 China
      - 3rd Place
        - France 203–201 (United Kingdom) Great Britain
  - Basketball
    - Men's tournament:
      - Group A: Russia 71–49 Iran
      - Group B: Germany 95–66 Angola
      - Group B: Spain 81–66 Greece
      - Group A: Lithuania 79–75 Argentina
        - Linas Kleiza's three-pointer with 2.1 seconds left clinched the victory for the Lithuanians.
      - Group A: Australia 82–97 Croatia
      - Group B: United States 101–70 China
- Auto racing:
  - NASCAR Sprint Cup:
    - Centurion Boats at the Glen at Watkins Glen International in Watkins Glen, New York, United States
      - (1) Kyle Busch (Nevada) (2) Tony Stewart (Indiana) (3) Marcos Ambrose (Australia)
        - Busch clinches the top seed for the Chase for the Sprint Cup with four races remaining before the Chase. He also becomes the first driver in NASCAR history to win three road course races in a single season (two in the Sprint Cup and one in the Nationwide Series).
- Golf:
  - PGA Tour and European Tour – PGA Championship in Bloomfield Hills, Michigan:
    - In the last major of the year, Pádraig Harrington (Republic of Ireland) shoots 4-under-par 66 to finish at 277 (−3), giving him a two-shot win over Ben Curtis (United States) and Sergio García (Spain) . The win gives Harrington his second consecutive major and third overall, and also makes him the first European to win the PGA Championship since 1930 and the first ever to win while residing outside the U.S.

== 9 August 2008 (Saturday) ==
- Auto racing:
  - IRL:
    - Meijer Indy 300 at Kentucky Speedway in Sparta, Kentucky:
      - (1) Scott Dixon (New Zealand) (2) Hélio Castroneves (Brazil) (3) Marco Andretti (United States)
- 2008 Summer Olympics in Beijing, China
  - Basketball
    - Women's tournament:
      - Group A: Belarus 64–83 Australia
      - Group B: Mali 72–76 New Zealand
      - Group B: China 67–64 Spain
      - Group A: South Korea 68–62 Brazil (OT)
      - Group B: Czech Republic 57–97 United States
      - Group A: Latvia 57–62 Russia
- Rugby union:
  - South Africa 63–9 Argentina in Johannesburg
    - In a one-off Test, part of ongoing celebrations of Nelson Mandela's 90th birthday, the Pumas take an early 9–0 lead, but the Boks take over from there, running in nine tries, seven in the second half. The second-half onslaught is paced by JP Pietersen and Joe van Niekerk with two tries each.

== 8 August 2008 (Friday) ==
- Cricket
  - Bermudian cricket team in the Netherlands in 2008
    - 1st ODI:Bermuda vs Netherlands-Match abandoned without a ball bowled.
- 2008 Summer Olympics in Beijing
  - The Olympics officially starts with the lighting of the Olympic torch.

== 7 August 2008 (Thursday) ==
- 2008 Summer Olympics in Beijing, China:
  - Football (soccer):
    - Men:
      - Group A: Australia 1–1 Serbia
      - Group A: Ivory Coast 1–2 Argentina
      - Group B: Japan 0–1 United States
      - Group B: Netherlands 0–0 Nigeria
      - Group C: Brazil 1–0 Belgium
      - Group C: China 1–1 New Zealand
      - Group D: Honduras 0–3 Italy
      - Group D: South Korea 1–1 Cameroon
- Lacrosse:
  - The sport's new unified governing body, the Federation of International Lacrosse (FIL), holds its first meeting. The FIL was formed by the merger of the former governing bodies for men's and women's lacrosse, respectively the International Lacrosse Federation and International Federation of Women's Lacrosse Associations.

== 6 August 2008 (Wednesday) ==
- 2008 Summer Olympics in Beijing, China:
  - Football (soccer):
    - Women:
      - Group E: Argentina 1–2 Canada
      - Group E: China 2–1 Sweden
      - Group F: Germany 0–0 Brazil
      - Group F: North Korea 1–0 Nigeria
      - Group G: Japan 2–2 New Zealand
      - Group G: Norway 2–0 United States
- American football:
  - Quarterback Brett Favre was traded from the Green Bay Packers to the New York Jets for a draft pick that will increase in value depending on the Jets' results in 2008. (Fox Sports (USA))

== 5 August 2008 (Tuesday) ==
- American football:
  - After several hours of closed-door talks on Monday, Brett Favre leaves the Green Bay Packers' training camp today, and Packers coach Mike McCarthy says at a news conference that Favre's future is not with the team. Reportedly, the Packers have rejected a trade to another NFC North team, but a source indicates that Favre may be open to a trade to the Tampa Bay Buccaneers. (ESPN)
- Cricket
  - 2009 ICC World Twenty20 Qualifier
    - 5th Place Final:Canada 71/2 (10.3 ov) beat Bermuda 70 (20 ov) by 8 wickets
    - 1st Place Final:Ireland vs Netherlands- Match abandoned with a toss. Ireland and the Netherlands share the trophy.

== 4 August 2008 (Monday) ==
- Cricket:
  - 2009 ICC World Twenty20 Qualifier
    - 1st Semifinal:Ireland 72/6 (19.1 ov) beat Kenya 67 (17.2 ov) by 4 wickets
    - 2nd Semifinal:Netherlands 110/5 (18 ov) beat Scotland 107/8 (20 ov) by 5 wickets
    - 3rd Place Final:Scotland 107/1 (18.1 ov) beat Kenya 106/9 (20 ov) by 9 wickets

== 3 August 2008 (Sunday) ==
- American football:
  - The National Football League officially reinstates Brett Favre, who will end his brief retirement when he reports to the Green Bay Packers' training camp Monday.
- Auto racing:
  - Formula One:
    - Hungarian Grand Prix at the Hungaroring, Mogyoród, Hungary:
      - (1) Heikki Kovalainen (Finland) (2) Timo Glock (Germany) (3) Kimi Räikkönen (Finland)
  - FIA GT Championship:
    - Spa 24 Hours, at Circuit de Spa-Francorchamps, Spa, Belgium:
      - (1) Andrea Bertolini (Italy) , Michael Bartels (Germany) , Stéphane Sarrazin (France) & Eric van de Poele (Belgium) (2) Alexandre Sarnes Negrão (Brazil) , Miguel Ramos (Portugal) , Stéphane Lemeret (Belgium) & Alessandro Pier Guidi (Italy) (3) Darren Turner (United Kingdom) , Allan Simonsen (Denmark) , Philipp Peter (Austria) & Andrew Thompson (United Kingdom)
  - NASCAR Sprint Cup:
    - Pennsylvania 500 at Pocono Raceway in Long Pond, Pennsylvania, United States
      - (1) Carl Edwards (Missouri) (2) Tony Stewart (Indiana) (3) Jimmie Johnson (California)
  - V8 Supercar:
    - Round 8 at Winton Motor Raceway in Benalla, Victoria, Australia
      - (1) Garth Tander (Australia) (2) Jamie Whincup (Australia) (3) Will Davison (Australia)
  - World Rally Championship:
    - Rally Finland in Jyväskylä, Finland
      - (1) Sébastien Loeb (France) (2) Mikko Hirvonen (Finland) (3) Chris Atkinson (Australia)
- Cricket:
  - India in Sri Lanka
    - 2nd Test:India 326 (82 ov) & 269 (76.2 ov) beat Sri Lanka 292 (93.3 ov) & 136 (47.3 ov) by 170 runs
      - India levels the 3-match series 1–1
  - 2009 ICC World Twenty20 Qualifier
    - Group A
      - Scotland 100/2 (17.4 ov) beat Bermuda 99/7 (20 ov) by 8 wickets
      - Ireland 43/7 (9/20 ov) beat Bermuda 41/8 (9/20 ov) by 4 runs (D/L)
        - Rain reduced match to 9 overs per side.
    - Group B
      - Kenya 92/6 (17.5 ov) beat Canada 91 (19.4 ov) by 4 wickets
    - Ireland, Kenya, Scotland, and the Netherlands qualify for the Semifinals. The two finalists automatically qualify for the 2009 ICC World Twenty20. The 3rd Place finisher may qualify if Zimbabwe's withdrawal from the tournament is confirmed.
- Golf:
  - PGA Tour and European Tour: Bridgestone Invitational in Akron, Ohio, USA
    - Vijay Singh (Fiji) holds off Stuart Appleby (Australia) and Lee Westwood (England) to defeat both by one shot, winning his first World Golf Championships individual event. Singh's 32nd career PGA Tour win gives him the all-time record for PGA Tour wins by a player born outside the U.S., surpassing English-born American Harry Cooper.
  - LPGA: Women's British Open in Sunningdale, England
    - In the final major of the LPGA season, Jiyai Shin (South Korea) cruises to a three-shot win over Yani Tseng (Taiwan) . Shin becomes the third golfer this year to collect her first LPGA win in a major.
- Motorcycle racing:
  - Superbike:
    - Brands Hatch Superbike World Championship round at Brands Hatch, Kent, United Kingdom:
    - Race 1 (1) Ryuichi Kiyonari (Japan) (2) Troy Bayliss (Australia) (3) Max Biaggi (Italy)
    - Race 2 (1) Ryuichi Kiyonari (Japan) (2) Noriyuki Haga (Japan) (3) Troy Corser (Australia)
      - The meeting is marred by the death of 23-year-old British rider Craig Jones during the ninth round of the 2008 Supersport World Championship season.

== 2 August 2008 (Saturday) ==
- Cricket:
  - South Africa in England
    - 3rd Test:South Africa 314 (90.2 ov) & 283/5 (80 ov) beat England 231 (77 ov) & 363 (98.2 ov) by 5 wickets
      - South Africa lead 2–0 and secures victory in the 4-match series
  - 2009 ICC World Twenty20 Qualifier
    - Group A
      - Ireland 118/6 (19.5 ov) beat Scotland 117 (20 ov) by 4 wickets
    - Group B
      - Netherlands 153/5 (20 ov) beat Kenya 134/9 (20 ov) by 19 runs
      - Canada 98/6 (19.3 ov) beat Netherlands 97 (18.4 ov) by 4 wickets
- Rugby union:
  - Tri Nations Series:
    - New Zealand 39–10 Australia at Auckland
      - The All Blacks secure a bonus-point win against the Wallabies to level the Bledisloe Cup series at one win apiece.
