= 2008 English cricket season =

Cricket season in England

County Championship
- Champions: Durham
- Runners-up: Nottinghamshire
- Most runs: Murray Goodwin (1,343)
- Most wickets: James Tomlinson (67)

Friends Provident Trophy
- Champions: Essex Eagles
- Runners-up: Kent Spitfires
- Most runs: Martin van Jaarsveld (660)
- Most wickets: Yasir Arafat (24)

NatWest Pro40
- Champions: Sussex Sharks
- Runners-up: Hampshire Hawks
- Most runs: Marcus Trescothick (556)
- Most wickets: Jade Dernbach (24)

Twenty20 Cup
- Champions: Middlesex Crusaders
- Runners-up: Kent Spitfires
- Most runs: Joe Denly (451)
- Most wickets: Yasir Arafat (23)

PCA Player of the Year
- Martin van Jaarsveld

Wisden Cricketers of the Year
- James Anderson; Dale Benkenstein; Mark Boucher; Neil McKenzie; Claire Taylor

The 2008 English cricket season was the 109th in which the County Championship had been an official competition. Four regular tournaments were played: The LV County Championship (first-class), Friends Provident Trophy (50 Over), NatWest Pro40 League (40 Over) and the Twenty20 Cup (T20). All four tournaments featured the eighteen classic county cricket teams, although the Friends Provident Trophy also featured teams from Ireland and Scotland.

In the county championship, Durham won their first championship title by 8 points from Nottinghamshire. Kent and Surrey were the two teams to be relegated to Division Two, with Surrey failing to register a win for the first time since 1871. It completed a miserable season for Surrey, who also finished bottom of their Twenty20 Cup division and failed to progress from the group stage of the Friends Provident Trophy. Warwickshire and Worcestershire were the two teams promoted from Division Two.

In the other competitions, Essex won the Friend's Provident Trophy with a 5 wicket victory over Kent; Sussex claimed the Pro40 Division 1 title with a last ball six, leaving Hampshire runners up. Last year's champions Worcestershire had to beat Glamorgan in the play-off to retain their Division 1 status for next year, while Middlesex and Lancashire were relegated. Essex bounced back from relegation last season to win the Division 2 title and, with it, a place in the top division alongside runners-up Yorkshire. Middlesex won their first domestic title in 15 years in the Twenty20 Cup with a 3 run win over reigning champions Kent.

New Zealand toured England to compete in a test series which England won 2-0 and South Africa toured England to compete in a test series which South Africa won 2–1.

== Roll of honour ==
Test series

- England v New Zealand: 3 Tests - England won 2–0.
- England v South Africa: 4 Tests - South Africa won 2–1.

ODI series

- England v New Zealand: 5 ODI's - New Zealand won 3–1.
- England v South Africa: 5 ODI's - England won 4–0. (One match abandoned due to rain)
- England v Scotland: 1 ODI - Match abandoned because of rain.

Twenty20 Internationals

- England v New Zealand: 1 Twenty20 International - England won.
- England v South Africa: 1 Twenty20 International - Match abandoned because of rain.

County Championship

- Champions: Durham
- Division Two winners: Warwickshire

Friends Provident Trophy

- Winners: Essex - Runners-up: Kent

Pro40 (National League)

- Division One winners: Sussex
- Division Two winners: Essex

Twenty20 Cup

- Winners: Middlesex - Runners-up: Kent

Minor Counties Championship

- Winners: Berkshire - Runners-up: Lincolnshire

MCCA Knockout Trophy

- Winners: Devon - Runners-up: Berkshire

Second XI Championship

- Winners: Durham 2nd XI

Second XI Trophy

- Winners: Hampshire 2nd XI - Runners-up: Essex 2nd XI

== LV County Championship ==
=== Divisions ===
Division One	Division Two
Durham	Derbyshire
Hampshire	Essex
Kent	Glamorgan
Lancashire	Gloucestershire
Nottinghamshire	Leicestershire
Somerset	Middlesex
Surrey	Northamptonshire
Sussex	Warwickshire
Yorkshire	Worcestershire

Icon
Team promoted from Division Two
Team relegated from Division One

=== Division One Standings ===
P	Team	Pld	W	L	Tie	D	Aban	Bat	Bowl	Deduct	Pts	Promoted / Relegated
1	Durham	16	6	3	0	6	1	37	41	0	190	Winners of Championship
2	Nottinghamshire	16	5	3	0	7	1	37	43	0	182	
3	Hampshire	16	5	4	0	7	0	33	47	0	178	
4	Somerset	16	3	2	0	11	0	44	44	0	174	
5	Lancashire	16	5	2	0	8	1	24	40	0	170	
6	Sussex	16	2	2	0	12	0	45	38	0	159	
7	Yorkshire	16	2	5	0	9	0	50	45	0	159	
8	Kent	16	4	6	0	6	0	30	44	0	154	Relegated to Championship Division 2
9	Surrey	16	0	5	0	10	1	45	36	1	124	Relegated to Championship Division 2

Rules for classification: 1^{st} points; 2^{nd} matches won; 3^{rd} fewest defeats
P = Position; Pld = Matches played; W = Matches won; L = Matches lost; Tie = Matches tied; D = Matches drawn; Aban = Matches abandoned; Deduct = Points deducted; Pts = Points

=== Division Two Standings ===
P	Team	Pld	W	L	Tie	D	Aban	Bat	Bowl	Deduct	Pts	Promoted / Relegated
1	Warwickshire	16	5	0	0	11	0	53	46	0	213	Promoted to Championship Division 1
2	Worcestershire	16	6	2	0	7	1	40	45	5	196	Promoted to Championship Division 1
3	Middlesex	16	4	5	0	7	0	46	45	0	175	
4	Northamptonshire	16	3	3	0	10	0	52	35	0	169	
5	Essex	16	5	6	0	5	0	36	45	3	168	
6	Derbyshire	16	4	3	0	9	0	33	46	4	167	
7	Leicestershire	16	3	4	0	9	0	29	43	0	150	
8	Glamorgan	16	3	5	0	7	1	26	36	0	136	
9	Gloucestershire	16	0	5	0	11	0	42	38	2	122	

Rules for classification: 1^{st} points; 2^{nd} matches won; 3^{rd} fewest defeats
P = Position; Pld = Matches played; W = Matches won; L = Matches lost; Tie = Matches tied; D = Matches drawn; Aban = Matches abandoned; Deduct = Points deducted; Pts = Points

== Friends Provident Trophy ==
Source: BBC Sport

Friends Provident Trophy Tables
North Conference

P	Team	Pld	W	L	Tie	NR	Aban	Pts	Net Run Rate
1	Durham	8	5	3	0	0	0	10	0.43
2	Yorkshire	8	4	2	0	2	0	10	0.54
3	Derbyshire	8	3	2	0	3	0	9	-0.14
4	Lancashire	8	3	3	0	2	0	8	0.24
5	Scotland	8	1	6	0	1	0	3	-1.09

Source: CricketArchive
Rules for classification: 1^{st} points; 2^{nd} matches won; 3^{rd} net run rate
P = Position; Pld = Matches played; W = Matches won; L = Matches lost; Tie = Matches tied; NR = No result in matches started; Aban = Matches abandoned; Pts = Points; NRR = Net Run Rate

Midlands Conference

P	Team	Pld	W	L	Tie	NR	Aban	Pts	Net Run Rate
1	Leicestershire	8	5	2	0	1	0	11	0.69
2	Nottinghamshire	8	4	2	0	2	0	10	0.01
3	Northamptonshire	8	4	2	0	2	0	10	0.28
4	Warwickshire	8	2	4	0	2	0	6	-0.14
5	Ireland	8	1	6	0	1	0	3	-0.68

Source: CricketArchive
Rules for classification: 1^{st} points; 2^{nd} matches won; 3^{rd} net run rate
P = Position; Pld = Matches played; W = Matches won; L = Matches lost; Tie = Matches tied; NR = No result in matches started; Aban = Matches abandoned; Pts = Points; NRR = Net Run Rate

South East Conference

P	Team	Pld	W	L	Tie	NR	Aban	Pts	Net Run Rate
1	Kent	8	5	2	0	1	0	11	0.67
2	Essex	8	4	3	0	1	0	9	0.31
3	Middlesex	8	3	3	0	2	0	8	0.06
4	Surrey	8	3	4	0	1	0	7	0.63
5	Sussex	8	1	4	0	3	0	5	0.54

Source: CricketArchive
Rules for classification: 1^{st} points; 2^{nd} matches won; 3^{rd} net run rate
P = Position; Pld = Matches played; W = Matches won; L = Matches lost; Tie = Matches tied; NR = No result in matches started; Aban = Matches abandoned; Pts = Points; NRR = Net Run Rate

South West Conference

P	Team	Pld	W	L	Tie	NR	Aban	Pts	Net Run Rate
1	Gloucestershire	8	4	1	0	3	0	11	0.71
2	Somerset	8	3	2	0	3	0	9	0.31
3	Worcestershire	8	3	3	0	2	0	8	-0.12
4	Hampshire	8	3	4	0	1	0	7	-0.43
5	Glamorgan	8	1	4	0	3	0	5	-0.22

Source: CricketArchive
Rules for classification: 1^{st} points; 2^{nd} matches won; 3^{rd} net run rate
P = Position; Pld = Matches played; W = Matches won; L = Matches lost; Tie = Matches tied; NR = No result in matches started; Aban = Matches abandoned; Pts = Points; NRR = Net Run Rate

Quarter-finals
4 June - Riverside Ground, Chester-le-Street
Nottingham Outlaws	188
Durham Dynamos	189/9
4 June - County Ground, Bristol
Gloucestershire Gladiators	201
Yorkshire Carnegie	205/4
4 June - Grace Road, Leicester
Essex Eagles	350/5
Leicestershire Foxes	232
4 June–5 June - County Ground, Beckenham
Kent Spitfires	259/5
Somerset Sabres	222

Semi-finals
4 July – Riverside, Chester-le-Street
Kent Spitfires	301/4
Durham Dynamos	217
5 July - County Ground, Chelmsford
Essex Eagles	285/8
Yorkshire Carnegie	198

Final
17 August – Lord's Cricket Ground, London
Kent Spitfires	214
Essex Eagles	215/5

== Natwest Pro40 ==
Source: BBC Sport

Natwest Pro40 Tables
Division One

P	Team	Pld	W	L	Tie	NR	Aban	Pts	Net Run Rate
1	Sussex	8	5	1	0	2	0	12	-0.106
2	Hampshire	8	4	2	0	2	0	10	0.633
3	Durham	8	4	3	0	1	0	9	0.369
4	Nottinghamshire	8	4	4	0	0	0	8	0.250
5	Gloucestershire	8	3	3	0	2	0	8	-0.460
6	Somerset	8	3	4	1	0	0	7	-0.154
7	Worcestershire	8	2	3	1	2	0	7	0.110
8	Lancashire	8	1	3	0	4	0	6	-0.815
9	Middlesex	8	2	5	0	1	0	5	-0.138

Source: Cricinfo
Rules for classification: 1^{st} points; 2^{nd} matches won; 3^{rd} net run rate
P = Position; Pld = Matches played; W = Matches won; L = Matches lost; Tie = Matches tied; NR = No result in matches started; Aban = Matches abandoned; Pts = Points; NRR = Net Run Rate

Division Two

P	Team	Pld	W	L	Tie	NR	Aban	Pts	Net Run Rate
1	Essex	8	6	0	1	1	0	14	1.479
2	Yorkshire	8	5	1	1	1	0	12	0.250
3	Glamorgan	8	5	3	0	0	0	10	0.113
4	Kent	8	4	2	0	2	0	10	1.629
5	Surrey	8	4	4	0	0	0	8	-0.444
6	Warwickshire	8	3	3	0	2	0	8	-0.242
7	Leicestershire	8	1	4	1	2	0	5	-0.463
8	Derbyshire	8	1	6	1	0	0	3	-0.892
9	Northamptonshire	8	0	6	0	2	0	2	-0.993

Source: Cricinfo
Rules for classification: 1^{st} points; 2^{nd} matches won; 3^{rd} net run rate
P = Position; Pld = Matches played; W = Matches won; L = Matches lost; Tie = Matches tied; NR = No result in matches started; Aban = Matches abandoned; Pts = Points; NRR = Net Run Rate

Worcestershire beat Glamorgan in the playoff match to retain their Division 1 status for the 2009 season.

== Twenty20 Cup ==
Twenty20 Cup Group Stage
Midlands/Wales/West Division

P	Team	Pld	W	L	Tie	NR	Aban	Pts	Net Run Rate
1	Warwickshire	10	6	1	1	2	0	15	0.694
2	Northamptonshire	10	6	3	0	1	0	13	0.431
3	Glamorgan	10	3	3	0	4	0	10	-0.176
4	Somerset	10	3	4	0	3	0	9	0.313
5	Worcestershire	10	3	6	0	1	0	7	-0.488
6	Gloucestershire	10	1	5	1	3	0	6	-0.931

Source: https://cricketarchive.com/Archive/Events/Tables/Friends_Provident_Trophy_2008.html
Rules for classification: 1^{st} points; 2^{nd} matches won; 3^{rd} net run rate
P = Position; Pld = Matches played; W = Matches won; L = Matches lost; Tie = Matches tied; NR = No result in matches started; Aban = Matches abandoned; Pts = Points; NRR = Net Run Rate

North Division

P	Team	Pld	W	L	Tie	NR	Aban	Pts	Net Run Rate
1	Durham	10	6	1	1	2	0	15	0.984
2	Lancashire	10	6	3	0	1	0	13	0.921
3	Yorkshire	10	5	3	1	1	0	12	-0.312
4	Nottinghamshire	10	4	5	0	1	0	9	0.027
5	Derbyshire	10	3	7	0	0	0	6	-0.421
6	Leicestershire	10	2	7	0	1	0	5	-0.893

Source: https://cricketarchive.com/Archive/Events/Tables/Friends_Provident_Trophy_2008.html
Rules for classification: 1^{st} points; 2^{nd} matches won; 3^{rd} net run rate
P = Position; Pld = Matches played; W = Matches won; L = Matches lost; Tie = Matches tied; NR = No result in matches started; Aban = Matches abandoned; Pts = Points; NRR = Net Run Rate

- Yorkshire were docked two points after fielding an unregistered player (Azeem Rafiq) in their match against Durham.
South Division

P	Team	Pld	W	L	Tie	NR	Aban	Pts	Net Run Rate
1	Middlesex	10	8	2	0	0	0	16	0.732
2	Essex	10	6	3	1	0	0	13	0.937
3	Kent	10	6	4	0	0	0	12	0.640
4	Hampshire	10	5	4	1	0	0	11	-0.505
5	Sussex	10	2	8	0	0	0	4	-0.876
6	Surrey	10	2	8	0	0	0	4	-0.905

Source: https://cricketarchive.com/Archive/Events/Tables/Friends_Provident_Trophy_2008.html
Rules for classification: 1^{st} points; 2^{nd} matches won; 3^{rd} net run rate
P = Position; Pld = Matches played; W = Matches won; L = Matches lost; Tie = Matches tied; NR = No result in matches started; Aban = Matches abandoned; Pts = Points; NRR = Net Run Rate

=== Knockout stage ===
Quarter-finals
22 July - Riverside, Chester-le-Street
Durham Dynamos	163/8
Glamorgan Dragons	119
8 July - The Oval, London
Middlesex Crusaders	176/7
Lancashire Lightning	164/8
7 July - Chelmsford
Essex Eagles	192/9
Northamptonshire Steelbacks	115/7
9 July–10 July - Edgbaston, Birmingham
Warwickshire Bears	133/8
Kent Spitfires	175/6

Semi-finals
26 July – The Rose Bowl, Southampton
Durham Dynamos	138/6
Middlesex Crusaders	141/2
26 July - The Rose Bowl, Southampton
Essex Eagles	159/8
Kent Spitfires	173/7

Final
26 July – The Rose Bowl, Southampton
Middlesex Crusaders	187/6
Kent Spitfires	184/5
