= Stokkers =

Stokkers is a Dutch surname. Notable people with the surname include:

- Finn Stokkers (born 1996), Dutch footballer
- Lesley Stokkers (born 1987), Dutch cricketer
- Patricia Stokkers (born 1976), Dutch swimmer
