= Lesley Stokkers =

Dutch cricketer (born 1987)

Personal information
- Full name: Lesley Willem Stokkers
- Born: 1 November 1987 (age 39); The Hague, The Netherlands
- Batting: Right-handed
- Bowling: Right-arm off-break
- Role: Batsman

International information
- National side: Netherlands
- Only ODI (cap 41): 8 August 2008 v Bermuda

Career statistics
Competition	ODIs	First-class
Matches	1	1
Runs scored	15	29
Batting average	–	14.50
100s/50s	0/0	0/0
Top score	15*	23
Balls bowled	–	–
Wickets	–	–
Bowling average	–	–
5 wickets in innings	–	–
10 wickets in match	–	–
Best bowling	–	–
Catches/stumpings	1/–	0/–
- Source: CricketArchive, 11 October 2008

Lesley Willem Stokkers (born 1 November 1987, The Hague) is a Dutch cricketer. Having worked his way through the national youth teams, he made his debut for the Netherlands cricket team in a One Day International during Bermuda's 2008 tour of the Netherlands on 8 August 2008. He also appeared in an Intercontinental Cup game against Kenya two weeks later. The match against Bermuda has been Stokkers only ODI to-date. He has played two matches for the Netherlands, scoring 15 runs in total.
