= English cricket team in Scotland in 2008 =

	England	Scotland
- Date: 18 August 2008
Captains	Kevin Pietersen	Ryan Watson

One Day International series
- Results: 1-match series drawn 0–0
Most runs	Ian Bell (6)	Gavin Hamilton (60)
Most wickets	Andrew Flintoff (3)	

The England cricket team toured Scotland for one One Day International match on 18 August 2008. However, the match was abandoned due to rain.

== ODI series ==
=== Only ODI ===
18 August
Scorecard

Scotland; 156/9 (44 overs)	v	England; 10/0 (2.3 overs)
Gavin Hamilton 60 (119); Andrew Flintoff 3/21 (8 overs)		Ian Bell 6* (11)

No result
The Grange, Edinburgh, Scotland
Umpires: Paul Baldwin (Ger) and Simon Taufel (Aus)

- Rain shortened match to 44 overs per side. Match then abandoned due to more rain.
- Samit Patel (Eng), Kyle Coetzer and Calum MacLeod (both Sco) made their ODI debuts.
