= South African cricket team in England in 2008 =

	England	South Africa
- Dates: 29 June 2008 – 4 September 2008
Captains	Michael Vaughan (1st-3rd Tests); Kevin Pietersen (4th Test)	Graeme Smith

Test series
- Result: South Africa won the 4-match series 2–1
Most runs	Kevin Pietersen (421)	AB de Villiers (384)
Most wickets	James Anderson (15)	Morné Morkel (15)
- Player of the series: Kevin Pietersen (Eng); Graeme Smith (SA)

One Day International series
- Results: England won the 5-match series 4–0
Most runs	Andrew Flintoff (187)	Herschelle Gibbs (133)
Most wickets	Andrew Flintoff (10)	Jacques Kallis (4)
- Player of the series: Andrew Flintoff (Eng)

Twenty20 International series
- Results: 1-match series drawn 0–0

The South African cricket team toured England between 29 June and 4 September 2008. They played four Test matches, one Twenty20 International and five One Day Internationals against England. They also played six tour matches against Somerset, Middlesex, Bangladesh A, a PCA Masters XI and two against the England Lions.

It was announced that following the conclusion of this four-match series, future matches between England and South Africa would comprise five Test matches but only three one-day matches after the series was granted 'icon' status. The first game with the new format would be in the 2009–10 season in South Africa. In fact though, the next series was four matches, and the 2012 series three.

Following England's losing the test series 2-1, Michael Vaughan resigned as England test captain, having already resigned in 2007 from his role as England ODI captain.

Four years later, when South Africa toured England in 2012, they similarly won the series and brought about the resignation of the England captain, Andrew Strauss.

== Test series ==
=== 1st Test ===
10 July – 14 July
Scorecard

England	v	South Africa
593/8d (156.2 overs); Ian Bell 199 (336); Morné Morkel 4/121 (34 overs)		247 (93.3 overs); Ashwell Prince 101 (183); Monty Panesar 4/74 (26 overs)
		393/3d (167 overs) (f/o); Neil McKenzie 138 (447); James Anderson 2/78 (32 overs)

Match drawn
Lord's, London
Umpires: Billy Bowden (NZ) and Daryl Harper (Aus)
Player of the match: Ian Bell (Eng)

- South Africa won the toss and elected to field.

The series between South Africa and England was a highly anticipated one. England had recently played for the best part of six months against the same opposition (New Zealand) winning the two test series 4–1 on aggregate. They were aware that South Africa would prove to be far superior opposition in the test arena. South Africa arrived in England off the back of a successful winter which had seen them win series in Pakistan and Bangladesh, and draw one in India. They had also beaten New Zealand and West Indies on their home soil comfortably.

England named an unchanged XI for the sixth test in a row, a record. Graeme Smith won the toss and chose to field first hoping his much publicised pace attack would make early inroads into the struggling England batting lineup, which had not passed 400 in their first innings for over a year. However, the South African bowlers were wayward on the first day of the match, and apart from a post-lunch burst where they captured three quick wickets, were unable to exert much authority.

Kevin Pietersen scored a century, a notable moment as it was the first time he had faced his country of birth in a Test match. On day 2, he would go on to score 152, and Ian Bell, who the South Africans has specifically targeted as a player under pressure, scored 199 before being dismissed by the only spinner in the South African squad, Paul Harris.

In amongst this, the openers had scored well for England and Stuart Broad, batting at no 8, scored a free flowing 76 as the South African bowling attack wilted. England eventually declared late on day two on 593/8, straight after Bell was out for 199. The day's play came to an end very early in South Africa's reply due to poor light.

On day 3, England's bowlers carried on from where the batsmen left off. Graeme Smith was caught off a rising Anderson delivery early in the day to get things going, and all the bowlers contributed from there. Neil McKenzie produced a gritty 40 before being bowled round his legs by Monty Panesar. AB de Villiers scored freely before being very well caught by James Anderson off the bowling of Monty Panesar, and Ashwell Prince compiled a determined century to give the South African innings some resemblance of respectability.

However, South Africa were bowled out for just 247, and Michael Vaughan quickly enforced the follow on late on day 3. The openers had to survive a tricky session which saw England open their attack with Monty Panesar and Kevin Pietersen due to the poor light conditions. In fact, Smith was almost dismissed by Pietersen twice during this spell, something he would have been very relieved to avoid, not just due to the match situation, but also as a result of the rivalry between the two players.

Day 4 saw a much more determined approach from the South Africans, aided by a very flat wicket offering little to the bowlers. Smith and McKenzie batted slowly and cautiously, particularly during the morning where the scoring rate was around 1 run per over. Slowly, but surely, they built a partnership and started to chip away at England's lead, whilst frustrating the bowlers in the process. Both men would record a century, and the only wicket to fall in the day was Smith who top edged a pull shot from the new ball off James Anderson's bowling shortly after reaching his 100.

South Africa's resistance continued into the final day, where Hashim Amla also compiled a century to keep England at bay. McKenzie was eventually dismissed after 9.5 hours at the crease, and the only real highlight for England was the cheap dismissal of Jacques Kallis to an excellent yorker from Ryan Sidebottom. The match was declared a draw shortly after tea, with South Africa's second innings score on 393/3. South Africa did declare this innings to call a halt to proceedings, with Michael Vaughan agreeing his side would not go out to chase the 47 run difference.

Essentially it was a match of two halves. England dominance for three days, exploiting helpful conditions and a poor South African bowling effort. South Africa responded excellently on the final two days, to ensure they only lost three wickets during two days of play. It was felt at the time that South Africa would have gained the most out of the drawn fixture.

=== 2nd Test ===
18 July – 22 July
Scorecard

England	v	South Africa
203 (52.3 overs); Kevin Pietersen 45 (46); Morné Morkel 4/52 (15 overs)		522 (176.2 overs); AB de Villiers 174 (381); Monty Panesar 3/65 (29.2 overs)
327 (107 overs); Stuart Broad 67* (60); Morné Morkel 3/61 (22 overs)		9/0 (1.1 overs); Neil McKenzie 6* (4)

South Africa won by 10 wickets
Headingley, Leeds
Umpires: Billy Bowden (NZ) and Daryl Harper (Aus)
Player of the match: Ashwell Prince (SA)

- South Africa won the toss and elected to field.
- Bad light and rain reduced play on day 2 to 76 overs.
- Darren Pattinson (Eng) made his Test debut.

The second test of the series was played at Headingley. England omitted the struggling Paul Collingwood from the side, and replaced him with Andrew Flintoff, returning to play his first test since the final Ashes test at the SCG at the start of 2007. Ryan Sidebottom, suffering from injury, was replaced with debutant Darren Pattinson. This decision provoked considerable reaction as many felt there were other bowlers who were better placed to come into the side – Chris Tremlett, Matthew Hoggard and Stephen Harmison all sprung to mind. Pattinson, born in Grimsby and raised in Australia, had only bowled a handful of overs at first class level, and whilst he had shown promise, his elevation to the test arena was arguably too much too soon for him. A year previously, he was playing grade cricket in Australia alongside his regular job as a roof tiler. He had even shown uncertainly when asked about how keen he was to actually play for England. The decision to field him during a critical Test match prompted a variety of reaction and viewpoints from commentators, players and press experts.

South Africa named an unchanged side, boosted by the confidence of the draw at Lords and content that their bowlers could deliver as anticipated second time around. Graeme Smith enforced this belief by opting to field, and was rewarded as Morné Morkel and Dale Steyn in particular got stuck into England's batsmen. England were dismissed for 203 on day 1. Kevin Pietersen top scored with 45, and Ian Bell scored 31, but this was the best of a bad bunch. Andrew Flintoff scored 17 and looked to have some confidence with the bat, having had very little success in his recent county appearances. But overall, it was a disappointing effort from England, but they did respond with 3 wickets before the close of play to leave South Africa on 101/3.

South Africa used day 2 to ensure England had no chance in the match. Although Hashim Amla was dismissed by Pattinson for his maiden test wicket during the morning session, Ashwell Prince and AB de Villiers formed a strong partnership which would frustrate England for the rest of the day. Their batting was cautious, but not defensive, and they both gradually ground out large scores knowing that they were taking the match out of England's reach. By the end of day 2, South Africa's score was 322/4, a lead of 119.

Ashwell Prince registered his century on day 2, and would go on to score 149. AB de Villiers passed the 3 figure mark on day 3, and went on to make a magnificent 174, and it required a brilliant catch by Andrew Flintoff at slip to eventually dismiss him. England's bowling attack looked innocuous, and lacking any firepower at all. Even Andrew Flintoff struggled to make a significant impact, as South Africa were eventually dismissed for 522 – a massive lead of 319.

England's second innings batting effort was an improvement on the first, but still left people with more questions than answers. Andrew Strauss was out for 0, Michael Vaughan looked brilliant for 21 runs but then edged Makhaya Ntini through to Mark Boucher. Alastair Cook scored a decent score of 60, but not enough to get England out of trouble. Kevin Pietersen came in for the most criticism, scoring 13 runs off 4 balls before edging through to the keeper off the bowling of Jacques Kallis.

In contrast, the non specialist batsmen showed the sort of application that was required in the situation. James Anderson, batting as nightwatchman, kept Alastair Cook company for almost the entire morning session of day 4, compiling his highest score of 34. He faced some extremely hostile bowling during this, and was hit on the helmet by Dale Steyn. Later on, Andrew Flintoff and Tim Ambrose formed a partnership that looked promising, but both fell in the 30s. Stuart Broad, batting at no 8 and with just the tail to support him, made another highly impressive innings of 67 (not out) which included some magnificent cover drives and pull shots. Broad had arguably contributed more with the bat than the ball in the series so far, and even prompted Geoffrey Boycott to compare some of his strokeplay with that of Sir Garfield Sobers.

However, the overall picture was that England succeeded in making South Africa bat again, but with a target of just 9 runs. South Africa therefore won the test by 10 wickets and took a 1–0 lead in the series.

=== 3rd Test ===
30 July – 3 August
Scorecard

England	v	South Africa
231 (77 overs); Alastair Cook 76 (125); Jacques Kallis 3/31 (15 overs)		314 (90.2 overs); Neil McKenzie 72 (127); Andrew Flintoff 4/89 (30 overs)
363 (98.2 overs); Paul Collingwood 135 (195); Morné Morkel 4/97 (19.2 overs)		283/5 (80 overs); Graeme Smith 154* (246); Andrew Flintoff 2/72 (20 overs)

South Africa won by 5 wickets
Edgbaston, Birmingham
Umpires: Aleem Dar (Pak) and Steve Davis (Aus)
Player of the match: Graeme Smith (SA)

- England won the toss and elected to bat.

=== 4th Test ===
7 August – 11 August
Scorecard

South Africa	v	England
194 (64.5 overs); Graeme Smith 46 (103); James Anderson 3/42 (15 overs)		316 (95.2 overs); Kevin Pietersen 100 (137); Makhaya Ntini 5/94 (24 overs)
318 (99.2 overs); AB de Villiers 97 (170); Stuart Broad 3/44 (16.2 overs)		198/4 (52.4 overs); Alastair Cook 67 (106); Makhaya Ntini 2/55 (14 overs)

England won by 6 wickets
The Oval, London
Umpires: Aleem Dar (Pak) and Steve Davis (Aus)
Player of the match: Kevin Pietersen (Eng)

- South Africa won the toss and elected to bat.

== Twenty20 International series ==
=== Only T20I ===
20 August
Scorecard

South Africa	v	England

Match abandoned without a ball bowled
Riverside Ground, Chester-le-Street
Umpires: Peter Hartley and Nigel Llong (both Eng)

- No toss.
- On 19 August, a day before the match was meant to take place, the ground staff announced that the pitch was not playable because of a wet outfield.

== ODI series ==
=== 1st ODI ===
22 August
Scorecard

England; 275/4 (50 overs)	v	South Africa; 255 (49.4 overs)
Kevin Pietersen 90* (82); Jacques Kallis 2/25 (5 overs)		Jacques Kallis 52 (69); Kevin Pietersen 2/22 (5 overs)

England won by 20 runs
Headingley, Leeds
Umpires: Ian Gould (Eng) and Simon Taufel (Aus)
Player of the match: Kevin Pietersen (Eng)

- England won the toss and elected to bat.

=== 2nd ODI ===
26 August
Scorecard

South Africa; 83 (23 overs)	v	England; 85/0 (14.1 overs)
André Nel 13 (7); Stuart Broad 5/23 (10 overs)		Matt Prior 45* (36)

England won by 10 wickets
Trent Bridge, Nottingham
Umpires: Mark Benson (Eng) and Simon Taufel (Aus)
Player of the match: Stuart Broad (Eng)

- South Africa won the toss and elected to bat.

=== 3rd ODI ===
29 August
Scorecard

England; 296/7 (50 overs)	v	South Africa; 170 (42.4 overs)
Andrew Flintoff 78* (77); Johan Botha 2/35 (9 overs)		Hashim Amla 46 (59); Samit Patel 5/41 (9.4 overs)

England won by 126 runs
The Oval, London
Umpires: Nigel Llong (Eng) and Simon Taufel (Aus)
Player of the match: Samit Patel (Eng)

- South Africa won the toss and elected to field.

=== 4th ODI ===
31 August
Scorecard

South Africa; 183/6 (32.1 overs)	v	England; 137/3 (17.4 overs)
Herschelle Gibbs 74 (75); Andrew Flintoff 3/21 (7 overs)		Owais Shah 44* (40); Dale Steyn 1/17 (3 overs)

England won by 7 wickets (D/L)
Lord's, London
Umpires: Mark Benson (Eng) and Simon Taufel (Aus)
Player of the match: Andrew Flintoff (Eng)

- England won the toss and elected to field.
- Rain reduced the South Africa innings to 32.1 overs and the England innings to 20 overs, with a target of 137 runs.

=== 5th ODI ===
3 September
Scorecard

South Africa; 6/1 (3 overs)	v	England
Hashim Amla 3* (6); Stuart Broad 1/0 (1 over)

No result
Sophia Gardens, Cardiff
Umpires: Nigel Llong (Eng) and Simon Taufel (Aus)

- England won the toss and elected to field.
- The match was delayed due to rain and eventually started at 16:30 only for there it be three overs bowled before it started raining again. The rain persisted and the match was officially called off at 19:00.

== Tour matches ==
=== Somerset vs South Africans ===
29 June – 1 July
Scorecard

South Africans	v	Somerset
515/3d (100 overs); Hashim Amla 172 (217); Andy Caddick 2/119 (27 overs)		249 (59.4 overs); Craig Kieswetter 67 (111); Morné Morkel 3/64 (13 overs)
215/6d (58 overs); Neil McKenzie 63 (109); Arul Suppiah 2/54 (15 overs)		115/3 (34 overs); Arul Suppiah 41 (68); André Nel 1/6 (3 overs)

Match drawn
County Ground, Taunton
Umpires: John Holder and Terry Urben (both Eng)

- South Africans won the toss and elected to bat.

=== Middlesex vs South Africans ===
4–6 July
Scorecard

South Africans	v	Middlesex
359/5d (98.3 overs); Hashim Amla 161 (233); Alan Richardson 2/37 (23 overs)		311/5 (79 overs); Eoin Morgan 109 (118); Ashwell Prince 2/11 (4 overs)

Match drawn
Uxbridge Cricket Club Ground, Uxbridge
Umpires: Michael Gough and Steve Garratt (both Eng)

- South Africans won the toss and elected to bat.
- No play was possible on day 3 due to rain.

=== Bangladesh A vs South Africans ===
25–27 July
Scorecard

South Africans	v	Bangladesh A
429/3d (100 overs); Jean-Paul Duminy 166 (234); Dhiman Ghosh 1/10 (2 overs)		121 (41 overs); Mosharraf Hossain 25* (57); Makhaya Ntini 4/32 (9 overs)
328/4d (90.2 overs); Robin Peterson 103* (153); Rubel Hossain 1/30 (11 overs)		97/2 (27 overs); Tamim Iqbal 65 (85); Robin Peterson 2/25 (4 overs)

Match drawn
New Road, Worcester
Umpires: Allan Jones and Terry Urben (both Eng)

- South Africans won the toss and elected to bat.

=== PCA Masters XI vs South Africans ===
13 August
Scorecard

South Africans; 181/4 (20 overs)	v	PCA Masters XI; 158/8 (20 overs)
Justin Ontong 46 (37); Dougie Brown 2/32 (4 overs)		Stephen Moore 52 (33); Albie Morkel 3/29 (4 overs)

South Africa won by 23 runs
Sir Paul Getty's Ground, Wormsley
Umpires: Andy Hicks and Peter Willey (both Eng)

- South Africans won the toss and elected to bat.

=== England Lions vs South Africans ===
14 August
Scorecard

England Lions; 184 (46.5 overs)	v	South Africa; 185/6 (38.4 overs)
Rob Key 51 (62); Dale Steyn 3/27 (8.5 overs)		Herschelle Gibbs 81 (104); Luke Wright 2/22 (4.4 overs)

South Africa won by 4 wickets
Grace Road, Leicester
Umpires: Richard Illingworth and Richard Kettleborough (both Eng)

- South Africans won the toss and elected to field.

=== England Lions vs South Africans ===
16 August
Scorecard

South Africa; 209/5 (50 overs)	v	England Lions; 210/4 (41.2 overs)
Mark Boucher 63* (67); Jonathan Trott 2/17 (6 overs)		Samit Patel 60* (71); André Nel 2/56 (8.2 overs)

England Lions won by 6 wickets
County Ground, Derby
Umpires: Nick Cook and Nigel Cowley (both Eng)

- England Lions won the toss and elected to field.
