= Bermudian cricket team in the Netherlands in 2008 =

	Bermuda	The Netherlands
- Dates: 7 August 2008 – 8 August 2008
Captains	Irving Romaine	Jeroen Smits

One Day International series
- Results: The Netherlands won the 2-match series 1–0
Most runs	Irving Romaine (48); Chris Foggo (38); Jekon Edness (31)	Eric Szwarczynski (55); Ryan ten Doeschate (47); Darron Reekers (30)
Most wickets	Stefan Kelly (3); Rodney Trott (1)	Ryan ten Doeschate (3); Peter Borren (2)

The Bermuda national cricket team toured the Netherlands in 2008. They played two One Day Internationals against the Netherlands.

== ODI series ==
=== 1st ODI ===
7 August
(scorecard)

Bermuda	v	Netherlands

Match abandoned without a ball bowled
VRA Ground, Amstelveen, Netherlands

- Match abandoned due to rain

=== 2nd ODI ===
8 August
(scorecard)

Bermuda; 165/7 (40 overs)	v	Netherlands; 174/4 (36.1 overs)
Irving Romaine 46 (47); Ryan ten Doeschate 3/35 (8 overs)		Eric Szwarczynski 55 (70); Stefan Kelly 3/36 (8 overs)

Netherlands won by 6 wickets
VRA Ground, Amstelveen, Netherlands
Umpires: Niels Bagh (DEN) & Asoka de Silva (SRI)
Player of the match: Ryan ten Doeschate

- Rain shortened match to 40 overs a side
